= Blessed Parliament =

English parliament, 1604–1611

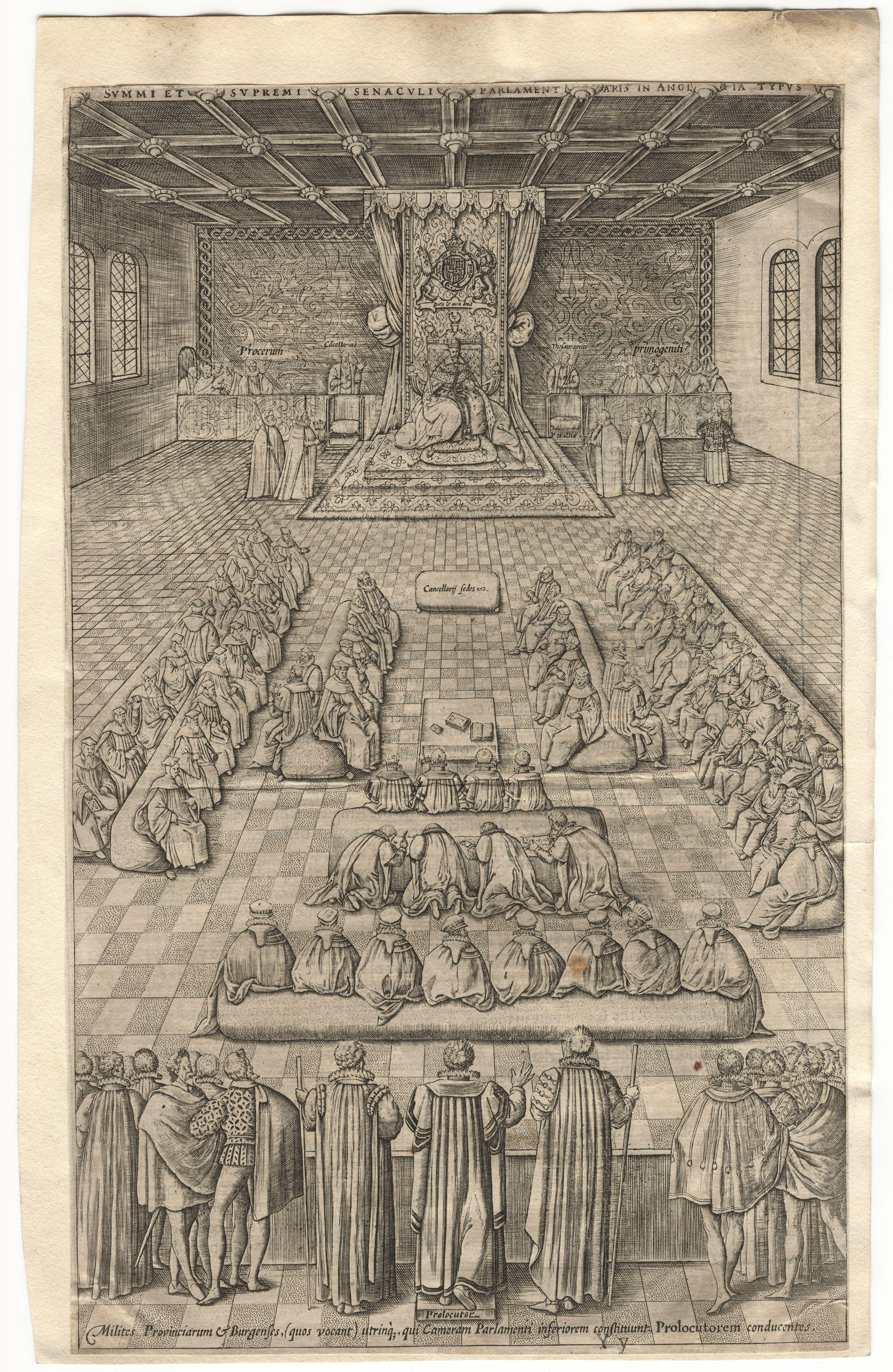
State Opening of Parliament on 5 November 1605, the day of the Gunpowder Plot

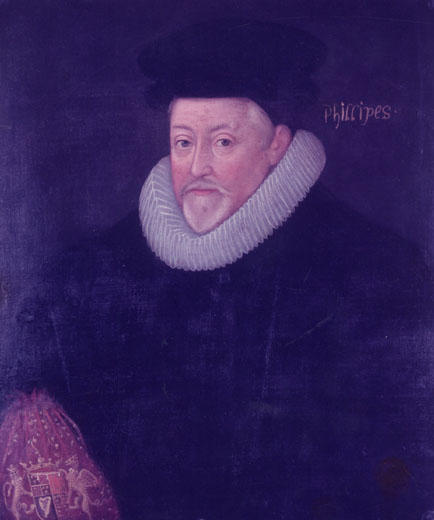
The Speaker, Edward Phelips

The 1st Parliament of King James I was summoned by King James I on 31 January 1604 and assembled on 19 March following. It was known as the Blessed Parliament and took place in five sessions, interrupted by Holy Days and the Gunpowder Plot. The Speaker of the House of Commons was Edward Phelips, the Member of Parliament for Somerset.

King James' objective from the first session of his first Parliament after taking the English throne in addition to that of Scotland was to bring about a statutory union of the two countries. As he said, he did not wish to be "a husband to two wives". However the House of Commons rejected the proposal on the grounds that it would affect English Common Law, and when James sought legal help, he found the judges agreed with Parliament. He was also denied funds as the subsidy was still being collected.

Parliament re-assembled for the second session on 5 November 1605, which was postponed until 6 January 1606 because of the Gunpowder Plot. A bill to outlaw purveyance, whereby the Royal Household could obtain goods by right at reduced prices, was thwarted by the House of Lords. However legislation was successively enacted to prohibit Englishmen from serving in the Spanish armed forces, then at war with the Dutch. The Spanish Company, a trading company which claimed a monopoly on trade with Spain, was also suppressed. In reaction to the Gunpowder Plot, King James was granted subsidies then worth £400,000.

The third session (November 1606 to July 1607) returned to the issue of union between England and Scotland, but only agreed to abolish some medieval laws dealing with Anglo-Scottish hostilities.

The fourth session, delayed by plague and King James' reluctance, met on 9 February 1610. Robert Cecil, 1st Earl of Salisbury, the Lord Treasurer, informed the House that the King needed £600,000 to clear his debts and modernise the Navy. In addition, he proposed a new annual subsidy for the Royal Household of £200,000, in return for which the King would give up his right of purveyance and other historic privileges. After some negotiation a deal was agreed and members left for the summer to consult their constituents on the issue.

The fifth and final session met on 16 October 1610. Support for the "Great Contract" negotiated in the previous session to guarantee the King's finances ran into difficulties over specific taxes the King was imposing on trade and the Commons withdrew from the deal. The King's patience had by now run out. Although initially intended that Parliament should reconvene on 9 February 1611, the King's anger was so great that on 31 December he issued a Proclamation dissolving the assembly, therefore nicknamed "Blessed Parliament".

The Parliament was officially dissolved on 9 February 1611.

== Notable acts passed in the Parliament ==
- Popish Recusants Act 1605
- Presentation of Benefices Act 1605
- Shop-books Evidence Act 1609
- Crown Debts Act 1609
- Assuring and establishing the Isle of Man

== See also ==
- List of MPs elected to the English parliament in 1604
- List of acts of the 1st session of the 1st Parliament of King James I
- List of acts of the 2nd session of the 1st Parliament of King James I
- List of acts of the 3rd session of the 1st Parliament of King James I
- List of acts of the 4th session of the 1st Parliament of King James I
- List of parliaments of England
