= List of acts of the Parliament of England from 1609 =

This is a list of acts of the Parliament of England for the year 1609.

For acts passed during the period 1707–1800, see the list of acts of the Parliament of Great Britain. See also the list of acts of the Parliament of Scotland, and the list of acts of the Parliament of Ireland.

For acts passed from 1801 onwards, see the list of acts of the Parliament of the United Kingdom. For acts of the devolved parliaments and assemblies in the United Kingdom, see the list of acts of the Scottish Parliament, the list of acts of the Northern Ireland Assembly, and the list of acts and measures of Senedd Cymru; see also the list of acts of the Parliament of Northern Ireland.

For medieval statutes, etc. that are not considered to be acts of Parliament, see the list of English statutes.

See also the List of ordinances and acts of the Parliament of England, 1642–1660 for ordinances and acts passed by the Long Parliament and other bodies without royal assent, and which were not considered to be valid legislation following the Restoration in 1660.

The number shown after each act's title is its chapter number. Acts are cited using this number, preceded by the years of the reign during which the relevant parliamentary session was held; thus the Union with Ireland Act 1800 is cited as "39 & 40 Geo. 3. c. 67", meaning the 67th act passed during the session that started in the 39th year of the reign of George III and which finished in the 40th year of that reign. The modern convention is to use Arabic numerals in citations (thus "41 Geo. 3" rather than "41 Geo. III"). Acts of the last session of the Parliament of Great Britain and the first session of the Parliament of the United Kingdom are both cited as "41 Geo. 3".

Acts passed by the Parliament of England did not have a short title; however, some of these acts have subsequently been given a short title by acts of the Parliament of the United Kingdom, such as the Short Titles Act 1896 (59 & 60 Vict. c. 14).

Acts passed by the Parliament of England were deemed to have come into effect on the first day of the session in which they were passed. Because of this, the years given in the list below may in fact be the year before a particular act was passed.

== 7 Jas. 1 ==
The fourth session of the 1st Parliament of King James I (the 'Blessed Parliament'), which met from 9 February 1610 until 23 July 1610.

This session was traditionally cited as 7 Jac. 1, 7 Ja. 1, 7 J. 1 or 7 & 8 Jac. 1.

=== Public acts ===
Short title	Citation	Royal assent
Long title
Criminal Law Act 1609 (repealed)	7 Jas. 1. c. 1	23 July 1610
An act for the better execution of justice, and suppressing of criminal offenders, in the north parts of the kingdom of England. (Repealed by Statute Law Revision Act 1863 (26 & 27 Vict. c. 125))
Naturalisation and Restoration of Blood Act 1609 (repealed)	7 Jas. 1. c. 2	23 July 1610
An Act that all such as are to be naturalized, or restored in blood, shall first receive the sacrament of the Lord's Supper, and the oath of allegiance and the oath of supremacy. (Repealed by Naturalization Act 1870 (33 & 34 Vict. c. 14))
Apprentice Act 1609 (repealed)	7 Jas. 1. c. 3	23 July 1610
An Act for the continuing and better maintenance of husbandry and other manual occupations, by the true implement of monies given and to be given for the binding out of apprentices. (Repealed by Statute Law Revision Act 1863 (26 & 27 Vict. c. 125))
Vagabonds Act 1609 (repealed)	7 Jas. 1. c. 4	23 July 1610
An Act for the due execution of divers laws and statutes heretofore made against rogues, vagabonds and sturdy beggars, and other lewd and idle persons. (Repealed by Statute Law Revision Act 1863 (26 & 27 Vict. c. 125))
Public Officers Protection Act 1609 (repealed)	7 Jas. 1. c. 5	23 July 1610
An Act for ease in pleading troublesome and contentious suits prosecuted against justices of the peace, mayors, constables, and certain other his Majesty's officers, for the lawful execution of their office. (Repealed by Public Authorities Protection Act 1893 (56 & 57 Vict. c. 61))
Oath of Allegiance, etc. Act 1609 (repealed)	7 Jas. 1. c. 6	23 July 1610
An Act for administring the oath of allegiance, and reformation of married women recusants. (Repealed by Religious Disabilities Act 1846 (9 & 10 Vict. c. 59))
Wool Sorters, etc. Act 1609 (repealed)	7 Jas. 1. c. 7	23 July 1610
An Act for the punishing and correcting of deceit and frauds committed by sorts, kembers and spinsters of wool, and weavers of woolen yarn. (Repealed by Statute Law Revision Act 1863 (26 & 27 Vict. c. 125))
Cattle Act 1609 (repealed)	7 Jas. 1. c. 8	23 July 1610
An Act to inlarge an act of parliament made in the second and third year of King Philip and Queen Mary, intituled, "An Act for the keeping of milch-kine, or breeding and rearing of calves." (Note: Increase of Cattle Act 1555 (2 & 3 Ph. & M. c. 3)) (Repealed by Statute Law Revision Act 1863 (26 & 27 Vict. c. 125))
London Water (Hackney) Act 1609 (repealed)	7 Jas. 1. c. 9	23 July 1610
An Act for the bringing of fresh streams of water by engine from Hackney-Marsh to the city of London, for the benefit of the King's college at Chelsey. (Note: Chelsea College (17th century)) (Repealed by Statute Law Revision Act 1948 (11 & 12 Geo. 6. c. 62))
Alehouse Act 1609 (repealed)	7 Jas. 1. c. 10	23 July 1610
An Act for the reformation of alehouse-keepers. (Repealed by Alehouse Act 1828 (9 Geo. 4. c. 61))
Game Act 1609 (repealed)	7 Jas. 1. c. 11	23 July 1610
An act to prevent the spoil of corn and grain, by untimely hawking, and for the better preservation of pheasants and partridges. (Repealed by Game Act 1831 (1 & 2 Will. 4. c. 32))
Shop-books Evidence Act 1609 (repealed)	7 Jas. 1. c. 12	23 July 1610
An Acte to avoide the double Payment of Debtes. (Repealed by Statute Law Revision Act 1863 (26 & 27 Vict. c. 125), Statute Law Revision Act 1948 (11 & 12 Geo. 6. c. 62) and Statute Law (Repeals) Act 1969 (c. 52))
Deer Stealing Act 1609 (repealed)	7 Jas. 1. c. 13	23 July 1610
An Act for the explanation of a statute made in the second session of this present parliament, intituled, "An Act against unlawful hunting and stealing of deer and conies." (Note: Stealing of Deer, etc. Act 1605 (3 Jas. 1. c. 13)) (Repealed for England and Wales by Criminal Statutes Repeal Act 1827 (7 & 8 Geo. 4. c. 27) and for India by Criminal Law (India) Act 1828 (9 Geo. 4. c. 74))
Horns Act 1609 (repealed)	7 Jas. 1. c. 14	23 July 1610
An Act for the reviving of Part of a former Act made in the fourth Year of King Edward the Fourth, (Note: Horn Act 1464 (4 Edw. 4. c. 8)) that no Stranger or Alien shall buy English Horns unwrought; and that the Wardens of the Horners of the City of London for the Time being, should have Power to search all manner of Wares appertaining to their Mystery in London and four and twenty Miles on every Side of it. (Repealed by Customs Law Repeal Act 1825 (6 Geo. 4. c. 105))
Crown Debts Act 1609 (repealed)	7 Jas. 1. c. 15	23 July 1610
An Acte concerninge some maner of Assignementes of Debtes to His Majesty. (Repealed by Statute Law Revision Act 1948 (11 & 12 Geo. 6. c. 62) and Statute Law (Repeals) Act 1969 (c. 52)
Cloths Act 1609 (repealed)	7 Jas. 1. c. 16	23 July 1610
An Act for the encouragement of many poor people in Cumberland and Westmorland, and in the towns and parishes of Carptmell, Oxhead and Broughton in the county of Lancaster, to continue a trade of making cogware, kendals, carptmeals and coarse cottons. (Repealed by Statute Law Revision Act 1863 (26 & 27 Vict. c. 125))
Burning of Moor Act 1609 (repealed)	7 Jas. 1. c. 17	23 July 1610
An Act against burning of Ling and Heath & other Moorburning in the Counties of York Durham Northumberland Cumberland Westerland Lancaster Darby Nottingham and Leicester at unseasonable tymes of yeare. (Repealed by Statute Law Revision Act 1863 (26 & 27 Vict. c. 125))
Sea Sand (Devon and Cornwall) Act 1609	7 Jas. 1. c. 18	23 July 1610
An Acte for the takinge landinge and carryinge of Sea Sand for the betteringe of Grounds, and for the Increase of Corne and Tillage within the Counties of Devon and Cornwall.
River Exe (Weir) Act 1609	7 Jas. 1. c. 19 (Note: Also listed as 7 Jas. 1. c. 27 Pr.)	23 July 1610
An act for the continuance and reparation of a new built weare upon the river of Exe, near unto the city of Exeter.
Inundations, Norfolk and Suffolk Act 1609 or the Sea Breach Act 1609 (repealed)	7 Jas. 1. c. 20	23 July 1610
An Act for the speedy recovery of many thousand acres of marsh ground, and other ground within the counties of Norfolk and Suffolk, lately surrounded by the range of the sea in divers parts of the said counties, and for the prevention of the danger of the like surrounding hereafter. (Repealed by Statute Law Revision Act 1948 (11 & 12 Geo. 6. c. 62))
Confirmation of decrees as to copyholds, etc. Act 1609 (repealed)	7 Jas. 1. c. 21	23 July 1610
An act for confirmation of decrees hereafter to be made in the exchequer-chamber, and duchy-court, concerning copyhold lands and tenements. (Repealed by Statute Law Revision Act 1948 (11 & 12 Geo. 6. c. 62))
Taxation Act 1609 (repealed)	7 Jas. 1. c. 22	23 July 1610
An Acte for Confirmacion of the Subsidie granted by the Clergie. (Repealed by Statute Law Revision Act 1863 (26 & 27 Vict. c. 125))
Taxation (No. 2) Act 1609 (repealed)	7 Jas. 1. c. 23	23 July 1610
An Acte for the Grant of one entire Subsidie and one Fiftenth and Tenth by the Temporalitie. (Repealed by Statute Law Revision Act 1863 (26 & 27 Vict. c. 125))
Act of General Pardon 1609 (repealed)	7 Jas. 1. c. 24	23 July 1610
An Acte for the Kinges Most gracious generall and free Pardon. (Repealed by Statute Law Revision Act 1863 (26 & 27 Vict. c. 125))

=== Private acts ===
Short title	Citation	Royal assent
Long title
Manor of Wakefield (Yorkshire): confirmation of decrees between King and copyholders.	7 Jas. 1. c. 1 Pr.	23 July 1610
An Act for confirmation of several decrees made in the court of exchequer chamber, and dutchy chamber, between the King's majesty and divers copyholders of his Majesty's manor of Wakefield in the county of York.
Manor of Edmonton (Middlesex): confirmation of a decree between King and copyholders.	7 Jas. 1. c. 2 Pr.	23 July 1610
An Act for confirmation of a decree made in the court of exchequer chamber, between the King's majesty and the copyholders of his Majesty's manor of Edelmeton, alias Edmonton, in the county of Middlesex.
Manors or Lordships of Clitheroe, Derby, Accrington, Colne and Ightenhill (Lancashire): creation and confirmation of copyholds.	7 Jas. 1. c. 3 Pr.	23 July 1610
An act for the perfect creation and confirmation of certain copyhold lands in the honour, castle, manor or lordship of Clitherowe, or in the several manors of lordships of Derby, Accarington, Colne and Ightenhill, in the county of Lancaster.
Assurance of the Isle of Man Act 1609 (repealed)	7 Jas. 1. c. 4 Pr.	23 July 1610
An Acte for the Assuringe and Establishing of the Isle of Manne in the name and blood of William, Earl of Derby. (Note: William Stanley, 6th Earl of Derby.) (Repealed by Statute Law Revision (Isle of Man) Act 1991 (c. 61))
Earl of Derby's Estate Act 1609	7 Jas. 1. c. 5 Pr.	23 July 1610
An Act for the explanation of a proviso or branch of a statute contained in an act of parliament made in the years of the reign of our sovereign lord King James, of England, France and Ireland the Fourth, and of Scotland the Fortieth, intituled, "An Act for the establishment and assurance of divers of the possessions and hereditaments of Ferdinando late earl of Derby." (Note: Earl of Derby's Estate Act 1606 (4 Jas. 1. c. 3 Pr.))
Assurance of lands to Bishop of Durham and Earl of Salisbury.	7 Jas. 1. c. 6 Pr.	23 July 1610
An act for the assurance of certain lands and rent to the bishop of Duresme and his successors, and of certain other lands to Robert earl of Salisbury (Note: Robert Cecil, 1st Earl of Salisbury.) and his heirs.
Naturalization of Sir Robert Karr Act 1609	7 Jas. 1. c. 7 Pr.	23 July 1610
An Act for the naturalizing of sir Robert Karre, knight.
Naturalization of Jane Drummond Act 1609	7 Jas. 1. c. 8 Pr.	23 July 1610
An Act for the naturalizing of mistress Jane Drummond, gentlewoman of the Queen's majesty's bedchamber.
Earl of Oxenford's Estate Act 1609	7 Jas. 1. c. 9 Pr.	23 July 1610
An act for the sale of the manor of Bretts and farm of Plastowe in the county of Essex, parcel of the possessions of Henry earl of Oxenford, towards the repurchasing of the castle, manor and parks of Henningham in the same county, being the ancient inheritance and chief mansion house of the earls of Oxenford.
Assurance of farm and demesnes of Damerham (Wiltshire) according to the grants of the King and King Edward VI.	7 Jas. 1. c. 10 Pr.	23 July 1610
An Act for the assuring of the farm and demesnes of Damerham and other lands in Wiltshire, according to his Majesty's grant, and a former grant made by King Edward the Sixth.
Foundation of hospital and grammar school, and maintenance of a teacher, in Thetford.	7 Jas. 1. c. 11 Pr.	23 July 1610
An Act for the foundation of an hospital, a grammar school, and maintenance of a preacher, in the town of Thetford, for ever according to the last will and testament of Richard Fullmarston, knight.
Naturalization of John Murray, Richard Murray, John Levingston and John Auchmothy.	7 Jas. 1. c. 12 Pr.	23 July 1610
An Act for the naturalizing of John Marray, John Levinston, and John Auchmothy, grooms of his Majesty's bedchamber, and Richard Murray, warden of Manchester.
Naturalization of Levinus Munk Act 1609	7 Jas. 1. c. 13 Pr.	23 July 1610
An Act for the naturalizing of Levinus Munke, one of the clerks of his Majesty's signet.
Elrington Orphans' Provision Act 1609	7 Jas. 1. c. 14 Pr.	23 July 1610
An act for the confirming and establishing of a decree made in the high court of chancery, for and on the behalf of nine poor children and orphans of William Elrington and Edward Elrington, against Edward Cage, executor of the last will and testament of Rowland Elrington, brother of the said Edward and William Elrington, and uncle of the said children, and for the extending of the lands and goods of the said Edward Cage, for the speedy execution and performance of the said decree, and the payment and satisfaction of the sums of money thereby decreed to the said children.
Naturalization of Robert Browne Act 1609	7 Jas. 1. c. 15 Pr.	23 July 1610
An Act for the naturalizing of Robert Browne, his Majesty's servant in ordinary.
Arundell's Estate Act 1609	7 Jas. 1. c. 16 Pr.	23 July 1610
An Act for Confirmation of certain Fines levied by John Arundell of Guarnack, Esquire, to John Aundell of Trerise, Esquire, deceased, and for settling of the Manors, Lands Tenements and Hereditaments comprised in the said Fines, upon John Arundell, Esquire, and his Heirs, Son of the said John Arundell deceased.
Estates of Lord Abergavenny and Sir Henry Nevill: alienation of lands for payment of debts and advancement of children, and assurance of other lands lately purchased from the King.	7 Jas. 1. c. 17 Pr.	23 July 1610
An Act to enable Edward Nevill, Lord Bergavenny, and Sir Henry Nevill, Knight, his eldest Son, to alien certain Lands, for Payment of their Debts, and Advancement of their Daughters and younger Sons, and for better Assurance of other Lands lately purchased by the said Lord from his Majesty.
Restitution in blood of George Brooke's children.	7 Jas. 1. c. 18 Pr.	23 July 1610
An Act for the Restitution in Blood of the Son and two Daughters of George Brooke, late attainted of High Treason.
Disuniting the parsonages of Ashe and Deane (Hampshire).	7 Jas. 1. c. 19 Pr.	23 July 1610
An Act for the disuniting of the Parsonages of Asbe and Deane, within the County of Southampton, being presentative and with the Cure of Souls.
Naturalization of Henry Gibb Act 1609	7 Jas. 1. c. 20 Pr.	23 July 1610
An Act for the naturalizing of Henry Gibb, groom of the bedchamber to the most excellent prince Henry prince of Wales.
William Essex's Estate Act 1609	7 Jas. 1. c. 21 Pr.	23 July 1610
An act for sale of part of the lands of William Essex of Lamborne in the county of Berks, esquire, for the payment of his debts, and settling the residue upon himself and his posterity.
Relief of John Holdich, disinherited by the extraordinary amending of the errors of a fine.	7 Jas. 1. c. 22 Pr.	23 July 1610
An act for the relief of John Holdich, gentleman, disinherited by the extraordinary amending of the errors of a fine.
Naturalization of Sir George Ramsay, Walter Alexander and John Sandilandis.	7 Jas. 1. c. 23 Pr.	23 July 1610
An Act for the naturalizing of sir George Ramsey, knight, equerry of the most excellent prince Henry, Walter Alexander, gentleman usher of the said prince Henry, and John Sandilandis, groom of the said prince his bedchamber.
Naturalization of Peter Vanlore Act 1609	7 Jas. 1. c. 24 Pr.	23 July 1610
An Act for the naturalizing of Peter Vanloore (Note: Sir Peter Vanlore (c. 1547-1627), merchant.) of Fanchurch-street, (Note: Fenchurch Street.) London, merchant.
Salters and Brewers Estates Act 1609	7 Jas. 1. c. 25 Pr.	23 July 1610
An act for the securing and confirming of certain lands and tenements, heretofore granted, devised or conveyed to the companies of salters and brewers of London.
Uniting parishes of Froome Whitfield (Dorset) and Holy Trinity, Dorchester.	7 Jas. 1. c. 26 Pr.	23 July 1610
An Act for the uniting and annexing of the parsonage and decayed parish of Froom Whitfield, in the county of Dorset, to the parsonage and parish of the Holy Trinity in the Dorchester, in the said county.
River Exe (Weir) Act 1609	7 Jas. 1. c. 27 Pr. (Note: Also listed as 7 Jas. 1. c. 19.)	23 July 1610
An act for the continuance and reparation of a new built weare upon the river of Exe, near unto the city of Exeter.
Establishment of Thomas Sutton's Charities Act 1609	7 Jas. 1. c. 28 Pr. (Note: This is the citation in The Statutes of the Realm.); 7 Jas. 1. c. 27 Pr. (Note: This is the citation in The Statutes at Large.)	23 July 1610
An Act to confirm and enable the erection and establishment of an hospital, a free grammar school, and sundry other godly and charitable acts and uses, done and intended to be done and performed by Thomas Sutton, esquire.
Establishing the inheritance of Sir Henry Crisp and rendering certain conveyances void.	7 Jas. 1. c. 29 Pr. 7 Jas. 1. c. 28 Pr.	23 July 1610
An Act for making void of certain Conveyances, and the Estates limited thereby, unduly gotten from Sir Henry Crispe, Knight, whereby he is defrauded of the Inheritance of divers Manors, Lands, Tenements and Hereditaments lying in the County of Kent, and for the Establishing of the Inheritance of the same in the said Sir Henry Crispe and his Heirs.
Sir John Wentworth's Estate Act 1609	7 Jas. 1. c. 30 Pr. 7 Jas. 1. c. 29 Pr.	23 July 1610
An Act for the enabling of the Assurance of certain Lands conveyed for the Portions of three of the Daughters of John Wentworth, Esquire, and for the Confirmation of certain other Estates for Life in other Lands, and to enable Sir John Wentworth, Knight, to sell certain Lands for the Payment of his Debts.
Reginald Rous's Estate Act 1609	7 Jas. 1. c. 31 Pr. 7 Jas. 1. c. 30 Pr.	23 July 1610
An Act for the enabling of Reginald Rous of Badingham in the County of Suffolk, Gentleman, to make Sale of the third Part of the Manor of Badingham Hall with the Appurtenances, and of the third Part of certain other Lands and Tenements with the Appurtenances in Badingham, Tymingtom and Little Glenham, in the said County of Suffolk, to Reginald Rous of the Inner Temple, London, Esquire, Nephew to the said Reginald Rous of Badingham.
Naturalization of Edward and Henry Palmers and Michael Boyle.	7 Jas. 1. c. 32 Pr. 7 Jas. 1. c. 31 Pr.	23 July 1610
An Act for the Naturalizing of Edward Palmer and Henry Palmer, Sons of William Palmer of Ulishing; and Michael Boyle, Son of James Boyle, Citizen and Mercer of London.
Charles Waldegrave's Estate Act 1609	7 Jas. 1. c. 33 Pr. 7 Jas. 1. c. 32 Pr.	23 July 1610
An act for the enabling of Charles Waldegrave, esquire, to make sale of certain lands for the payment of his debts, and the advancement of his younger sons and daughters.
Naturalization of Richard, John and Robert Bladwell, George and John Hasden, Elizabeth and Ann Cradock, Jane or Janekin Carstens and Elizabeth Van Buechton.	7 Jas. 1. c. 34 Pr. 7 Jas. 1. c. 33 Pr.	23 July 1610
An Act for the Naturalizing of Richard Bladwell, John Bladwell and Robert Bladwell, Sons of John Bladwell, an Englishman; George Hasden and John Hasden, Sons of John Hasden; Marten Hasden, Wife of the latter mentioned John Hasden; Elizabeth Cradock and Ann Cradock, Daughters of William Cradock, an Englishman; Jane alias Janeken Carstens; and Elizabeth Van Buechton.
Confirmation of sales of property, late the estate of Henry Jarnegan, made by Sir Thomas Hirne, Christopher Hirne and Clement Hirne to Sir John and Dame Bridget Heveningham.	7 Jas. 1. c. 35 Pr. 7 Jas. 1. c. 34 Pr.	23 July 1610
An Act for the Confirmation of the Sale and Conveyance of divers Manors, Lordships, Liberties, and other Hereditaments, late Henry Jarnegan's, Esquire, made by Sir Thomas Hirne, Knight, Christopher Hirne, Gentleman, and Clement Hirne, Esquire, unto Sir John Heveningham, Knight, and Dame Bridget his Wife.
Naturalization of John Mounsy Act 1609	7 Jas. 1. c. 36 Pr. 7 Jas. 1. c. 35 Pr.	23 July 1610
An Act for the naturalizing of John Mounsy.
Naturalization of Joane Greensmith Act 1609	7 Jas. 1. c. 37 Pr. 7 Jas. 1. c. 36 Pr.	23 July 1610
An Act for the naturalizing of Johaannakyn alias Joane Greensmith, daughter of Matthew Greensmith, citizen and grocer of London.
Sir Robert Drury's Conveyances Revocation Act 1609	7 Jas. 1. c. 38 Pr. 7 Jas. 1. c. 37 Pr.	23 July 1610
An act for confirmation of three several writings indented, purporting and setting forth the revocations of three several conveyances or assurances made by sir Robert Drury, knight, unto divers persons, upon natural considerations only.
Naturalization of Margaret Clark Act 1609	7 Jas. 1. c. 39 Pr. 7 Jas. 1. c. 38 Pr.	23 July 1610
An Act for the naturalizing of Margaret Clarke, wife of Robert Clarke, gentleman.
Sir John Biron's Estate Act 1609	7 Jas. 1. c. 40 Pr. 7 Jas. 1. c. 39 Pr.	23 July 1610
An Act for amending of a writ of entry whereupon a common recovery was had of the inheritance of sir John Byron, knight, within the county palatine of Lancaster.
Naturalization of George Montgomery, Bishop of Derry, Sir Hugh Montgomery, Hugh and James Montgomery and Sir James Fullarton.	7 Jas. 1. c. 41 Pr. 7 Jas. 1. c. 40 Pr.	23 July 1610
An Act for the naturalizing the right reverend father in God George Montgomery, (Note: George Montgomery, Bishop of Derry.) lord bishop of Derry in Ireland, sir James Fullerton, and sir High Montgomery, children of the said sir Hugo Montgomery.
Naturalization of Martinus Schonerus, Dorothee and Engella Seelken, Katherine Benneken, John Wolfgang Rumbler and Anna de Lobell alias Wolfgang Rumbler.	7 Jas. 1. c. 42 Pr. 7 Jas. 1. c. 41 Pr.	23 July 1610
An Act for the Naturalizing of Martinus Schonerus, Ordinary Physician to the Queen; Dorthee Seelken and Engella Seelken, two Maids of the Queen's Bedchamber; Katherine Benneken, Servant to the Queen; John Wolfang Rumbler, Apothecary in Ordinary to the King and Queen; Anna Wolsang Rumbler alias Anna De Lobell, Wife of the said John Wolfang Rumber; and their legitimate Children.
Christopher and Millicent Smith: confirmation of deed of revocation.	7 Jas. 1. c. 43 Pr. 7 Jas. 1. c. 42 Pr.	23 July 1610
An Act to make one Writing indented, bearing Date the ninth Day of March in the first Year of His Majesty's Reign of England, made by Christopher Smith, Esquire, and Millicent Smith his Son and Heir apparent, purporting a Revocation of the Uses and Estates of the Manor of Water Newton in the County of Huntingdon, and of divers Lands, Tenements and Hereditaments in the said Writing of Revocation mentioned, to have the full Force and Power of a perfect Deed of Revocation, according to the Purport of the said Writing, and according to the true Intent and Meaning of the Parties thereunto, whereby the said Millicent Smith may be enabled to make Sale for the Payment of his Debts.

=== Sources ===
- Raithby, John, ed. (1963) [1819]. "7° Jac.". Statutes of the Realm. Vol. 4 Part 2: The Statutes of Queen Elizabeth (An. 28-43) and of King James (1586–1623). London: Dawsons. pp. 1153–1206 – via HathiTrust.
- Raithby, John, ed. (1963) [1819]. "7° Jac.". Statutes of the Realm. Vol. 4 Part 2: The Statutes of Queen Elizabeth (An. 28-43) and of King James (1586–1623). London: Dawsons. p. 1153-1206 – via Google Books.
- Raithby, John, ed. (1963) [1819]. "7° Jac.". Statutes of the Realm. Vol. 4 Part 2: The Statutes of Queen Elizabeth (An. 28-43) and of King James (1586–1623). London: Dawsons. p. 1153-1206 – via Internet Archive.
- Pickering, Danby, ed. (1763). "Anno quarto Jacobi". The Statutes at Large. Vol. 7: From the Thirty-ninth Year of Q. Elizabeth to the Twelfth Year of K. Charles. Inclusive. Cambridge: Joseph Bentham. pp. 216–249 – via Internet Archive.
- Journal of the House of Commons. Vol. 1 – 1547-1629. His Majesty's Stationery Office. 1802 – via British History Online.
- Journal of the House of Lords. Vol. 2: 1578-1614. London: His Majesty's Stationery Office. 1830 – via British History Online.
- Chronological Table of and Index to the Statutes. Vol. 1: To the End of the Session 59 Vict. Sess. 2 (1895) (13th ed.). London: Her Majesty's Stationery Office. 1896. p. 66 – via Google Books.
- Chronological Table of the Statutes: Covering the Period from 1235 to the End of 1971. London: Her Majesty's Stationery Office. 1972. pp. 63–64. ISBN 978-0-11-840096-1 – via Google Books.
- "Acts of the English Parliament from 1609". legislation.gov.uk. The National Archives.
- "Chronological Tables of the Private and Personal Acts: Part 2 (1603–1640)". legislation.gov.uk. The National Archives.

== See also ==
- List of acts of the Parliament of England
