= Religious Disabilities Act 1846 =

Act of the Parliament of the United Kingdom

Religious Disabilities Act 1846 (Note: The citation of this act by this short title was authorised by section 1 of, and the first schedule to, the Short Titles Act 1896. Due to the repeal of those provisions it is now authorised by section 19(2) of the Interpretation Act 1978.)
- Act of Parliament
- Parliament of the United Kingdom
- Long title: An Act to relieve Her Majesty's Subjects from certain Penalties and Disabilities in regard to Religious Opinions.
- Citation: 9 & 10 Vict. c. 59
- Territorial extent: United Kingdom

Dates
- Royal assent: 18 August 1846
- Commencement: 18 August 1846 (Note: The Acts of Parliament (Commencement) Act 1793.)
- Repealed: 16 November 1989
Other legislation
Amends	See § Repealed enactments
Repeals/revokes	See § Repealed enactments
Amended by	Liberty of Religious Worship Act 1855; Statute Law (Repeals) Act 1969; Statute Law (Repeals) Act 1977
Repealed by	Statute Law (Repeals) Act 1989
Relates to	Roman Catholic Relief Act 1829; Roman Catholics Act 1844; Places of Worship Registration Act 1855

Status: Repealed

Text of statute as originally enacted

The Religious Disabilities Act 1846 (9 & 10 Vict. c. 59) was an act of the Parliament of the United Kingdom which repealed several laws restricting religious freedom.

== Provisions ==
The laws and observances abolished were specified by various acts of the Parliament of England, Parliament of Great Britain, or Parliament of Ireland. These acts were repealed in full where they had no other purpose than establishing the relevant observance, and otherwise repealed only in relation to the observance.

=== Repealed enactments ===
Section 1 of the act repealed 25 enactments, listed in that section.

Citation	Short title	Long title	Extent of repeal
N/A	N/A	The Statute or Ordinance of the Fifty-fourth and Fifty-fifth Years of the Reign of King Henry the Third, and the Statute or Ordinance commonly called Statutum Judæismo.	The whole act.
5 & 6 Edw. 6. c. 1	Act of Uniformity 1551	an Act passed in the Fifth and Sixth Years of the Reign of King Edward the Sixth, intituled An Act for the Uniformity of Service and Administration of Sacraments throughout the Realm.	As enacts "that from and after Feast of All Saints next coming all and every Person and Persons inhabiting within this Realm, or any other of the King's Majesty's Dominions, shall diligently and faithfully, having no lawful or reasonable Excuse to be absent, endeavour themselves to resort to their Parish Church or Chapel accustomed, or, upon reasonable Let thereof, to some usual Place where Common Prayer and such Service of God shall be used in such Time of Let, upon every Sunday, and other Days ordained and used to be kept as holy Days, and then and there to abide orderly and soberly during the Time of Common Prayer, Preachings, or other Service of God there to be used and ministered, upon Pain of Punishment by the Censures of the Church", so far as the same affected persons dissenting from the worship or doctrines of the United Church of England and Ireland, and usually attending place of worship other than the Established Church. (This repeal was subject to a proviso that no pecuniary penalty was to be imposed upon any person by reason of his so absenting himself as aforesaid.); As enactes "that if any Manner of Person or Persons inhabiting and being within this Realme, or any other the King's Majesty's Dominions, shall, after the said Feast of All Saints, willingly and wittingly hear and be present at any other Manner or Form of Common Prayer, of Administration of the Sacraments, of making of Ministers in the Churches, or of any other Rites contained in the Book annexed to this Act than is mentioned and set forth in the said Book, or that is contrary to the Form of sundry Provisions and Exceptions contained in the aforesaid former Statute, and shall be thereof convicted according to the Laws of this Realm, before the Justices of Assize, the Justices of Oyer and Determiner, Justices of Peace in their Sessions, or any of them, by the Verdict of Twelve Men, or by his or their own Confession, or otherwise, shall, for the First Offence suffer Imprisonment for Six Months, without Bail or Mainprize, and for the Second offence, being likewise convicted as is above-said, Imprisonment for One whole Year, and for the Third Offence, in the like Manner, Imprisonment during his or their Lives".; As enactes "that for the more Knowledge to be given hereof, and better Observation of this Law, all and singular Curates shall, upon one Sunday every Quarter of the Year, during One whole Year next following the foresaid Feast of All Saints next coming, read this present Act in the Church at the Time of the most Assembly, and likewise once in every Year following, at the same Time declaring unto the People, by the Authority of the Scripture, how the Mercy and Goodness of God hath in all Ages been shown to his People in their Necessities and Extremities, by means of hearty and faithful Prayers made to Almighty God, especially where People be gathered together with One Faith and Mind to offer up their Hearts by Prayer as the best Sacrifices that Christian Men can yield".; "So much of any Act or Acts of the Parliament of Ireland as may have extended to Ireland the provisions of the act, so far as the same was thereby repealed."I.e., sections 1, 2, 3, 4 and 6.
1 Eliz. 1. c. 1	Act of Supremacy 1558	An Act passed in the First Year of the Reign of Queen Elizabeth, intituled An Act to restore to the Crown the ancient Jurisdiction over the Estate Ecclesiastical and Spiritual, and abolishing all Foreign Powers repugnant to the same.	As makes it punishable to affirm, hold, stand with, set forth, maintain, or defend, as therein is mentioned, the Authority, Pre-eminence, Power, or Jurisdiction, Spiritual or Ecclesiastical, of any Foreign Prince, Prelate, Person, State, or Potentate theretofore claimed, used, or usurped within this Realm, or any Dominion or Country being within or under the Power, Dominion, or Obeisance of Her Highness, or to put in ure or execute any thing for the extolling, Advancement, setting forth, Maintenance, or De- fence of any such pretended or usurped Jurisdiction, Power, Pre-eminence, and Authority, or any Part thereof, or to abet, aid, procure, or counsel any Person so offending : Provided always, and be it declared, that nothing in this Enactment contained shall authorize or render it lawful for any Person or Persons to affirm, hold, stand with, set forth, maintain, or defend any such Foreign Power, Pre-eminence, Jurisdiction, or Authority, nor shall the same extend further than to the Repeal of the particular Penalties and Punishments therein referred to, but in all other respects the Law shall continue the same as if this Enactment had not been made: Provided further, that if any Person in Holy Orders according to the Rites and Ceremonies of the United Church of England and Ireland shall affirm, hold, stand with, set forth, maintain, or defend any such Foreign Power, Pre-eminence, Jurisdiction, or Authority, such Person shall be incapable of holding any Ecclesiastical Promotion, and, if in possession of any such Promotion, may be deprived thereof by due Course of Law, in the same Manner as for any other Cause of Deprivation.; As relates to a Person's resorting to his Parish Church or Chapel accustomed, or, upon reasonable Let thereof, to some usual Place where Common Prayer and such Service of God as in such Acts are mentioned are used in such Time of Let, upon Sundays and other Days ordained and used to be kept as holy Days, and to his then and there abiding orderly and soberly during the Time of the Common Prayer, Preaching, or other Service of God there used and ministered.
1 Eliz. 1. c. 2	Act of Uniformity 1558	An Act for the Uniformity of Common Prayer and Service in the Church, and the Administration of Sacraments.	As relates to a Person's resorting to his Parish Church or Chapel accustomed, or, upon reasonable Let thereof, to some usual Place where Common Prayer and such Service of God as in such Acts are mentioned are used in such Time of Let, upon Sundays and other Days ordained and used to be kept as holy Days, and to his then and there abiding orderly and soberly during the Time of the Common Prayer, Preaching, or other Service of God there used and ministered.
2 Eliz. 1. c. 2 (I)	Act of Supremacy (Ireland) 1560	An Act of the Parliament of Ireland passed in the Second Year of the same Queen's Reign, intituled An Act restoring to the Crown the auncient Jurisdiction of the State Ecclesiasticall and Spirituall, and abolishing all Forreinne Power repugnant to the same.	As makes it punishable to affirm, hold, stand with, set forth, maintain, or defend, as therein is mentioned, the Authority, Pre-eminence, Power, or Jurisdiction, Spiritual or Ecclesiastical, of any Foreign Prince, Prelate, Person, State, or Potentate theretofore claimed, used, or usurped within this Realm, or any Dominion or Country being within or under the Power, Dominion, or Obeisance of Her Highness, or to put in ure or execute any thing for the extolling, Advancement, setting forth, Maintenance, or De- fence of any such pretended or usurped Jurisdiction, Power, Pre-eminence, and Authority, or any Part thereof, or to abet, aid, procure, or counsel any Person so offending : Provided always, and be it declared, that nothing in this Enactment contained shall authorize or render it lawful for any Person or Persons to affirm, hold, stand with, set forth, maintain, or defend any such Foreign Power, Pre-eminence, Jurisdiction, or Authority, nor shall the same extend further than to the Repeal of the particular Penalties and Punishments therein referred to, but in all other respects the Law shall continue the same as if this Enactment had not been made: Provided further, that if any Person in Holy Orders according to the Rites and Ceremonies of the United Church of England and Ireland shall affirm, hold, stand with, set forth, maintain, or defend any such Foreign Power, Pre-eminence, Jurisdiction, or Authority, such Person shall be incapable of holding any Ecclesiastical Promotion, and, if in possession of any such Promotion, may be deprived thereof by due Course of Law, in the same Manner as for any other Cause of Deprivation.; As relates to a Person's resorting to his Parish Church or Chapel accustomed, or, upon reasonable Let thereof, to some usual Place where Common Prayer and such Service of God as in such Acts are mentioned are used in such Time of Let, upon Sundays and other Days ordained and used to be kept as holy Days, and to his then and there abiding orderly and soberly during the Time of the Common Prayer, Preaching, or other Service of God there used and ministered.
5 Eliz. 1. c. 1	Supremacy of the Crown Act 1562	An Act passed in the Fifth Year of the same Queen's Reign, intituled An Act for the Assurance of the Queen's Royal Power over all Estates and Subjects within Her Dominions	The whole act.
13 Eliz. 1. c. 2	Bulls, etc., from Rome Act 1571	An Act passed in the Thirteenth Year of the same Queen's Reign, intituled An Act against the bringing in and putting in execution of Bulls, Writings, or Instruments, and other superstitious Things from the See of Rome.	So far only as the same imposes the Penalties or Punishments therein mentioned; but it is hereby declared that nothing in this Enactment contained shall authorize or render it lawful for any Person or Persons to import, bring in, or put in execution within this Realm any such Bulls, Writings, or Instruments, and that in all respects, save as to the said Penalties or Punishments, the Law shall continue the same as if this Enactment had not been made.
29 Eliz. 1. c. 6 (Note: This is the citation in The Statutes of the Realm.)	Religion Act 1586	An Act passed in the Twenty-ninth Year of the same Queen's Reign, intituled An Act for the more speedy and due Execution of certain Branches of the Statute made in the Twenty-third Year of the Queen's Majesty's Reign, intituled 'An Act to retain the Queen's Majesty's Subjects in their due Obedience'.	The whole act.
1 Jas. 1. c. 4	Jesuits etc. Act 1603	An Act passed in the First Year of the Reign of King James the First, intituled An Act for the due Execution of the Statutes against Jesuits, Seminary Priests, Recusants, &c.	The whole act.
3 Jas. 1. c. 1	Observance of 5th November Act 1605	An Act passed in the Third Year of the Reign of the said King James the First, intituled An Act for a public Thanksgiving to Almighty God every Year on the Fifth Day of November.	As enacts, "that all and every Person and Persons inhabiting within this Realm of England and the Dominions of the same shall always upon that Day diligently and faithfully resort to the Parish Church or Chapel accustomed, or to some usual Church or Chapel where the said Morning Prayer, Preaching, or other Service of God shall be used, and then and there to abide orderly and soberly during the Time of the said Prayers, Preaching, or other Service of God there to be used and ministered". I.e., section 2.
3 Jas. 1. c. 4	Popish Recusants Act 1605	An Act passed in the said Third Year of the said King James's Reign, intituled An Act for the better discovering and repressing of Popish Recusants.	The whole act.
7 Jas. 1. c. 6	Oath of Allegiance, etc. Act 1609	An Act passed in the Seventh Year of the same King's Reign, intituled An Act for administering the Oath of Allegiance, and Reformation of married Women Recusants.	The whole act.
13 & 14 Cha. 2. c. 4	Act of Uniformity 1662	AnAct passed in the Thirteenth and Fourteenth Years of the Reign of King Charles the Second, intituled An Act for the Uniformity of Public Prayers, and Administration of Sacraments, and other Rites and Ceremonies, and for establishing the Form of making, ordaining, and consecrating Bishops, Priests, and Deacons in the Church of England.	As makes any Schoolmaster or other Person instructing or teaching Youth in any private House or Family as a Tutor or Schoolmaster punishable for instructing or teaching any Youth as a Tutor or Schoolmaster before Licence obtained from his respective Archbishop, Bishop, or Ordinary of the Diocese, according to the Laws and Statutes of this Realm, and before such Subscription and Acknowledgment made as in the said Act is mentioned. I.e., section 11.; Whereby any Act or Part of any Act herein before repealed has been confirmed or kept in force.; whereby the said Parts of the said Act of the Thirteenth and Fourteenth Years of the Reign ofKing Charles the Second herein- before repealed have been confirmed or incorporated in any other Act or Acts of Parliament.
17 & 18 Chas. 2. c. 6 (I)	Act of Uniformity 1665	An Act of the Parliament of Ireland passed in the Seventeenth and Eighteenth Years of the Reign of the said King Charles.	As requires that Schoolmasters or other Persons instructing or teaching Youth in private Houses or Families as Tutors or Schoolmasters should take the Oath of Allegiance and Supremacy, and as makes such Schoolmasters or other Persons punishable for so instructing or teaching Youth before Licence obtained from their respective Archbishop, Bishop, or Ordinary of the Diocese, and before such Subscription and Acknowledgment made as in the said Act is mentioned.
30 Cha. 2. Stat. 2. c. 1	Parliament Act 1678	An Act passed in the Thirtieth Year of the Reign of the said King Charles, intituled An Act for the more effectual preserving the King's Person and Government by disabling Papists from sitting in either House of Parliament.	As enacts that "every Person now or hereafter convicted of Popish Recusancy who hereafter shall, at any Time after the said First Day ofDecember, come advisedly into or remain in the Presence of the King's Majesty or Queen's Majesty, or shall come into the Court or House where they or any of them reside, as well during the Reign of His present Majesty (whose Life God long preserve) as during the Reigns of any of His Royal Successors, Kings or Queens of England, shall incur and suffer all the Pains, Penalties, Forfeitures, and Disabilities in this Act mentioned or contained".
1700 c. 5	Popery Act 1700	An Act of the Parliament of Scotland passed in the Eighth and Ninth Session of the First Parliament of King William the Third, intituled An Act for preventing the Growth of Popery.	The whole act and all Laws, Statutes, and Acts of Parliament revived, ratified, and perpetually confirmed by the said Act of King William's First Parliament, except as to the Form of the Formula in such last-mentioned Act contained.
11 Will. 3. c. 4	Popery Act 1698	An Act passed in the Eleventh and Twelfth Years of the Reign of the said King William the Third, intituled An Act for the further preventing the Growth of Popery.	The whole act.
1 Ann. c. 24	Protestant Children of Jews Act 1702	An Act passed in the First Year of the Reign of Queen Anne, intituled An Act to oblige Jews to maintain and provide for their Protestant Children.	The whole act.
2 Anne c. 6 (I)	Popery Act 1704	An Act of the Parliament of Ireland passed in the Second Year of the Reign of the said Queen Anne, intituled An Act to prevent the further Growth of Popery.	As enacts "that if any Person or Persons shall seduce, persuade, or pervert any Person or Persons professing or that shall pro- fess the Protestant Religion to renounce, forsake, or abjure the same, and to profess the Popish Religion, or reconcile him or them to the Church of Rome, then and in such Case every such Person and Persons so seducing, as also every such Protestant and Protestants who shall be so seduced, perverted, and reconciled to Popery, shall for the said Offences, being thereof lawfully convicted, incur the Danger and Penalty of Præmunire mentioned in the Statute of Præmunire made in England in the Sixteenth Year of the Reign of King Richard the Second". I.e., section 1.; As empowers the Court of Chancery to make such Order for the Maintenance of Protestant Children not maintained by their Popish Parents, suitable to the Degree and Ability of such Parents and to the Age of such Child, and also for the Portions of Protestant Children to be paid at the Decease of their Popish Parents, as that Court shall adjudge fit, suitable to the Degree and Ability of such Parents, and as empowers the said Court to make such Order for the educating in the Protestant Religion the Children of Papists, where either the Father or Mother of such Children shall be Protestants, till the Age of Eighteen Years of such Children, as to that Court shall seem meet, and in order thereto to limit and appoint where, and in what Manner, and by whom, such Children shall be educated ; and as enacts that the Father of such Children shall pay the Charges of such Education as shall be directed by the said Court.
11 Geo. 2. c. 17	Church Patronage Act 1737	AnAct passed in the Eleventh Year of the Reign ofKing George the Second, intituled An Act for securing the Estates ofPapists conforming to the Protestant Religion against Disabilities created by several Acts of Parliament relating to Papists; and for rendering more effectual the several Acts ofParliament made for vesting in the Two Universities in that Part of Great Britain called England the Presentation ofBenefices belonging to Papists.	Except so much of the said Act as relates to any Advowson, or Right of Presentation, Collation, Nomination, or Donation of or to any Benefice, Pre- bend, or Ecclesiastical Living, School, Hospital, or Donative, or any Grant or Avoidance thereof, or any Admission, Institution, or Induction to be made thereupon, but so as that the Repeal of the said Act shall not in anywise affect or prejudice the Right, Title, or Interest of any Person in or to any Lands, Tenements, or Hereditaments under and by virtue of the Provisions of the said Act at the Time of such Repeal.
17 & 18 Geo. 3. c. 49 (I)	Leases for Lives Act 1777	An Act of the Parliament of Ireland passed in the Seventeenth and Eighteenth Years of the Reign of King George the Third, intituled An Act for the Relief of His Majesty's Subjects of this Kingdom professing the Popish Religion.	As enacts "that no Maintenance or Portion shall be granted to any Child of aPopish Parent, upon a Bill filed against such Parent pursuant to the aforesaid Act of the Second of Queen Anne, out of the Personal Property of such Papist, except out of such Leases which they may hereafter take under the Powers granted in this Act".
18 Geo. 3. c. 60	Papists Act 1778	An Act passed in the Eighteenth Year of the Reign of the said King George the Third, intituled An Act for relieving His Majesty's Subjects professing the Popish Religion from certain Penalties and Disabilities imposed on them by an Act made in the Eleventh and Twelfth Years of theReign of King William the Third, intituled An Act for ' the further preventing the Growth of Popery'.	As enacts "that nothing in this Act contained shall extend or be construed to extend to any Popish Bishop, Priest, Jesuit, or Schoolmaster who shall not have taken and subscribed the above Oath in the above Words before he shall have been apprehended, or any Prosecution commenced against him". I.e., section 5.
23 & 24 Geo. 3. c. 38 (I)	Naturalization Act 1783	An Act of the Parliament of Ireland passed in the Twenty-third and Twenty-fourth Years of the Reign of the said King George the Third, intituled An Act for extending the Provisions of an Act passed in this Kingdom in the Nineteenth and Twentieth Years of His Majesty's intituled 'An Act for naturalizing such Foreign Merchants, Traders, Artificers, Artizans, Manufacturers, Workmen, Seamen, Farmers, and others, as shall settle in this Kingdom'.	As excepts out of the Benefit of that Act Persons professing the Jewish Religion.
31 Geo. 3. c. 32	Roman Catholic Relief Act 1791	An Act passed in the Thirty-first Year of the Reign of the said King George the Third, intituled An Act to relieve, upon Conditions and under Restrictions, the Persons therein described from certain Penalties and Disabilities to which Papists or Persons professing the Popish Religion are by Law subject.	As enacts "that nothing herein contained shall be construed to give any Ease, Benefit, or Advantage to any Person who shall, by Preaching, Teaching, or Writing, deny or gainsay the Oath of Allegiance, Abjuration, and Declaration herein-before mentioned and appointed to be taken as aforesaid, or the Declarations or Doctrines therein contained, or any of them". I.e., section 12.; As provides and enacts, "that no Schoolmaster professing the Roman Catholic Religion shall receive into his School for Education the Child of any Protestant Father". I.e., section 15.; As provides and enacts, " that no Person professing the Roman Catholic Religion shall be permitted to keep a School for the Education of Youth until his or her Name and Description as a Roman Catholic Schoolmaster or Schoolmistress shall have been recorded at the Quarter or General Session of the Peace for the County or other Division or Place where such School shall be situated, by the Clerk of the Peace of the said Court, who is hereby required to record such Name and Description accordingly upon Demand by such Person, and to give a Certificate thereof to such Person as shall at any Time demand the same, and no Person offending in the Premises shall receive any Benefit of this Act". I.e., section 16.
33 Geo. 3. c. 21 (I)	Roman Catholic Relief Act 1793	An Act of the Parliament of Ireland passed in the Thirty- third Year of the Reign of the said King George the Third, intituled An Act for the Relief of His Majesty's Popish or Roman Catholic Subjects of Ireland.	As provides "that no Papist or Roman Catholic, or Person professing the Roman Catholic or Popish Religion, shall take any Benefit by or under this Act, unless he shall have first taken and subscribed the Oath and Declaration in this Act contained and set forth, and also the said Oath appointed by the said Act passed in the Thirteenth and Fourteenth Years of His Majesty's Reign, intituled An Act to enable His Majesty's Subjects, of whatever Persuasion, to testify their Allegiance to Him in some One of His Majesty's Four Courts in Dublin, or at the General Sessions of the Peace, or at any Adjournment thereof, to be holden for the County, City, or Borough, wherein such Papist or Roman Catholic, or Person pro- fessing the Roman Catholic or Popish Religion, doth inhabit or dwell, or before the going Judge or Judges ofAssize in the County wherein such Papist or Roman Catholic, or Person professing the Roman Catholic or Popish Religion, doth inhabit and dwell, in open Court".
33 Geo. 3. c. 44	Roman Catholics Act 1793	An Act passed in the said Thirty-third Year of the Reign of the said King George the Third, intituled An Act for requiring a certain Form of Oath ofAbjuration and Declaration from His Majesty's Subjects professing the Roman Catholic Religion in that Part of Great Britain called Scotland.	The whole act.

== Subsequent developments ==
Section 1 of the act, so far as unrepealed, was repealed by section 1 of, and part II of the schedule to, the Statute Law (Repeals) Act 1969, which came into force on 1 January 1970.

Section 4 of the act was repealed for Great Britain by section 1(1) of, and part V of schedule 1 to, the Statute Law (Repeals) Act 1977, which came into force on 16 June 1977.

The whole act was repealed by section 1(1) of, and part VIII of schedule 1 to, the Statute Law (Repeals) Act 1989, which came into force on 16 November 1989.

== See also ==
- Roman Catholic Relief Act 1829
