= Act of Uniformity 1551 =

Act of the Parliament of England concerning religion and the Church of England

Act of Uniformity 1551 (Note: The citation of this act by this short title was authorised by section 5 of, and the second schedule to, the Statute Law Revision Act 1948. Due to the repeal of those provisions, it is now authorised by section 19(2) of the Interpretation Act 1978.)
- Act of Parliament
- Parliament of England
- Long title: An Acte for the Unyformytie of Comon Prayer and admynistracion of the Sacramentes. (Note: These words are printed against this act in the second column of the second schedule to the Statute Law Revision Act 1948, which is headed "Title".)
- Citation: 5 & 6 Edw. 6. c. 1
- Territorial extent: England and Wales; Ireland

Dates
- Royal assent: 15 April 1552
- Commencement: 1 November 1552 (Note: Section 1. The Feast of All Saints])
- Repealed: Northern Ireland: 23 May 1950; England and Wales: 1 January 1970
Other legislation
Amended by	Roman Catholics Act 1844; Religious Disabilities Act 1846
Repealed by	Northern Ireland: Statute Law Revision Act 1950; England and Wales: Statute Law (Repeals) Act 1969
Relates to	Act of Uniformity 1548; Act of Uniformity 1558

Status: Repealed

Text of statute as originally enacted

The Act of Uniformity 1551 (5 & 6 Edw. 6. c. 1), sometimes referred to as the Act of Uniformity 1552, or the Uniformity Act 1551 was an act of the Parliament of England.

It was enacted by King Edward VI to supersede his previous Act of Uniformity 1548 (2 & 3 Edw. 6. c. 1). It was one of the last steps taken by the 'boy king' and his councillors to make England a more Protestant country before his death the following year. It replaced the 1549 Book of Common Prayer authorised by the Act of Uniformity 1548 (2 & 3 Edw. 6. c. 1) with a revised and more clearly Protestant version, the 1552 Book of Common Prayer. Cranmer, the principal author of both the 1549 and 1552 versions of the liturgy maintained that there was no theological difference between the two.

Anyone who attended or administered a service where this liturgy was not used faced six months imprisonment for a first offence, one year for a second offence, and life for a third. The act was repealed by Queen Mary I in 1553.

== Liturgical changes effected ==
The Edwardine reformation represented a combination of moderate reformed theology with relatively traditional structures of the ministry and church government which were justified at the time by an appeal to the Early Church before Romish errors had corrupted it.

Transubstantiation had already been dropped implicitly by the elimination from the 1549 rite of both the elevation of the host and the "shewing of the Sacrament to the people" during the prayer of consecration. However, late in 1552 after the new prayer book had passed through Parliament, John Knox launched a strong attack on the requirement to kneel to receive communion. Archbishop Thomas Cranmer persuaded the Privy Council to retain the practice, and the Council approved a declaration in its defence which is commonly known as the "Black Rubric", which was pasted into the earliest printed editions on a slip of paper.

Notably, following Elizabeth I assuming the throne, the 1552 ordinal that had accompanied the 1552 Book of Common Prayer was thought to have been authorized under the Act of Uniformity 1558 (1 Eliz. 1. c. 2). However, William Cecil, Elizabeth's Secretary of State, advised the queen that the act made no mention of the ordinal and that Thomas Cranmer's ordination liturgy was illegal.

== Mary I's reforms and Elizabeth I's restorations ==
After Edward VI's death, his sister Mary I proceeded to bring the English clergy back under the auspices of the Catholic Church. She repealed all her brother's religious laws and imprisoned the country's leading Protestant clerics. In addition, she had her mother's marriage to Henry VIII declared valid. Later on, her husband Philip II of Spain persuaded Parliament to repeal all of Henry VIII's religious laws, thereby returning England to the control of the Church in Rome.

When Mary I died in 1558 and her sister Elizabeth came to the throne, Catholic clergy sought to block her wish to make reforms that would turn the Church in England back in the direction of Protestantism. Elizabeth was fortunate in that many of the bishoprics of the country were vacant, which meant that the remaining bishops could not outvote the lay members of the House of Lords who supported reform. A new Act of Uniformity 1558 (1 Eliz. 1. c. 2) was passed; Mary I's heresy laws were also repealed, in order to make punishments for violating the act less severe. The Church of England then started to use the 1552 Book of Common Prayer with a few pre-Reformation modifications (notably the omission of the "Black Rubric)".

For more details of the further history of this act see Act of Uniformity 1548 (2 & 3 Edw. 6. c. 1).

== Subsequent developments ==
So much of the act "as relates to the offence of willingly and wittingly hearing and being present at any other manner or form of common prayer, of administration of the sacraments, of making of ministers in the churches, or of any other rites contained in the book annexed to that act, than is mentioned and set forth in such book, so far as the same in any manner affects Roman catholics." was repealed by section 1 of the Roman Catholics Act 1844 (7 & 8 Vict. c. 102), which came into force on 9 August 1844.

The following provisions were repealed by section 1 of the Religious Disabilities Act 1846 (9 & 10 Vict. c. 59), which came into force on 18 August 1846. The marginal note to section 1 of the 1846 act said that the effect of this was to repeal sections 1–4 and 6 of the act.

- So much of act as enacted "that from and after Feast of All Saints next coming all and every Person and Persons inhabiting within this Realm, or any other of the King's Majesty's Dominions, shall diligently and faithfully, having no lawful or reasonable Excuse to be absent, endeavour themselves to resort to their Parish Church or Chapel accustomed, or, upon reasonable Let thereof, to some usual Place where Common Prayer and such Service of God shall be used in such Time of Let, upon every Sunday, and other Days ordained and used to be kept as holy Days, and then and there to abide orderly and soberly during the Time of Common Prayer, Preachings, or other Service of God there to be used and ministered, upon Pain of Punishment by the Censures of the Church", so far as the same affected persons dissenting from the worship or doctrines of the United Church of England and Ireland, and usually attending place of worship other than the Established Church. (This repeal was subject to a proviso that no pecuniary penalty was to be imposed upon any person by reason of his so absenting himself as aforesaid.)
- So much of the act as enacted "that if any Manner of Person or Persons inhabiting and being within this Realme, or any other the King's Majesty's Dominions, shall, after the said Feast of All Saints, willingly and wittingly hear and be present at any other Manner or Form of Common Prayer, of Administration of the Sacraments, of making of Ministers in the Churches, or of any other Rites contained in the Book annexed to this Act than is mentioned and set forth in the said Book, or that is contrary to the Form of sundry Provisions and Exceptions contained in the aforesaid former Statute, and shall be thereof convicted according to the Laws of this Realm, before the Justices of Assize, the Justices of Oyer and Determiner, Justices of Peace in their Sessions, or any of them, by the Verdict of Twelve Men, or by his or their own Confession, or otherwise, shall, for the First Offence suffer Imprisonment for Six Months, without Bail or Mainprize, and for the Second offence, being likewise convicted as is above-said, Imprisonment for One whole Year, and for the Third Offence, in the like Manner, Imprisonment during his or their Lives".
- So much of the act as enacted "that for the more Knowledge to be given hereof, and better Observation of this Law, all and singular Curates shall, upon one Sunday every Quarter of the Year, during One whole Year next following the foresaid Feast of All Saints next coming, read this present Act in the Church at the Time of the most Assembly, and likewise once in every Year following, at the same Time declaring unto the People, by the Authority of the Scripture, how the Mercy and Goodness of God hath in all Ages been shown to his People in their Necessities and Extremities, by means of hearty and faithful Prayers made to Almighty God, especially where People be gathered together with One Faith and Mind to offer up their Hearts by Prayer as the best Sacrifices that Christian Men can yield".
- So much of any act or acts of the Parliament of Ireland as may have extended to Ireland the provisions of the act, so far as the same was thereby repealed.

The whole act was repealed for Northern Ireland by section 1(1) of, and the first schedule to, the Statute Law Revision Act 1950 (14 Geo. 6. c. 6), which came into force on 23 May 1950.

The whole act, so far as unrepealed, was repealed by section 1 of, and part II of the schedule to, the Statute Law (Repeals) Act 1969, which came into force on 1 January 1970.

== See also ==
- Act of Uniformity
