= List of acts of the Parliament of England from 1605 =

This is a list of acts of the Parliament of England for the year 1605.

For acts passed during the period 1707–1800, see the list of acts of the Parliament of Great Britain. See also the list of acts of the Parliament of Scotland, and the list of acts of the Parliament of Ireland.

For acts passed from 1801 onwards, see the list of acts of the Parliament of the United Kingdom. For acts of the devolved parliaments and assemblies in the United Kingdom, see the list of acts of the Scottish Parliament, the list of acts of the Northern Ireland Assembly, and the list of acts and measures of Senedd Cymru; see also the list of acts of the Parliament of Northern Ireland.

For medieval statutes, etc. that are not considered to be acts of Parliament, see the list of English statutes.

See also the List of ordinances and acts of the Parliament of England, 1642–1660 for ordinances and acts passed by the Long Parliament and other bodies without royal assent, and which were not considered to be valid legislation following the Restoration in 1660.

The number shown after each act's title is its chapter number. Acts are cited using this number, preceded by the years of the reign during which the relevant parliamentary session was held; thus the Union with Ireland Act 1800 is cited as "39 & 40 Geo. 3. c. 67", meaning the 67th act passed during the session that started in the 39th year of the reign of George III and which finished in the 40th year of that reign. The modern convention is to use Arabic numerals in citations (thus "41 Geo. 3" rather than "41 Geo. III"). Acts of the last session of the Parliament of Great Britain and the first session of the Parliament of the United Kingdom are both cited as "41 Geo. 3".

Acts passed by the Parliament of England did not have a short title; however, some of these acts have subsequently been given a short title by acts of the Parliament of the United Kingdom, such as the Short Titles Act 1896 (59 & 60 Vict. c. 14).

Acts passed by the Parliament of England were deemed to have come into effect on the first day of the session in which they were passed. Because of this, the years given in the list below may in fact be the year before a particular act was passed.

== 3 Jas. 1 ==
The second session of the 1st Parliament of King James I (the 'Blessed Parliament'), which met from 5 November 1605 until 27 May 1606.

The opening of the session on 5 November 1605 was overtaken by the discovery of the Gunpowder Plot; the Lords next sat on 9 November 1605 and, after a prorogation, again on 21 January 1606.

This session was traditionally cited as 3 Jac. 1, 3 Ja. 1, 3 J. 1 or 3 & 4 Jac. 1.

=== Public acts ===
Short title	Citation	Royal assent
Long title
Observance of 5th November Act 1605 or the Thanksgiving Act 1605 (repealed)	3 Jas. 1. c. 1	27 May 1606
An Acte for a Publicque Thancksgiving to Almighty God everie Yeare on the fifte day of November. (Repealed for England and Wales by Anniversary Days Observance Act 1859 (22 Vict. c. 2) and for the Isle of Man by Statute Law Revision (Isle of Man) Act 1991 (c. 61))
Attainder of Guy Fawkes and Others Act 1605 (repealed)	3 Jas. 1. c. 2	27 May 1606
An Acte for the Attaindors of divers Offendors in the late moste barbarous monstrous destestable and damnable Treasons. (Repealed by Statute Law (Repeals) Act 1977 (c. 18))
Union of England and Scotland Act 1605 (repealed)	3 Jas. 1. c. 3	27 May 1606
An Act declaratorie, explayning a branche of an Acte made in the first Session of this Parliament, intituled, "An Acte authorizing certaine Comissioners of the Realme of Englande to treat with Comissioners of Scotlande for the Weale of both Kingdomes." (Note: Union of England and Scotland Act 1603 (1 Jas. 1. c. 2)) (Repealed by Statute Law Revision Act 1863 (26 & 27 Vict. c. 125))
Popish Recusants Act 1605 (repealed)	3 Jas. 1. c. 4	27 May 1606
An Act for the better discovering and repressing of Popish Recusants. (Repealed by Religious Disabilities Act 1846 (9 & 10 Vict. c. 59))
Presentation of Benefices Act 1605 (repealed)	3 Jas. 1. c. 5	27 May 1606
An Act to prevent and avoid Dangers which may grow by Popish Recusants. (Repealed by Patronage (Benefices) Measure 1986 (No. 3))
Foreign Trade Act 1605 (repealed)	3 Jas. 1. c. 6	27 May 1606
An Acte to enable all his Majesties loving Subjects of Englande and Wales to trade freely into the Dominions of Spaine Portugale and France. (Repealed by Repeal of Acts Concerning Importation Act 1822 (3 Geo. 4. c. 41))
Attorneys Act 1605 (repealed)	3 Jas. 1. c. 7	27 May 1606
An Acte to reforme the Multitudes and Misdemeanors of Attorneyes and Sollicitors at Lawe, and to avoide sundrie unneccessarie Suits and Charges in Lawe. (Repealed by Solicitors Act 1843 (6 & 7 Vict. c. 73))
Execution Act 1605 (repealed)	3 Jas. 1. c. 8	27 May 1606
An Act for avoiding of unneccessarie Delaies of Executions. (Repealed by Statute Law Revision Act 1863 (26 & 27 Vict. c. 125))
Skinners Act 1605 (repealed)	3 Jas. 1. c. 9	27 May 1606
An Acte for the Reliefe of suche as lawfully use the Trade and Handicrafte of Skynners. (Repealed by Repeal of Obsolete Statutes Act 1856 (19 & 20 Vict. c. 64))
Conveyance of Offenders to Gaol Act 1605 (repealed)	3 Jas. 1. c. 10	27 May 1606
An Acte for the rating and levying of the Charges for conveying Malefactors and Offendors to the Gaole. (Repealed by Criminal Justice Administration Act 1914 (4 & 5 Geo. 5. c. 58))
Exportation Act 1605 (repealed)	3 Jas. 1. c. 11	27 May 1606
An Act for the transportacion of Beere over the Seas. (Repealed by Repeal of Acts Concerning Importation Act 1822 (3 Geo. 4. c. 41))
Fish Act 1605 (repealed)	3 Jas. 1. c. 12	27 May 1606
An Act for the better preservation of Sea Fishe. (Repealed by Salmon Fishery Act 1861 (24 & 25 Vict. c. 109))
Stealing of Deer, etc. Act 1605 (repealed)	3 Jas. 1. c. 13	27 May 1606
An Act against unlawfull hunting and stealing of Deere and Connies. (Repealed for England and Wales by Criminal Statutes Repeal Act 1827 (7 & 8 Geo. 4. c. 27) and for India by Criminal Law (India) Act 1828 (9 Geo. 4. c. 74))
Thames Commission of Sewers Act 1605 or London Watercourses (Commissioners of Sewers) Act 1605 (repealed)	3 Jas. 1. c. 14	27 May 1606
An Acte for explanacion of the Statute of Sewers. (Repealed by Land Drainage Act 1930 (20 & 21 Geo. 5. c. 44))
City of London Court of Conscience Act 1605 or Small Debts, London City Act 1605 or London City Small Debts Act 1605 (repealed)	3 Jas. 1. c. 15	27 May 1606
An Act for the recovering of small Debts, and for the relieving of poor Debtors in London. (Repealed by City of London Court of Requests Act 1835 (5 & 6 Will. 4. c. xciv))
Kerseys Act 1605 (repealed)	3 Jas. 1. c. 16	27 May 1606
An Act for the Repeal of One Act made in the Fourteenth Year of Queen Elizabeth's Reign concerning the Length of Kersies. (Repealed by Repeal of Obsolete Statutes Act 1856 (19 & 20 Vict. c. 64))
Welsh Cottons Act 1605 (repealed)	3 Jas. 1. c. 17	27 May 1606
An Acte concerning Walsh Cottons. (Repealed by Repeal of Obsolete Statutes Act 1856 (19 & 20 Vict. c. 64))
New River Act 1605	3 Jas. 1. c. 18	27 May 1606
An Acte for the bringing in of a freshe Streame of running Water to the Northe parts of the City of London.
Highways at Long Ditton Act 1605 (repealed)	3 Jas. 1. c. 19	27 May 1606
An Act for the repairing and maintaining of the highway leading from Kingston to Nonsuch. (Repealed by Statute Law Revision Act 1948 (11 & 12 Geo. 6. c. 62))
River Thames Act 1605 (repealed)	3 Jas. 1. c. 20	27 May 1606
An Acte for clearing the Passage of Water from London to and beyond the Citye of Oxforde. (Repealed by Thames Navigation Act 1623 (21 Jas. 1. c. 32))
Theatre Regulation Act 1605 (repealed)	3 Jas. 1. c. 21	27 May 1606
An Acte to restraine Abuses of Players. (Repealed by Theatres Act 1843 (6 & 7 Vict. c. 68))
Drury Lane Paving Act 1605 (repealed)	3 Jas. 1. c. 22	27 May 1606
An Act for paving of Drury Lane and the Towne of St. Giles in the Fieldes within the County of Middlesex. (Repealed by Statute Law Revision Act 1948 (11 & 12 Geo. 6. c. 62))
Chepstow Bridge (Maintenance, etc.) Act 1605 (repealed)	3 Jas. 1. c. 23	27 May 1606
An Act for the newe making upp and keeping in Reparacion of Chepstow Bridge. (Repealed by Statute Law Revision Act 1948 (11 & 12 Geo. 6. c. 62))
Upton-upon-Severn Bridge (Maintenance, etc.) Act 1605 (repealed)	3 Jas. 1. c. 24	27 May 1606
An Act for the reedifying of a Bridge over the River of Seaverne neare the Towne of Upton upon Seaverne. (Repealed by Statute Law Revision Act 1948 (11 & 12 Geo. 6. c. 62))
Taxation Act 1605 (repealed)	3 Jas. 1. c. 25	27 May 1606
An Acte Confirmacion of the Subsidies graunted by the Clergie. (Repealed by Statute Law Revision Act 1863 (26 & 27 Vict. c. 125))
Taxation (No. 2) Act 1605 (repealed)	3 Jas. 1. c. 26	27 May 1606
An Acte for the Grant of three entire Subsidies and Six Fifteenes and Tenthes granted by the Temporalty. (Repealed by Statute Law Revision Act 1863 (26 & 27 Vict. c. 125))
Act of General Pardon 1605 (repealed)	3 Jas. 1. c. 27	27 May 1606
An Acte for the Kinges Majesties most gracious generall and free Pardon. (Repealed by Statute Law Revision Act 1863 (26 & 27 Vict. c. 125))

=== Private acts ===
Short title	Citation	Royal assent
Long title
Assurance of ground to Earl of Salisbury for enlargement of Salisbury House, Strand.	3 Jas. 1. c. 1 Pr.	27 May 1606
An act for the assuring of certain small parcels of ground to Robert earl of Salisbury and his heirs, for the inlargement and commodious use of his mansion house in the Strand, now called Salisbury house, and for recompense to be given for the same.
Assurance of the Countess of Essex's jointure.	3 Jas. 1. c. 2 Pr.	27 May 1606
An Act for the assurance of the jointure of the right honourable Frances countess of Essex, wife of the right honourable Robert earl of Essex.
Corpus Christi College Oxford Act 1605	3 Jas. 1. c. 3 Pr.	27 May 1606
An act for the president and scholars of Corpus Christi college in the university of Oxford.
Lord Windsor's Estate Act 1605	3 Jas. 1. c. 4 Pr.	27 May 1606
An Act for the better sale of certain lands of Henry late lord Windsor, deceased, for payment of his debts, and better performance of his last will and testament.
Establishing the possessions and inheritance of Edmond, late Lord Chandos.	3 Jas. 1. c. 5 Pr.	27 May 1606
An Act for the establishing of the possessions and inheritance of Edmund late lord Chandos of Sudeley, deceased.
Vesting in the Crown the estates of Lord Cobham and George Brooke, attainted of high treason, with a confirmation of grants made by the King.	3 Jas. 1. c. 6 Pr.	27 May 1606
An Act to establish in the crown the lands and possessions of Henry late lord Cobham, and George Brooke, esquire, attainted of high treason, with a confirmation of grants made by his Majesty.
Confirmation of leases by Lord Spencer and his parents.	3 Jas. 1. c. 7 Pr.	27 May 1606
An Act for the confirmation of certain leases and estates made by the right honourable Robert lord Spencer, and by his late father deceased, and his mother now living.
Restoration of Lord Danvers as heir to Sir John Danvers notwithstanding the attainder of his brother, Sir Charles Danvers.	3 Jas. 1. c. 8 Pr.	27 May 1606
An Act for the restoring and enabling of Henry lord Danvers, as son and heir to sir John Danvers, knight, deceased, notwithstanding the attainder and corruption of blood of sir Charles Danvers, knight, deceased, elder brother of the said lord Danvers.
Oriel College, Oxford, confirmation of letters patent.	3 Jas. 1. c. 9 Pr.	27 May 1606
An act for the confirmation of the King's majesty's letters patents made to the provost and scholars of Oriel college in Oxford.
St. Bees' Grammar School (Cumberland): confirmation of letters patent.	3 Jas. 1. c. 10 Pr.	27 May 1606
An Act for confirmation of letters patents made to the governors of the free grammar school at Saint Bees, in the county of Cumberland.
Sir Christopher Hatton's Estate Act 1605	3 Jas. 1. c. 11 Pr.	27 May 1606
An Act to enable sir Christopher Hatton, knight, to dispose of certain lands, tenements and hereditaments, notwithstanding a limitation or clause of perpetuity annexed to his estate.
Sale of lands in Middlesex to Sir Thomas Lake and Dame Mary Knight his wife.	3 Jas. 1. c. 12 Pr.	27 May 1606
An Act to assure and confirm the sale of certain lands lying within the county of Middlesex, to Thomas Lake, knight, and dame Mary, his wife.
Sir Jonathan Trelawney's Estate Act 1605	3 Jas. 1. c. 13 Pr.	27 May 1606
An Act for sale of certain lands of sir Jonathan Trelowny, knight, deceased, for payment of his debts.
Assurance of Dame Elinor Cave's jointure.	3 Jas. 1. c. 14 Pr.	27 May 1606
An Act for the assuring of the jointure of dame Elionor Cave, wife of sir Thomas Cave of Standforde, in the county of Northampton, knight.
Hotham's Estate Act 1605	3 Jas. 1. c. 15 Pr.	27 May 1606
An Act for the enabling of John Hotham, esquire, the father, and John Hotham, his son, to convey certain lands for a jointure of such wife as John the son shall marry.
Settlement of Manor of Rie on William Throckmorton.	3 Jas. 1. c. 16 Pr.	27 May 1606
An Act for the settling of the manor of Rye in the counties of Gloucester and Worcester, upon William Throckmorton, esquire, and his heirs, according to a feoffment thereof made by Charles late earl of Devonshire.
Sir Thomas Rous' Estate Act 1605	3 Jas. 1. c. 17 Pr.	27 May 1606
An Act for the more speedy sale of certain lands of sir Thomas Rowse, knight, for payment of his debts.
Sir John Skynner's Estate Act 1605	3 Jas. 1. c. 18 Pr.	27 May 1606
An Act for the assurance of certain lands late sir John Skinner's, knight, to sir William Smith and sir Michael Hickes, knights.
John Roger's relief for a breach of trust made by Robert, Paul and William Taylor.	3 Jas. 1. c. 19 Pr.	27 May 1606
An Act for the relief of John Roger, gentleman, against Robert Taylor, Paul Taylor, and William Taylor, for defrauding of a trust reposed in Thomas Taylor their father, and decreed against them in the high court of chancery.
Assurance of lands of Walter Walshe.	3 Jas. 1. c. 20 Pr.	27 May 1606
An Act for the assurance of the lands of Walter Walsh, esquire.
Edward Downes' Estate Act 1605	3 Jas. 1. c. 21 Pr.	27 May 1606
An Act for sale of certain lands of Edward Downes, esquire, for payment of his debts.
Naturalization of Sir Daniel Foulis and confirmation of letters patent.	3 Jas. 1. c. 22 Pr.	27 May 1606
An act for the naturalizing of sir David Foulis, knight, and for confirmation of letters patents by his most excellent Majesty to him made.
Naturalization of Sir Edward Conway's children.	3 Jas. 1. c. 23 Pr.	27 May 1606
An act for the naturalizing of the children of sir Edward Conway, knight, lieutenant governor of the King's majesty's cautionary town of the Brill.
Naturalization of Sir James Areskyn and family.	3 Jas. 1. c. 24 Pr.	27 May 1606
An act for the naturalizing of sir James Areskyn, knight, his wife and children.
Naturalization of Sir David Murray and Thomas Murray.	3 Jas. 1. c. 25 Pr.	27 May 1606
An act for the naturalizing of sir David Murray, knight, gentleman of the Prince his bedchamber, and Thomas Murray, esquire, schoolmaster to the duke of York.
Naturalization of Daniel Godfrey.	3 Jas. 1. c. 26 Pr.	27 May 1606
An act for the naturalizing of Daniel Godfrey of the parish of Saint Buttolphes without Algate, gentleman.
Restitution in blood of John and Thomas Holland.	3 Jas. 1. c. 27 Pr.	27 May 1606
An act for the restitution in blood of John Holland son of Brian Holland, and Thomas Holland son of the said John Holland.
Restitution in blood of Roland Meyrick and Dame Margaret Knight.	3 Jas. 1. c. 28 Pr.	27 May 1606
An Act for the restitution of Rowlande Mericke, son of sir Gelley Mericke, knight, and dame Margaret, wife of Sir John Vaughan, knight, daughter of the said sir Gellley, in blood.
Execution of Chancery decree between William le Gris and Robert Cottrell.	3 Jas. 1. c. 29 Pr.	27 May 1606
An Act for the performance and execution of a decree in the chancery, made between William le Gris, plaintiff, and Robert Cottrell, defendant.

=== Sources ===
- Raithby, John, ed. (1963) [1819]. "3° Jac.". Statutes of the Realm. Vol. 4 Part 2: The Statutes of Queen Elizabeth (An. 28-43) and of King James (1586–1623). London: Dawsons. pp. 1065–1131 – via HathiTrust.
- Raithby, John, ed. (1963) [1819]. "3° Jac.". Statutes of the Realm. Vol. 4 Part 2: The Statutes of Queen Elizabeth (An. 28-43) and of King James (1586–1623). London: Dawsons. p. 1065-1131 – via Google Books.
- Raithby, John, ed. (1963) [1819]. "3° Jac.". Statutes of the Realm. Vol. 4 Part 2: The Statutes of Queen Elizabeth (An. 28-43) and of King James (1586–1623). London: Dawsons. p. 1065-1131 – via Internet Archive.
- Pickering, Danby, ed. (1763). "Anno tertio Jacobi". The Statutes at Large. Vol. 7: From the Thirty-ninth Year of Q. Elizabeth to the Twelfth Year of K. Charles. Inclusive. Cambridge: Joseph Bentham. pp. 145–195 – via Internet Archive.
- Journal of the House of Commons. Vol. 1 – 1547-1629. His Majesty's Stationery Office. 1802 – via British History Online.
- Journal of the House of Lords. Vol. 2: 1578-1614. London: His Majesty's Stationery Office. 1830 – via British History Online.
- Chronological Table of and Index to the Statutes. Vol. 1: To the End of the Session 59 Vict. Sess. 2 (1895) (13th ed.). London: Her Majesty's Stationery Office. 1896. p. 65 – via Google Books.
- Chronological Table of the Statutes: Covering the Period from 1235 to the End of 1971. London: Her Majesty's Stationery Office. 1972. p. 63. ISBN 978-0-11-840096-1 – via Google Books.
- "Chronological Tables of the Private and Personal Acts: Part 2 (1603–1640)". legislation.gov.uk. The National Archives.

== See also ==
- List of acts of the Parliament of England
