= Observance of 5th November Act 1605 =

Act of the Parliament of England

- Act of Parliament
- Parliament of England
- Long title: An act for a publick thanksgiving to Almighty God every year on the fifth day of November.
- Citation: 3 Jas. 1. c. 1
- Introduced by: Edward Montagu
- Territorial extent: England and Wales; Isle of Man

Dates
- Royal assent: 27 May 1606
- Commencement: 6 January 1606 (Note: Start of session.)
- Repealed: England and Wales: 25 March 1859; Isle of Man: 25 July 1991

Other legislation
- Amended by: Roman Catholics Act 1844; Religious Disabilities Act 1846
- Repealed by: Anniversary Days Observance Act 1859
- Relates to: Popish Recusants Act 1605; Presentation of Benefices Act 1605

Status: Repealed

Text of statute as originally enacted

The Observance of 5th November Act 1605 (3 Jas. 1. c. 1), also known as the Thanksgiving Act 1605, was an act of the Parliament of England passed in 1606 in the aftermath of the Gunpowder Plot.

The originating bill was drafted and introduced on 23 January 1606 (New Style) by Edward Montagu and called for an annual public thanksgiving for the failure of the plot. It required church ministers to hold a special service of thanksgiving annually on 5 November, during which the text of the act was to be read out loud. Everyone was required to attend, and to remain orderly throughout the service, although no penalties were prescribed for breach. The act remained on the statute book until 1859.

== Preamble ==
The preamble to the act set out the political background, noting that:

"many malignant and devilish Papists, Jesuits, and Seminary Priests, much envying and fearing, conspired most horribly, when the King's most excellent Majesty, the Queen, the Prince, and the Lords Spiritual and Temporal, and Commons, should have been assembled in the Upper House of Parliament upon the Fifth Day of November in the Year of our Lord One thousand six hundred and five, suddenly to have blown up the said whole House with Gunpowder : An Invention so inhuman, barbarous and cruel, as the like was never before heard of".

It further stated that, as some of the principal conspirators had confessed, the conspiracy was purposely devised to be done in the House:

"where sundry necessary and religious Laws for Preservation of the Church and State were made, which they falsely and slanderously term Cruel Laws, enacted against them and their Religion, both Places and Persons should all be destroyed and blown up at once; which would have turned to the utter Ruin of this whole Kingdom, had it not pleased Almighty God, by inspiring the King's most excellent Majesty with a Divine Spirit, to interpret some dark Phrases of a Letter showed to his Majesty, above and beyond ordinary Construction, thereby miraculously discovering this hidden Treason not many Hours before the appointed Time for the Execution thereof".

The preamble concluded by setting out the purpose of the act:

"And to the End this unfeigned Thankfulness may never be forgotten, but be had in a perpetual Remembrance, that all Ages to come may yield Praises to his Divine Majesty for the same, and have in Memory this joyful Day of Deliverance" ...

== Provisions ==
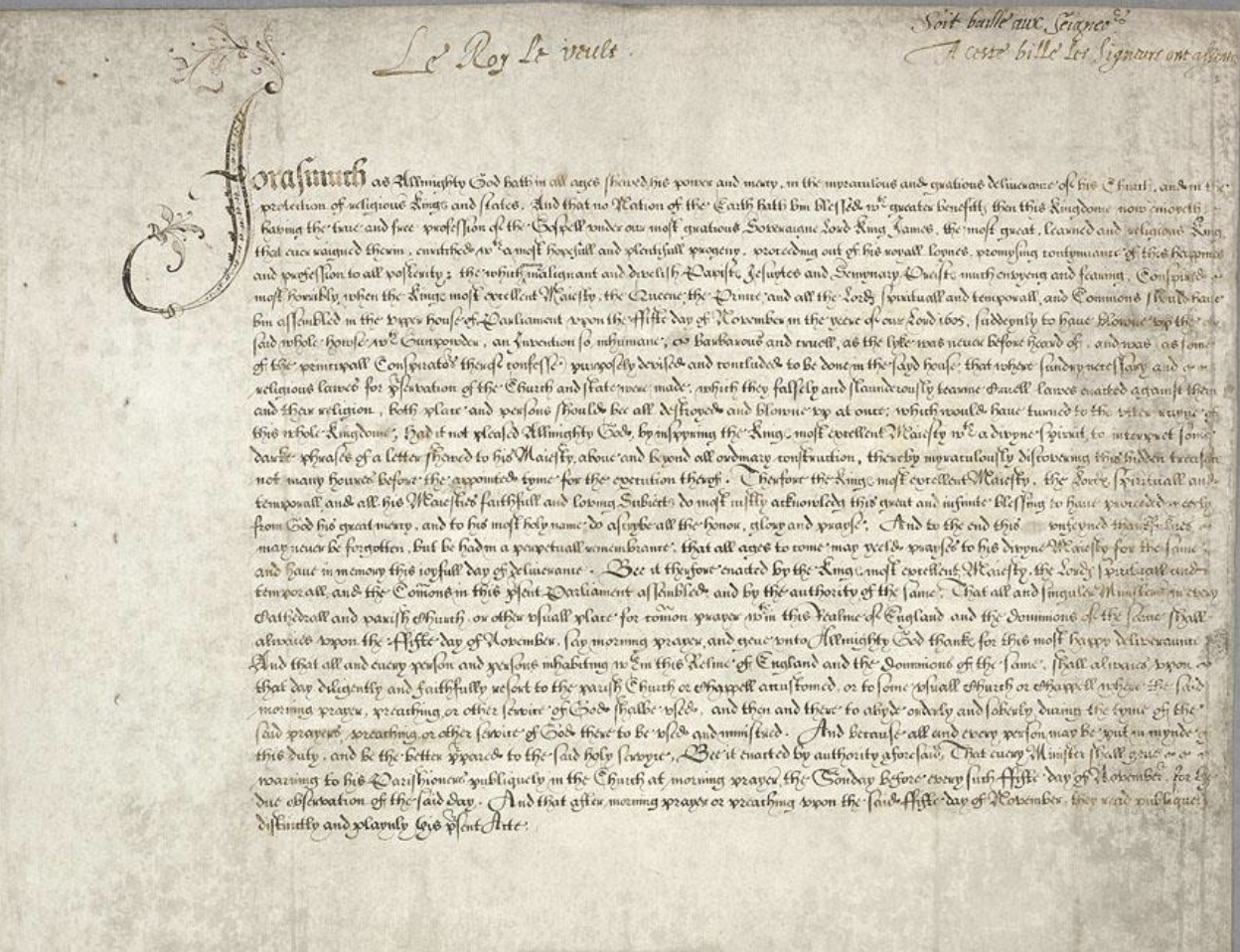
Original text

The act required that all "Ministers in every Cathedral and Parish Church, or other usual Place for Common Prayer … shall always upon the fifth Day of November say Morning Prayer, and give unto Almighty God Thanks for this most happy Deliverance". During the service the minister had to "publickly, distinctly and plainly" read out the text of the act.

It further required all persons to "diligently and faithfully resort to the Parish Church or Chapel accustomed" on 5 November and "to abide orderly and soberly during the Time of said Prayers, Preaching or other Services of God."

Every minister was required to give warning to his parishioners publicly in the church at morning prayer on the Sunday beforehand.

The act prescribed no penalties or other consequences should its requirements be breached.

== Influence ==
The act was one of the first examples of legislative commemoration, serving as a template for similar legislation requiring commemoration of the Virginian massacre (1622), the Irish Rebellion (1641), the execution of Charles I (1649), and the Stuart Restoration (1660) on Royal Oak Apple Day.

== Subsequent developments ==
The whole act was repealed for England and Wales by section 1 of, and the schedule to, the Anniversary Days Observance Act 1859 (22 Vict. c. 2), which came into force on 25 March 1859.

The whole act was repealed for the Isle of Man by section 1(2) of, and schedule 2 to, the Statute Law Revision (Isle of Man) Act 1991, which came into force on 25 July 1991.

== See also ==
- Guy Fawkes Night
- Guy Fawkes

== Bibliography ==
- Anon (1859). The law journal for the year 1832–1949. Vol. XXXVII. E. B. Ince.
- Cressy, David (1992). "The Fifth of November Remembered". In Roy Porter (ed.). Myths of the English. Cambridge: Polity Press. ISBN 0-7456-0844-2.
