= Oath of Allegiance, etc. Act 1609 =

Act of the Parliament of England

- Act of Parliament
- Parliament of England
- Long title: An Act for administring the oath of allegiance, and reformation of married women recusants.
- Citation: 7 Jas. 1. c. 6
- Territorial extent: England and Wales

Dates
- Royal assent: 23 July 1610
- Commencement: 9 February 1610 (Note: Start of session.)
- Repealed: 18 August 1846
Other legislation
Repealed by	Religious Disabilities Act 1846
Relates to	Popish Recusants Act 1605

Status: Repealed

Text of statute as originally enacted

The Oath of Allegiance, etc. Act 1609 (7 Jas. 1. c. 6) was an act of the Parliament of England passed during the reign of James I. The act ordered officers, ecclesiastical persons, Members of Parliament, lawyers and others to take the oath of allegiance or otherwise they would suffer penalties and disabilities. The act also declared that no MP could enter the House of Commons without first taking the oath before the Lord Steward or his deputy.

== Subsequent developments ==
So much of the act as relates to recusants or to the penalties of recusancy was repealed by section 1 of the Roman Catholics Act 1844 (7 & 8 Vict. c. 102).

The whole act was repealed by section 1 of the Religious Disabilities Act 1846 (9 & 10 Vict. c. 59).
