= Statute Law (Repeals) Act 1969 =

Act of the Parliament of the United Kingdom

Statute Law (Repeals) Act 1969 (Note: Section 7(1).)
- Act of Parliament
- Parliament of the United Kingdom
- Long title: An Act to promote the reform of the statute law by the repeal, in accordance with recommendations of the Law Commission, of certain enactments which (except in so far as their effect is preserved) are no longer of practical utility, and by making other provision in connection with the repeal of those enactments.
- Citation: 1969 c. 52
- Territorial extent: United Kingdom; Channel Islands; Isle of Man; (Note: Sections 5 and 6.)

Dates
- Royal assent: 22 October 1969
- Commencement: 1 January 1970 (Note: Section 7(2).)

Other legislation
- Amends: See § Repealed enactments
- Repeals/revokes: See § Repealed enactments
- Amended by: Northern Ireland Constitution Act 1973; Church of England (Worship and Doctrine) Measure 1974; Statute Law (Repeals) Act 1998
- Relates to: Wild Creatures and Forest Laws Act 1971; See Statute Law (Repeals) Act

Status: Amended

Text of statute as originally enacted

Revised text of statute as amended

Text of the Statute Law (Repeals) Act 1969 as in force today (including any amendments) within the United Kingdom, from legislation.gov.uk.

The Statute Law (Repeals) Act 1969 (c. 52) is an act of the Parliament of the United Kingdom.

== Background ==
The act implemented recommendations contained in the first report on statute law revision made by the Law Commission. Several proposals initial considered required a provision abolishing the forest law and the royal prerogative right to wild creatures, which led to their exclusion and the passage of the Wild Creatures and Forest Laws Act 1971 as a law reform act.

During the passage of the bill, the Joint Committee on Consolidation Bills spent 6 days reviewing the proposals.

== Provisions ==
Section 2 of the act amended the Statute of Westminster 1285 (13 Edw. 1. St. 1) to clarify the proceedings of Advowsons in case of Quare impedit.

Section 3 of the act defined the owner's rights for rent charges that survive the repeal of the Copyhold Act 1894 (57 & 58 Vict. c. 46).

Section 4 of the act lists specific provisions that survive the repeals of the Sunday Fairs Act 1448, the Clergy Act 1533, the Appointment of Bishops Act 1533, the Ecclesiastical Licences Act 1533, the Suffragan Bishops Act 1534, and selected sections of the Act of Supremacy.

Section 5 of the act provided that sections and schedules which do not apply to Northern Ireland unless confirmed by its Parliament, and which sections of Irish Church Act 1869 (32 & 33 Vict. c. 42) should survive the repeals.

Section 6 of the act provided that only the repeal of Societies (Miscellaneous Provisions) Act 1940 (3 & 4 Geo. 6. c. 19) applies to Channel Islands and Isle of Man.

=== Repealed enactments ===
Section 1 of the act repealed 187 enactments, listed in parts I to IX of the schedule to the act.

==== Part I: Constitutional Enactments ====
Part I — Constitutional Enactments
Citation	Short title	Description	Extent of repeal
25 Edw. 1	Magna Carta	(Confirmation of Magna Carta).	The whole statute, so far as unrepealed, except articles 1, 9, 29 and 37.
25 Edw. 1	Confirmatio Cartarum	(Confirmation of the Charters).	The whole statute except chapters 1 and 6.
25 Edw. 1	Statutum de Tallagio	A Statute concerning Tallage.	The whole statute except chapter 1.
28 Edw. 1	Articuli super Cartas	Articles upon the Charters.	The whole statute, so far as unrepealed.
1 Edw. 3. Stat. 2	N/A	(Borough liberties).	Chapter 9.
2 Edw. 3	Statute of Northampton	Statute of Northampton.	Chapter 8.
5 Edw. 3	N/A	(Unlawful attachment).	Chapter 9.
14 Edw. 3. Stat. 1	N/A	(Confirmation of liberties).	Chapter 1.
1 Mar. Sess. 3. c. 1	Queen Regent's Prerogative Act 1554	The Queen Regent's Prerogative Act 1554.	The whole act.
5 Eliz. 1. c. 18	Lord Keeper Act 1562	The Lord Keeper Act 1562.	The whole act.
16 Cha. 1. c. 14	Ship Money Act 1640	The Ship Money Act 1640.	The whole act, so far as unrepealed.
12 Cha. 2. c. 1	Parliament Act 1660	The Parliament Act 1660.	The whole act.
12 Cha. 2. c. 30	Attainder of the Regicides, etc. Act 1660	An Act for the attainder of several persons guilty of the horrid murder of His late sacred Majesty King Charles the First.	The whole act, so far as unrepealed.
13 Cha. 2. St. 1. c. 6	The King's Sole Right over the Militia Act 1661	An Act declaring the sole right of the Militia to be in the King and for the present ordering and disposing of the same.	The preamble, so far as unrepealed.

==== Part II: Ecclesiastical Enactments ====
Part II — Ecclesiastical Enactments
Citation	Short title	Description	Extent of repeal
13 Edw. 1	Statute of Westminster 1285	(Statute of Westminster, the Second).	Chapter 5.
13 Edw. 1	Statute of Winchester	(Statute of Winchester).	Chapter 6.
9 Edw. 2. Stat. 1	Articuli Cleri	Articles for the Clergy.	The whole statute, so far as unrepealed.
Of uncertain date	N/A	Of the King's Prerogative.	Chapter 10.
25 Edw. 3. Stat. 6	An Ordinance for the Clergy	An Ordinance for the Clergy.	The whole statute, so far as unrepealed.
13 Ric. 2. Stat. 1	N/A	(Royal presentations to benefices).	Chapter 1, so far as unrepealed.
15 Ric. 2	N/A	(Appropriation of benefices).	Chapter 6, so far as unrepealed.
4 Hen. 4	Enforcement of 15 Ric. 2 c. 6 Act 1402	(Appropriation of benefices).	Chapter 12, so far as unrepealed.
8 Hen. 6. c. 1	Privileges of Clergy Act 1492	(Convocation to have privilege of Parliament).	The whole chapter, so far as unrepealed.
23 Hen. 8. c. 20	Payment of Annates Act 1531	An Act concerning restraint of payment of annates to the See of Rome.	The whole act, so far as unrepealed.
24 Hen. 8. c. 12	Ecclesiastical Appeals Act 1532	The Ecclesiastical Appeals Act 1532.	The whole act, so far as unrepealed.
25 Hen. 8. c. 19	Submission of the Clergy Act 1533	The Submission of the Clergy Act 1533.	The whole act, so far as unrepealed, except sections 1 and 3.
25 Hen. 8. c. 20	Appointment of Bishops Act 1533	The Appointment of Bishops Act 1533.	The preamble and sections 1 and 2.
25 Hen. 8. c. 21	Ecclesiastical Licences Act 1533	The Ecclesiastical Licences Act 1533.	The preamble and sections 1, 2, 15, 21 and 23.
27 Hen. 8. c. 28	Suppression of Religious Houses Act 1535	The Suppression of Religious Houses Act 1535.	The whole act, so far as unrepealed.
28 Hen. 8. c. 16	Ecclesiastical Licences Act 1536	The Ecclesiastical Licences Act 1536.	The whole act, so far as unrepealed.
31 Hen. 8. c. 13	Suppression of Religious Houses Act 1539	The Suppression of Religious Houses Act 1539.	The whole act, except section 19.
32 Hen. 8. c. 7	Tithe Act 1540	The Tithe Act 1540.	Section 5, so far as unrepealed.
32 Hen. 8. c. 20	Suppression of Monasteries Act 1540	The Liberties to be used.	The whole act.
37 Hen. 8. c. 4	Dissolution of Colleges Act 1545	The Dissolution of Colleges Act 1545.	The whole act, so far as unrepealed.
1 Edw. 6. c. 1	Sacrament Act 1547	The Sacrament Act 1547.	The whole act, so far as unrepealed, except section 8.
2 & 3 Edw. 6. c. 1	Act of Uniformity 1548	The Act of Uniformity 1548.	The whole act, so far as unrepealed, except section 7.
2 & 3 Edw. 6. c. 21	Clergy Marriage Act 1548	The Clergy Marriage Act 1548.	The whole act, so far as unrepealed.
5 & 6 Edw. 6. c. 1	Act of Uniformity 1551	The Act of Uniformity 1551.	The whole act, so far as unrepealed.
5 & 6 Edw. 6. c. 3	Holy Days and Fasting Days Act 1551	The Holy Days and Fasting Days Act 1551.	The whole act, so far as unrepealed.
5 & 6 Edw. 6. c. 12	Clergy Marriage Act 1551	The Clergy Marriage Act 1551.	The whole act, so far as unrepealed.
1 Eliz. 1. c. 1	Act of Supremacy 1558	The Act of Supremacy.	The whole act, so far as unrepealed, except section 8.
1 Eliz. 1. c. 2	Act of Uniformity 1558	The Act of Uniformity 1558.	The whole act, so far as unrepealed, except section 13.
13 Eliz. 1. c. 2	Bulls, etc., from Rome Act 1571	An Act against the bringing in and putting in execution of bulls and other instruments from the See of Rome.	The whole act, so far as unrepealed.
13 Eliz. 1. c. 12	Ordination of Ministers Act 1571	The Ordination of Ministers Act 1571.	The whole act, so far as unrepealed.
35 Eliz. 1. c. 3	Confirmation of Grants (Explanation) Act 1592	An Act explaining the Statute of 34 Hen. 8. touching grants.	The whole act.
13 Cha. 2. St. 1. c. 12	Ecclesiastical Jurisdiction Act 1661	The Ecclesiastical Jurisdiction Act 1661.	The whole act, so far as unrepealed.
14 Cha. 2. c. 4	Act of Uniformity 1662	The Act of Uniformity 1662.	The following provisions, so far as unrepealed:— Sections 2 and 3. In section 10 the words from " upon pain " onwards. Section 17. In section 20 the words " and statutes of this realm " and the words "have beene formerly made and ".
15 Cha. 2. c. 6	Act of Uniformity (Explanation) Act 1663	The Act of Uniformity (Explanation) Act 1663.	The whole act, so far as unrepealed.
1 Will. & Mar. c. 18 (Note: This is the citation in The Statutes of the Realm.)	Toleration Act 1688	The Toleration Act 1688.	The whole act, so far as unrepealed.
7 & 8 Will. 3. c. 34	Quakers Act 1695	An Act that the solemn affirmation and declaration of the people called Quakers shall be accepted instead of an oath in the usual form.	The whole act, so far as unrepealed.
7 Ann. c. 18	Advowsons Act 1708	The Advowsons Act 1708.	The whole act.
1 Geo. 1. St. 2. c. 6	Tithes and Church Rates Recovery Act 1714	The Tithes and Church Rates Recovery Act 1714.	The whole act, so far as unrepealed.
19 Geo. 3. c. 44	Nonconformist Relief Act 1779	The Nonconformist Relief Act 1779.	The whole act, so far as unrepealed.
9 & 10 Vict. c. 59	Religious Disabilities Act 1846	The Religious Disabilities Act 1846.	Section 1, so far as unrepealed.
23 & 24 Vict. c. 32	Ecclesiastical Courts Jurisdiction Act 1860	The Ecclesiastical Courts Jurisdiction Act 1860.	Section 6.
26 & 27 Vict. c. 120	Lord Chancellor's Augmentation Act 1863	The Lord Chancellor's Augmentation Act.	The whole act.

==== Part III: Law of Property Enactments ====
Part III — Law of Property Enactments
Citation	Short title	Extent of repeal
32 Hen. 8. c. 37	Cestui que vie Act 1540	The whole act, so far as unrepealed.
32 Hen. 8. c. 51	Queen Consort Act 1540	The whole act, so far as unrepealed.
34 & 35 Hen. 8. c. 20	Feigned Recoveries Act 1542	The whole act, so far as unrepealed.
12 Cha. 2. c. 24	Tenures Abolition Act 1660	The whole act, so far as unrepealed, except sections 4 and 9.
3 & 4 Will. 4. c. 74	Fines and Recoveries Act 1833	In section 27 the words from " (except " to " thirty-three) ". In section 40 the words from " and if " onwards. In section 58 the words " except so far as the same may be varied by the clause next hereinafter contained." Section 71 from " and all the previous clauses in this Act" onwards. In section 72 the words from " but every deed to be executed " to " Ireland ", where next occurring. Sections 77 and 78. Section 91.
7 Will. 4 & 1 Vict. c. 26	Wills Act 1837	In section 1, in the definition of " will " the words from " by virtue of an Act", where first occurring to " knights service" where last occurring; and in the definition of " real estate " the words from " whether freehold" to " tenure, and ". In section 3 the words from " upon the heir" to "ancestor or"; and the words from " to all real estate " to " hereditament; and also ". Sections 4 to 6. Section 8. In section 26 the words " customary, copyhold or " and the words " customary, copyhold and" in both places.
5 & 6 Vict. c. 94	Defence Act 1842	Section 8. In section 10, the words " feoffees or ", the words from " tenants for life " to " curators or ", the words from " femes covert" to " idiots or", the word " surrender", the words " enfranchisements, surrenders " and the words from " and shall be a complete bar " onwards. In sections 12, 13 and 14 the word " surrender " where-ever occurring, and in section 14 the word " surrendered ". In section 15 the words from " or being femes covert" to " for that purpose ", and the word " discovert". In section 18 the words " feoffees or ", the words from " tenants for life " to " curators or ", the words from " femes covert" to " idiots or", the word " surrender " and the word " surrenders ". In section 25 the words " enfranchisement of any copyhold or ".
9 & 10 Vict. c. 70	Inclosure Act 1846	Section 6, except the words " such Assistant Commissioner shall frame a draft award", and the words from " with a map or plan annexed thereto" to " under their seal ". Section 7. In section 8 the words from " and any such authority " to " may require " where next occurring, the words " shall insert a declaration in his draft award or " , and the words " as the case may require ". Section 9. In section 10 the words " authorised to take surrenders or grant admittance of or to copyhold or customary lands in such manor ".
12 & 13 Vict. c. 49	School Sites Act 1849	Section 6.
17 & 18 Vict. c. 112	Literary and Scientific Institutions Act 1854	Section 15.
20 & 21 Vict. c. 57	Married Women's Reversionary Interests Act 1857	The whole act, so far as unrepealed.
22 & 23 Vict. c. 35	Law of Property Amendment Act 1859	Section 25.
45 & 46 Vict. c. 75	Married Women's Property Act 1882	Sections 6 to 9. In section 11 the words from " If at the time of the death of the insured" to "the same ". Section 13. In section 17 the words from " or any such bank" to " are standing ", and the final proviso. Sections 18 and 19. In section 24 the words from the beginning to " administration ". Section 25.
57 & 58 Vict. c. 46	Copyhold Act 1894	The whole act.
59 & 60 Vict. c. 25	Friendly Societies Act 1896	Section 48.
7 Edw. 7. c. 18	Married Women's Property Act 1907	Section 2.
4 & 5 Geo. 5. c. 59	Bankruptcy Act 1914	Section 55(5), so far as it relates to any provision repealed by this Act in the Fines and Recoveries Act 1833.
12 & 13 Geo. 5. c. 16	Law of Property Act 1922	Section 43(4) to (7). Sections 128 to 136. Sections 138 to 143. In section 188, paragraphs (2) to (5), (7), (8), (10) to (18), (20) to (22) and (24) to (29); paragraph (30) from "trustees for sale" onwards; and paragraph (32). Section 189. Schedules 12 to 14.
15 & 16 Geo. 5. c. 5	Law of Property (Amendment) Act 1924	In Schedule 2, paragraphs 3 and 4. In Schedule 9, paragraph 6 in columns 1 and 2.
15 & 16 Geo. 5. c. 18	Settled Land Act 1925	Section 38(ii). In section 58(1) the words " manorial incidents ". Section 62(1) to (3). In section 64(2) the words "extinguishment of manorial incidents ". In section 71(1) paragraphs (iv) and (v). In section 73(1) paragraphs (vi) and (vii).
15 & 16 Geo. 5. c. 20	Law of Property Act 1925	Section 133. Sections 167 to 170. Section 178.
15 & 16 Geo. 5. c. 24	Universities and College Estates Act 1925	In section 2(1), paragraph (ii). In section 26(1), paragraphs (v) and (vi).
15 & 16 Geo. 5. c. 76	Expiring Laws Act 1925	In Schedule 1, the entry relating to 34 & 35 Hen. 8. c. 20.
16 & 17 Geo. 5. c. 11	Law of Property (Amendment) Act 1926	In the Schedule, so much of the entry relating to the Law of Property Act 1922 as amends Schedule 13.
25 & 26 Geo. 5. c. 30	Law Reform (Married Women and Tortfeasors) Act 1935	Schedule 1 except so far as it amends section 11 of the Married Women's Property Act 1882.
3 & 4 Geo. 6. c. 2	Postponement of Enactments (Miscellaneous Provisions) Act 1939	The whole act, so far as unrepealed.
11 & 12 Geo. 6. c. 38	Companies Act 1948	Section 217. In section 401(2) the words " or marriage of any female contributory" and the words " and to the liabilities of husbands and wives".
11 & 12 Geo. 6. c. 63	Agricultural Holdings Act 1948	Section 85.
12, 13 & 14 Geo. 6. c. 78	Married Women (Restraint upon Anticipation) Act 1949	Section 1(3). Schedule 1.
5 & 6 Eliz. 2. c. 27	Solicitors Act 1957	Section 74(b).
7 & 8 Eliz. 2. c. 22	County Courts Act 1959	In Schedule 1, the entry relating to the Law of Property Act 1922, and in the entry relating to the Law of Property Act 1925, the words " one hundred and sixty-nine " in column 1.
7 & 8 Eliz. 2. c. 72	Mental Health Act 1959	In Schedule 5 the entries relating to the Defence Act 1842 and the Copyhold Act 1894. In Schedule 7, in the entry relating to the Fines and Recoveries Act 1833, the words from "In section ninety-one " onwards.
8 & 9 Eliz. 2. c. 58	Charities Act 1960	In Schedule 6, the entry relating to the Copyhold Act 1894.

==== Part IV: Enactments relating to Sunday Observance ====
Part IV — Enactments relating to Sunday Observance
Citation	Short title	Description	Extent of repeal
27 Hen. 6. c. 5	Sunday Fairs Act 1448	The Sunday Fairs Act 1448.	The whole chapter.
1 Cha. 1. c. 1	Sunday Observance Act 1625	The Sunday Observance Act 1625.	The whole act, so far as unrepealed.
3 Cha. 1. c. 2	Sunday Observance Act 1627	An Act for the further reformation of sundry abuses committed on the Lord's Day commonly called Sunday.	The whole act, so far as unrepealed.
29 Cha. 2. c. 7	Sunday Observance Act 1677	The Sunday Observance Act 1677.	The whole act, so far as unrepealed.
34 & 35 Vict. c. 87	Sunday Observation Prosecution Act 1871	The Sunday Observation Prosecution Act 1871.	The whole act, so far as unrepealed.
12 & 13 Geo. 5. c. 50	Expiring Laws Act 1922	The Expiring Laws Act 1922.	In Schedule 1, the entry relating to the Sunday Observation Prosecution Act 1871.
14 Geo. 6. c. 28	Shops Act 1950	The Shops Act 1950.	Section 59(2).
2 & 3 Eliz. 2. c. 57	Baking Industry (Hours of Work) Act 1954	The Baking Industry (Hours of Work) Act 1954.	Section 12(1).
6 & 7 Eliz. 2. c. 65	Children Act 1958	The Children Act 1958.	In section 7(2), the words " notwithstanding anything in section six of the Sunday Observance Act 1677 ".
7 & 8 Eliz. 2. c. 5	Adoption Act 1958	The Adoption Act 1958.	In section 43(2), the words " notwithstanding anything in section six of the Sunday Observance Act 1677 ".

==== Part V: Hallmarking Enactments ====
Part V — Hallmarking Enactments
Citation	Short title	Description	Extent of repeal
18 Eliz. 1. c. 15	Marking Plate Act 1575	An Act for Reformation of Abuses in Goldsmiths.	The whole act, so far as unrepealed.
8 & 9 Will. 3. c. 8	Standard of Silver Plate, etc. Act 1696	An Act for encouraging the bringing in wrought plate to be coined.	In section 8, the words from " and if any silversmith, goldsmith or other person " onwards.
1 Ann. c. 3	Assay of Plate Act 1702	(Assay of plate).	Sections 3 and 5.
12 Geo. 2. c. 26	Plate (Offences) Act 1738	The Plate (Offences) Act 1738.	In section 11 the words from " or to and for any warden " to " Newcastle-upon-Tyne "; the words " such warden, deputy warden or assayer", and the words " or assayers ". Section 18. In section 20 the words from " or any assayer at York " to " Newcastle - upon -Tyne,"; and the words " or any warden of the company at any of the cities or places aforesaid ". In section 21 the words from " or in the assay office at York" to " Newcastle-upon-Tyne,".
38 Geo. 3. c. 69	Gold Plate (Standard) Act 1798	The Gold Plate (Standard) Act 1798.	In section 3 the words from " and the wardens and assayer" to " Newcastle upon Tyne ".
7 & 8 Vict. c. 22	Gold and Silver Wares Act 1844	The Gold and Silver Wares Act 1844.	In section 7 the words from " or any of the several companies" to "Newcastle-upon-Tyne,". In section 15 the words from " and by the several companies " to " Newcastle-upon-Tyne,".

==== Part VI: Enactments relating to the Commonwealth ====
Part VI — Enactments relating to the Commonwealth
Citation	Short title	Extent of repeal
24 & 25 Geo. 5. c. 2	Newfoundland Act 1933	Section 3.
11 & 12 Geo. 6. c. 7	Ceylon Independence Act 1947	In section 4, in subsection (1) the words from " and His Majesty " to " section one of this Act"; and subsections (3) and (4).
11 & 12 Geo. 6. c. 8	Mandated and Trust Territories Act 1947	In section 1, in subsection (1) the words " Subject to subsection (2) of this section"; subsection (2); in subsection (5) the words " and an Order in Council thereunder may modify"; and subsection (6).
12, 13 & 14 Geo. 6. c. 22	British North America Act 1949	Section 2.
14 Geo. 6. c. 5	Newfoundland (Consequential Provisions) Act 1950	Sections 1 and 3. The Schedule.
4 & 5 Eliz. 2. c. 31	Pakistan (Consequential Provision) Act 1956	In section 1, in subsection (1) the words " and subject to the provisions of subsection (3) of this section"; and subsection (3).
5 & 6 Eliz. 2. c. 6	Ghana Independence Act 1957	In section 4(4), the words from " and Her Majesty " to " that day ".
6 & 7 Eliz. 2. c. 45	Prevention of Fraud (Investments) Act 1958	In section 28(7), the words " subsection (3) of section one of the Pakistan (Consequential Provision) Act 1956 ".
8 & 9 Eliz. 2. c. 55	Nigeria Independence Act 1960	In section 3(4), the words from " and Her Majesty " to " that day ".
9 & 10 Eliz. 2. c. 16	Sierra Leone Independence Act 1961	In section 3(3), the words from " and Her Majesty " to " that day ".
10 & 11 Eliz. 2. c. 1	Tanganyika Independence Act 1961	In section 3(4), the words from " and Her Majesty " to " that day ".
10 & 11 Eliz. 2. c. 40	Jamaica Independence Act 1962	In section 3(5), the words from " and Her Majesty " onwards.
10 & 11 Eliz. 2. c. 54	Trinidad and Tobago Independence Act 1962	In section 3(4), the words from " and Her Majesty " onwards.
10 & 11 Eliz. 2. c. 57	Uganda Independence Act 1962	In section 3(4), the words from " and Her Majesty " onwards.
11 & 12 Eliz. 2. c. 1	Tanganyika Republic Act 1962	In section 1, in subsection (1) the words " and subject to the following provisions of this section"; and subsections (2) and (3).
1963 c. 54	Kenya Independence Act 1963	In section 4, in subsection (4) the words from " and Her Majesty" onwards; and in subsection (5) the words " and any Order in Council made under the said subsection (4)".
1963 c. 55	Zanzibar Act 1963	Section 4. In section 5(1) and (2) the words " or section 4 ".
1963 c. 57	Nigeria Republic Act 1963	In section 2, subsection (1); in subsection (2) the words "Any Order in Council made under subsection (1) of this section, and "; and subsection (3).
1964 c. 20	Uganda Act 1964	In section 2, subsection (1); in subsection (2) the words "Any Order in Council made under subsection (1) of this section, and "; and subsection (3).
1964 c. 46	Malawi Independence Act 1964	In section 4, in subsection (4) the words from " and Her Majesty" onwards; subsection (5); and in subsection (6) the words " and any Order in Council made under the said subsection (4)".
1964 c. 65	Zambia Independence Act 1964	Section 9. In section 10(1) and (2), the words " or section 9 ".
1964 c. 86	Malta Independence Act 1964	In section 4, in subsection (4) the words from " and Her Majesty" onwards; subsection (5); and subsection (7) except the words "Schedule 2 to this Act and subsection (4) of this section shall not extend to Malta as part of its law ".
1964 c. 93	Gambia Independence Act 1964	In section 4, in subsection (4) the words from " and Her Majesty" onwards; subsection (5); and subsection (6) except the words "Schedule 2 to this Act and subsection (4) of this section shall not extend to The Gambia as part of its law ".
1965 c. 5	Kenya Republic Act 1965	In section 2, subsection (1); in subsection (2) the words "Any Order in Council made under subsection (1) of this section, and "; and subsection (3).
1966 c. 29	Singapore Act 1966	In section 4, subsection (1); in subsection (2) the words "An Order in Council under this section and"; and subsection (3).

==== Part VII: Miscellaneous Enactments ====
Part VII — Miscellaneous Enactments
Citation	Short title	Description	Extent of repeal
3 Edw. 1	Statute of Westminster 1275	(Statute of Westminster, the First).	Chapter 16.
13 Edw. 1	Statute of Westminster 1285	(Statute of Westminster, the Second).	Chapters 37 and 42.
2 Edw. 3	Statute of Northampton	Statute of Northampton.	Chapter 15.
7 Hen. 4	Sales in Gross (London) Act 1405	(Sales by wholesale in City of London).	Chapter 9.
18 Hen. 6. c. 1	Dating of Letters Patent Act 1439	(Date of letters patent).	The whole chapter.
28 Hen. 8. c. 5	Apprentices Act 1536	The Apprentices Act 1536.	The whole act, so far as unrepealed.
1 & 2 Phil. & Mar. c. 12	Distress Act 1554	The Distress Act 1554.	The whole act, so far as unrepealed.
7 Jas. 1. c. 12	Shop-books Evidence Act 1609	The Shop-books Evidence Act 1609.	The whole act, so far as unrepealed.
7 Jas. 1. c. 15	Crown Debts Act 1609	The Crown Debts Act 1609.	The whole act, so far as unrepealed.
21 Jas. 1. c. 3	Statute of Monopolies	The Statute of Monopolies.	In the preamble, the words from " and of the benefitt" to " the forfeiture ". In section 1, the words from " or to give licence" to " the same or any of them,". Sections 2 to 4.
29 Cha. 2. c. 3	Statute of Frauds	The Statute of Frauds.	Section 22.
5 Will. & Mar. c. 6	Royal Mines Act 1693	The Royal Mines Act 1693.	Section 2.
55 Geo. 3. c. 134	Crown Pre-emption of Lead Ore Act 1815	The Crown Pre-emption of Lead Ore Act 1815.	The whole act, so far as unrepealed.
6 Geo. 4. c. 97	Universities Act 1825	The Universities Act 1825.	In section 3, the words " and night walker ".
5 & 6 Will. 4. c. 24	Naval Enlistment Act 1835	The Naval Enlistment Act 1835.	The whole act, so far as unrepealed.
1 & 2 Vict. c. 43	Dean Forest (Mines) Act 1838	The Dean Forest (Mines) Act 1838.	The preamble. Sections 1 to 13. Section 16 from "and a list" onwards. In section 17 the words " to the said Commissioners hereby appointed ". Section 18. Section 19 from the beginning to the words " London Gazette, then ". In section 20 the words " by the said Commissioners or". In section 22 the words from "or from" to "Buildings ". Sections 24 to 26. Section 27 from the beginning to the words "the passing of this Act and" in the proviso; the words from " for the term ", where first occurring in the proviso to " paid to Her Majesty, Her Heirs and Successors" except the words " and the yearly rent"; the words " respectively as aforesaid"; and the words "to Her Majesty" wherever afterwards occurring. Section 28. Sections 30 to 44. Sections 50 and 51. In section 53 the words from the beginning to " successors, and " except the words " it shall be lawful for the said gaveller"; and the words from " the said commissioners", in the second place where they occur to " their agents" except the words " the gaveller ". Section 55. In section 56 the words from " with the previous approbation and allowance" to " under their hands and seals"; and the first proviso. Section 57 from " and the gaveller " onwards. In section 60 the words from " and when" to " direct". Section 63. In section 65, in the first proviso the words "and enrolled in the office of land revenue records and enrolments ". Section 66. In section 68 the words from "by the said Commissioners hereby appointed" to " determined " where next occurring; the words from "after the time limited" to " ten days ", where next occurring; and the proviso from " and that for the purposes of this Act" onwards. Sections 70 to 82. Section 83 from the beginning to " provided nevertheless, that". Sections 84 to 89. Section 91.
3 & 4 Vict. c. 65	Admiralty Court Act 1840	The Admiralty Court Act 1840.	The whole act, so far as unrepealed.
5 & 6 Vict. c. 83	St. Briavels Small Debts Court Act 1842	An Act to abolish the court of Saint Briavel's, and for the more easy and speedy recovery of small debts within the hundred of Saint Briavel's in the county of Gloucester.	The whole act, so far as unrepealed.
16 & 17 Vict. c. 69	Naval Enlistment Act 1853	The Naval Enlistment Act 1853.	The whole act, so far as unrepealed.
16 & 17 Vict. c. 107	Customs Consolidation Act 1853	The Customs Consolidation Act 1853.	Sections 332 and 333, 335 to 341 and 343 to 345.
24 & 25 Vict. c. 40	Dean Forest Act 1861	An Act to make further provision for the management of Her Majesty's Forest of Dean, and of the mines and quarries therein and in the hundred of Saint Briavel's in the county of Gloucester.	The preamble. Section 2. Sections 5 and 6. Section 17. Section 22. Section 27.
34 & 35 Vict. c. 85	Dean Forest (Mines) Act 1871	The Dean Forest (Mines) Act 1871.	The preamble. Section 2 except in so far as it defines " principal Acts ". Sections 5 to 32 (but without prejudice to the award thereunder).
37 & 38 Vict. c. 42	Building Societies Act 1874	The Building Societies Act 1874.	Section 7.
39 & 40 Vict. c. 36	Customs Consolidation Act 1876	The Customs Consolidation Act 1876.	Section 275, so far as unrepealed.
40 & 41 Vict. c. 40	Writs Execution (Scotland) Act 1877	The Writs Execution (Scotland) Act 1877.	Section 4.
42 & 43 Vict. c. 36	Customs Buildings Act 1879	The Customs Buildings Act 1879.	Section 4 and, so far as unrepealed, section 6.
42 & 43 Vict. c. 44	Lord Clerk Register (Scotland) Act 1879	The Lord Clerk Register (Scotland) Act 1879.	Section 4.
45 & 46 Vict. c. 17	Customs and Inland Revenue Buildings (Ireland) Act 1882	The Customs and Inland Revenue Buildings (Ireland) Act 1882.	Sections 3 and 5.
58 & 59 Vict. c. 19	Court of Session Consignations (Scotland) Act 1895	The Court of Session Consignations (Scotland) Act 1895.	In section 2, the words " or by any of the clerks of court, as the case may be ". In section 3, from the beginning to the words " provided that" and the words from " and the Clerk " to " such clerk ". In section 16, the words " or any of the Clerks of Court". Section 17.
59 & 60 Vict. c. 19	Public Health Act 1896	The Public Health Act 1896.	The whole act, so far as unrepealed.
60 & 61 Vict. c. 24	Finance Act 1897	The Finance Act 1897.	The whole act, so far as unrepealed.
4 Edw. 7. c. 7	Finance Act 1904	The Finance Act 1904.	The whole act, so far as unrepealed.
4 Edw. 7. c. 16	Public Health Act 1904	The Public Health Act 1904.	The whole act, so far as unrepealed.
4 Edw. 7. c. clvi	Dean Forest (Mines) Act 1904	The Dean Forest (Mines) Act 1904.	Section 5. Section 7(3). Section 8.
9 & 10 Geo. 5. c. 82	Irish Land (Provision for Sailors and Soldiers) Act 1919	The Irish Land (Provision for Sailors and Soldiers) Act 1919.	Section 2.
10 & 11 Geo. 5. c. 18	Finance Act 1920	The Finance Act 1920.	Section 57, so far as unrepealed.
15 & 16 Geo. 5. c. 36	Finance Act 1925	The Finance Act 1925.	Section 5(4).
15 & 16 Geo. 5. c. 88	Coastguard Act 1925	The Coastguard Act 1925.	Section 1(3).
17 & 18 Geo. 5. c. 18	Royal Naval Reserve Act 1927	The Royal Naval Reserve Act 1927.	Section 1(2).
19 & 20 Geo. 5. c. 21	Finance Act 1929	The Finance Act 1929.	The whole act, so far as unrepealed.
22 & 23 Geo. 5. c. 46	Children and Young Persons Act 1932	The Children and Young Persons Act 1932.	Sections 70, 77 and 87, so far as unrepealed. In section 90, the words in subsection (1) from " and the Children Acts" onwards and, in subsection (2), the words from the beginning to " except that". Schedule 2.
2 & 3 Geo. 6. c. 21	Limitation Act 1939	The Limitation Act 1939.	In section 31(2), the words from "or a convict" onwards.
3 & 4 Geo. 6. c. 19	Societies (Miscellaneous Provisions) Act 1940	The Societies (Miscellaneous Provisions) Act 1940.	The following provisions, so far as unrepealed:— Sections 1 to 7. In section 8(1), the words from " or any" to " 1928 ". In section 10(1), the definitions of " building society", "emergency ", " period of emergency", "society" and " trade union ". Section 12(3). The Schedule.
12, 13 & 14 Geo. 6. c. 47	Finance Act 1949	The Finance Act 1949.	Section 17.
14 & 15 Geo. 6. c. 39	Common Informers Act 1951	The Common Informers Act 1951.	In the Schedule, the entries relating to 2 Hen. 6. c. 17, the Apprentices Act 1536, and the Leases by Corporations Act 1541.
14 & 15 Geo. 6. c. 59	Price Control and other Orders (Indemnity) Act 1951	The Price Control and other Orders (Indemnity) Act 1951.	The whole act.
4 & 5 Eliz. 2. c. 35	Validation of Elections (Northern Ireland) Act 1956	The Validation of Elections (Northern Ireland) Act 1956.	The whole act.
6 & 7 Eliz. 2. c. 65	Children Act 1958	The Children Act 1958.	Sections 38 and 40(2). Schedule 3.
8 & 9 Eliz. 2. c. 64	Building Societies Act 1960	The Building Societies Act 1960.	Section 63. In Schedule 5, the entry relating to the Friendly Societies Act 1829.
10 & 11 Eliz. 2. c. 37	Building Societies Act 1962	The Building Societies Act 1962.	Section 125(2) and (4). Section 133(2) and (5).
1964 c. 24	Trade Union (Amalgamations, etc.) Act 1964	The Trade Union (Amalgamations, etc.) Act 1964.	Section 11(2) and (3). Schedule 3.
1967 c. 86	Countryside (Scotland) Act 1967	The Countryside (Scotland) Act 1967.	In section 11(1) the words from " In this subsection " onwards.

==== Part VIII: Acts of the Parliament of Ireland ====
Part VIII — Acts of the Parliament of Ireland
Citation	Short title	Extent of repeal
37 Hen. 6. c. 1 (I)	Warrants and Patents Act (Ireland) 1459	The whole act.
2 Eliz. 1. c. 1 (I)	Act of Supremacy (Ireland) 1560	Section 14.
4 Anne c. 12 (I)	Royal Mines Act (Ireland) 1705	Section 4.
10 Geo. 1. c. 5 (I)	Mines Act (Ireland) 1723	Section 12.

==== Part IX: Church Assembly Measures ====
Part IX — Church Assembly Measures
Citation	Short title	Extent of repeal
2 & 3 Geo. 6. No. 1	Queen Anne's Bounty (Powers) Measure 1939	In section 1, paragraph (vi).

== Subsequent developments ==
The words from "but" onwards in section 5(1), and the words from "and" onwards in section 5(2) of the act, were repealed by section 41(1)(a) of, and part I of schedule 6 to, the Northern Ireland Constitution Act 1973, which came into force on 18 July 1973.

Section 4(3) of the act was repealed by section 6(3) of, and schedule 2 to, the Church of England (Worship and Doctrine) Measure 1974 (No. 3), which came into force on 1 September 1975.

The enactments which were repealed (whether for the whole or any part of the United Kingdom) by the act were repealed so far as they extended to the Isle of Man by section 1(1) of, and schedule 1 to, the Statute Law Revision (Isle of Man) Act 1991, which came into force on 25 July 1991.

Sections 1, 2(3), the words "and so much of this Act as repeals the enactments mentioned in Parts III and IV of the Schedule." in section 5(1) and 6 of, and the schedule to, the act were repealed by section 1(1) of, and group 2 of part IX of schedule 1 to, the Statute Law (Repeals) Act 1998, which came into force on 19 November 1998.

== See also ==
- Statute Law (Repeals) Act
