= Union of England and Scotland Act 1603 =

Act of the Parliament of England

Union of Scotland and England Act 1603
- Act of Parliament
- Parliament of England
- Long title: An Act authorizing certain Commissioners of the realm of England to treat with Commissioners of Scotland, for the weal of both kingdoms.
- Citation: 1 Jas. 1. c. 2 territorial_extent = England and Wales

Dates
- Royal assent: 7 July 1604
- Commencement: 7 July 1604 (Note: Section 1. End of session.)
- Repealed: 28 July 1863

Other legislation
- Amended by: Union of Scotland and England Act 1605
- Repealed by: Statute Law Revision Act 1863
- Relates to: Acts of Union 1707

Status: Repealed

Text of statute as originally enacted

Union of England and Scotland Act 1605
- Act of Parliament
- Parliament of England
- Long title: An Act declaratorie, explayning a branche of an Acte made in the first Session of this Parliament, intituled, "An Acte authorizing certaine Comissioners of the Realme of Englande to treat with Comissioners of Scotlande for the Weale of both Kingdomes."
- Citation: 3 Jas. 1. c. 3
- Territorial extent: England and Wales

Dates
- Royal assent: 27 May 1606
- Commencement: 6 January 1606 (Note: Start of session.)
- Repealed: 28 July 1863

Other legislation
- Amends: Union of Scotland and England Act 1603
- Repealed by: Statute Law Revision Act 1863
- Relates to: Acts of Union 1707

Status: Repealed

Text of statute as originally enacted

The Union of England and Scotland Act 1603 (1 Jas. 1. c. 2) was an act of the Parliament of England enacted during the reign of King James I. It appointed a commission led by the Lord Chancellor, Lord Ellesmere, to meet and negotiate with a commission which would be appointed by the Parliament of Scotland. The aim of the discussions was to look into the possibility of arranging a formal political union between England and Scotland, going beyond the existing Union of Crowns, and to report back to Parliament. The commission was not effective, however, and similar subsequent proposals also fell flat. The two kingdoms were eventually united over a century later, by the Acts of Union 1707.

== Subsequent developments ==
Being obsolete, the whole act was repealed by section 1 of, and the schedule to, the Statute Law Revision Act 1863 (26 & 27 Vict. c. 125), which came into force on 28 July 1863.
