= Act to Restrain Abuses of Players =

1606 English censorship law

Theatre Regulation Act 1605
- Act of Parliament
- Parliament of England
- Long title: An Act to restrain Abuses of Players.
- Citation: 3 Jas. 1. c. 21
- Territorial extent: England and Wales

Dates
- Royal assent: 27 May 1606
- Commencement: 6 January 1606 (Note: Start of session.)
- Repealed: 22 August 1843
Other legislation
Repealed by	Theatres Act 1843

Status: Repealed

Text of statute as originally enacted

The Act to Restrain Abuses of Players (3 Jas. 1. c. 21) was a censorship act of the Parliament of England, which introduced fines for plays which 'jestingly or profanely' used the names of God or Jesus. Plays written after 1606 avoided such terms as a consequence of the act, and new editions of older plays removed profane words. Some scholars have argued that the Act had an important influence on the revision and publication of the plays of William Shakespeare.

== Text of act ==
An Act to restrain Abuses of Players
For the preventing and avoiding of the great Abuse of the Holy Name of God in Stage Plays, Enterludes, May Games, Shews and such like; Be it enacted by our Sovereign Lord the King's Majesty, and by the Lords Spiritual and Temporal, and the Commons, in this present Parliament assembled, and by the Authority of the same, That if at any time or times after the End of this present Session of Parliament, any Person or Persons do or shall in any Stage-play, Enterlude, Show, May-game or Pageant, jestingly or profanely speak or use the holy Name of God, or of Christ Jesus, or the Holy Ghost, or of the Trinity, which are not to be spoken but with Fear and Reverence, shall forfeit for every such Offence by him or them committed Ten Pounds; (Note: Note that when this act was passed, a pound in money was the value of a pound weight of silver.) the One Moiety thereof to the King's Majesty, his Heirs and Successors, the other Moiety thereof to him or them that will sue for the same in any Court of Record at Westminster, wherein no Essoin, Protection or Wager of Law shall be allowed.

== Impact on dramatic works ==
Many scholars and editors have argued that the act had a significant impact on English early modern drama. The need to comply with the act has been used to explain differences in editions of plays published before and after 1606, such as Othello by William Shakespeare and Volpone by Ben Jonson. However, Barbara Mowat has expressed reservations about the extent of the act's influence. She has highlighted the fact that the act only applied to dramatic performances, and thus changes to printed editions of dramatic works may have stemmed from other influences. These influences may have included changing cultural attitudes towards swearing, alterations made by particular scribes (such as Ralph Crane), and the desire to avoid offending particular individuals, such as Sir Henry Herbert, the Master of the Revels from 1624 to 1642.

== Subsequent developments ==
The whole act was repealed by section 1 of the Theatres Act 1843 (6 & 7 Vict. c. 68).

== Bibliography ==
- Gazzard, H. (2009). "An Act to Restrain Abuses of Players (1606)". The Review of English Studies. 61 (251): 495–528. doi:10.1093/res/hgp066.
- Dobson, Michael; Wells, Stanley, eds. (2001). "Act to Restrain Abuses of Players". The Oxford Companion to Shakespeare. Oxford: Oxford University Press. p. 3.
- Mowat, Barbara (2005). "Q2 Othello and the 1606 "Acte to restraine the Abuses of Players"". Varianten-Variants-Varientes. pp. 91–106. ISBN 9783110926941.
