= Bulls, etc., from Rome Act 1571 =

Act of the Parliament of England

- Act of Parliament
- Parliament of England
- Long title: An Acte agaynste the bringing in and putting in Execution of Bulls and other Instruments from the Sea of Rome.
- Citation: 13 Eliz. 1. c. 2
- Territorial extent: England and Wales

Dates
- Royal assent: 29 May 1571
- Commencement: 1 July 1571 (Note: Section 1.)
- Repealed: 1 January 1970

Other legislation
- Amended by: Repeal of Acts Concerning Importation Act 1822; Religious Disabilities Act 1846; Statute Law Revision Act 1888
- Repealed by: Statute Law Revision Act 1863; Statute Law Revision Act 1948; Criminal Law Act 1967; Statute Law (Repeals) Act 1969

Status: Repealed

Text of statute as originally enacted

The Bulls, etc., from Rome Act 1571 (13 Eliz. 1. c. 2) was an act of the Parliament of England during the English Reformation, with the long-title An Act against the bringing in and putting in execution of bulls writings or instruments and other superstitious things from the See of Rome.

The act punished with high treason those who published papal bulls and Roman Catholic priests and their converts. The act was a response to Pope Pius V's Regnans in Excelsis.

== Proceedings under the act ==
In 1911, Pope Pius X excommunicated Arnold Mathew from the Catholic Church. The Times reported on this excommunication and included an English language translation of the Latin language document which described Mathew, among other things, as a "pseudo-bishop". Mathew's attorney argued, in the 1913 trial Mathew v. "The Times" Publishing Co., Ltd., that publication of the excommunication by The Times in English was high treason under the act. The trial was, according to a 1932 article in The Tablet, the last time this principle was invoked and the judge, Charles Darling, 1st Baron Darling, "held that it was not unlawful to publish a Papal Bull in a newspaper simply for the information of the public."

== Subsequent developments ==
So much of the act "as imposes the Penalties or Punishments therein mentioned" was repealed by section 1 of the Religious Disabilities Act 1846 (9 & 10 Vict. c. 59). Although breaching the act ceased to be a crime after the passing of the act, it remained unlawful until the act was repealed.

Sections 4–6 of the act were repealed by section 1 of, and the schedule to, the Statute Law Revision Act 1863 (26 & 27 Vict. c. 125), which came into force on 28 July 1863.

Section 8 of the act was repealed by section 10(2) of, and part I of schedule 3 to, the Criminal Law Act 1967, which came into force on 1 January 1968.

The whole act so far as unrepealed was repealed by section 1 of, and part II of the schedule to, the Statute Law (Repeals) Act 1969.
