= List of acts of the Parliament of Scotland from 1700 =

This is a list of acts of the Parliament of Scotland for the years 1700 to 1707.

It lists acts of Parliament of the old Parliament of Scotland, that was merged with the old Parliament of England to form the Parliament of Great Britain, by the Union with England Act 1707 (c. 7).

For other years, see list of acts of the Parliament of Scotland. For the period after 1707, see list of acts of the Parliament of Great Britain.

== 1700 ==
The 9th session of the parliament of William II, held in Edinburgh from 29 October 1700 until 1 February 1701.

Short title, or popular name	Citation	Royal assent
Long title
Adjournment of Session Act 1700 (repealed)	1700 c. 1 (Note: This is the citation in the Record Edition.); 1700 c. 1 (Note: This is the citation in the Duodecimal Edition.)	31 October 1700
Act Adjourning the Session to the first Tuesday of December. (Repealed by Statute Law Revision (Scotland) Act 1906 (6 Edw. 7. c. 38)
Act of Security 1700 (repealed)	1700 c. 2; 1700 c. 2	23 November 1700
Act for Secureing the Protestant Religion and Presbyterian Government. (Repealed by Statute Law Revision (Scotland) Act 1906 (6 Edw. 7. c. 38))
Popery Act 1700 (repealed)	1700 c. 3; 1700 c. 3	23 November 1700
Act for Preventing the Growth of Popery. (Repealed by Statute Law Revision (Scotland) Act 1906 (6 Edw. 7. c. 38))
Adjournment of Session (No. 2) Act 1700 (repealed)	1700 c. 4; 1700 c. 4	29 November 1700
Act Adjourning the Session till the first of January. (Repealed by Statute Law Revision (Scotland) Act 1906 (6 Edw. 7. c. 38))
Adjournment of Session (No. 3) Act 1700 (repealed)	1700 c. 5; 1700 c. 5	30 December 1700
Act Adjourning the Session to the twenty eight day of January next. (Repealed by Statute Law Revision (Scotland) Act 1906 (6 Edw. 7. c. 38))

=== Sources ===
- Alexander, William (1841). "Acta Parliamentorum Guliemi et Mariæ". An Abridgement of the Acts of the Parliaments of Scotland. Edinburgh: Adam and Charles Black. p. 520 – via Google Books.
- Alexander, William (1841). "Acta Parliamentorum Guliemi et Mariæ". An Abridgement of the Acts of the Parliaments of Scotland. Edinburgh: Adam and Charles Black. p. 520 – via Google Books.
- Chronological Table of the Statutes. London: Her Majesty's Stationery Office. 1972. pp. 1366–1367 – via Google Books.
- "Index of Statutes: William II (1694-1702)". Records of the Parliaments of Scotland to 1707. University of St Andrews.

== See also ==
- List of legislation in the United Kingdom
- Records of the Parliaments of Scotland
