= Popish Recusants Act 1605 =

Act of the Parliament of England

- Act of Parliament
- Parliament of England
- Long title: An Act to prevent and avoid dangers which may grow by Popish Recusants.
- Citation: 3 Jas. 1. c. 4
- Territorial extent: England and Wales

Dates
- Royal assent: 27 May 1606
- Commencement: 6 January 1606 (Note: Start of session.)
- Repealed: 18 August 1846
Other legislation
Amended by	Roman Catholics Act 1844
Repealed by	Religious Disabilities Act 1846
Relates to	Observance of 5th November Act 1605; Presentation of Benefices Act 1605; Oath of Allegiance, etc. Act 1609

Status: Repealed

Text of statute as originally enacted

The Popish Recusants Act 1605 (3 Jas. 1. c. 4) was an act of the Parliament of England which quickly followed the Gunpowder Plot of the same year, an attempt by English Roman Catholics to assassinate King James I and many of the Parliament.

The act forbade Roman Catholics from practising the professions of law and medicine and from acting as a guardian or trustee; and it allowed magistrates to search their houses for arms. The act also provided a new oath of allegiance, which denied the power of the Pope to depose monarchs. The recusant was to be fined £60 or to forfeit two-thirds of his land if he did not receive the sacrament of the Lord's Supper at least once a year in his Church of England parish church.

Sections 22 and 23 of the act also made it high treason to obey the authority of Rome rather than the King.

== Subsequent developments ==
The whole act was repealed by section 1 of the Religious Disabilities Act 1846 (9 & 10 Vict. c. 59).

== See also ==
- Praemunire
- High treason in the United Kingdom
