= Shop-books Evidence Act 1609 =

Act of the Parliament of England

Shop-books Evidence Act 1609 (Note: The citation of this act by this short title was authorised by section 5 of, and the second schedule to, the Statute Law Revision Act 1948. Due to the repeal of those provisions, it is now authorised by section 19(2) of the Interpretation Act 1978.)
- Act of Parliament
- Parliament of England
- Long title: An Acte to avoide the double Payment of Debtes. (Note: These words are printed against this act in the second column of the second schedule to the Statute Law Revision Act 1948, which is headed "Title".)
- Citation: 7 Jas. 1. c. 12
- Territorial extent: England and Wales

Dates
- Royal assent: 23 July 1610
- Commencement: 25 July 1610 (Note: Section 1. Feast of St. James the Apostle)
- Repealed: 1 January 1970

Other legislation
- Amended by: Continuance, etc. of Laws Act 1623
- Repealed by: Statute Law Revision Act 1863; Statute Law Revision Act 1948; Statute Law (Repeals) Act 1969

Status: Repealed

Text of statute as originally enacted

The Shop-books Evidence Act 1609 (7 Jas. 1. c. 12) was an act of the Parliament of England.

== Subsequent developments ==
The whole act was continued until the end of the first session of the next parliament by the Continuance of Laws, etc. Act 1623 (21 Jas. 1. c. 28) and the Continuance of Laws, etc. Act 1627 (3 Cha. 1 . c. 5).

The words "This Act to contynue to the end of the first Session of the next Parliament and noe longer" at the end of the act were repealed by section 1 of, and the schedule to, the Statute Law Revision Act 1863 (26 & 27 Vict. c. 125), which came into force on 28 July 1863. The footnote to this repeal says that these words are from section 3 in Ruffhead's Edition.

In section 1, the words of commencement, and the words "hereafter to be" wherever occurring, were repealed by section 1 of, and the first schedule to, the Statute Law Revision Act 1948 (11 & 12 Geo. 6. c. 62), which came into force on 30 July 1948.

The whole act, so far as unrepealed, was repealed by section 1 of, and part VII of the schedule to, the Statute Law (Repeals) Act 1969, which came into force on 1 January 1970.
