= Presentation of Benefices Act 1605 =

Act of the Parliament of England

Presentation of Benefices Act 1605 (Note: The citation of this act by this short title was authorised by section 5 of, and the second schedule to, the Statute Law Revision Act 1948. Due to the repeal of those provisions, it is now authorised by section 19(2) of the Interpretation Act 1978.)
- Act of Parliament
- Parliament of England
- Long title: An Acte to prevent & avoid dangers which may grow by Popish Recusantes. (Note: These words are printed against this act in the second column of the second schedule to the Statute Law Revision Act 1948, which is headed "Title".)
- Citation: 3 Jas. 1. c. 5
- Territorial extent: England and Wales

Dates
- Royal assent: 27 May 1606
- Commencement: 6 January 1606 (Note: Start of session.)
- Repealed: 1 January 1989
Other legislation
Amended by	Repeal of Acts Concerning Importation Act 1822; Roman Catholics Act 1844
Repealed by	Patronage (Benefices) Measure 1986
Relates to	Observance of 5th November Act 1605; Popish Recusants Act 1605

Status: Repealed

Text of statute as originally enacted

The Presentation of Benefices Act 1605 (3 Jas. 1. c. 5) was an act of the Parliament of England.

== Subsequent developments ==
The act, except those parts of that act whereby it was enacted "that every Person or Persons that is or shall be a Popish Recusant Convict during the Time that he shall be or remain a Recusant shall from and after the End of the then present Session of Parliament be utterly disabled to present to any Benefice with Cure or without Cure, Prebend or other Ecclesiastical Living, or to collate or nominate any Free School, Hospital or Donative whatsoever, and from the Beginning of the then present Session of Parliament shall likewise be disabled to grant any Avoidance to any Benefice, Prebend, or other Ecclesiastical Living," and which specified the counties, cities and other places and limits or precincts within which the Chancellor and Scholars of the University of Oxford and the Chancellor and Scholars of the University of Cambridge respectively had the presentation, nomination, collation and donation of and to every such benefice, prebend, living, school, hospital and donative as was to happen to be void during such time as a patron thereof was to be and remain a recusant convict as aforesaid, and whereby it was provided "that neither of the said Chancellors and Scholars of either of the said Universities shall present or nominate, to any Benefice with Cure, Prebend, or other Ecclesiastical Living, any such Person as shall then have any other Benefice with Cure of Souls, and if any such Presentation or Nomination shall be had or made of any such Person so beneficed, the said Presentation or Nomination shall be void, any thing in this Act to the contrary notwithstanding:" was repealed by section 1 of the Roman Catholics Act 1844 (7 & 8 Vict. c. 102).

Section 13 of the act was repealed by section 41(2) of, and schedule 5 to, the Patronage (Benefices) Measure 1986.
