= Theatres Act 1843 =

Act of the Parliament of the United Kingdom

Theatres Act 1843 (Note: The citation of this act by this short title was authorised by section 1 of, and the first schedule to, the Short Titles Act 1896. Due to the repeal of those provisions it is now authorised by section 19(2) of the Interpretation Act 1978.)
- Act of Parliament
- Parliament of the United Kingdom
- Long title: An Act for regulating Theatres.
- Citation: 6 & 7 Vict. c. 68
- Territorial extent: Great Britain (Note: Section 24.)

Dates
- Royal assent: 22 August 1843
- Commencement: 22 August 1843 (Note: The Acts of Parliament (Commencement) Act 1793.)
- Repealed: 26 September 1968
Other legislation
Amends	Plays and Wine Licences Act 1736
Repeals/revokes	Theatre Regulation Act 1605; Licensing Act 1737; Theatrical Representations Act 1788
Amended by	Statute Law Revision Act 1874 (No. 2); Summary Jurisdiction Act 1884; Justices of the Peace Act 1949
Repealed by	Theatres Act 1968

Status: Repealed

Text of statute as originally enacted

The Theatres Act 1843 (6 & 7 Vict. c. 68), also known as the Theatre Regulation Act 1843, was an act of the Parliament of the United Kingdom. It amended the regime established under the Licensing Act 1737 (10 Geo. 2. c. 28) for the licensing of the theatre in Great Britain, implementing the proposals made by a select committee of the House of Commons in 1832.

The act restricted the powers of the Lord Chamberlain, so that he could only prohibit the performance of plays where he was of the opinion that "it is fitting for the preservation of good manners, decorum or of the public peace so to do". It also gave additional powers to local authorities to license theatres, breaking the monopoly of the patent theatres and encouraging the development of popular theatrical entertainments, such as saloon theatres attached to public houses and music halls.

== Licensing Act 1737 ==
Under the Licensing Act 1737 (10 Geo. 2. c. 28), the Lord Chamberlain was granted the ability to vet the performance of any new plays: he could prevent any new play, or any modification to an existing play, from being performed for any reason, and was not required to justify his decision. New plays were required to be submitted to the Lord Chamberlain for a licence before they could be performed, and theatre owners could be prosecuted for staging a play (or part of a play) that had not received prior approval. A licence, once granted, could be also withdrawn. The 1737 act also limited spoken drama to the patent theatres, originally only the Theatre Royal, Drury Lane and Theatre Royal, Covent Garden in London. The regime was relaxed slightly by the Theatrical Representations Act 1788 (28 Geo. 3. c. 30), under which local magistrates were permitted to license occasional performances for periods of up to 60 days.

== Theatres Act 1968 ==
The regime established by the 1843 act was considered by a select committee of the House of Commons in 1866, and two parliamentary joint select committees, in 1909 and then in 1966, and various reforms were proposed, but no changes were implemented until the act was finally repealed by the Theatres Act 1968.

== Jurisdiction ==
The act in general was restricted to Great Britain, and more specifically to the vicinities of London, Oxbridge, and royal residences. When George Bernard Shaw's 1909 play The Shewing-Up of Blanco Posnet was refused a licence by the Lord Chamberlain, it was staged in Liverpool and Dublin by the Abbey Theatre players.

== See also ==
- Antitheatricality

== Bibliography ==
- Summary of the report of the Joint Select Committee on Stage Plays (Censorship), 1909
- Summary of the report of the Joint Committee on Censorship of the Theatre, 1966–67
- Articles on theatre and music hall from the Encyclopædia Britannica Eleventh Edition (1911)
- Judith Flanders (2009). ""Penny plain, tuppence coloured: the theatrical spectacular"". Consuming Passions: Leisure and Pleasure in Victorian Britain. HarperCollins. pp. 292–342. ISBN 978-0-00-734762-9.
- Dean, Joan Fitzpatrick (29 April 2010). Riot and Great Anger: Stage Censorship in Twentieth-Century Ireland. Univ of Wisconsin Press. ISBN 9780299196646.
