= Crown Debts Act 1609 =

Act of the Parliament of England

Crown Debts Act 1609 (Note: The citation of this act by this short title was authorised by section 5 of, and the second schedule to, the Statute Law Revision Act 1948. Due to the repeal of those provisions, it is now authorised by section 19(2) of the Interpretation Act 1978.)
- Act of Parliament
- Parliament of England
- Long title: An Acte concerninge some maner of Assignementes of Debtes to His Majesty. (Note: These words are printed against this act in the second column of the second schedule to the Statute Law Revision Act 1948, which is headed "Title".)
- Citation: 7 Jas. 1. c. 15
- Territorial extent: England and Wales

Dates
- Royal assent: 23 July 1610
- Commencement: 1 July 1610 (Note: Section 1.)
- Repealed: 1 January 1970

Other legislation
- Repealed by: Statute Law Revision Act 1948; Statute Law (Repeals) Act 1969

Status: Repealed

Text of statute as originally enacted

The Crown Debts Act 1609 (7 Jas. 1. c. 15) was an act of the Parliament of England.

== Subsequent developments ==
The words of commencement were repealed by section 1 of, and the first schedule to, the Statute Law Revision Act 1948 (11 & 12 Geo. 6. c. 62), which came into force on 30 July 1948.

The whole act, so far as unrepealed was repealed by section 1 of, and part VII of the schedule to, the Statute Law (Repeals) Act 1969, which came into force on 1 January 1970.
