= Usury Act 1660 =

Act of the Parliament of England

- Act of Parliament
- Parliament of England
- Long title: An Act for restraining the taking of Excessive Usury.
- Citation: 12 Cha. 2. c. 13
- Territorial extent: England and Wales

Dates
- Royal assent: 29 August 1660
- Commencement: 29 September 1660 (Note: Section 1.)
- Repealed: 10 August 1854
Other legislation
Amends	Usury Act 1623
Amended by	Confirmation of Acts (No. 3) Act 1661; Usury Act 1714; Usury Act 1840; Usury Act 1841; Usury Act 1843; Usury Act 1845; Usury Act 1850
Repealed by	Usury Laws Repeal Act 1854
Relates to	Usury Act 1545; Usury Act 1623; Confirmation of Acts (No. 3) Act 1661

Status: Repealed

Text of statute as originally enacted

The Usury Act 1660 (12 Cha. 2. c. 13) was an act of the Parliament of England with the long title "An Act for restraining the taking of Excessive Usury".

The purpose of the act was to reduce the maximum interest rate from 8% (imposed in 1624 by the Usury Act 1623 (21 Jas. 1. c. 17)) to 6%. The legislation had been enacted in 1651 under the Commonwealth, but this act was passed to confer legality on the measure following the Restoration of Charles II.

== Subsequent developments ==
The act was. confirmed by section 1 of the Confirmation of Acts (No. 3) Act 1661 (13 Cha. 2. St. 1. c. 14).

The act was amended by the Usury Act 1714 (13 Ann. c. 15), which further reduced the interest rate to 5%; the Usury Act 1840 (3 & 4 Vict. c. 83), the Usury Act 1841 (4 & 5 Vict. c. 54), the Usury Act 1843 (6 & 7 Vict. c. 45) the Usury Act 1845 (8 & 9 Vict. c. 102) and the Usury Act 1850 (13 & 14 Vict. c. 56).

The whole act was repealed by section 1 of, and the schedule to, the Usury Laws Repeal Act 1854 (17 & 18 Vict. c. 90), which came into force on 10 August 1854.
