= Anniversary Days Observance Act 1859 =

Act of the Parliament of the United Kingdom

- Act of Parliament
- Parliament of the United Kingdom
- Long title: An Act to repeal certain Acts and Parts of Acts which relate to the Observance of the Thirtieth of January and other Days.
- Citation: 22 Vict. c. 2
- Territorial extent: United Kingdom

Dates
- Royal assent: 25 March 1859
- Commencement: 25 March 1859 (Note: The Acts of Parliament (Commencement) Act 1793.)
- Repealed: 11 August 1875
Other legislation
Amends	Attainder of the Regicides, etc. Act 1660; Confirmation of Acts Act 1661; Confirmation of Acts (No. 2) Act 1661; Calendar (New Style) Act 1750
Repeals/revokes	Observance of 5th November Act 1605; Observance of 29th May Act 1660
Repealed by	Statute Law Revision Act 1875
Relates to	Bank Holidays Act 1871

Status: Repealed

Text of statute as originally enacted

The Anniversary Days Observance Act 1859 (22 Vict. c. 2) was an act of the Parliament of the United Kingdom which repealed several laws mandating "political services" or "state services": observance by the Church of England and Church of Ireland of certain anniversaries from 17th-century political history.

== Provisions ==
The laws and observances abolished were specified by various acts of the Parliament of England, Parliament of Great Britain, or Parliament of Ireland. These acts were repealed in full where they had no other purpose than establishing the relevant observance, and otherwise repealed only in relation to the observance.

Act	Year passed	Date observed	Event commemorated
Observance of 5th November Act 1605 (3 Jas. 1. c. 1)	1605	5 November (Guy Fawkes Night)	1605 failure of the Gunpowder Plot. (From 1689, the prayer service also commemorated the landing of William of Orange at Brixham on 5 November 1688 at the start of the Glorious Revolution.)
Observance of 29th May Act 1660 (12 Cha. 2. c. 14) and Confirmation of Acts Act 1661 (13 Cha. 2. c. 7) (Note: This act confirmed the observance established by the earlier act(s).)	1660 and 1661	29 May (Oak Apple Day)	1660 Restoration of the monarchy (Also Charles II's birthday in 1630.)
Attainder of the Regicides, etc. Act 1660 (12 Cha. 2 c. 30) and Confirmation of Acts (No. 2) Act 1661 (13 Cha. 2 c. 11)	1660 and 1661	30 January (King Charles the Martyr)	1649 Execution ("martyrdom") of Charles I
Calendar (New Style) Act 1750 (24 Geo. 2. c. 23)	1750	5 November, 29 May, 30 January	As above
Observance of 29th May Act 1662 (14 & 15 Chas. 2 Sess. 4. c. 1 (I))	1662	29 May	As above
Observance of 23rd October Act 1662 (14 & 15 Chas. 2 Sess. 4. c. 23 (I))	1662	23 October	1641 Rebellion's failure to capture Dublin Castle

== Legislative history ==
The political and religious aspects of Anglican identity began to separate after Catholic emancipation culminated in the Roman Catholic Relief Act 1829 (10 Geo. 4. c. 7). In the 1850s, moves to increased religious toleration included the Liberty of Religious Worship Act 1855 (18 & 19 Vict. c. 86) and the Jews Relief Act 1858 (21 & 22 Vict. c. 49). These changes were reflected in June and July 1858, when the House of Lords and House of Commons respectively passed resolutions making loyal addresses to Queen Victoria to remove certain "occasional forms of prayer" from the 1662 Book of Common Prayer. These prayers were re-specified by royal warrant after each new monarch's accession. The Crown agreed to consider the matter.

After some delay for legal advice, on 17 January 1859 the queen issued a new warrant removing the prayers. However, the observances which the prayers fulfilled were mandated by various acts of Parliament; so a bill, initially called the Occasional Forms of Prayer Bill, was introduced in February 1859 to repeal the provisions which were no longer being enforced. Whereas the 1858 petitions had related only to observances in the English Book of Common Prayer, the 1859 bill additionally deleted the 23 October prayer from the Irish Book of Common Prayer. In the House of Lords the bill was renamed the Anniversary Days Observance Bill. It received royal assent on 25 March.

== Criticism ==
In the House of Lords, the 1858 resolution was supported by most bishops; John Bird Sumner Archbishop of Canterbury and Archibald Campbell Tait, Samuel Wilberforce and Robert Daly (bishops of London, of Oxford, and of Cashel respectively) spoke in favour, while Christopher Bethell Bishop of Bangor opposed it. The Anglo-Catholic liturgist Vernon Staley in 1907 described the deletions as ultra vires because they were done without first obtaining the consent of the Convocations of Canterbury and York; he called them "a distinct violation of the compact between Church and Realm, as set forth in the Act of Uniformity which imposed the Book of Common Prayer in 1662".

== Subsequent developments ==
The whole act was repealed, as being spent, by section 1 of, and the schedule to, the Statute Law Revision Act 1875 (38 & 39 Vict. c. 66), which came into force on 11 August 1875.

== See also ==
- Bank Holidays Act 1871

== Bibliography ==
Primary

- "[22 Vict. c.2] An Act to repeal certain Acts and Parts of Acts which relate to the Observance of the Thirtieth of January and other Days". A collection of the public general statutes passed in the 22nd year of the reign of Her Majesty Queen Victoria. Eyre and Spottiswoode. 1859. pp. 2–3.
- "29. A Form of Prayer for the Fifth Day of November; 30. A Form of Prayer for the Thirtieth Day of January; 31. A Form of Prayer for the Twenty-ninth Day of May". The Book of Common Prayer. W. Baxter. 1825. pp. 828–848.
- "A Form of Divine Service to be used, October the Twenty Third". The Book of Common Prayer of the Church of Ireland. Society of Archbishop Justus. 1666.

Secondary

- Hefling, Charles (1 July 2006). "The State Services". In Hefling, Charles; Shattuck, Cynthia (eds.). The Oxford Guide to The Book of Common Prayer: A Worldwide Survey. Oxford University Press. pp. 73–75. ISBN 9780199723898.
- Lacey, Andrew (2003). "Our Own Our Royal Saint". The Cult of King Charles the Martyr. Boydell & Brewer. pp. 236–251. ISBN 9780851159225.
- Staley, Vernon (1907). "The Commemoration of King Charles the Martyr". Liturgical studies. London: Longmans, Green. pp. 66–83.
