= Convention Parliament (1660) =

Parliament of England

The Convention Parliament of England (25 April 1660 – 29 December 1660) followed the Long Parliament that had finally voted for its own dissolution on 16 March that year. Elected as a "free parliament", i.e. with no oath of allegiance to the Commonwealth or to the monarchy, it was predominantly Royalist in its membership. It assembled for the first time on 25 April 1660.

After the Declaration of Breda had been received, Parliament proclaimed on 8 May that King Charles II had been the lawful monarch since the death of Charles I in January 1649. The Convention Parliament then proceeded to conduct the necessary preparation for the Restoration Settlement. These preparations included the necessary provisions to deal with land and funding such that the new régime could operate.

Reprisals against the establishment which had developed under Oliver Cromwell were constrained under the terms of the Indemnity and Oblivion Act which became law on 29 August 1660. Nonetheless, there were prosecutions against those accused of regicide, the direct participation in the trial and execution of Charles I.

The Convention Parliament was dissolved by Charles II on 29 December 1660. The succeeding parliament was elected in May 1661, and was called the Cavalier Parliament. It set about both systematically dismantling or recasting all legislation and institutions which had been introduced during the Interregnum, and confirming of the Acts of the Convention Parliament.

== Composition ==
Despite former Parliamentarians having a technical headcount plurality over Royalists (180 over 110 by one count), the Royalists were able to outmaneuver them by relying on a large number of new inexperienced delegates and on the complete disunity and lack of leadership of the former parliamentarians on most matters of contention.

== Legislation ==
In legal statutes, the Convention parliament is cited as 12 Cha. 2 (parliamentary session of the "12th regnal year of Charles II"). Among the acts passed by it were:

- Parliament Act 1660 (c.1)
- An Act for putting in execution an Ordinance mentioned in this Act
- An Act for the Continuance of Processe and Judiciall Proceedings
- Tunnage and Poundage Act (c.4), with schedule of very high customs duties, which remained largely unchanged until the 18th century.
- Continuation of Excise Tax until 20 August 1660
- An Act for the present Nominating of Commissioners of Sewers.
- An Act for restoreing unto James Marquesse of Ormond etc.
- An Act for continuing of the Excise till the five and twentyeth day of December One thousand six hundred and sixty.
- Establishment of a poll tax (c.9) to pay off the disbanding of the New Model Army
- An Act for supplying and explaining certaine defects in an Act entituled An Act for the speedy provision of money for disbanding and paying off the forces of this kingdome both by Land and Sea.
- Indemnity and Oblivion Act (c.11)
- Legal Proceedings During Commonwealth Act 1660 (c.12)
- An Act for restraining the taking of Excessive Usury
- An Act for a Perpetuall Anniversary Thanksgiveing on the nine and twentyeth day of May
- An Act for the speedy disbanding of the Army and Garrisons of this Kingdome
- An Act for inabling the Souldiers of the Army now to be disbanded to exercise Trades
- An Act for the Confirming and Restoreing of Ministers
- the Navigation Act (c.18)
- An Act to prevent Fraudes and Concealments of His Majestyes Customes and Subsidyes
- An Act for raising seavenscore thousand pounds for the complete disbanding of the whole Army and paying off some part of the Navy
- An Act for the speedy raising of Seaventy thousand pounds for the present Supply of his Majestye
- An Act for the Regulating of the Trade of Bay making in the Dutchy Bay Hall in Colchester
- A Grant of certaine Impositions upon Beere Ale and other Liquors for the encrease of His Majestyes Revenue during His Life
- Tenures Abolitions Act (c.24)
- An Act for the better Ordering the Selling of Wines by Retaile, and for preventing Abuses in the Mingling Corrupting and Vitiating of Wines, and for Setting and Limitting the Prices of the same
- An Act for the levying of the Arreares of the twelve moneths Assessment commenceing the fower and twentyeth [day] of June One thousand six hundred fifty nine, and the six moneths Assessment commenceing the five and twentyeth [day] of December One thousand sixe hundred fifty nine
- An Act for granting unto the Kings Majestic Fower hundred and twenty thousand pounds by an Assessment of three score and ten thousand pounds by the moneth for six moneths for disbanding the remainder of the Army, and paying off the Navy
- An Act for further suplying and explaining certaine defects in an Act intituled An Act for the speedy provision of money for disbanding and paying off the forces of this kingdome both by land and sea
- An Act for the raiseing of seaventy thousand pounds for the further supply of his Majestie
- An Act for the Attainder of severall persons guilty of the horrid Murther of his late Sacred Majestie King Charles the first
- An Act for the raiseing of seaventy thousand pounds for the further supply of his Majestie
- An Act for Confirmation of Leases and Grants from Colledges and Hospitalls
- Prohibition of wool exports (c.32)
- An Act for Confirmation of Marriages
- Prohibition of tobacco plantations in British Isles (c.34)
- Establishment of the General Post Office (c.35)
- An Act impowering the Master of the Rolls for the time being to make Leases for yeares in order to new build the old houses belonging to the Rolls

As all the acts of the Commonwealth parliaments were obliterated from the legal record, the Convention Parliament replicated some of the legislation they wanted to keep (e.g. the Navigation Act 1651) in new acts.

== See also ==
- List of MPs elected to the English Parliament in 1660
- 1661 English general election
