= Usury Laws Repeal Act 1854 =

Act of the Parliament of the United Kingdom

Usury Laws Repeal Act 1854 (Note: The citation of this act by this short title was authorised by section 1 of, and the first schedule to, the Short Titles Act 1896. Due to the repeal of those provisions it is now authorised by section 19(2) of the Interpretation Act 1978.)
- Act of Parliament
- Parliament of the United Kingdom
- Long title: An Act to repeal the Laws relating to Usury, and to the Enrolment of Annuities.
- Citation: 17 & 18 Vict. c. 90
- Territorial extent: United Kingdom

Dates
- Royal assent: 10 August 1854
- Commencement: 10 August 1854 (Note: The Acts of Parliament (Commencement) Act 1793.)
- Repealed: 27 May 1976
Other legislation
Amends	See § Repealed enactments
Repeals/revokes	See § Repealed enactments
Amended by	Pawnbrokers Act 1872; Statute Law Revision Act 1875; Statute Law Revision Act 1892
Repealed by	Statute Law (Repeals) Act 1976
Relates to	Usury Act 1623

Status: Repealed

Text of statute as originally enacted

The Usury Laws Repeal Act 1854(17 & 18 Vict. c. 90) was an act of the Parliament of the United Kingdom that repealed enactments relating to usury in the United Kingdom. The act relaxed all restrictions on usury.

== Provisions ==
=== Repealed enactments ===
Section 1 of the act repealed 20 enactments, listed in the schedule to the act, in addition to "all existing Laws against Usury".

Section 2 of the act provided that nothing in the act would affect transactions done before the passing of the act.

Section 3 of the act provided that interest on existing contracts would be recoverable as if the act had not been passed.

Section 4 of the act provided that nothing in the act would affect pawnbrokers.

Acts of the Parliament of England, Parliament of Great Britain and Parliament of the United Kingdom
Citation	Short title	Long title	Extent of repeal
37 Hen. 8. c. 9	Usury Act 1545	An Act passed in the Thirty-seventh Year of the Reign of King Henry the Eighth, intituled “A Bill against Usury.”	The whole act.
13 Eliz. 1. c.	Usury Act 1571	An Act passed in the Thirteenth Year of the Reign of Queen Elizabeth, intituled An Act against Usury.”	The whole act.
3 Cha. 1. c. 5	Continuance of Laws, etc. Act 1627	An Act passed in the Third Year of the Reign of King Charles the First.	As enacts that an Act passed in the Twenty-first Year of King James the First, intituled An Act against Usury,” (Note: Usury Act 1623 (21 Jas. 1. c. 17)) be made perpetual. (Note: The Usury Act 1623 (21 Jas. 1. c. 17) was subsequently repealed by the Statute Law Revision Act 1863 (26 & 27 Vict. c. 125).)
12 Cha. 2. c. 13	Usury Act 1660	An Act passed in the Twelfth Year of the Reign of King Charles the Second, intituled An Act for the restraining the taking of excessive Usury.”	The whole act.
13 Cha. 2. St. 1. c. 14	Confirmation of Acts (No. 3) Act 1661	An Act passed in the Thirteenth Year of the Reign of King Charles the Second, intituled “An Act for confirming an Act intituled ‘An Act for encouraging and ‘increasing of Shipping and Navigation,’ and several other Acts, both public and private, mentioned therein”.	As confirms the herein-before mentioned Act of the Twelfth Year of the same Reign.
13 Ann. c. 15 (Note: This is the citation in The Statutes of the Realm.)	Usury Act 1713	Aan Act passed in the Twelfth Year of the Reign of Queen Anne, intituled “An Act to reduce the Rate of Interest, without any Prejudice to Parliamentary Securities."	The whole act.
53 Geo. 3. c. 141	Inrolment of Grants of Annuities Act 1813	Aan Act passed in the Fifty-third Year of the Reign of King George the Third, intituled "An Act to repeal an Act of the Seventeenth Year of the Reign of His present Majesty, intituled 'An Act for registering the Grants of Life Annuities, and for the better Protection of Infants against such Grants, and to substitute other Provisions in lieu thereof'".	Except so much thereof as repeals the said Act of the Seventeenth Year of King George the Third.
3 Geo. 4. c. 92	Memorials of Grants of Annuities Act 1822	An Act passed in the Third Year of the Reign of King George the Fourth, intituled “An Act to explain an Act of the Fifty-third Year of the Reign of His late Majesty, respecting the Enrolment of Memorials of Grants of Annuities."	The whole act.
7 Geo. 4. c. 75	Memorials of Grants of Annuities Act 1826	An Act passed in the Seventh Year of King George the Fourth, intituled “An Act to explain an Act of the Fifty-third Year of the Reign of His late Majesty, respecting the Enrolment of Memorials of Grants of Annuities.”	The whole act.
5 & 6 Will. 4. c. 41	Gaming Act 1835	An Act passed in the Session of Parliament holden in the Fifth and Sixth Years of the Reign of King William the Fourth, intituled “An Act to amend the Law relating to Securities given for Considerations arising out of gaming, usurious, and other illegal Transactions."	As relates to Securities given for Considerations arising out of usurious Transactions.
13 & 14 Vict. c. 56	Usury Act 1850	An Act passed in the Session of Parliament holden in the Thirteenth and Fourteenth Years of the Reign of Her present Majesty, intituled "An Act to continue the Act for exempting certain Bills of Exchange and Promissory Notes from the Operation of the Usury Laws.”	The whole act.

Acts of the Parliament of Scotland
Citation	Short title	Long title	Extent of repeal
1587 c. 52 (Note: This is the citation in the Duodecimal Edition.)	Usury Act 1587	An Act of the Eleventh Parliament of King James the Sixth, Chapter Fifty-two, “It is not lesum to take ane greater annual Rent for the 100 Poundes nor Ten Poundes, or Five Bolls Victual.”	The whole act.
1594 c. 222	Usary Act 1594	An Act of the Fourteenth Parliament of King James the Sixth, Chapter Two hundred and twenty-two, "For Punishment of Committers of Usury.”	The whole act.
1597 c. 251	Usary Act 1597	An Act of the Fifteenth Parliament of King James the Sixth, Chapter Two hundred and fifty-one, “It is not leasum to take mair annuall Rent or Profet nor Ten for the Hundreth.”	The whole act.
1600 c. 7	Ursury Act 1600	An Act of the Sixteenth Parliament of King James the Sixth, Chapter Seven, Explanation of the Acts of Parliament anent Ocker and Usury.”	The whole act.
1621 c. 28	Usury Act 1621	An Act of the Twenty-third Parliament of King James the Sixth, Chapter Twenty- eight, Anent taking of annual Rent beforehand to be Usurie.”	The whole act.

Acts of the Parliament of Ireland
Citation	Short title	Long title	Extent of repeal
10 Chas. 1. Sess. 2. c. 22 (I)	Pawnbrokers Act 1634	An Act of the Tenth Year of King Charles the First, Session Two, Chapter Twenty-two, intituled "An Act against Usury."	The whole act.
2 Anne c. 16 (I)	Pawnbrokers Act 1703	An Act of the Second Year of Queen Anne, Chapter Sixteen, intituled "An Act for reducing of Interest of Money to Eight per Cent. for the future."	The whole act.
8 Geo. 1. c. 13 (I)	Pawnbrokers Act 1721	An Act of the Eighth Year of King George the First, Chapter Thirteen, intituled "An Act for reducing the Interest of Money to Seven per Cent.”	The whole act.
5 Geo. 2. c. 7 (I)	Pawnbrokers Act 1731	An Act of the Fifth Year of King George the Second, Chapter Seven, intituled An Act for reducing the Interest of Money to Six per Cent,”	The whole act.

== Subsequent developments ==
The broad terms of the repeal of "all existing Laws against Usury" by the act meant that some acts relating to usury were repealed by subsequent statute law revision acts, including the

- Statute Law Revision Act 1863 (26 & 27 Vict. c. 125)
- Statute Law Revision (Scotland) Act 1906 (6 Edw. 7. c. 38)

Section 4 of the act "as far as that section provides that all laws touching and concerning Pawnbrokers shall remain in full force and effect to all intents and purposes whatsoever as if that Act had not been passed." was repealed by section 4 of, and the first schedule to, the Pawnbrokers Act 1872 (35 & 36 Vict. c. 93), which came into force on 31 December 1872.

Section 1 of the act to "hereto," and section two of, and the schedule to, the act were repealed by section 1 of, and the schedule to, the Statute Law Revision Act 1875 (38 & 39 Vict. c. 66), which came into force on 11 August 1875.

In the seventh report on statute law revision published in 1975, the Law Commission and Scottish Law Commission proposed the repeal of the act.

The unrepealed residue of the Usury Laws Repeal Act 1854 is spent because, among other reasons, there are no pre-1854 Acts still in force relating to pawnbrokers.

The whole act was repealed by section 1(1) of, and part XI of schedule 1 to, the Statute Law (Repeals) Act 1976, which came into force on 27 May 1976.
