= Indemnity and Oblivion Act 1660 =

Act of the Parliament of England

- Act of Parliament
- Parliament of England
- Long title: An Act of Free and Generall Pardon, Indemnity, and Oblivion.
- Citation: 12 Cha. 2. c. 11
- Territorial extent: England and Wales

Dates
- Royal assent: 29 August 1660
- Commencement: 25 April 1660 (Note: Start of session.)
- Repealed: 30 July 1948
Other legislation
Repealed by	Statute Law Revision Act 1948
Relates to	Confirmation of Acts Act 1661; Legal Proceedings During Commonwealth Act 1661

Status: Repealed

Text of statute as originally enacted

The Indemnity and Oblivion Act 1660 (12 Cha. 2. c. 11) was an act of the Parliament of England, the long title of which is "An Act of Free and Generall Pardon, Indemnity, and Oblivion". This act was a general pardon for everyone who had committed crimes during the English Civil War and subsequent Commonwealth period, with the exception of certain crimes such as murder (without a licence granted by King or Parliament), piracy, buggery, rape and witchcraft, and people named in the act such as those involved in the regicide of Charles I. It also said that no action was to be taken against those involved at any later time, and that the Interregnum was to be legally forgotten.

== History ==
The act fulfilled the suggestion given in the Declaration of Breda that reprisals against the establishment which had developed during the English Interregnum would be restricted to those who had officiated in the regicide of King Charles I.

The passage of the act through the Convention Parliament was secured by Lord Clarendon, the first minister of King Charles II, and it became law on 29 August 1660 during the first year of the English Restoration.

The lands of the Crown and the established Church were automatically restored, but lands of Royalists and other dissenters confiscated and sold during the Civil War and interregnum were left for private negotiation or litigation, meaning that the government would not help the Loyalists in regaining their property. Disappointed Royalists commented that the act meant "indemnity for [Charles'] enemies and oblivion for his friends". Historians, on the other hand, have generally praised the King and Clarendon for the generosity and clemency of the act, in an age not normally noted for mercy. Twenty years later, during the Popish Plot, Charles tried unsuccessfully to stand against the relentless demand for the execution of Catholic priests, and reminded the public sharply of how many of them had previously benefited from his reluctance to shed blood.

The act is often viewed from the perspective of those who were not pardoned and thus condemned to death. However, the debate in Parliament continued almost every day for over two months and names were added and taken off the list of those who were not to be pardoned. Initially, there were only seven on the list: Thomas Harrison, William Say, John Jones Maesygarnedd, Thomas Scot, John Lisle, Cornelius Holland, and John Barkstead. On 7 June, the Commons, mindful of the Declaration of Breda, stated they as the Commons could add to the list others who would not be covered by the general pardon. They immediately added John Cooke, Andrew Broughton, Edward Dendy, and the "Two Persons who were upon the Scaffold in a Disguise" (i.e. the executioners). On 8 June, the Commons voted "That the Number of Twenty, and no more, (other than those that are already excepted, or sat as Judges upon the late King's Majesty) shall be excepted out of the Act of general Pardon and Oblivion, for and in respect only of such Pains, Penalties, and Forfeitures, (not extending to Life) as shall be thought fit to be inflicted on them by another Act, intended to be hereafter passed for that purpose".

One of the people to benefit directly from the act was John Milton, who was released from prison.

== Overview of sections ==
Sections:

- Preamble: The causes and ends of this pardon and indemnity.
- Preamble: The general pardon.
- II. Abettors of such Treasons and other Crimes pardoned,
- III. All Appeals, Personal Actions, and Suits, &c. by reason of any Trespass, &c. pardoned.
- VI. The like by reason of any Commission by the late or present King, or by Colour of any Ordinance of one or both Houses of Parliament, or the late Protector, &c.
- V. All appeals, personal actions and suits, pardoned.
- VI. Wardships and mean profits unreceived.
- VII. All things not excepted shall be pardoned by the general words of this act, as well as if particularly named.
- VIII. This pardon &c. to be expounded in all courts most beneficial for the subject.
- IX. The penalty of any officer, &c. that shall go about to disquiet or trouble any person pardoned by this act.
- X. Exceptions out of this pardon. All murders not comprised in the first clause of this pardon excepted. Piracy excepted. Buggery. Rape and the wilful taking away any maid excepted. Double marriages excepted Witchcraft excepted 1 Jas. 1. c. 2. Accounts of certain treasures and receivers. 13 Cha. 2. St. 1. c. 3.
- XI. Proviso for the heirs, &c. of lands of accountants excepted.
- XII. Fees and salaries, &c. not to be accounted for.
- XIII. Military payments not to be accounted for.
- XIV. No person to be called to an account after 14 June 1662.
- XV. Discharges and quietus est given in the exchequer. Accounts of the revenues of churches in Wales. Bribery, subornation, forging, debentures, &c. witnesses.
- XVI. Imbezilling and purloining the King's goods.
- XVII. Issues, fines, amerciaments received by sheriffs
- XVIII. Jesuits, seminaries and Romish priests excepted. 27 Eliz. 1. c. 2.
- XIX. Writs of capias utiagatum may be directed against any person. The party outlawed may sue out a scire facias against the plaintiff.
- XX. Persons outlawed upon capias ad satisfaciendum, &c.
- XXI. Information and proceedings concerning highways &c. excepted. 25 Cha. 2. c. 5. s. 19.
- XXII. Obligation and recognizance not forfeited.
- XXIII. All acts of hostility, injuries &c. between the King and his parliament to be put in perpetual oblivion.
- XXIV. The penalty upon any person that shall within three years use any words of reproach or disgrace, tending to revive the memory of the late differences.
- XXV. Persons plotting or designing the Irish rebellion excepted. 16 Cha. 1. c. 33.
- XXVI. Every person pardoned may plead the general issue.
- XXVII. Thefts and felonies since 4 March 1659. excepted.
- XXVIII. This act not to extend to goods to be restored upon the act for repeal of two act for sequestrations.
- XXIX. Goods, &c. sequestered and actually paid into any publick treasury.
- XXX. Persons who have received privately for his Majesty supply, to account.
- XXXI. Monies received upon decimation not pardoned
- XXXII. Persons that have had directions or instructions for his Majesty, and have betrayed their trust, or his councils excepted.
- XXXIII. Duties of excise, and from farmers thereof, excepted.
- XXXIV. Persons excepted by name.
- XXXV. Persons that appeared and rendered themselves.
- XXXVIII. The lands and goods of the persons rendering themselves not excepted.
- XXXIX. Persons excepted for their penalties not extending to life. 13 Cha. 2. St. 1. c. 15.
- XL. Sir Arthur Hasilrig.
- XLI. Persons made incapable of any office.
- XLII. Sir Henry Vane, John Lambert excepted.
- XLIII. Penalty of certain persons, if they shall after the first of Sept. 1660. accept any office.
- XLIV. Persons that gave sentence upon any illegal high courts of justice.
- XLV. Persons intrusted by ordinance 1649. about tithes, shall be accountable.
- XLVI. Bonds taken in his Majesty's name before May 1642 for securities of any his Majesty's receivers, not pardoned. &c.
- XLVII. Payments upon proportions of 150000l customs.
- XLVIII. Arrears of excise upon beer and ale.
- XLIX. Monies due for free quarter.
- L. Purchasers bona fide of lands, other than the King's &c to enjoy their purchases.
- LI. Fabrick lands, church goods and utensils

== Timeline for the English legislation ==
- 9 May 1660: Pardon and Oblivion, First reading.
- 12 May 1660: Pardon and Oblivion, Second reading.
- 17 May 1660: Bill of Pardon and Oblivion, to go to committee.
- 11 July 1660 Pardon and Oblivion, That the Title of this Bill be, "An Act of free and general Pardon, Indemnity, and Oblivion" Passed and was sent to the House of Lords.
- 20 July 1660: Proceedings of Regicide, Ordered, That the Instrument for proclaiming the High Court of Justice for judging of the late King's Majesty, together with the Journal of their Proceedings, be sent to the Lords, to be by them made use of.
- 7 August 1660: Lords reminded of Bills, including "The Act of General Pardon, Indemnity, and Oblivion".
- 11 August 1660: Pardon and Oblivion, back from House of Lords with Provisoes, Alterations, and Additions. Passed to committee.
- 13 August 1660: passed amendments and the Bill was sent to the House of Lords.
- 16 August 1660: Lords desired a conference concerning the Act of Indemnity.
- 28 August 1660: Pardon and Oblivion, the House agreed to the final amendments to which a joint house conference had agreed and ordered that the Bill of "General Pardon, Indemnity, and Oblivion" be sent to the Lords, as it was now amended. The reply came back from the House of Lords that his Majesty would "be pleased to come To-morrow Morning, to pass the Bill, as is desired".
- 29 August 1660: Bills passed. One of which was "An Act of Free and General Pardon, Indemnity, and Oblivion".

== Irish act ==
An Irish act by the same name "An Act of Free and General Pardon, Indemnity, and Oblivion [for Ireland]" was sent to the Duke of Ormonde on 16 August 1664 by Sir Paul Davys, the Irish Secretary of State.

== In popular culture ==
The act forms the basis for Robert Harris's 2022 novel Act of Oblivion .

== Subsequent developments ==
The whole act was repealed by section 1 of, and the first schedule to, the Statute Law Revision Act 1948 (11 & 12 Geo. 6. c. 62), which came into force on 30 July 1948.

== See also ==
- Act of General Pardon and Oblivion 1652
- Act of Indemnity and Free Pardon 1659
- Act of indemnity and oblivion (Scotland) 1662
