= Oak Apple Day =

29 May (English Stuart restoration 1660)

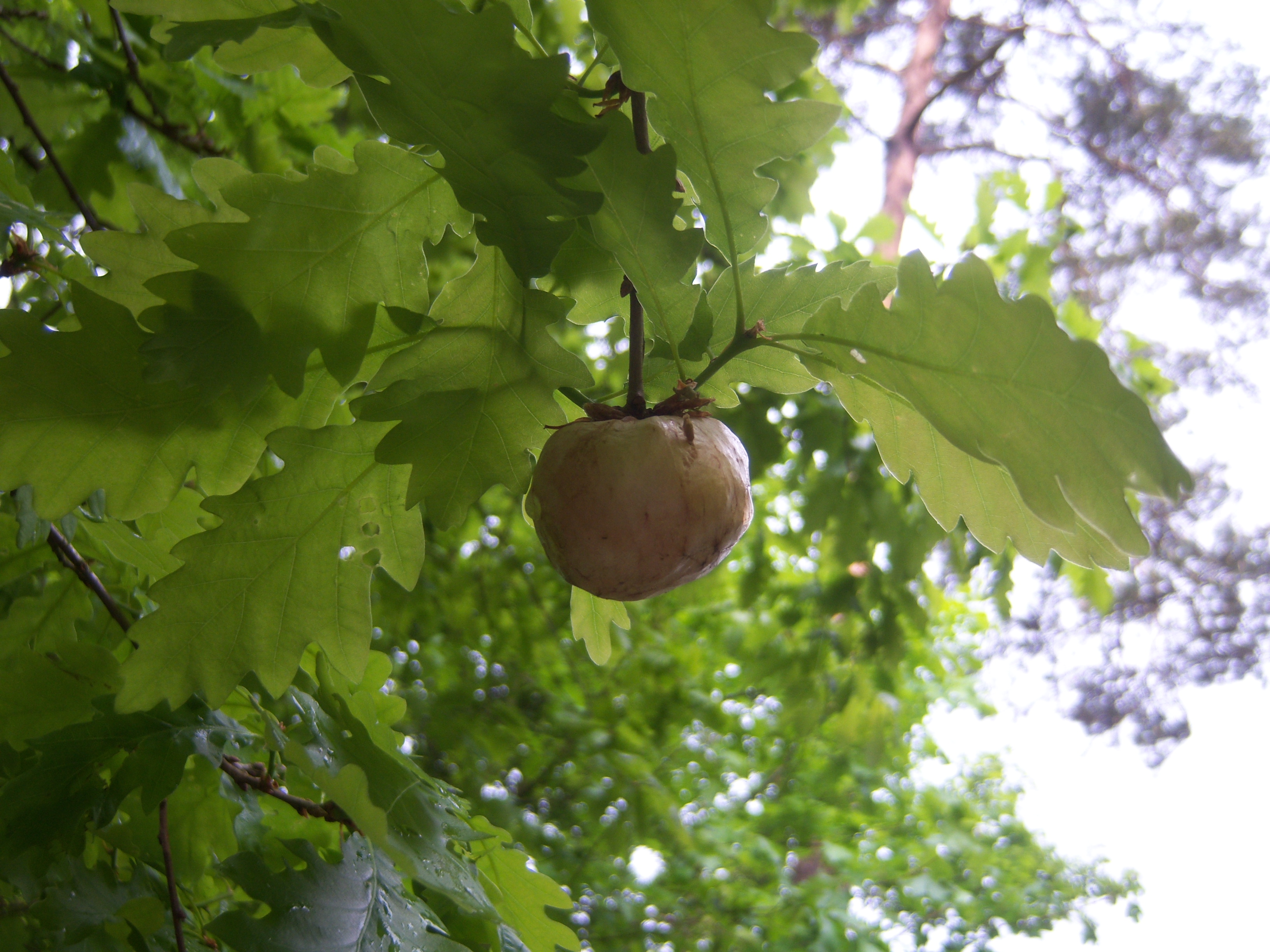
- An oak apple
- Also called: Restoration Day; Royal Oak Day; Shick Shack Day; Oak and Nettle Day
- Type: Historical
- Observances: Wearing of sprigs of oak leaves and/or oak apples
- Date: 29 May
- Next time: 29 May 2027
- Frequency: Annual
- First time: 1661

Restoration Day, more commonly known as Oak Apple Day or Royal Oak Day, was an English, Welsh and Irish public holiday, observed annually on 29 May, to commemorate the restoration of the Stuart monarchy in May 1660. In some parts of England the day is still celebrated. It has also been known as Shick Shack Day, or Oak and Nettle Day.

Observance of 29th May Act 1660
- Act of Parliament
- Parliament of England
- Long title: An Act for a Perpetuall Anniversary Thanksgiveing on the nine and twentieth day of May.
- Citation: 12 Cha. 2. c. 14
- Territorial extent: England and Wales; Isle of Man

Dates
- Royal assent: 29 August 1660
- Commencement: 25 April 1660 (Note: Start of session.)
- Repealed: England and Wales: 25 March 1859; Isle of Man: 25 July 1991
Other legislation
| Repealed by | England and Wales: Anniversary Days Observance Act 1859; Isle of Man: Statute Law Revision (Isle of Man) Act 1991 |
| Relates to | Confirmation of Acts (No. 2) Act 1661; Observance of 29th May Act 1662 |

Status: Repealed

Text of statute as originally enacted

In 1660, the English Parliament passed into law "An Act for a Perpetual Anniversary Thanksgiving on the Nine and Twentieth Day of May", the Observance of 29th May Act 1660 (12 Cha. 2. c. 14), declaring 29 May a public holiday "for keeping of a perpetual Anniversary, for a Day of Thanksgiving to God, for the great Blessing and Mercy he hath been graciously pleased to vouchsafe to the People of these Kingdoms, after their manifold and grievous Sufferings, in the Restoration of his Majesty..." Charles II of England, returning from exile, entered London on 29 May 1660, his 30th birthday.

The public holiday was abolished under the Anniversary Days Observance Act 1859, but the date retains some significance in local and institutional customs. It is, for example, still observed as Founder's Day by the Royal Hospital Chelsea, which was founded by Charles II in 1681.

Observance of 29th May Act 1662
- Act of Parliament
- Parliament of Ireland
- Long title: An Act for a Perpetual Anniversary Thanksgiving, on the Nine and Twentieth day of May, in this Kingdom.
- Citation: 14 & 15 Chas. 2 Sess. 4. c. 1 (I)
- Territorial extent: Ireland

Dates
- Royal assent: 1662
- Commencement: 1662
- Repealed: 25 March 1859
Other legislation
| Repealed by | Anniversary Days Observance Act 1859 |
| Relates to | Observance of 29th May Act 1660 |

Status: Repealed

Text of statute as originally enacted

In Ireland, Oak Apple Day was made a public holiday under the 'Observance of 29th May Act 1662 (14 & 15 Chas. 2 Sess. 4. c. 1 (I)).

== Ceremonies ==
Traditional celebrations to commemorate the event often entailed the wearing of oak apples (a type of plant gall, possibly known in some parts of the country as a "shick-shack") or sprigs of oak leaves, in reference to the occasion after the Battle of Worcester in September 1651, when Charles II escaped the Roundhead army by hiding in an oak tree near Boscobel House. Anyone who failed to wear a sprig of oak risked being pelted with bird's eggs or thrashed with nettles. In Sussex, those not wearing oak were liable to be pinched, giving rise to the unofficial name of "Pinch-bum Day"; similarly it was known as "Bumping Day" in Essex.

In Upton Grey, Hampshire, after the church bells had been rung at 6 am the bell-ringers used to place a large branch of oak over the church porch, and another over the lychgate. Smaller branches were positioned in the gateway of every house to ensure good luck for the rest of the year.

== Modern events ==
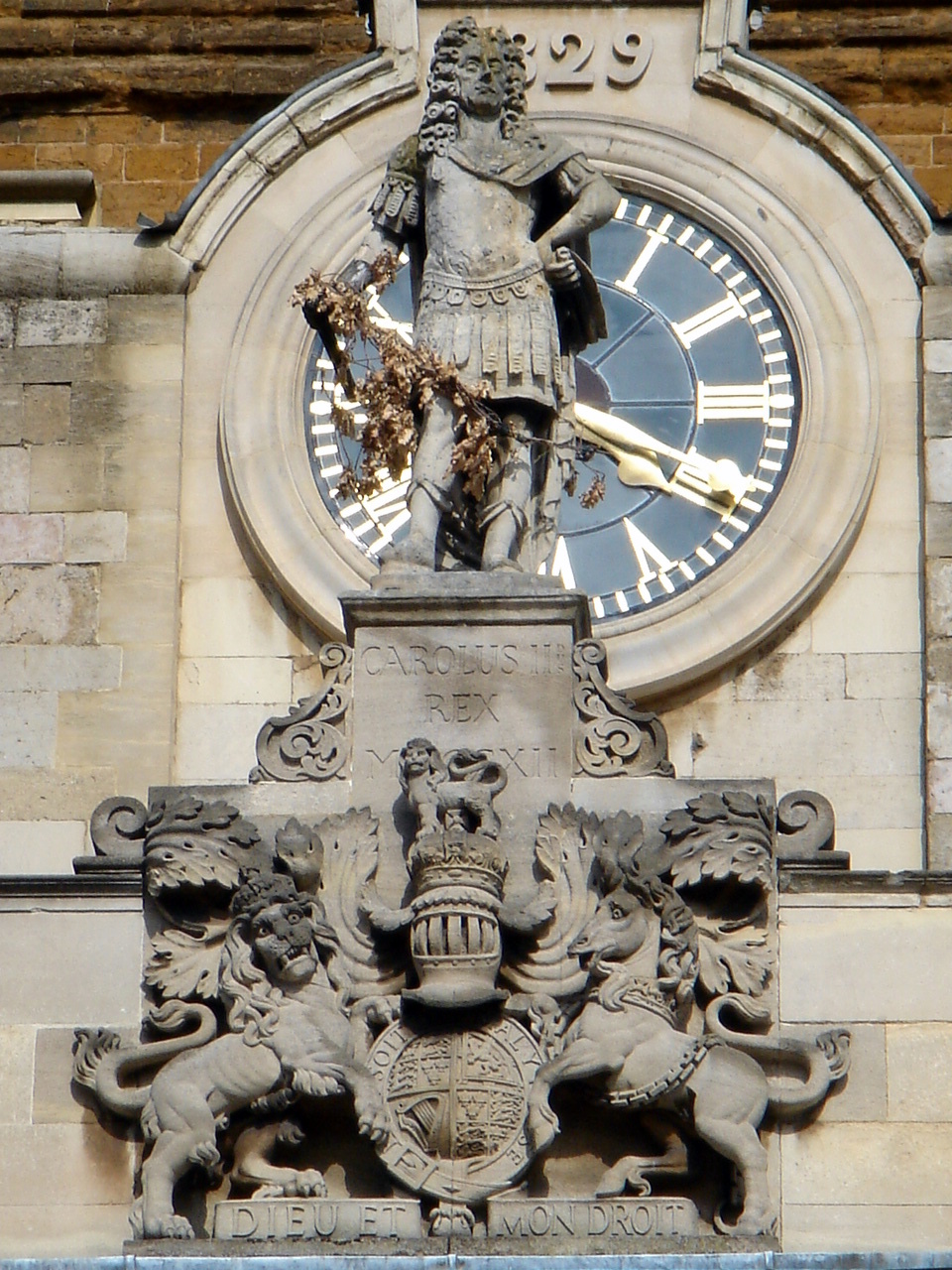
Statue of Charles II at All Saints' Church, Northampton with a now-wilted oak branch

Events still take place at Upton-upon-Severn in Worcestershire, Marsh Gibbon in Buckinghamshire, Great Wishford in Wiltshire (when villagers gather wood in Grovely Wood), Aston-on-Clun in Shropshire and Membury in Devon. The day has been marked in the past by re-enactment activities at Moseley Old Hall, West Midlands, one of the houses where Charles II hid in 1651.

At Fownhope in Herefordshire the Heart of Oak Society organise an annual event, where members of the society gather at the local pub and march through the village holding flower and oak leaf decorated sticks, whilst following the society banner and a brass band. The march goes first to the church for a service, and then to houses who host refreshments. The Heart of Oak Society was previously a friendly society, but had to reform in 1989 to keep the tradition going. Although Oak Apple Day celebrations have decreased in popularity and knowledge, Fownhope has managed to keep the event going, increasing in popularity and turn-out every year.

At All Saints' Church, Northampton, a statue of Charles II is garlanded with oak leaves at noon every Oak Apple Day, followed by a celebration of the Holy Communion according to the Book of Common Prayer. The statue of Charles II by John Hunt was erected on the portico parapet of All Saints' Church in 1712 in thanksgiving for his part in the rebuilding of the church.

Oak Apple Day is also celebrated in the Cornish village of St Neot. The vicar leads a procession through the village, he is followed by the Tower Captain holding the Oak bough. A large number of the villagers follow walking to the Church. A story of the history of the event is told and then the vicar blesses the branch. The Tower Captain throws the old branch down from the top of the tower and a new one is hauled to the top. Everyone is then invited to the vicarage gardens for refreshments and a barbecue. Up to 12 noon villagers wear a sprig of "red" (new) oak and in the afternoon wear a sprig of "Boys Love" (Artemisia abrotanum); tradition dictates that the punishment for not doing this results in being stung by nettles.

In 2021, Oak Apple Day was celebrated at Eton Wick within sight of Charles II's former home of Windsor Castle.

== See also ==
- Push penny
- Saint George's Day in England

== Bibliography ==
- Browning, Andrew (1995). English Historical Documents. Volume 6: 1660–1714 (2nd ed.). Abingdon-on-Thames, England: Routledge. ISBN 978-0-415-14371-4.
- Chambers, Robert (1879). The Book of Days: A Miscellany of Popular Antiquities in Connection with the Calendar. Vol. 1. Edinburgh: W. & R. Chambers.
- Drake-Carnell, F. J. (1938). Old English Customs and Ceremonies. New York: Charles Scribner's Sons.
- Hole, Christina (1978). A Dictionary of British Folk Customs. London: Paladin Granada. ISBN 978-0-586-08293-5.
- House of Commons Journal. Volume 8: 30 May 1660. London: His Majesty's Stationery Office. 1802 – via British History Online.
- Vickery, Roy (2010). Garlands, Conkers and Mother-Die: British and Irish Plant-Lore. London: Continuum. ISBN 978-1-4411-0195-2.
- Watts, D. C. (2007). Dictionary of Plant Lore. Cambridge, Massachusetts: Academic Press. ISBN 978-0-080-54602-5.
