= Usury =

Loans with unfairly high interest rate

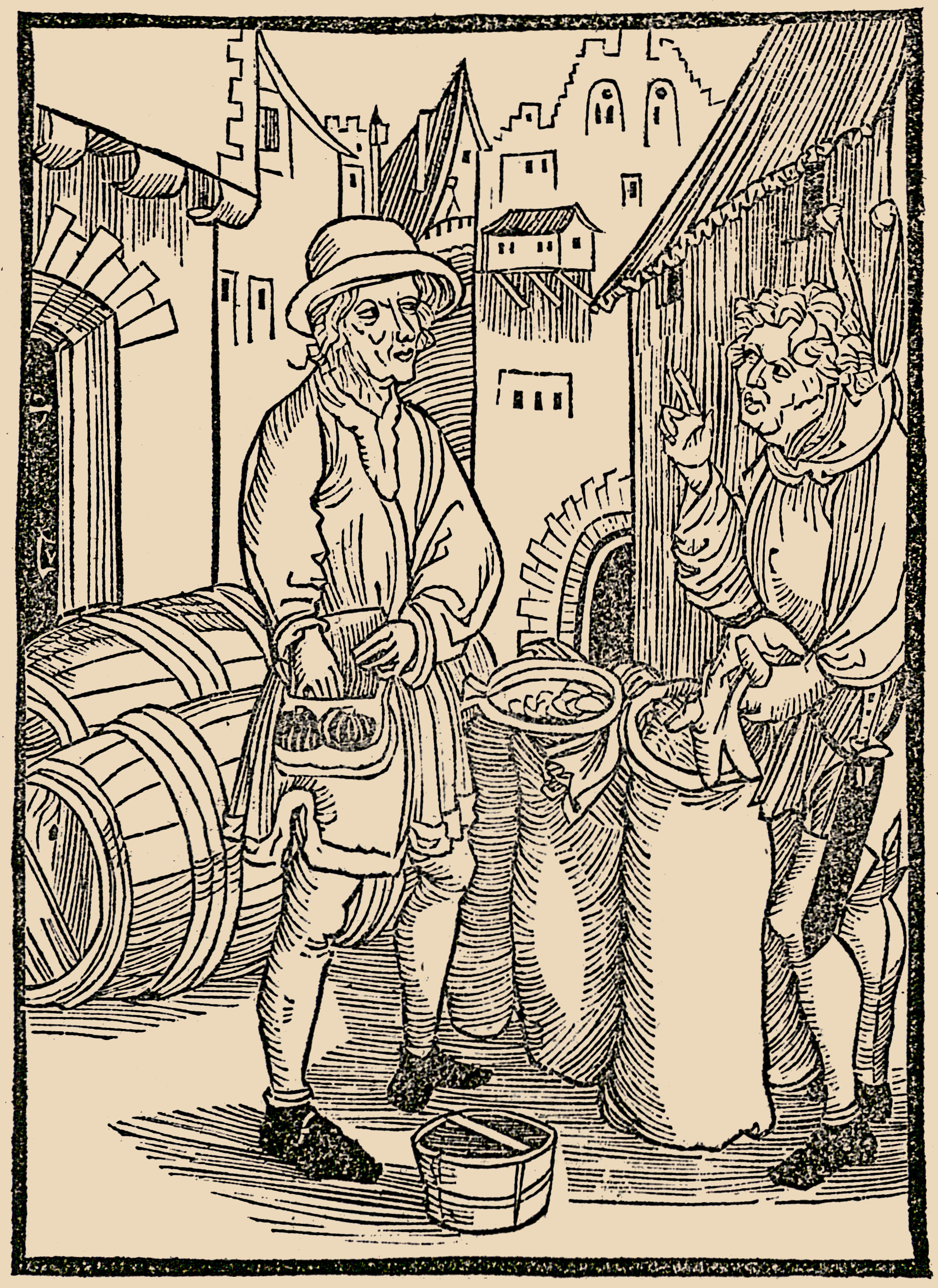
Of Usury, from Brant's Stultifera Navis (Ship of Fools), 1494; woodcut attributed to Albrecht Dürer

Usury (/ˈjuːʒəri/) is the practice of making loans that are seen as unfairly enriching the lender. The term may be used in a moral sense—condemning taking advantage of others' misfortunes—or in a legal sense, where an interest rate is charged in excess of the maximum rate that is allowed by law. A loan may be considered usurious because of excessive or abusive interest rates or other factors defined by the laws of a state. Someone who practises usury can be called a usurer, but in modern colloquial English may be called a loan shark.

In many historical societies including ancient Christian, Jewish, and Islamic societies, usury meant the charging of interest of any kind, and was considered wrong, or was made illegal. During the Sutra period in India (7th to 2nd centuries BC), there were laws prohibiting the highest castes from practising usury. Similar condemnations are found in religious texts from Buddhism, Judaism (ribbit in Hebrew), Christianity, and Islam (riba in Arabic). At times, many states from ancient Greece to ancient Rome have outlawed loans with any interest. Though the Roman Empire eventually allowed loans with carefully restricted interest rates, the Catholic Church in medieval Europe, as well as the Reformed Churches, regarded the charging of interest at any rate as sinful (as well as charging a fee for the use of money, such as at a bureau de change). Christian religious prohibitions on usury are predicated upon the belief that charging interest on a loan is a sin.

== History ==
Usury (in the original sense of any interest) was denounced by religious leaders and philosophers in the ancient world, including Moses, Plato, Aristotle, Cato, Cicero, Seneca, Aquinas, Gautama Buddha and Muhammad.

Certain negative historical renditions of usury carry with them social connotations of perceived "unjust" or "discriminatory" lending practices. The historian Paul Johnson comments:

Most early religious systems in the ancient Near East, and the secular codes arising from them, did not forbid usury. These societies regarded inanimate matter as alive, like plants, animals and people, and capable of reproducing itself. Hence if you lent 'food money', or monetary tokens of any kind, it was legitimate to charge interest. Food money in the shape of olives, dates, seeds or animals was lent out as early as c. 5000 BC, if not earlier. ...Among the Mesopotamians, Hittites, Phoenicians and Egyptians, interest was legal and often fixed by the state. But the Hebrew took a different view of the matter.

Theological historian John Noonan argues that "the doctrine [of usury] was enunciated by popes, expressed by three ecumenical councils, proclaimed by bishops, and taught unanimously by theologians."

=== Roman Empire ===
During the Principate period, most banking activities were conducted by private individuals who operated as large banking firms do today. Anybody that had any available liquid assets and wished to lend it out could easily do so.

The annual rates of interest on loans varied in the range of 4–12 percent, but when the interest rate was higher, it typically was not 15–16 percent but either 24 percent or 48 percent. They quoted them on a monthly basis, and the most common rates were multiples of twelve. Monthly rates tended to range from simple fractions to 3–4 percent, perhaps because lenders used Roman numerals.

During this period, moneylending primarily involved private loans given to individuals who were consistently in debt or temporarily so until harvest time. This practice was typically carried out by extremely wealthy individuals willing to take on high risks if the potential profit seemed promising. Interest rates were set privately and were largely unrestricted by law. Investment was always regarded as a matter of seeking personal profit, often on a large scale. Banking was of the small, back-street variety, run by the urban lower-middle class of petty shopkeepers. By the 3rd century, acute currency problems in the Empire drove such banking into decline. The rich who were in a position to take advantage of the situation became the moneylenders when the increasing tax demands in the last declining days of the Empire crippled and eventually destroyed the peasant class by reducing tenant-farmers to serfs. It was evident that usury meant exploitation of the poor.

Cicero, in the second book of his treatise De Officiis, relates the following conversation between an unnamed questioner and Cato:

...of whom, when inquiry was made, what was the best policy in the management of one's property, he answered "Good grazing." "What was next?" "Tolerable grazing." "What third?" "Bad grazing." "What fourth?" "Tilling." And when he who had interrogated him inquired, "What do you think of lending at usury?" Then Cato answered, "What do you think of murder?"

=== England ===
Usury Act 1487
- Act of Parliament
- Parliament of England
- Long title: An Acte agaynst Exchaunge and Rechaunge without the Kyngs Lycence.
- Citation: 3 Hen. 7. c. 5
- Territorial extent: England and Wales; Ireland

Dates
- Royal assent: 9 November 1487
- Commencement: 9 November 1487
- Repealed: 14 October 1459
Other legislation
Repealed by	Usury Act 1495
Relates to	Usury Act 1545; Usury Laws Repeal Act 1854

Status: Repealed

Text of statute as originally enacted

Usury Act 1495
- Act of Parliament
- Parliament of England
- Long title: An Acte agaynst Usurye.
- Citation: 11 Hen. 7. c. 8
- Territorial extent: England and Wales; Ireland

Dates
- Royal assent: 22 December 1495
- Commencement: 14 October 1495
- Repealed: England and Wales: 28 July 1863; Ireland: 10 August 1872
Other legislation
Repeals/revokes	Usury Act 1487
Amended by	Usury Act 1545
Repealed by	England and Wales: Statute Law Revision Act 1863; Ireland: Statute Law (Ireland) Revision Act 1872
Relates to	Usury Laws Repeal Act 1854

Status: Repealed

Text of statute as originally enacted

Usury Act 1545
- Act of Parliament
- Parliament of England
- Long title: An Act Against Usurie.
- Citation: 37 Hen. 8. c. 9
- Territorial extent: England and Wales

Dates
- Royal assent: 24 December 1545
- Commencement: 23 November 1545
- Repealed: 10 August 154
Other legislation
Amends	Usury Act 1495
Repealed by	Usury Laws Repeal Act 1854
Relates to	Usury Act 1487; Usury Act 1623; Usury Act 1660

Status: Repealed

Text of statute as originally enacted

In England, the departing Crusaders were joined by crowds of debtors in the massacres of Jews at London and York in 1189–1190. In 1275, Edward I of England passed the Statute of the Jewry which made usury illegal and linked it to blasphemy, in order to seize the assets of the violators. Scores of English Jews were arrested, 300 were hanged and their property went to the Crown. In 1290, all Jews were to be expelled from England, allowed to take only what they could carry; the rest of their property became the Crown's. Usury was cited as the official reason for the Edict of Expulsion; however, not all Jews were expelled: it was easy to avoid expulsion by converting to Christianity. Many other crowned heads of Europe expelled Jewish people, although again converts to Christianity were no longer considered Jewish. Many of these forced converts still secretly practised their faith.

The growth of the Lombard bankers and pawnbrokers, who moved from city to city, was along the pilgrim routes.

Die Wucherfrage is the title of a Lutheran Church–Missouri Synod work against usury from 1869. Usury is condemned in 19th-century Missouri Synod doctrinal statements.

In the 16th century, short-term interest rates dropped dramatically (from around 20–30% p.a. to around 9–10% p.a.). This was caused by refined commercial techniques, increased capital availability, the Reformation, and other reasons. The lower rates weakened religious scruples about lending at interest, although the debate did not cease altogether.

The 18th century papal prohibition on usury meant that it was a sin to charge interest on a money loan. As set forth by Thomas Aquinas in the 13th century, because money was invented to be an intermediary in exchange for goods, it is unjust to charge a fee to someone after giving them money. This is because transferring ownership of property implies the right to use that property for its purpose: "Accordingly if a man wanted to sell wine separately from the use of the wine, he would be selling the same thing twice, or he would be selling what does not exist, wherefore he would evidently commit a sin of injustice."

Charles Eisenstein has argued that pivotal change in the English-speaking world came with lawful rights to charge interest on lent money, particularly the 1545 act, "An Act Against Usurie" (37 Hen. 8. c. 9) of King Henry VIII of England.

== Religion ==
=== Judaism ===
The book of Deuteronomy prohibits Jews from charging interest except when making loans to foreigners. Typically, a loan is considered a form of Tzedakah or Ṣedaqah (Hebrew: צדקה [ts(e)daˈka]), a Hebrew word meaning "righteousness" but commonly used to signify charity. (This concept of "charity" differs from the modern Western understanding of "charity". The latter is typically understood as a spontaneous act of goodwill and a marker of generosity; tzedakah is an ethical obligation.) In the Rabbinic period, the practice of charging interest to non-Jews has been restricted to cases when there is no other means of subsistence. "If we nowadays allow interest to be taken from non-Jews, it is because there is no end to the yoke and the burden king and ministers impose on us, and everything we take is the minimum for our subsistence, and anyhow we are condemned to live in the midst of the nations and cannot earn our living in any other manner except by money dealings with them; therefore the taking of interest is not to be prohibited" (Tos. to BM 70b S.V. tashikh).

This is outlined in the Jewish scriptures, specifically in the Torah:

If thou lend money to any of My people, even to the poor with thee, thou shalt not be to him as a creditor; neither shall ye lay upon him interest.

Take thou no interest of him or increase; but fear thy God; that thy brother may live with thee. Thou shalt not give him thy money upon interest, nor give him thy victuals for increase.

Thou shalt not lend upon interest to thy brother: interest of money, interest of victuals, interest of any thing that is lent upon interest. Unto a foreigner thou mayest lend upon interest; but unto thy brother thou shalt not lend upon interest; that the LORD thy God may bless thee in all that thou puttest thy hand unto, in the land whither thou goest in to possess it.

that hath withdrawn his hand from the poor, that hath not received interest nor increase, hath executed Mine ordinances, hath walked in My statutes; he shall not die for the iniquity of his father, he shall surely live.

In thee have they taken gifts to shed blood; thou hast taken interest and increase, and thou hast greedily gained of thy neighbours by oppression, and hast forgotten Me, saith the Lord GOD.

Then I consulted with myself, and contended with the nobles and the rulers, and said unto them: 'Ye lend upon pledge, every one to his brother.' And I held a great assembly against them.

He that putteth not out his money on interest, nor taketh a bribe against the innocent. He that doeth these things shall never be moved.

Johnson contends that the Torah treats lending as philanthropy in a poor community whose aim was collective survival, but which is not obliged to be charitable towards outsiders.

A great deal of Jewish legal scholarship in the Early and High Middle Ages was devoted to making business dealings fair, honest and efficient.

As Jewish people were ostracized from most professions by local rulers during the Middle Ages, the Western churches and the guilds, they were pushed into marginal occupations considered socially inferior, such as tax and rent collecting and moneylending. Natural tensions between creditors and debtors were added to social, political, religious, and economic strains.

...financial oppression of Jews tended to occur in areas where they were most disliked, and if Jews reacted by concentrating on moneylending to non-Jews, the unpopularity—and so, of course, the pressure—would increase. Thus the Jews became an element in a vicious circle. The Christians, on the basis of the Biblical rulings, condemned interest-taking absolutely, and from 1179 those who practised it were excommunicated. Catholic autocrats frequently imposed the harshest financial burdens on the Jews. The Jews reacted by engaging in the one business where Christian laws actually discriminated in their favor, and became identified with the hated trade of moneylending.

Several historical rulings in Jewish law have mitigated the allowances for usury toward non-Jews. For instance, the 15th-century commentator Rabbi Isaac Abarbanel specified that the rubric for allowing interest does not apply to Christians or Muslims, because their faith systems have a common ethical basis originating from Judaism. The medieval commentator Rabbi David Kimhi extended this principle to non-Jews who show consideration for Jews, saying they should be treated with the same consideration when they borrow.

=== Christianity ===
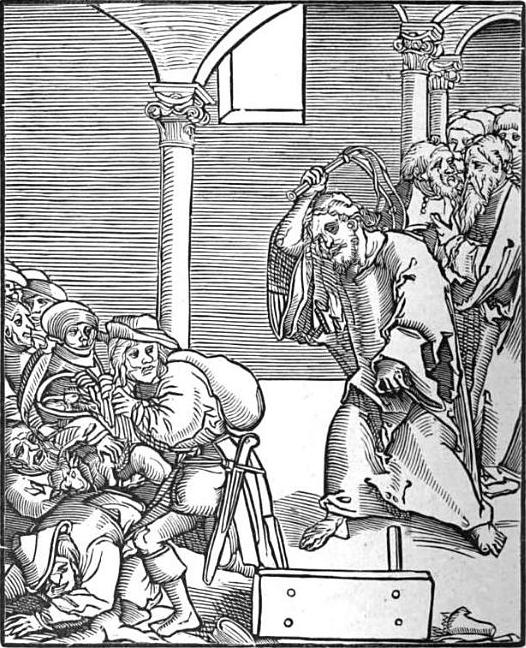
Christ Drives the Usurers Out of the Temple, a woodcut by Lucas Cranach the Elder in Passionary of Christ and Antichrist

==== Bible ====
The Old Testament "condemns the practice of charging interest on a poor person because a loan should be an act of compassion and taking care of one’s neighbor"; it teaches that "making a profit off a loan from a poor person is exploiting that person Exodus 22:25–27." Similarly, charging of interest (Hebrew: נֶֽשֶׁךְ, romanized: nešeḵ) or the taking of clothing as pledges is condemned in Ezekiel 18:8a(early 6th century Ezekiel and Deuteronomy 23:19 prohibits the taking of interest in Deuteronomy in the form of money or food when lending to a "brother".

The New Testament in Luke 6:34–36, likewise teaches giving rather than loaning money to those who need it: "And if you lend to those from whom you expect repayment, what credit is that to you? Even sinners lend to sinners, expecting to be repaid in full. But love your enemies, do good to them, and lend to them, expecting nothing in return. Then your reward will be great, and you will be sons of the Most High; for He is kind to the ungrateful and wicked. Be merciful, just as your Father is merciful."

==== Church councils ====
The First Council of Nicaea, in 325, forbade clergy from engaging in usury

Forasmuch as many enrolled among the Clergy, following covetousness and lust of gain, have forgotten the divine Scripture, which says, "He has not given his money upon usury" [Ezek. xviii, 8], and in lending money ask the hundredth of the sum [as monthly interest], the holy and great Synod thinks it just that if after this decree any one be found to receive usury, whether he accomplish it by secret transaction or otherwise, as by demanding the whole and one half, or by using any other contrivance whatever for filthy lucre's sake, he shall be deposed from the clergy and his name stricken from the list. (canon 17). [bracketed material in source]

At the time, usury was interest of any kind, and the canon forbade the clergy to lend money at interest rates even as low as 1 percent per year. Later ecumenical councils applied this regulation to the laity.

The Third Council of Lateran III decreed that persons who accepted interest on loans could receive neither the sacraments nor Christian burial.

Nearly everywhere the crime of usury has become so firmly rooted that many, omitting other business, practise usury as if it were permitted, and in no way observe how it is forbidden in both the Old and New Testament. We therefore declare that notorious usurers should not be admitted to communion of the altar or receive christian burial if they die in this sin. Whoever receives them or gives them christian burial should be compelled to give back what he has received, and let him remain suspended from the performance of his office until he has made satisfaction according to the judgment of his own bishop. (canon 25) [emphasis in source]

The Council of Vienne made the belief in the right to usury a heresy in 1311, and condemned all secular legislation that allowed it.

Serious suggestions have been made to us that communities in certain places, to the divine displeasure and injury of the neighbour, in violation of both divine and human law, approve of usury. By their statutes, sometimes confirmed by oath, they not only grant that usury may be demanded and paid, but deliberately compel debtors to pay it. By these statutes they impose heavy burdens on those claiming the return of usurious payments, employing also various pretexts and ingenious frauds to hinder the return. We, therefore, wishing to get rid of these pernicious practices, decree with the approval of the sacred council that all the magistrates, captains, rulers, consuls, judges, counsellors or any other officials of these communities who presume in the future to make, write or dictate such statutes, or knowingly decide that usury be paid or, if paid, that it be not fully and freely restored when claimed, incur the sentence of excommunication. They shall also incur the same sentence unless within three months they delete from the books of their communities, if they have the power, statutes of this kind hitherto published, or if they presume to observe in any way these statutes or customs. Furthermore, since money-lenders for the most part enter into usurious contracts so frequently with secrecy and guile that they can be convicted only with difficulty, we decree that they be compelled by ecclesiastical censure to open their account books, when there is question of usury. If indeed someone has fallen into the error of presuming to affirm pertinaciously that the practice of usury is not sinful, we decree that he is to be punished as a heretic; and we strictly enjoin on local ordinaries and inquisitors of heresy to proceed against those they find suspect of such error as they would against those suspected of heresy. (canon 29)

Up to the 16th century, usury was condemned by the Catholic Church. During the Fifth Lateran Council, in the 10th session (in the year 1515), the Council for the first time gave a definition of usury:

For, that is the real meaning of usury: when, from its use, a thing which produces nothing is applied to the acquiring of gain and profit without any work, any expense or any risk.

The Fifth Lateran Council, in the same declaration, gave explicit approval of charging a fee for services so long as no profit was made in the case of Mounts of Piety:

(...) We declare and define, with the approval of the Sacred Council, that the above-mentioned credit organisations, established by states and hitherto approved and confirmed by the authority of the Apostolic See, do not introduce any kind of evil or provide any incentive to sin if they receive, in addition to the capital, a moderate sum for their expenses and by way of compensation, provided it is intended exclusively to defray the expenses of those employed and of other things pertaining (as mentioned) to the upkeep of the organizations, and provided that no profit is made therefrom. They ought not, indeed, to be condemned in any way. Rather, such a type of lending is meritorious and should be praised and approved. It certainly should not be considered as usurious; (...)

Pope Sixtus V condemned the practice of charging interest as "detestable to God and man, damned by the sacred canons, and contrary to Christian charity.

==== Medieval theology ====
The first of the scholastic Christian theologians, Saint Anselm of Canterbury, led the shift in thought that labelled charging interest the same as theft. Previously usury had been seen as a lack of charity.

St. Thomas Aquinas, the leading scholastic theologian of the Catholic Church, argued charging of interest is wrong because it amounts to "double charging", charging for both the thing and the use of the thing. Aquinas said this would be morally wrong in the same way as if one sold a bottle of wine, charged for the bottle of wine, and then charged for the person using the wine to actually drink it. Similarly, one cannot charge for a piece of cake and for the eating of the piece of cake. Yet this, said Aquinas, is what usury does. Money is a medium of exchange, and is used up when it is spent. To charge for the money and for its use (by spending) is therefore to charge for the money twice. It is also to sell time since the usurer charges, in effect, for the time that the money is in the hands of the borrower. Time, however, is not a commodity for which anyone can charge. In condemning usury Aquinas was much influenced by the recently rediscovered philosophical writings of Aristotle and his desire to assimilate Greek philosophy with Christian theology. Aquinas argued that in the case of usury, as in other aspects of Christian revelation, Christian doctrine is reinforced by Aristotelian natural law rationalism. Aristotle's argument is that interest is unnatural, since money, as a sterile element, cannot naturally reproduce itself. Thus, usury conflicts with natural law just as it offends Christian revelation: see Thought of Thomas Aquinas. As such, Aquinas taught "that interest is inherently unjust and one who charges interest sins."

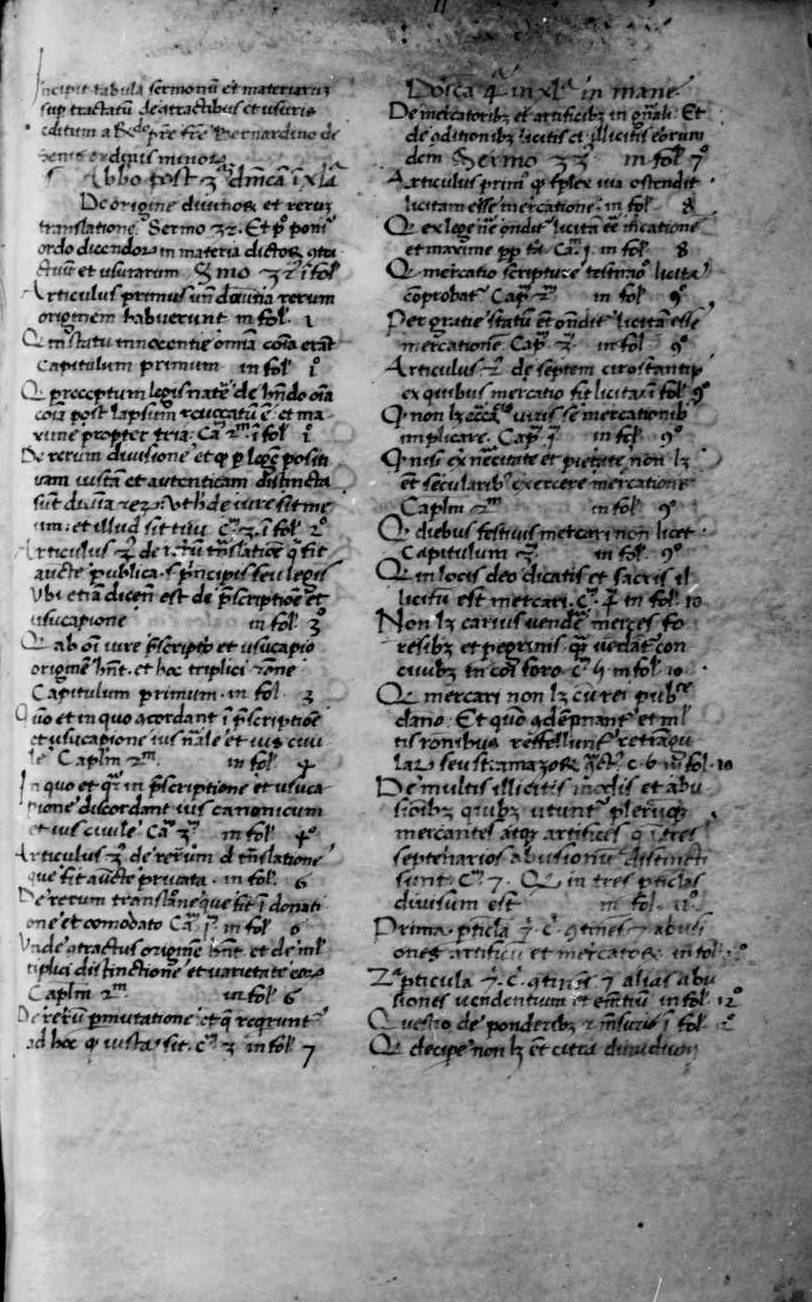
St. Bernardino of Siena, treatise on contracts and usury (Tractatus de contractis et usuris), manuscript, 15th century

Outlawing usury did not prevent investment, but stipulated that in order for the investor to share in the profit he must share the risk. In short he must be a joint-venturer. Simply to invest the money and expect it to be returned regardless of the success of the venture was to make money simply by having money and not by taking any risk or by doing any work or by any effort or sacrifice at all, which is usury. St Thomas quotes Aristotle as saying that "to live by usury is exceedingly unnatural". St Thomas allows, however, charges for actual services provided. Thus a banker or credit-lender could charge for such actual work or effort as he did carry out e.g. any fair administrative charges. The Catholic Church, in a decree of the Fifth Council of the Lateran, expressly allowed such charges in respect of credit-unions run for the benefit of the poor known as "montes pietatis".

In the 13th century, Cardinal Hostiensis enumerated thirteen situations in which charging interest was not immoral. The most important of these was lucrum cessans (profits given up) which allowed for the lender to charge interest "to compensate him for profit foregone in investing the money himself." This idea is very similar to opportunity cost. Many scholastic thinkers who argued for a ban on interest charges also argued for the legitimacy of lucrum cessans profits (e.g. Pierre Jean Olivi and St. Bernardino of Siena). However, Hostiensis' exceptions, including for lucrum cessans, were never accepted as official by the Catholic Church.

Pope Benedict XIV's encyclical Vix Pervenit (1745), gives the reasons why usury is sinful:

The nature of the sin called usury has its proper place and origin in a loan contract... [which] demands, by its very nature, that one return to another only as much as he has received. The sin rests on the fact that sometimes the creditor desires more than he has given..., but any gain which exceeds the amount he gave is illicit and usurious.

One cannot condone the sin of usury by arguing that the gain is not great or excessive, but rather moderate or small; neither can it be condoned by arguing that the borrower is rich; nor even by arguing that the money borrowed is not left idle, but is spent usefully...

==== 15th through 19th century ====
Martin Luther opposed several forms of usury, publishing and republishing multiple treatises on the subject. Christians, Luther argued, should not act in self-defense, should give when asked, and in the lowest degree should lend, expecting nothing in return. On those grounds, making a loan with anticipated profits (and with required repayment and hence little risk for the lender) is a form of self-service that goes against love of neighbor. Defining "lend" as lending without interest or fee, Luther encourages lending for the purpose of aiding the borrower.

In the 15th and 16th centuries, several members of the Dominican-dominated School of Salamanca wrote against usury, despite the liberal currents of the later parts of the movement.

The Westminster Larger Catechism, part of the Westminster Standards held as doctrinal documents by Presbyterian churches, teaches that usury is a sin prohibited by the eighth commandment.

Concerns about usury included the 19th century Rothschild loans to the Holy See and 16th century concerns over abuse of the zinskauf clause. This was problematic because the charging of interest (although not all interest – see above for Fifth Lateran Council) can be argued to be a violation of doctrine at the time, such as that reflected in the 1745 encyclical Vix pervenit. To prevent any claims of doctrine violation, work-arounds would sometimes be employed. For example, in the 15th century, the Medici Bank lent money to the Vatican, which was lax about repayment. Rather than charging interest, "the Medici overcharged the pope on the silks and brocades, the jewels and other commodities they supplied."

==== 20th century ====
The 1917 Code of Canon Law instructed church administrators to set aside funds to be "invested profitably". It permitted lending with interest under normal legal conditions as long as excessive interest was not charged.

§1543: If a fungible thing is given to another so that it becomes his, and later it must be restored in the same sort, no profit can by made by reason of the contract; but in the loan of a fungible thing, it is not by itself illicit to reap a legal profit, unless it can be shown to be immoderate of itself, and even greater profit [can be made] if there is a just and proportionate title so supporting.

The Catholic Church has always condemned usury, but in modern times, with the rise of capitalism, the previous assumptions about the very nature of money have been challenged, and the Church had to update its understanding of what constitutes usury to also include the new reality. Thus, the Church refers, among other things, to the fact Mosaic Law does not ban all interest taking (proving interest-taking is not an inherently immoral act, same principle as with homicide), as well as the prevalence of bonds and loans paying interest. Because of this, as the old Catholic Encyclopedia put it, "Since the possession of an object is generally useful, I may require the price of that general utility, even when the object is of no use to me."

Jesuit philosopher Joseph Rickaby, writing at the beginning of the 20th century, put the development of economy in relation to usury this way:

In great cities commerce rapidly ripened, and was well on towards maturity five centuries ago. Then the conditions that render interest lawful, and mark if off from usury, readily came to obtain. But those centres were isolated. (...) Here you might have a great city, Hamburg or Genoa, an early type of commercial enterprise, and, fifty miles inland, society was in infancy, and the great city was as part of another world. Hence the same transaction, as described by the letter of the law, might mean lawful interest in the city, and usury out in the country – the two were so disconnected.

He further gave the following view of the development of Catholic practice:

In such a situation the legislator has to choose between forbidding interest here and allowing usury there; between restraining speculation and licensing oppression. The mediaeval legislator chose the former alternative. Church and State together enacted a number of laws to restrain the taking of interest, laws that, like the clothes of infancy, are not to be scorned as absurd restrictions, merely because they are inapplicable now, and would not fit the modern growth of nations. At this day the State has repealed those laws, and the Church has officially signified that she no longer insists on them. Still she maintains dogmatically that there is such a sin as usury, and what it is, as defined in the Fifth Council of Lateran.

==== Modern era ====
The Congregation of the Missionary Sons of the Immaculate Heart of Mary, a Catholic Christian religious order, teaches that the charging of interest is sinful. Theology professor Kevin Considine argues that usury remains a sin if it takes advantage of the needy or where the source of the interest is sinful:

It might initially seem like little is at stake when it comes to interest, but this is an issue of human dignity. A person is made in God's own image and therefore may never be treated as a thing. Interest can diminish the human person to a thing to be manipulated for money. In an article for The Catholic Worker, Dorothy Day articulated this well: "Can I talk about the people living off usury ... not knowing the way that their infertile money has bred more money by wise investment in God knows what devilish nerve gas, drugs, napalm, missiles, or vanities, when housing and employment ... for the poor were needed, and money could have been invested there?" Her thoughts were a precursor to what Pope Francis now calls an "economy that kills." To sin is to say "no" to God and God's presence by harming others, ourselves, or all of creation. Charging interest is indeed sinful when doing so takes advantage of a person in need as well as when it means investing in corporations involved in the harming of God's creatures.

=== Islam ===
The practice of usury (translated from Arabic riba) is not allowed in Islamic teachings.

The exact definition of riba or usury in the modern times is disputed amongst Muslims.

One of the definitions of riba is usurious, or excessively high rates, of interest. The implication being conventional loans with market rates of interest are permitted according to the teachings of the Quran. Interest-bearing loans are legal and contractually enforceable in all Muslim countries.

The following quotations are English translations from the Qur'an:

Those who swallow usury cannot rise up save as he ariseth whom the devil hath prostrated by (his) touch. That is because they say: Trade is just like usury; whereas Allah permitteth trading and forbiddeth usury. He unto whom an admonition from his Lord cometh, and (he) refraineth (in obedience thereto), he shall keep (the profits of) that which is past, and his affair (henceforth) is with Allah. As for him who returneth (to usury) - Such are rightful owners of the Fire. They will abide therein.Surah Al-Baqara 2:275 ^{-Pickthall}

Allah hath blighted usury and made almsgiving fruitful. Allah loveth not the impious and guilty. Lo! those who believe and do good works and establish worship and pay the poor-due, their reward is with their Lord and there shall no fear come upon them neither shall they grieve. O ye who believe! Observe your duty to Allah, and give up what remaineth (due to you) from usury, if ye are (in truth) believers. And if ye do not, then be warned of war (against you) from Allah and His messenger. And if ye repent, then ye have your principal. Wrong not, and ye shall not be wronged. Surah Al-Baqara 2:276-280 ^{-Pickthall}

O ye who believe! Devour not usury, doubling and quadrupling (the sum lent). Observe your duty to Allah, that ye may be successful.Surah Al Imran 3:130 ^{-Pickthall}

Because of the wrongdoing of the Jews We forbade them good things which were (before) made lawful unto them, and because of their much hindering from Allah's way, And of their taking usury when they were forbidden it, and of their devouring people's wealth by false pretences, We have prepared for those of them who disbelieve a painful doom.Surah An-Nisa 4:160-161 ^{-Pickthall}

That which ye give in usury in order that it may increase on (other) people's property hath no increase with Allah; but that which ye give in charity, seeking Allah's Countenance, hath increase manifold.Surah Ar-Rum 30:39 ^{-Pickthall}

Islamic economics and finance were discussed and popularized in mid-20th century from which Islamic banking and investment industries originated. According to Islamic finance even a simple increase on a loan falls under the definition of riba. An example would be a person borrowing 1000 dollars and the borrower is required to return 1100 dollars. The above agreement is a form of transaction which is disallowed because lending and borrowing are meant to be social transactions aimed at helping others. Hence, a rule of thumb used by Islamic finance specialists is, "Every loan (qardh) which gives additional benefits is usury." As such, specialized codes of banking have developed to cater to investors wishing to obey this interpretation of usury. (See Islamic banking)

The criticism of Islamic banking and finance is that it closely replicates conventional finance and interest-bearing financial products. One of the major criticism is that Islamic financial products charge more interest compared to conventional financial products.

== In literature ==
In The Divine Comedy, Dante places the usurers in the inner ring of the seventh circle of hell.

Interest on loans, and the contrasting views on the morality of that practice held by Jews and Christians, is central to the plot of Shakespeare's play The Merchant of Venice. Antonio is the merchant of the title, a Christian, who is forced by circumstance to borrow money from Shylock, a Jew. Shylock customarily charges interest on loans, seeing it as good business, while Antonio does not, viewing it as morally wrong. When Antonio defaults on his loan, Shylock famously demands the agreed upon penalty: a measured quantity of muscle from Antonio's chest. This is the source of the metaphorical phrase "a pound of flesh" often used to describe the dear price of a loan or business transaction. Shakespeare's play is a vivid portrait of the competing views of loans and use of interest, as well as the cultural strife between Jews and Christians that overlaps it.

By the 18th century, usury was more often treated as a metaphor than a crime in itself, so Jeremy Bentham's Defence of Usury was not as shocking as it would have appeared two centuries earlier.

In Honoré de Balzac's 1830 novel Gobseck, the title character, who is a usurer, is described as both "petty and great – a miser and a philosopher..." The character Daniel Quilp in The Old Curiosity Shop by Charles Dickens is a usurer.

In the early 20th century, Ezra Pound's anti-usury poetry was not primarily based on the moral injustice of interest payments but on the fact that excess capital was no longer devoted to artistic patronage, as it could now be used for capitalist business investment.

== Usury law ==
=== England ===
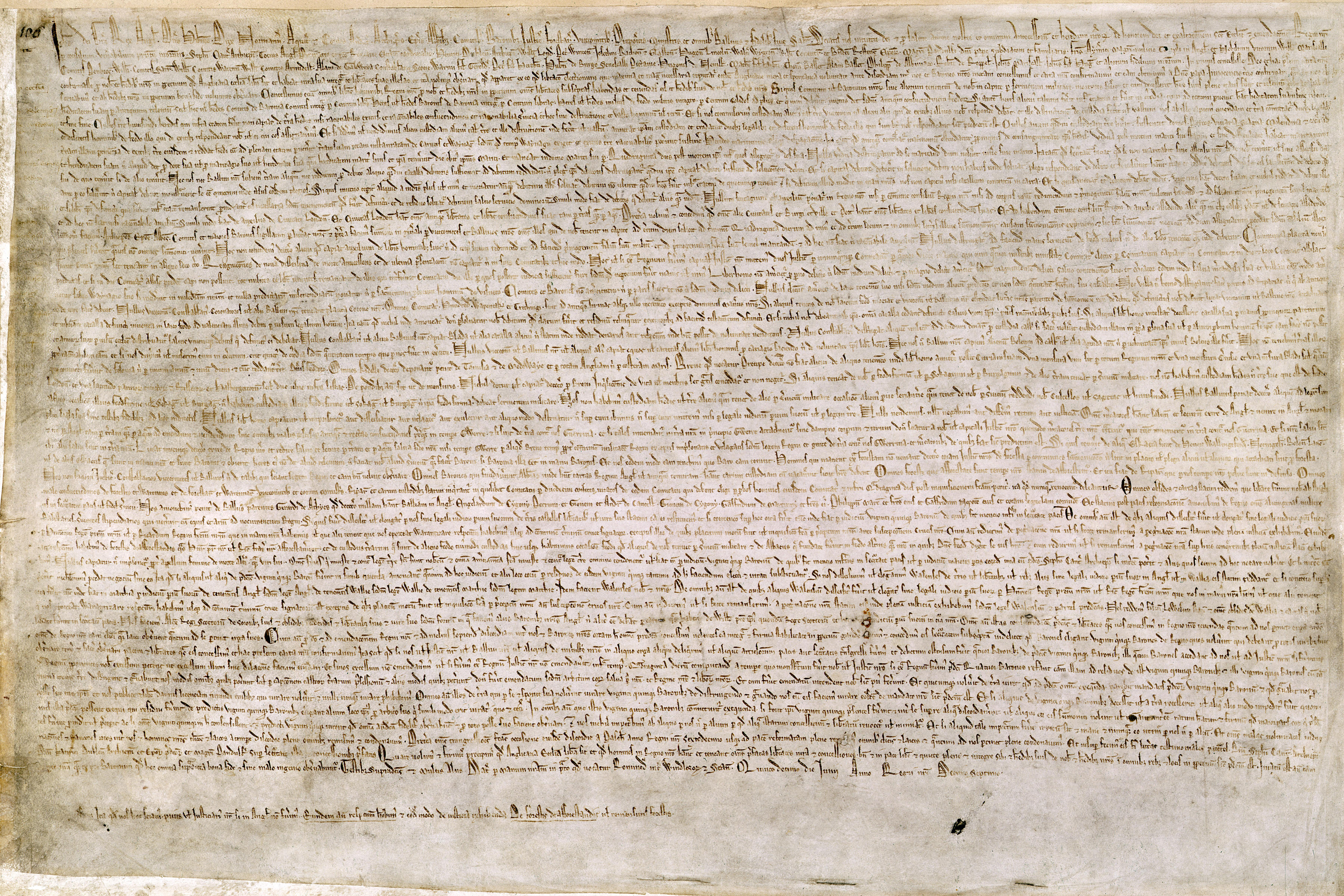
Magna Carta commands, "If any one has taken anything, whether much or little, by way of loan from Jews, and if he dies before that debt is paid, the debt shall not carry usury so long as the heir is under age, from whomsoever he may hold. And if that debt falls into our hands, we will take only the principal contained in the note."

"When money is lent on a contract to receive not only the principal sum again, but also an increase by way of compensation for the use, the increase is called interest by those who think it lawful, and usury by those who do not." (William Blackstone's Commentaries on the Laws of England).

=== Canada ===
On the federal level, Canada's Criminal Code limits the interest rate to 35% per year. The law is broadly written and Canada's courts have often intervened to remove ambiguity. In Quebec, the maximum annual interest rate allowed by law is 35%.

=== Hong Kong ===
The Money Lenders Ordinance (Cap. 163) prohibits lending at an effective interest rate beyond 48% unless exempted. Offenders are liable "on summary conviction to a fine of $500,000 and to imprisonment for 2 years", or "on conviction on indictment to a fine of $5,000,000 and to imprisonment for 10 years".

=== Japan ===
Japan has various laws restricting interest rates. Under civil law, the maximum interest rate is between 15% and 20% per year depending upon the principal amount (larger amounts having a lower maximum rate). Interest in excess of 20% is subject to criminal penalties (the criminal law maximum was 29.2% until it was lowered by legislation in 2010). Default interest on late payments may be charged at up to 1.46 times the ordinary maximum (i.e., 21.9% to 29.2%), while pawn shops may charge interest of up to 9% per month (i.e., 108% per year, however, if the loan extends more than the normal short-term pawn shop loan, the 9% per month rate compounded can make the annual rate in excess of 180%, before then most of these transaction would result in any goods pawned being forfeited).

=== United States ===
State laws specify the maximum legal interest rate at which loans can be made. In the United States, the primary legal power to regulate usury rests primarily with the states. Each U.S. state has its own statute that dictates how much interest can be charged before it is considered usurious or unlawful.

If a lender charges above the lawful interest rate, a court will not allow the lender to sue to recover the unlawfully high interest, and some states will apply all payments made on the debt to the principal balance. In some states, such as New York, usurious loans are voided ab initio.

The making of usurious loans is often called loan sharking. That term is sometimes also applied to the practice of making consumer loans without a license in jurisdictions that requires lenders to be licensed.

==== Federal regulation ====
On a federal level, Congress has never attempted to federally regulate interest rates on purely private transactions, but on the basis of past U.S. Supreme Court decisions, arguably the U.S. Congress might have the power to do so under the interstate Commerce Clause of Article I of the Constitution.

Congress imposed a federal criminal penalty for unlawful interest rates through the Racketeer Influenced and Corrupt Organizations Act (RICO Statute), and its definition of "unlawful debt", which makes it a potential federal felony to lend money at an interest rate more than twice the local state usury rate and then try to collect that debt.

It is a federal offense to use violence or threats to collect usurious interest (or any other sort).

Separate federal rules apply to most banks. The U.S. Supreme Court held unanimously in the 1978 case, Marquette Nat. Bank of Minneapolis v. First of Omaha Service Corp., that the National Banking Act of 1863 allowed nationally chartered banks to charge the legal rate of interest in their state regardless of the borrower's state of residence.

In 1980, Congress passed the Depository Institutions Deregulation and Monetary Control Act. Among the Act's provisions, it exempted federally chartered savings banks, installment plan sellers and chartered loan companies from state usury limits. Combined with the Marquette decision that applied to National Banks, this effectively overrode all state and local usury laws. The 1968 Truth in Lending Act does not regulate rates, except for some mortgages, but requires uniform or standardized disclosure of costs and charges.

In the 1996 Smiley v. Citibank case, the Supreme Court further limited states' power to regulate credit card fees and extended the reach of the Marquette decision. The court held that the word "interest" used in the 1863 banking law included fees and, therefore, states could not regulate fees.

Some members of Congress have tried to create a federal usury statute that would limit the maximum allowable interest rate, but the measures have not progressed. In July 2010, the Dodd–Frank Wall Street Reform and Consumer Protection Act, was signed into law by President Obama. The act provides for a Consumer Financial Protection Bureau to regulate some credit practices but has no interest rate limit.

==== Texas ====
State law in Texas also includes a provision for contracting for, charging, or receiving charges exceeding twice the amount authorized (A/K/A "double usury"). A person who violates this provision is liable to the obligor as an additional penalty for all principal or principal balance, as well as interest or time price differential. A person who is liable is also liable for reasonable attorney's fees incurred by the obligor.

== Avoidance mechanisms and interest-free lending ==
=== Demurrage currency ===
Demurrage currency is a type of money that is designed to gradually lose purchasing power at a flat constant rate. The German economist, Silvio Gesell, advocated for demurrage as part of the Freiwirtschaft economic system. He referred to demurrage as Freigeld 'free money' — "free" because it would be freed from hoarding and interest. Gesell theorized that Freigeld would lead to fewer recessions by increasing the velocity of money, eliminating inflation, and creating an interest-free economy without usury.

=== Islamic banking ===
In a partnership or joint venture where money is lent, the creditor provides the capital and is guaranteed a fixed amount of profit. The debtor puts in time and effort, but bears the risk of loss. Some Islamic jurists argue that such practice is against the teachings of the religion. As an alternative to interest, they strongly encourage charity and direct investment in which the creditor shares whatever profit or loss the business may incur (in modern terms, this amounts to an equity stake in the business).

=== Interest-free micro-lending ===
Growth of the Internet internationally has enabled both commercial micro-lending (through sites such as Kickstarter – launched in 2009) and global micro-lending charities (where lenders make small sums of money available on zero-interest terms). Persons lending money to on-line micro-lending charity Kiva (founded in 2005), for example, do not get paid any interest, although Kiva's partners in the country where the loan is used may charge interest to the end-users to whom the loans are made.

=== Non-recourse mortgages ===
A non-recourse loan is secured by the value of property (usually real estate) owned by the debtor. However, unlike other loans, which oblige the debtor to repay the amount borrowed, a non-recourse loan is fully satisfied merely by the transfer of the property to the creditor, even if the property has declined in value and is worth less than the amount borrowed. When such a loan is created, the creditor bears the risk that the property will decline sharply in value (in which case the creditor is repaid with property worth less than the amount borrowed), and the debtor does not bear the risk of decrease in property value (because the debtor is guaranteed the right to use the property, regardless of value, to satisfy the debt.)

=== Zinskauf ===
Zinskauf was a financial instrument, similar to an annuity, that rose to prominence in the Middle Ages. The decline of the Byzantine Empire led to a growth of capital in Europe, so the Catholic Church tolerated zinskauf as a way to avoid prohibitions on usury. Since zinskauf was an exchange of a fixed amount of money for annual income it was considered a sale rather than a loan. Martin Luther made zinskauf a subject of his Treatise on Usury and his Sermon on Trade and Usury and criticized clerics of the Catholic Church for violating the spirit if not the letter of usury laws.

== See also ==
- Chrematistics – Economics theory studying money
- Christian finance – Type of ethical finance following Christian ethic
- Contractum trinius – Set of contracts
- Debt-trap diplomacy – Diplomatic practice coercing alignment or access of an indebted country to its creditor
- Excess profits tax – Tax on monopoly profits
- Greed – Insatiable longing for material or immaterial gain; avarice
- History of banking – Development of banking institutions and practices from antiquity to the present
- History of pawnbroking – History of lending money on portable security
- Loansharking – Person who offers loans at extremely high interest rates
- Money changing – Person or organization that exchanges the currency of one country for that of another
- Payday loan – Short-term unsecured loan
- Predatory lending – Unethical lending practices
- Credit card interest – Interest charged to credit card users
- Title loan – Secured loan using borrower's vehicle title as collateral
- Usury Act 1660 – Act of the Parliament of England
