= Legal Proceedings During Commonwealth Act 1660 =

Act of the Parliament of England

- Act of Parliament
- Parliament of England
- Long title: An Act for Confirmation of Judiciall Proceedings.
- Citation: 12 Cha. 2. c. 12
- Territorial extent: England and Wales

Dates
- Royal assent: 29 August 1660
- Commencement: 25 April 1660 (Note: Start of session.)
- Repealed: 30 July 1948
Other legislation
Repealed by	Statute Law Revision Act 1948
Relates to	Indemnity and Oblivion Act 1660; Confirmation of Acts Act 1661; Legal Proceedings During Commonwealth Act 1661; Confirmation of Acts (No. 3) Act 1661; Legal Proceedings During Commonwealth Act 1662

Status: Repealed

Text of statute as originally enacted

Legal Proceedings During Commonwealth Act 1661
- Act of Parliament
- Parliament of England
- Long title: An Act declaring the Paines Penalties and Forfeitures imposed upon the Estates and Persons of certaine notorious Offenders excepted out of the Act of Free and Generall Pardon Indempnity and Oblivion.
- Citation: 13 Cha. 2 St. 1. c. 15
- Territorial extent: England and Wales

Dates
- Royal assent: 30 July 1661
- Commencement: 8 May 1661 (Note: Start of session.)
- Repealed: 30 July 1948
Other legislation
Repealed by	Statute Law Revision Act 1948
Relates to	Indemnity and Oblivion Act 1660; Legal Proceedings During Commonwealth Act 1660; Legal Proceedings During Commonwealth Act 1662

Status: Repealed

Text of statute as originally enacted

Legal Proceedings During Commonwealth Act 1662
- Act of Parliament
- Parliament of England
- Long title: An Act for the restoring of all such Advowsons Rectories Impropriate Gleeb Lands & Tithes to His Majesties Loyal Subjects as were taken from them and making void certain charges imposed on them upon theire Compositions for Delinquency by the late usurped Powers.
- Citation: 14 Cha. 2. c. 25 (Note: This is the citation in The Statutes of the Realm.); 13 & 14 Cha. 2. c. 25 (Note: This is the citation in The Statutes at Large.)
- Territorial extent: England and Wales

Dates
- Royal assent: 19 May 1662
- Commencement: 7 January 1662 (Note: Start of session.)
- Repealed: 30 July 1948
Other legislation
Repealed by	Statute Law Revision Act 1948
Relates to	Indemnity and Oblivion Act 1660; Legal Proceedings During Commonwealth Act 1661

Status: Repealed

Text of statute as originally enacted

The Legal Proceedings During Commonwealth Act 1660 or Act of the Confirmation of Judicial Proceedings (12 Cha. 2. c. 12) was an act of the Parliament of England passed to legitimise the outcome of judicial proceedings during the English interregnum.

== Background ==
The act was rendered necessary by the lack of a legitimate English government in control of the whole country since the outbreak of the Civil War. During the Civil War, there had been two rival governments. After the execution of Charles I in 1649, there had been a series of governments of which the longest enduring was that of Oliver Cromwell as Protector. Following his death and during the Protectorate of his son, the Rump Parliament was recalled, and prepared the way for new elections to a Convention Parliament, which invited back the king, Charles II. Upon his restoration, the previous regimes were regarded as "usurping powers", whose actions were void.

The first action of the Convention Parliament after the arrival of the king was to declare itself a legitimate Parliament, and to confirm its own ordinances continuing taxation. It then authorised subsisting the temporary continuance of legal proceedings, though begun by writs and so on using the titles of previous "usurping" rulers.

== The act ==
The first clause of the act confirmed all judicial proceedings since 1 May 1642, and additionally final concords made with novel procedures and those undertaken for the County Palatine of Durham at Westminster, rather than Durham.

There were several exceptions to this:

- All forfeitures for treason and attainders for adherence to Charles I were annulled.
- All sales of land by ordinance of "usurping powers" were left just as if the act had not passed (being neither avoided nor confirmed). This meant that the land reverted to its former owner or his heir, if he had done nothing to confirm the sale (but many had confirmed such sales, for payment).
- Recognisances and bonds to former rulers (if undischarged) remained in force to the king, unless entered into by order of former governing authorities.
- All sales of lands of the king, bishops and cathedrals were declared void (so that the lands reverted to their former owners).

The act ended by lamenting that it was "necessary to mention Diverse pretensed Acts and Ordinances" of the previous rulers and declaring their titles "most Rebellious, Wicked, Trayterous and Abominable Usurpations Detested by this present Parliament as opposite in the Highest Degree to His Sacred Majestyes most Just and undoubted Right to whom and to His Heires and Lawfull Successors the Imperiall Crownes" belonged.

This together with the Act of Oblivion (12 Cha. 2. c. 11) put an end to legal doubts over the events of the preceding period. However a further act, the Legal Proceedings During Commonwealth Act 1661 (13 Cha. 2. St. 1. c. 15), had to be passed the following year to deal with certain issues arising out the exclusion from the Act of Oblivion and from the attainder of the Regicides. It was then followed by Legal Proceedings During Commonwealth Act 1662 (14 Cha. 2. c. 25).

== Subsequent developments ==
The whole act was repealed by section 1 of, and the first schedule to, the Statute Law Revision Act 1948 (11 & 12 Geo. 6. c. 62), which came into force on 30 July 1948.
