= Push penny =

English custom

Push penny was a long-observed custom at Durham Cathedral in England which occurred three days in the year. During this tradition money was thrown into the crowd on the college-yard. The event occurred annually on 30 January, 29 May, and 5 November, respectively the anniversaries of King Charles' death, Oak Apple Day, and Guy Fawkes Night. They would throw out 20 shillings of copper to the people on the yard.

== History ==
It is unknown when the tradition began but it was stopped by the Reformation and was continued after the Stuart Restoration of Charles II. The Dean and Chapter of Durham were people who kept this tradition going over the years, but the custom was stopped again in the middle of the 19th century. It is unlikely that this tradition will come back.

== Influences ==
During the monastic period, roughly 300-600 people would gather by the Prior's Mansion and pennies were thrown out at them.

At Bishop Auckland the bishop would throw pennies on specific days of the year.
