= List of acts of the Parliament of England from 1660 =

This is a list of acts of the Parliament of England for the year 1660.

For acts passed during the period 1707–1800, see the list of acts of the Parliament of Great Britain. See also the list of acts of the Parliament of Scotland, and the list of acts of the Parliament of Ireland.

For acts passed from 1801 onwards, see the list of acts of the Parliament of the United Kingdom. For acts of the devolved parliaments and assemblies in the United Kingdom, see the list of acts of the Scottish Parliament, the list of acts of the Northern Ireland Assembly, and the list of acts and measures of Senedd Cymru; see also the list of acts of the Parliament of Northern Ireland.

For medieval statutes, etc. that are not considered to be acts of Parliament, see the list of English statutes.

See also the List of ordinances and acts of the Parliament of England, 1642–1660 for ordinances and acts passed by the Long Parliament and other bodies without royal assent, and which were not considered to be valid legislation following the Restoration in 1660.

The number shown after each act's title is its chapter number. Acts are cited using this number, preceded by the years of the reign during which the relevant parliamentary session was held; thus the Union with Ireland Act 1800 is cited as "39 & 40 Geo. 3. c. 67", meaning the 67th act passed during the session that started in the 39th year of the reign of George III and which finished in the 40th year of that reign. The modern convention is to use Arabic numerals in citations (thus "41 Geo. 3" rather than "41 Geo. III"). Acts of the last session of the Parliament of Great Britain and the first session of the Parliament of the United Kingdom are both cited as "41 Geo. 3".

Acts passed by the Parliament of England did not have a short title; however, some of these acts have subsequently been given a short title by acts of the Parliament of the United Kingdom, such as the Short Titles Act 1896 (59 & 60 Vict. c. 14).

Acts passed by the Parliament of England were deemed to have come into effect on the first day of the session in which they were passed. Because of this, the years given in the list below may in fact be the year before a particular act was passed.

== 12 Cha. 2 ==
The 1st Parliament of King Charles II (the 'Convention Parliament') which met from 25 April 1660 until 29 December 1660.

Note that although Charles II's reign began de facto with the Restoration in 1660, it was considered to have begun de jure in 1649 with the execution of Charles I; as such, these acts are the regnal year 12 Cha. 2.

This session was traditionally cited as 12 Car. 2, 12 Chas. 2 or 12 C. 2; it is listed in the "Chronological Table of the Statutes" as 12 Car. 2.

=== Public acts ===
| Short title | Citation | Royal assent |
Long title
| Parliament Act 1660 (repealed) | 12 Cha. 2. c. 1 | 1 June 1660 |
An Act for removing and preventing all Questions and Disputes concerning the Assembling and Sitting of this present Parliament. (Repealed by Statute Law (Repeals) Act 1969 (c. 52))
| Taxation Act 1660 (repealed) | 12 Cha. 2. c. 2 | 1 June 1660 |
An Act for putting in execution an Ordinance mentioned in this Act. (Repealed by Statute Law Revision Act 1863 (26 & 27 Vict. c. 125))
| Continuance of Process, etc. Act 1660 (repealed) | 12 Cha. 2. c. 3 | 1 June 1660 |
An Act for the Continuance of Processe and Judiciall Proceedings. (Repealed by Statute Law Revision Act 1863 (26 & 27 Vict. c. 125))
| Subsidy Act 1660 (repealed) | 12 Cha. 2. c. 4 | 28 July 1660 |
A Subsidy granted to the King of Tonnage and Poundage and other summes of Money payable upon Merchandize Exported and Imported. (Repealed by Customs Law Repeal Act 1825 (6 Geo. 4. c. 105))
| Excise Act 1660 (repealed) | 12 Cha. 2. c. 5 | 28 July 1660 |
An Act for continuing the Excise untill the twentyeth of August One thousand six hundred & sixty. (Repealed by Statute Law Revision Act 1863 (26 & 27 Vict. c. 125))
| Commissioners of Sewers Act 1660 (repealed) | 12 Cha. 2. c. 6 | 28 July 1660 |
An Act for the present Nominating of Commissioners of Sewers. (Repealed by Statute Law Revision Act 1863 (26 & 27 Vict. c. 125))
| Lord Ormond (Restoration of Lands, etc., in Ireland) Act 1660 (repealed) | 12 Cha. 2. c. 7 (Note: Also listed as 12 Cha. 2. c. 15 Pr.) | 28 July 1660 |
An Act for restoreing unto James Marquesse of Ormond all his Honours Mannours Land and Tenements in Ireland whereof he was in Possession on the twenty-third Day of October one thousand six hundred forty-one, or at any Time since. (Repealed by Statute Law (Repeals) Act 1977 (c. 18))
| Excise (No. 2) Act 1660 (repealed) | 12 Cha. 2. c. 8 | 18 August 1660 |
An Act for continuing of the Excise till the five and twentyeth day of December One thousand six hundred and sixty. (Repealed by Statute Law Revision Act 1863 (26 & 27 Vict. c. 125))
| Poll Tax Act 1660 (repealed) | 12 Cha. 2. c. 9 | 29 August 1660 |
An Act for the speedy provision of money for disbanding and paying off the forces of this Kingdome both by Land and Sea. (Repealed by Statute Law Revision Act 1863 (26 & 27 Vict. c. 125))
| Poll Tax (Amendment) Act 1660 (repealed) | 12 Cha. 2. c. 10 | 13 September 1660 |
An Act for supplying and explaining certaine defects in an Act entituled "An Act for the speedy provision of money for disbanding and paying off the forces of this kingdome both by Land and Sea." (Note: Poll Tax Act 1660 (12 Cha. 2. c. 9)) (Repealed by Statute Law Revision Act 1863 (26 & 27 Vict. c. 125))
| Indemnity and Oblivion Act 1660 (repealed) | 12 Cha. 2. c. 11 | 29 August 1660 |
An Act of Free and Generall Pardon, Indemnity, and Oblivion. (Repealed by Statute Law Revision Act 1948 (11 & 12 Geo. 6. c. 62))
| Legal Proceedings During Commonwealth Act 1660 (repealed) | 12 Cha. 2. c. 12 | 29 August 1660 |
An Act for Confirmation of Judiciall Proceedings. (Repealed by Statute Law Revision Act 1948 (11 & 12 Geo. 6. c. 62))
| Usury Act 1660 (repealed) | 12 Cha. 2. c. 13 | 29 August 1660 |
An Act for restraining the takeing of Excessive Usury. (Repealed by Usury Laws Repeal Act 1854 (17 & 18 Vict. c. 90))
| Observance of 29th May Act 1660 (repealed) | 12 Cha. 2. c. 14 | 29 August 1660 |
An Act for a Perpetuall Anniversary Thanksgiveing on the nine and twentieth day of May. (Repealed for England and Wales by Anniversary Days Observance Act 1859 (22 Vict. c. 2) and for the Isle of Man by Statute Law Revision (Isle of Man) Act 1991 (c. 61))
| Disbanding of the Army Act 1660 (repealed) | 12 Cha. 2. c. 15 | 13 September 1660 |
An Act for the speedy disbanding of the Army and Garrisons of this Kingdome. (Repealed by Statute Law Revision Act 1863 (26 & 27 Vict. c. 125))
| Disbanded Soldiers Act 1660 (repealed) | 12 Cha. 2. c. 16 | 13 September 1660 |
An Act for inabling the Souldiers of the Army now to be disbanded to exercise Trades. (Repealed by Statute Law Revision Act 1863 (26 & 27 Vict. c. 125))
| Restoring of Ministers Act 1660 (repealed) | 12 Cha. 2. c. 17 | 13 September 1660 |
An Act for the Confirming and Restoreing of Ministers. (Repealed by Statute Law Revision Act 1863 (26 & 27 Vict. c. 125))
| Navigation Act 1660 (repealed) | 12 Cha. 2. c. 18 | 13 September 1660 |
An Act for the Encourageing and increasing of Shipping and Navigation. (Repealed by Customs Law Repeal Act 1825 (6 Geo. 4. c. 105))
| Customs Act 1660 (repealed) | 12 Cha. 2. c. 19 | 13 September 1660 |
An Act to prevent Fraudes and Concealments of His Majestyes Customes and Subsidyes. (Repealed by Customs Law Repeal Act 1825 (6 Geo. 4. c. 105))
| Taxation (No. 2) Act 1660 (repealed) | 12 Cha. 2. c. 20 | 13 September 1660 |
An Act for raising seavenscore thousand pounds for the compleate disbanding of the whole Army and paying off some part of the Navy. (Repealed by Statute Law Revision Act 1863 (26 & 27 Vict. c. 125))
| Taxation (No. 3) Act 1660 (repealed) | 12 Cha. 2. c. 21 | 13 September 1660 |
An Act for the speedy raising of Seaventy thousand pounds for the present Supply of his Majestye. (Repealed by Statute Law Revision Act 1863 (26 & 27 Vict. c. 125))
| Bays Regulation (Colchester) Act 1660 (repealed) | 12 Cha. 2. c. 22 (Note: Also listed as 12 Cha. 2. c. 7 Pr.) | 13 September 1660 |
An Act for the Regulating of the Trade of Bay makeing (Note: Baize making.) in the Dutchy Bay Hall in Colchester. (Repealed by Statute Law Revision Act 1863 (26 & 27 Vict. c. 125))
| Excise (No. 3) Act 1660 (repealed) | 12 Cha. 2. c. 23 | 24 December 1660 |
A Grant of certaine Impositions upon Beere Ale and other Liquors for the encrease of His Majestyes Revenue during His Life. (Repealed by Statute Law Revision Act 1863 (26 & 27 Vict. c. 125))
| Tenures Abolition Act 1660 | 12 Cha. 2. c. 24 | 24 December 1660 |
An Act takeing away the Court of Wards and Liveries and Tenures in Capite and by Knights Service and Purveyance, and for setling a Revenue upon His Majesty in Lieu thereof.
| Wine Act 1660 (repealed) | 12 Cha. 2. c. 25 | 29 December 1660 |
An Act for the better Ordering the Selling of Wines by Retaile, and for preventing Abuses in the Mingling Corrupting and Vitiating of Wines, and for Setting and Limitting the Prices of the same. (Repealed by Statute Law Revision Act 1863 (26 & 27 Vict. c. 125))
| Taxation (No. 4) Act 1660 (repealed) | 12 Cha. 2. c. 26 | 29 December 1660 |
An Act for the levying of the Arreares of the twelve months Assessment commencing the 24th of June 1659, and the Six Months Assessment commencing the 25th of December 1659. (Repealed by Statute Law Revision Act 1863 (26 & 27 Vict. c. 125))
| Taxation (No. 5) Act 1660 (repealed) | 12 Cha. 2. c. 27 | 29 December 1660 |
An Act for granting unto the Kings Majestic Fower hundred and twenty thousand pounds by an Assessment of three score and ten thousand pounds by the moneth for six moneths for disbanding the remainder of the Army, and paying off the Navy. (Repealed by Statute Law Revision Act 1863 (26 & 27 Vict. c. 125))
| Poll Tax (Amendment No. 2) Act 1660 (repealed) | 12 Cha. 2. c. 28 | 29 December 1660 |
An Act for further suplying and explaining certaine defects in an Act intituled "An Act for the speedy provision of money for disbanding and paying off the forces of this kingdome both by land and sea." (Repealed by Statute Law Revision Act 1863 (26 & 27 Vict. c. 125))
| Taxation (No. 6) Act 1660 (repealed) | 12 Cha. 2. c. 29 | 29 December 1660 |
An Act for the raiseing of seaventy thousand pounds for the further supply of his Majestie. (Repealed by Statute Law Revision Act 1863 (26 & 27 Vict. c. 125))
| Attainder of the Regicides, etc. Act 1660 (repealed) | 12 Cha. 2. c. 30 | 29 December 1660 |
An Act for the Attainder of severall persons guilty of the horrid Murther of his late Sacred Majestie King Charles the first. (Repealed by Statute Law (Repeals) Act 1969 (c. 52))
| Colleges and Hospitals (Leases and Grants Confirmed) Act 1660 (repealed) | 12 Cha. 2. c. 31 | 29 December 1660 |
An Act for Confirmation of Leases and Grants from Colledges and Hospitalls. (Repealed by Statute Law Revision Act 1948 (11 & 12 Geo. 6. c. 62))
| Exportation Act 1660 (repealed) | 12 Cha. 2. c. 32 | 29 December 1660 |
An Act for prohibiting the Exportation of Wooll, Woolfells, Fullers Earth, or any kinde of Scouring Earth. (Repealed by Repeal of Obsolete Statutes Act 1856 (19 & 20 Vict. c. 64))
| Confirmation of Marriages Act 1660 (repealed) | 12 Cha. 2. c. 33 | 29 December 1660 |
An Act for Confirmation of Marriages. (Repealed by Statute Law Revision Act 1863 (26 & 27 Vict. c. 125))
| Tobacco Planting and Sowing Act 1660 (repealed) | 12 Cha. 2. c. 34 | 29 December 1660 |
An Act for Prohibiting the Planting Setting or Sowing of Tobaccho in England and Ireland. (Repealed by Finance (1909-10) Act 1910 (10 Edw. 7 & 1 Geo. 5. c. 8))
| Post Office Act 1660 (repealed) | 12 Cha. 2. c. 35 | 29 December 1660 |
An Act for Erecting and Establishing a Post Office. (Repealed by Statute Law Revision Act 1863 (26 & 27 Vict. c. 125))
| Rolls Estate Act 1660 (repealed) | 12 Cha. 2. c. 36 | 29 December 1660 |
An Act impowering the Master of the Rolls for the time being to make Leases for yeares in order to new build the old houses belonging to the Rolls. (Repealed by Rolls Estate Act 1777 (17 Geo. 3. c. 59))

=== Private acts ===
| Short title | Citation | Royal assent |
Long title
| Naturalization of Peter and John de la Pierre or Peters Act 1660 | 12 Cha. 2. c. 1 Pr. | 29 August 1660 |
An Act for Naturalizing Peter De la Pierre, alias Peters, and John De la Pierre, alias Peters.
| Great Level of the Fens Drainage Act 1660 | 12 Cha. 2. c. 2 Pr. | 13 September 1660 |
An Act for the necessary Maintenance of the Work of Draining the Great Level of the Fens.
| Earl of Inchequin Restoration Act 1660 | 12 Cha. 2. c. 3 Pr. | 13 September 1660 |
An Act for restoring unto Murrough, alias Morgan, Earl of Insiquin, all his Honours, Manors, Lands, and Tenements, in Ireland, whereof he was in Possession on the 23th of October, 1641, or at any Time since.
| Restoration of Marquis of Newcastle Act 1660 | 12 Cha. 2. c. 4 Pr. | 13 September 1660 |
An Act for restoring unto William Marquis of Newcastle, all his Honours, Manors, Lands, and Tenements, in England, whereof he was in Possession on the 20th Day of May, 1640, or at any Time since.
| Earl of Winchelsea's Estate Act 1660 | 12 Cha. 2. c. 5 Pr. | 13 September 1660 |
An Act for the settling of the Priory of Watton, and other Lands belonging to the Earl of Winchilsea, in the County of Yorke, in the Hands of Trustees, for the Payment of Debts.
| Restoration of Sir George Lane Act 1660 | 12 Cha. 2. c. 6 Pr. | 13 September 1660 |
An Act for restoring of Sir George Lane Knight, to the Possession of the Manor of Kathclyne and Lisduffe, and other Lands in Ireland.
| Bays Regulation (Colchester) Act 1660 (repealed) | 12 Cha. 2. c. 7 Pr. (Note: Also listed as 12 Cha. 2. c. 22) | 13 September 1660 |
An Act for the regulating of the Trade of Bay-making, (Note: Baize making.) in the Dutch Bay Hall, in Colchester. (Repealed by Statute Law Revision Act 1863 (26 & 27 Vict. c. 125))
| Restoration of Lord Gerrard Act 1660 | 12 Cha. 2. c. 8 Pr. | 13 September 1660 |
An Act for restoring to Charles Lord Gerard, Baron of Brandon, all his Honours, Manors, Lands, Tenements, and Hereditaments, whereof he was in Possession on the 20th Day of May, 1642, or at any Time sithence.
| Restoration of Lord Colepeper Act 1660 | 12 Cha. 2. c. 9 Pr. | 13 September 1660 |
An Act for restoring to Thomas Lord Culpeper, Son and Heir and Sole Executor of John Lord Culpeper, Baron of Thorswey, and Master of the Rolls, deceased, all the Honours, Manors, Lands, and Tenements, Leases not determined, and Hereditaments whatsoever, whereof the said John Lord Culpeper was in Possession on the 20th Day of May, 1642, or at any Time after, which have not been since sold or aliened by the said John late Lord Culpeper, by Acts or Assurances to which himself was Party and consenting.
| Restoration of Marquis of Hertford Act 1660 | 12 Cha. 2. c. 10 Pr. | 13 September 1660 |
An Act for the restoring of the Marquis of Hertford to the Dukedom of Somersett.
| Skinner's Estate Act 1660 | 12 Cha. 2. c. 11 Pr. | 13 September 1660 |
An Act for enabling Augustine Skynner and Wm. Skynner to make Sale of some Lands, for Payment of Debts.
| Adams School, Newport Act 1660 | 12 Cha. 2. c. 12 Pr. | 13 September 1660 |
An Act for the incorporating of the Master and Wardens of the Company of Haberdashers, London, to be Governors of the Free School and Almshouses at Newport.
| Naturalization of Countess of Derby, Countess of Ossory, Lady Culpeper, Lord Wotton and Dame Emilia Kirkhoven Act 1660 | 12 Cha. 2. c. 13 Pr. | 13 September 1660 |
An Act for the naturalizing of Dorothea Helena Countess of Derby, Wife of the Right Honourable Charles Earl of Derby; and Emelia called Countess of Ossery, Wife of the Right Honourable Thomas Butler, called Earl of Ossery, Son and Heir Apparent to the Right Honourable James Marquis of Ordmond and Earl of Brecknock; and Margarett Lady Culpeper, Wife of the Right Honourable Thomas Lord Culpeper, Baron of Thorsway; and the Right Honourable Charles Kirkhoven Lord Wotton, and Dame Emilia his Sister, Children of Katherin Stanhope Countess of Chesterfeild, by John Kirkhoven, Lord of Hemfleet.
| Estate of Sir George Booth Act 1660 | 12 Cha. 2. c. 14 Pr. | 13 September 1660 |
An Act for enabling of Sir George Booth Baronet to make Leases and Sales of Part of his Estate.
| Lord Ormond (Restoration of Lands, etc., in Ireland) Act 1660 (repealed) | 12 Cha. 2. c. 15 Pr. (Note: Also listed as 12 Cha. 2. c. 7 in The Statutes at Large and The Chronological Table of the Statutes.) | 28 July 1660 |
An Act for restoreing unto James Marquesse of Ormond all his Honours Mannours Land and Tenements in Ireland whereof he was in Possession on the twenty-third Day of October one thousand six hundred forty-one, or at any Time since. (Repealed by Statute Law (Repeals) Act 1977 (c. 18))
| Henry Lord Arundell of Wardour (Restoration of Estate) Act 1660 | 12 Cha. 2. c. 16 Pr. | 29 December 1660 |
An Act for the restoring of Henry Lord Arrundell of Warder to the Possession of his Estate.
| Earl of Arundel's Restoration Act 1660 | 12 Cha. 2. c. 17 Pr. | 29 December 1660 |
An Act for Restitution of Thomas Earl of Arrundell, Surrey, and Norfolke, to the Dignity and Title of Duke of Norfolke.
| Restoration of Wentworth Earl of Roscomon Act 1660 | 12 Cha. 2. c. 18 Pr. | 29 December 1660 |
An Act to restore to Wentworth Earl of Roscomon, of the Kingdom of Ireland, all the Honours, Castles, Lordships, Lands, Tenements, and Hereditaments, in Ireland, whereof James Earl of Roscomon his Great Grandfather, or James Earl of Roscomon his Father, were in Possession on the 23th of October, 1641
| John Newton and William Oakeley Estates Act 1660 | 12 Cha. 2. c. 19 Pr. | 29 December 1660 |
An Act for enabling of John Newton the Younger, and William Oakeley, to make Sale of Lands, for Payment of Debts, and raising of Portions, &c.
| Sir George Hamilton Restoration Act 1660 | 12 Cha. 2. c. 20 Pr. | 29 December 1660 |
An Act for restoring Sir George Hamilton unto his Lands and Estate in Ireland.
| Royston (Hertfordshire and Cambridgeshire) Vicarage Act 1660 | 12 Cha. 2. c. 21 Pr. | 29 December 1660 |
An Act for Maintenance of the Vicar for the Time being of the Vicarage of Royston, in the Counties of Hertford and Cambridge, and of his Successors Vicars of the said Vicarage.
| Sir William Wray's Estate Act 1660 | 12 Cha. 2. c. 22 Pr. | 29 December 1660 |
An Act for enabling Sir William Wray to sell Lands, for Payment of his Debts, and raising of Portions for his Younger Children.
| Naturalization of Vantethusen, Demetrius, Cocke, Cravenburgh and Others Act 1660 | 12 Cha. 2. c. 23 Pr. | 29 December 1660 |
An Act for naturalizing of Gerard Vantenhussens, Daniell Demetrius, and others.
| Protestants of Piedmont Levy Act 1660 | 12 Cha. 2. c. 24 Pr. | 29 December 1660 |
An Act for the levying of certain Monies, for the Protestants of Piedmont.
| Naturalization of John Boreel Act 1660 | 12 Cha. 2. c. 25 Pr. | 29 December 1660 |
An Act for the Naturalization of John Boreel, Esquire, Eldest Son of Sir William Boreel Knight and Baronet.
| Naturalization of Abraham Watchtor Act 1660 | 12 Cha. 2. c. 26 Pr. | 29 December 1660 |
An Act for the Naturalization of Abraham Wachter, born beyond the Sea.
| Sir Thomas Grimes Restoration Act 1660 | 12 Cha. 2. c. 27 Pr. | 29 December 1660 |
An Act for restoring of Sir Thomas Grymes Baronet to his Estate.
| George Faunt's Estate Act 1660 | 12 Cha. 2. c. 28 Pr. | 29 December 1660 |
An Act for enabling George Faunt, of Foston, in the County of Leicester, Esquire, to sell and convey Part of his Lands, for Payment of several Debts and Legacies, charged upon his Estate by Sir William Faunt Knight, deceased; and for the raising of Portions for his younger Children, and for the making his Wife a Jointure.
| Naturalization of Frances Hyde and Others Act 1660 | 12 Cha. 2. c. 29 Pr. | 29 December 1660 |
An Act for naturalizing of Francis Hyde, &c.
| Joseph Micklethwaite's Estate Act 1660 | 12 Cha. 2. c. 30 Pr. | 29 December 1660 |
An Act to enable Joseph Mickletwayte, an Infant, and his Trustees, to sell Land, for Payment of his Father's Debts.
| Sir Edward Gostwicke Maintenance Act 1660 | 12 Cha. 2. c. 31 Pr. | 29 December 1660 |
An Act for raising Portions, and making Provision for Maintenance, for the younger Children of Sir Edward Gostwicke.
| Sir John Clarke and Dame Philodelphia's Estate Act 1660 | 12 Cha. 2. c. 32 Pr. | 29 December 1660 |
An Act for confirming the Sale of the Manor of Hitcham, sold to Charles Doe by Sir John Clarke Knight and Baronet; and for settling and disposing other Lands of the said Sir John Clarke and Dame Philadelphia his Wife.
| Earl of Cleveland's Estate Act 1660 | 12 Cha. 2. c. 33 Pr. | 29 December 1660 |
An Act for the settling of some of the Manors and Lands of the Earl of Cleaveland in Trustees, to be sold, for the satisfying of the Debts of the said Earl, and of Thomas Lord Wentworth his Son.
| Preston (Lancashire) Rectory Act 1660 | 12 Cha. 2. c. 34 Pr. | 29 December 1660 |
An Act for the disappropriating of the Rectory Appropriate of Preston, and uniting and consolidating of the said Rectory, and of the Vicarage of the Church of Preston, and for assuring of the Advowson and Right of Patronage of the same unto the Master, Fellows, and Scholars, of Emanuell Colledge, in Cambridge, and their Successors.
| Precinct of Covent Garden Act 1660 | 12 Cha. 2. c. 35 Pr. | 29 December 1660 |
An Act for making the Precinct of Covent Garden Parochial.

=== Sources ===
- Raithby, John, ed. (1963) [1819]. "12° Car. II.". Statutes of the Realm. Vol. 5: The Statutes of King Charles I and King Charles II (1625–1680). London: Dawsons. pp. 179–303 – via HathiTrust.
- Raithby, John, ed. (1819). Statutes of the Realm. Vol. 5: 1628-80 – via British History Online.
- Pickering, Danby, ed. (1763). "Anno duodecimo Caroli II". The Statutes at Large. Vol. 7: From the Thirty-ninth Year of Q. Elizabeth to the Twelfth Year of K. Charles. Inclusive. Cambridge: Joseph Bentham. pp. 359–512 – via Internet Archive.
- Journal of the House of Commons. Vol. 8 – 1660-1667. His Majesty's Stationery Office. 1802. pp. 1–237 – via British History Online.
- Journal of the House of Lords. Vol. 11: 1660-1666. London: His Majesty's Stationery Office. 1830. pp. 3–239 – via British History Online.
- Chronological Table of and Index to the Statutes. Vol. 1: To the End of the Session 59 Vict. Sess. 2 (1895) (13th ed.). London: Her Majesty's Stationery Office. 1896. pp. 68–69 – via Google Books.
- Chronological Table of the Statutes: Covering the Period from 1235 to the End of 1971. London: Her Majesty's Stationery Office. 1972. p. 66. ISBN 978-0-11-840096-1 – via Google Books.
- "Acts of the English Parliament from 1660". legislation.gov.uk. The National Archives.
- "Chronological Tables of the Private and Personal Acts: Part 3 (1660–1680)". legislation.gov.uk. The National Archives.

== See also ==
- List of acts of the Parliament of England
