= Parliament Act 1660 =

Act of the Parliament of England

Parliament Act 1660 (Note: The citation of this act by this short title was authorised by section 5 of, and the second schedule to, the Statute Law Revision Act 1948. Due to the repeal of those provisions, it is now authorised by section 19(2) of the Interpretation Act 1978.)
- Act of Parliament
- Parliament of England
- Long title: An Act for removing and preventing all Questions and Disputes concerning the Assembling and Sitting of this present Parliament. (Note: These words are printed against this act in the second column of the second schedule to the Statute Law Revision Act 1948, which is headed "Title".)
- Citation: 12 Cha. 2. c. 1
- Territorial extent: England and Wales; Northern Ireland

Dates
- Royal assent: 1 June 1660
- Commencement: 25 April 1660 (Note: Start of session.)
- Repealed: 1 January 1970
Other legislation
Repealed by	Statute Law (Repeals) Act 1969
Relates to	Confirmation of Acts Act 1661; Confirmation of Acts (No. 2) Act 1661; Confirmation of Acts (No. 3) Act 1661; Crown and Parliament Recognition Act 1689

Status: Repealed

Text of statute as originally enacted

Confirmation of Acts Act 1661
- Act of Parliament
- Parliament of England
- Long title: An Act for confirming Publique Acts.
- Citation: 13 Cha. 2. St. 1. c. 7
- Territorial extent: England and Wales

Dates
- Royal assent: 8 July 1661
- Commencement: 8 May 1661 (Note: Start of session.)
- Repealed: 28 July 1863
Other legislation
Amended by	Anniversary Days Observance Act 1859
Repealed by	Statute Law Revision Act 1863
Relates to	Parliament Act 1660; Indemnity and Oblivion Act 1660; Subsidy Act 1660; Excise Act 1660; Excise (No. 2) Act 1660; Poll Tax Act 1660; Legal Proceedings During Commonwealth Act 1660; Disbanding of the Army Act 1660; Poll Tax (Amendment) Act 1660; Customs Act 1660; Taxation (No. 2) Act 1660; Excise (No. 3) Act 1660; Tenures Abolition Act 1660; Wine Act 1660; Taxation (No. 4) Act 1660; Taxation (No. 5) Act 1660; Poll Tax (Amendment No. 2) Act 1660; Taxation (No. 6) Act 1660; Attainder of the Regicides, etc. Act 1660; Taxation Act 1660; Confirmation of Acts (No. 2) Act 1661; Confirmation of Acts (No. 3) Act 1661

Status: Repealed

Text of statute as originally enacted

Confirmation of Acts (No. 2) Act 1661
- Act of Parliament
- Parliament of England
- Long title: An Act for Confirming of three Acts therein mentioned.
- Citation: 13 Cha. 2. St. 1. c. 11
- Territorial extent: England and Wales

Dates
- Royal assent: 30 July 1661
- Commencement: 8 May 1661 (Note: Start of session.)
- Repealed: 28 July 1863
Other legislation
Amended by	Anniversary Days Observance Act 1859
Repealed by	Statute Law Revision Act 1863
Relates to	Parliament Act 1660; Observance of 29th May Act 1660; Taxation (No. 6) Act 1660; Confirmation of Marriages Act 1660; Confirmation of Acts Act 1661; Confirmation of Acts (No. 3) Act 1661

Status: Repealed

Text of statute as originally enacted

Confirmation of Acts (No. 3) Act 1661
- Act of Parliament
- Parliament of England
- Long title: An Act for Confirming an Act Entituled "An Act for encouraging and encreasing of Shipping & Navigation" and severall other Acts both publique and private mentioned therein.
- Citation: 13 Cha. 2. St. 1. c. 14
- Territorial extent: England and Wales; Ireland

Dates
- Royal assent: 30 July 1661
- Commencement: 8 May 1661 (Note: Start of session.)
- Repealed: England and Wales: 28 July 1863; Northern Ireland: 23 May 1950
Other legislation
Amended by	Usury Laws Repeal Act 1854
Repealed by	England and Wales: Statute Law Revision Act 1863; Northern Ireland: Statute Law Revision Act 1950
Relates to	Parliament Act 1660; Commissioners of Sewers Act 1660; Legal Proceedings During Commonwealth Act 1660; Usury Act 1660; Navigation Act 1660; Exportation Act 1660; Tobacco Planting and Sowing Act 1660; Rolls Estate Act 1660; Confirmation of Acts Act 1661; Confirmation of Acts (No. 2) Act 1661

Status: Repealed

Text of statute as originally enacted

The Parliament Act 1660 (12 Cha. 2. c. 1) was an act of the Convention Parliament of England of 1660. The act declared the Long Parliament to be dissolved, and the Lords and Commons then sitting to be the two Houses of Parliament, notwithstanding that they had not been convened by the King.

Since some doubts still existed as to the validity of the act, since the Convention Parliament had not been regularly summoned by the king, the next Parliament passed further Acts, 13 Cha. 2. St. 1. cc. 7 & 14, confirming the laws passed by the previous parliament.

== Subsequent developments ==
The whole act was repealed by section 1 of, and the schedule to, the Statute Law Revision Act 1863 (26 & 27 Vict. c. 125), which came into force on 28 July 1863.

== See also ==
- Crown and Parliament Recognition Act 1689
- Parliament Act (disambiguation)
