= List of acts of the Parliament of England from 1661 =

This is a list of acts of the Parliament of England for the year 1661.

For acts passed during the period 1707–1800, see the list of acts of the Parliament of Great Britain. See also the list of acts of the Parliament of Scotland, and the list of acts of the Parliament of Ireland.

For acts passed from 1801 onwards, see the list of acts of the Parliament of the United Kingdom. For acts of the devolved parliaments and assemblies in the United Kingdom, see the list of acts of the Scottish Parliament, the list of acts of the Northern Ireland Assembly, and the list of acts and measures of Senedd Cymru; see also the list of acts of the Parliament of Northern Ireland.

For medieval statutes, etc. that are not considered to be acts of Parliament, see the list of English statutes.

See also the List of ordinances and acts of the Parliament of England, 1642–1660 for ordinances and acts passed by the Long Parliament and other bodies without royal assent, and which were not considered to be valid legislation following the Restoration in 1660.

The number shown after each act's title is its chapter number. Acts are cited using this number, preceded by the years of the reign during which the relevant parliamentary session was held; thus the Union with Ireland Act 1800 is cited as "39 & 40 Geo. 3. c. 67", meaning the 67th act passed during the session that started in the 39th year of the reign of George III and which finished in the 40th year of that reign. The modern convention is to use Arabic numerals in citations (thus "41 Geo. 3" rather than "41 Geo. III"). Acts of the last session of the Parliament of Great Britain and the first session of the Parliament of the United Kingdom are both cited as "41 Geo. 3".

Acts passed by the Parliament of England did not have a short title; however, some of these acts have subsequently been given a short title by acts of the Parliament of the United Kingdom, such as the Short Titles Act 1896 (59 & 60 Vict. c. 14).

Acts passed by the Parliament of England were deemed to have come into effect on the first day of the session in which they were passed. Because of this, the years given in the list below may in fact be the year before a particular act was passed.

== 13 Cha. 2. St. 1 ==
The first part of the first session of the 2nd Parliament of King Charles II (the 'Cavalier Parliament') which met from 8 May 1661 until 30 July 1661.

This session was also traditionally cited as 13 Cha. 2. Stat. 1, 13 Cha. 2. stat. 1, 13 Cha. 2. St. 1, 13 Cha. 2. st. 1, 13 Car. 2. Stat. 1 (Chronological Table of the Statutes), 13 Car. 2. stat. 1, 13 Car. 2. St. 1, 13 Car. 2. st. 1, 13 Chas. 2. Stat. 1, 13 Chas. 2. stat. 1, 13 Chas. 2. St. 1, 13 Chas. 2. st. 1, 13 Cha. 2, 13 Car. 2, 13 Chas. 2 or 13 C. 2.

=== Public acts ===
Short title	Citation	Royal assent
Long title
Sedition Act 1661 (repealed)	13 Cha. 2. St. 1. c. 1	30 July 1661
An Act for Safety and Preservation of His Majesties Person and Government against Treasonable and Seditious practices and attempts. (Repealed by Criminal Law Act 1967 (c. 58))
Clergy Act 1661 (repealed)	13 Cha. 2. St. 1. c. 2	30 July 1661
An Act for Repeal of an Act of Parliament Entituled "An Act for disenabling all persons in Holy Orders to exercise any Temporall Jurisdiccion or Authority". (Note: Clergy Act 1640 (16 Cha. 1. c. 27)) (Repealed by Statute Law Revision Act 1863 (26 & 27 Vict. c. 125))
Vesting of Certain Moneys, etc. in the King Act 1661 (repealed)	13 Cha. 2. St. 1. c. 3	30 July 1661
An Act for the declaring vesting and setling of all such Moneys Goods and other things in His Majesty which were received levied or collected in these late times, and are remaining in the Hands or Possession of any Treasurers or Receivers, Collectors, or others, not pardoned by the Act of Oblivion. (Repealed by Statute Law Revision Act 1863 (26 & 27 Vict. c. 125))
Illegality of Benevolences, etc. Act 1661	13 Cha. 2. St. 1. c. 4	8 July 1661
An Act for a free and voluntary present to his Majesty.
Tumultuous Petitioning Act 1661 (repealed)	13 Cha. 2. St. 1. c. 5	30 July 1661
An Act against Tumults and Disorders upon pretence of preparing or presenting Peticions or other Addresses to His Majesty or the Parliament. (Repealed by Public Order Act 1986 (c. 64))
The King's Sole Right over the Militia Act 1661 or the Militia Act 1661 (repealed)	13 Cha. 2. St. 1. c. 6	30 July 1661
An Act declaring the sole Right of the Militia to be in King and for the present ordering & disposing the same. (Repealed by Statute Law Revision Act 1863 (26 & 27 Vict. c. 125)) and Statute Law (Repeals) Act 1969 (c. 52))
Confirmation of Acts Act 1661 (repealed)	13 Cha. 2. St. 1. c. 7	8 July 1661
An Act for confirming Publique Acts. (Repealed by Statute Law Revision Act 1863 (26 & 27 Vict. c. 125))
Provision for the King's Journeys Act 1661 (repealed)	13 Cha. 2. St. 1. c. 8	30 July 1661
An Act for providing necessary Carriages for His Majestie in His Royall Progresse and Removalls. (Repealed by Statute Law Revision Act 1863 (26 & 27 Vict. c. 125))
Navy Act 1661 (repealed)	13 Cha. 2. St. 1. c. 9	30 July 1661
An Act for the Establishing Articles and Orders for the regulateing and better Government of His Majesties Navies Ships of Warr & Forces by Sea. (Repealed by Navy Act 1748 (22 Geo. 2. c. 33))
Hunting of Deer Act 1661 (repealed)	13 Cha. 2. St. 1. c. 10	30 July 1661
An Act to prevent the unlawfull Coursing Hurting or Killing of Deere. (Repealed by Stealing of Deer Act 1776 (16 Geo. 3. c. 30))
Confirmation of Acts (No. 2) Act 1661 (repealed)	13 Cha. 2. St. 1. c. 11	30 July 1661
An Act for Confirming of three Acts therein mentioned. (Repealed by Statute Law Revision Act 1863 (26 & 27 Vict. c. 125))
Ecclesiastical Jurisdiction Act 1661 (repealed)	13 Cha. 2. St. 1. c. 12	30 July 1661
An Act for Explanation of a Clause contained in Act of Parliament made in the Seventeenth Year of the late King Charles Entituled "An Act for Repeal of a Branch of a Statute Primo Elizabethe concerning Commissioners for Causes Ecclesiasticall." (Note: Abolition of High Commission Court Act 1640 (16 Cha. 1. c 11)) (Repealed by Statute Law Revision Act 1888 (51 & 52 Vict. c. 3), Ecclesiastical Jurisdiction Measure 1963 (No. 1) and Statute Law (Repeals) Act 1969 (c. 52))
Arrears of Excise Act 1661 (repealed)	13 Cha. 2. St. 1. c. 13	30 July 1661
An Act for vesting the Arreares of the Excise and New Impost in His Majesty. (Repealed by Statute Law Revision Act 1863 (26 & 27 Vict. c. 125))
Confirmation of Acts (No. 3) Act 1661 (repealed)	13 Cha. 2. St. 1. c. 14	30 July 1661
An Act for Confirming an Act Entituled "An Act for encouraging and encreasing of Shipping & Navigation" (Note: Navigation Act 1660 (12 Cha. 2. c. 18)) and severall other Acts both publique and private mentioned therein. (Repealed for England and Wales by Statute Law Revision Act 1863 (26 & 27 Vict. c. 125) and for Northern Ireland by Statute Law Revision Act 1950 (14 Geo. 6. c. 6))
Legal Proceedings During Commonwealth Act 1661 (repealed)	13 Cha. 2. St. 1. c. 15	30 July 1661
An Act declaring the Paines Penalties and Forfeitures imposed upon the Estates and Persons of certaine notorious Offenders excepted out of the Act of Free and Generall Pardon Indempnity and Oblivion. (Repealed by Statute Law Revision Act 1948 (11 & 12 Geo. 6. c. 62))

=== Private acts ===
Short title	Citation	Royal assent
Long title
Masters of the Chancery Fees Act 1661	13 Cha. 2. St. 1. c. 1 Pr.	30 July 1661
An Act for the ascertaining and establishing the Fees of the Masters of the Chancery in Ordinary.
Sir Thomas Prestwich's Estate Act 1661	13 Cha. 2. St. 1. c. 2 Pr.	30 July 1661
An Act for confirming a Sale made, by Sir Thomas Prestwich and others, of the Manor of Holme, and certain Lands in the Parish of Manchester, in the County of Lancaster, unto Sir Edward Mosely Baronet.
Thomas Radcliffe's Estate Restoration Act 1661	13 Cha. 2. St. 1. c. 3 Pr.	30 July 1661
An Act for restoring of Thomas Radcliffe Esquire to all his Lands and Possessions in England and Ireland.
John Harbin's Estate Act 1661	13 Cha. 2. St. 1. c. 4 Pr.	30 July 1661
An Act, enabling John Harbin Esquire to settle, sell, and dispose of, several Manors, Messuages, Lands, Tenements, and Hereditaments, with the Appurtenances in the County of Somersett and Dorsett, therein mentioned, for Payment of his Debts, and to make Provision for his younger Children.
Thomas and John Hunt's Estate Act 1661	13 Cha. 2. St. 1. c. 5 Pr.	30 July 1661
An Act to enable the Sale of some of the Lands of Thomas Hunt Esquire and John Hunt Gentleman, for Payment of his Debts.
Settling manors of Knoll, Seale and Kempsing (Kent) upon Earl of Dorset and heirs and charging manors of Bexhill and Cowding and other lands (Sussex) with a yearly rentcharge of £130 in lieu.	13 Cha. 2. St. 1. c. 6 Pr.	30 July 1661
An Act for settling the Manors of Knoll, Seale, and Kempsing, in the County of Kent, upon the Earl of Dorsett and his Heirs, and charging the Manor of Bexhill, and the Manor or Farm of Cowding, and other Lands in the County of Sussex, with a Rent Charge of One Hundred and Thirty Pounds per Annum, in Lieu thereof.
Worcester Weavers, Fullers and Clothiers Act 1661	13 Cha. 2. St. 1. c. 7 Pr.	30 July 1661
An Act for Confirmation of the Charter and Privileges of the Master, Wardens, and Commonalty of Weavers, Fullers, and Clothiers, in the City of Worcester.
Sir Edward Baesh's Estate Act 1661	13 Cha. 2. St. 1. c. 8 Pr.	30 July 1661
An Act for settling several Lands, late of Sir Edward Baesh Knight, upon Sir Ralph Baesh, Knight of the Bath, Heir of the said Sir Edward, and his Heirs.
Earl of Cleveland's Estate Act 1661	13 Cha. 2. St. 1. c. 9 Pr.	30 July 1661
An Act for Confirmation and Explanation of an Act for the settling of some of the Manors and Lands of the Earl of Cleveland in Trustees, to be sold, for the Satisfaction of the Debts of the said Earl, and Thomas Lord Wentworth his Son. (Note: Earl of Cleveland's Estate Act 1660 (12 Cha. 2. c. 33 Pr.))
Uniting parsonages of St. Andrews and St. Mary Witton in Droitwich (Worcestershire).	13 Cha. 2. St. 1. c. 10 Pr.	30 July 1661
An Act for the uniting the Parsonages of St. Andrewes and St. Mary Witton, in Droitwich, in the County of Worcester.
Lord Abergavenny's Estate Act 1661	13 Cha. 2. St. 1. c. 11 Pr.	30 July 1661
An Act to enable John Lord Abergaveny, Son and Heir of Henry late Lord Abergaveny, to sell certain Lands, for Payment of his Debts, and Preferment of his Brother and Sisters.
Naturalization of Francis Brudenell and Anna Countess of Shrewsbury.	13 Cha. 2. St. 1. c. 12 Pr.	30 July 1661
An Act for the naturalizing of Francis Brudnell Esquire, Son and Heir Apparent of the Right Honourable Robert Lord Brudenell, and of the Right Honourable Anna Maria Countess of Shrewsbury, Daughter of the said Lord Brudnell, and now Wife of the Right Honourable Francis Earl of Shrewsbury.
Reviving a settlement of certain lands on John Orlibeare for life with the remainder to his sons and to their male heirs.	13 Cha. 2. St. 1. c. 13 Pr.	30 July 1661
An Act for the reviving a Settlement of certain Lands on John Orlibeare, for Life; the Remainder to the Sons of the said John successively, and the Heirs Males of their Bodies, &c.
Great Level of the Fens Drainage Act 1661	13 Cha. 2. St. 1. c. 14 Pr.	30 July 1661
An Act for confirming and continuing an Act, (Note: Great Level of the Fens Drainage Act 1660 (12 Cha. 2. c. 2 Pr.)) for the necessary Maintenance of the Work of draining the Great Level of the Fens.
Inclosing of former common highway from Parsons Green to Southfield in Fulham and settling other land for a common highway in lieu.	13 Cha. 2. St. 1. c. 15 Pr.	30 July 1661
An Act for confirming of an Enclosure of Land, formerly used for a Common Highway, from Parsons Greene, to Southfeild, in Fulham; and the settling of other Land for a Common Highway there, in Lieu thereof.
Richard Gipps' Estate Act 1661	13 Cha. 2. St. 1. c. 16 Pr.	30 July 1661
An Act enabling Trustees to sell certain Lands and Tenements, in the Counties of Suffolk and Norfolk, for Payment of the Debts of Richard Gippes Esquire, and providing Portions for his Younger Children.

=== Sources ===
- Raithby, John, ed. (1963) [1819]. "13° Car. II.". Statutes of the Realm. Vol. 5: The Statutes of King Charles I and King Charles II (1625–1680). London: Dawsons. pp. 304–320 – via HathiTrust.
- Raithby, John, ed. (1819). Statutes of the Realm. Vol. 5: 1628-80 – via British History Online.
- Pickering, Danby, ed. (1763). "Anno decimo tertio Caroli II". The Statutes at Large. Vol. 8: From the Twelfth Year of King Charles II to the Last Year of King James II. Inclusive. Cambridge: Joseph Bentham. pp. 1–23 – via Internet Archive.
- Journals of the House of Commons. Vol. 8. London: His Majesty's Stationery Office. 1803. pp. 245–.
- Journal of the House of Lords. Vol. 11: 1660-1666. London: His Majesty's Stationery Office. 1830. pp. 240–332 – via British History Online.
- Chronological Table of and Index to the Statutes. Vol. 1: To the End of the Session 59 Vict. Sess. 2 (1895) (13th ed.). London: Her Majesty's Stationery Office. 1896. p. 69 – via Google Books.
- Chronological Table of the Statutes: Covering the Period from 1235 to the End of 1971. London: Her Majesty's Stationery Office. 1972. pp. 66–67. ISBN 978-0-11-840096-1 – via Google Books.
- "Acts of the English Parliament from 1661". legislation.gov.uk. The National Archives.
- "Chronological Tables of the Private and Personal Acts: Part 3 (1660–1680)". legislation.gov.uk. The National Archives.

== 13 Cha. 2 St. 2 ==
The second part of the first session of the 2nd Parliament of King Charles II (the 'Cavalier Parliament') which met from 20 November 1661 until 20 December 1661.

This session was also traditionally cited as 13 Cha. 2. Stat. 2, 13 Cha. 2. stat. 2, 13 Cha. 2. St. 2, 13 Cha. 2. st. 2, 13 Car. 2. Stat. 2 (Chronological Table of the Statutes), 13 Car. 2. stat. 2, 13 Car. 2. St. 2, 13 Car. 2. st. 2, 13 Chas. 2. Stat. 2, 13 Chas. 2. stat. 2, 13 Chas. 2. St. 2 or 13 Chas. 2. st. 2.

=== Public acts ===
Short title	Citation	Royal assent
Long title
Corporation Act 1661 or the Corporations Act 1661 (repealed)	13 Cha. 2. St. 2. c. 1	20 December 1661
An Act for the well Governing and Regulating of Corporations. (Repealed by Promissory Oaths Act 1871 (34 & 35 Vict. c. 48))
Vexatious Arrests and Delays at Law Act 1661 (repealed)	13 Cha. 2. St. 2. c. 2	20 December 1661
An Act for prevention of Vexations and Oppressions by Arrests and of Delaies in Suits of Law. (Repealed by Civil Procedure Acts Repeal Act 1879 (42 & 43 Vict. c. 59))
Taxation Act 1661 (repealed)	13 Cha. 2. St. 2. c. 3	20 December 1661
An Act for granting unto the Kings Majestie twelve hundred and threescore thousand pounds to bee assessed and levied by an assessment of threescore and ten thousand pounds by the moneth for eighteene months. (Repealed by Statute Law Revision Act 1863 (26 & 27 Vict. c. 125))
Duchy of Cornwall Act 1661 (repealed)	13 Cha. 2. St. 2. c. 4	20 December 1661
An Act to enable the Kings Majestie to make Leases Grants and Copies of Offices Lands Tenements and Hereditaments parcell of his Highnes Dutchy of Cornwall or annexed to the same and for Confirmacion of Leases and Grants already made. (Repealed by Statute Law Revision Act 1948 (11 & 12 Geo. 6. c. 62))

=== Private acts ===
Short title	Citation	Royal assent
Long title
Marquis of Hertford's Restoration Act 1661	13 Cha. 2. St. 2. c. 1 Pr.	20 December 1661
An Act for confirming of an Act for restoring of the Marquis of Hertford to the Dukedom of Somersett. (Note: Restoration of Marquis of Hertford Act 1660 (12 Cha. 2. c. 10 Pr.))
Trinity Church Hull Act 1661	13 Cha. 2. St. 2. c. 2 Pr.	20 December 1661
An Act for dividing Trynity Church, in Kingston upon Hull, from Hassle.
Peyton's Estate Act 1661	13 Cha. 2. St. 2. c. 3 Pr.	20 December 1661
An Act for enabling Algernon Peyton, Doctor of Divinity, to make Sale of Part of his Lands, for Payment of Debts.
Earl of Arundel's Restoration Act 1661	13 Cha. 2. St. 2. c. 4 Pr.	20 December 1661
An Act confirming an Act for Restitution of Thomas Earl of Arundell, Surrey, and Norfolke, to the Dignity and Title of Duke of Norfolke. (Note: Thomas Earl of Arundel, Surrey and Norfolk (Dukedom of Norfolk Restitution) Act 1660 (12 Cha. 2. c. 17 Pr.))
Confirmation of Private Acts Act 1661	13 Cha. 2. St. 2. c. 5 Pr.	20 December 1661
An Act for confirming Private Acts. (Note: Restoration of Lord Gerrard Act 1660 (12 Cha. 2. c. 8 Pr.)) (Note: Augustine and William Skinner's Estate Act 1660 (12 Cha. 2. c. 11 Pr.)) (Note: Henry Lord Arundell of Wardour (Restoration of Estate) Act 1660 (12 Cha. 2. c. 16 Pr.)) (Note: John Newton and William Oakeley Estates Act 1660 (12 Cha. 2. c. 19 Pr.)) (Note: Naturalization of Vantethusen, Demetrius, Cocke, Cravenburgh and Others Act 1660 (12 Cha. 2. c. 23 Pr.)) (Note: Sir Thomas Grimes Restoration Act 1660 (12 Cha. 2. c. 27 Pr.)) (Note: George Faunt's Estate Act 1660 (12 Cha. 2. c. 28 Pr.)) (Note: Sir John Clarke and Dame Philodelphia's Estate Act 1660 (12 Cha. 2. c. 32 Pr.))

=== Sources ===
- Raithby, John, ed. (1963) [1819]. "13° Car. II. Stat. 2". Statutes of the Realm. Vol. 5: The Statutes of King Charles I and King Charles II (1625–1680). London: Dawsons. pp. 321–349 – via HathiTrust.
- Raithby, John, ed. (1819). Statutes of the Realm. Vol. 5: 1628-80 – via British History Online.
- Pickering, Danby, ed. (1763). "Anno decimo tertio Caroli II". The Statutes at Large. Vol. 8: From the Twelfth Year of King Charles II to the Last Year of King James II. Inclusive. Cambridge: Joseph Bentham. pp. 23–32 – via Internet Archive.
- Journals of the House of Commons. Vol. 8. London: His Majesty's Stationery Office. 1803.
- Journal of the House of Lords. Vol. 11: 1660-1666. London: His Majesty's Stationery Office. 1830. pp. 332–358 – via British History Online.
- Chronological Table of and Index to the Statutes. Vol. 1: To the End of the Session 59 Vict. Sess. 2 (1895) (13th ed.). London: Her Majesty's Stationery Office. 1896. p. 69 – via Google Books.
- Chronological Table of the Statutes: Covering the Period from 1235 to the End of 1971. London: Her Majesty's Stationery Office. 1972. p. 67. ISBN 978-0-11-840096-1 – via Google Books.
- "Chronological Tables of the Private and Personal Acts: Part 3 (1660–1680)". legislation.gov.uk. The National Archives.

== See also ==
- List of acts of the Parliament of England
