= Roman Catholic relief bills =

18th/19th century UK legislation

The Roman Catholic relief bills were a series of measures introduced over time in the late 18th and early 19th centuries before the Parliaments of Great Britain and the United Kingdom to remove the restrictions and prohibitions imposed on British and Irish Catholics during the English Reformation. These restrictions had been introduced to enforce the separation of the English church from the Catholic Church which began in 1529 under Henry VIII.

Following the death of the Jacobite claimant to the British throne James Francis Edward Stuart on 1 January 1766, the pope recognised the legitimacy of the Hanoverian dynasty, which began a process of rapprochement between the Catholic Church and the United Kingdom. Over the next sixty-three years, various bills were introduced in Parliament to repeal restrictions against practise of the Catholic faith, but these bills encountered political opposition, especially during the Napoleonic Wars. With the exception of the Papists Act 1778 (18 Geo. 3. c. 60) and the Roman Catholic Relief Act 1791 (31 Geo. 3. c. 32), these bills were defeated. Then, finally, most of the remaining restrictions against Catholics in the United Kingdom were repealed by the Roman Catholic Relief Act 1829 (10 Geo. 4. c. 7).

== Background ==
=== England ===
Under laws passed in the reign of Elizabeth I, any English subject receiving Holy Orders of the Church of Rome and coming to England was guilty of high treason, and any one who aided or sheltered him was guilty of a capital felony. It was likewise made treason to be reconciled to the Church of Rome and to procure others to be reconciled. Any official, civil and ecclesiastical, who refused to take the Oath of Supremacy denying the pope's spiritual jurisdiction could also be tried for treason. Parents were prohibited from educating their children in the Catholic faith.

Saying Mass was punishable by a fine of 200 marks, while attending Mass was subject to a fine of 100 marks. The statutes of recusancy punished nonconformity with the Established Church by a fine of twenty pounds per lunar month during which the parish church was not attended, there being thirteen of such months in the year. Such non-attendances constituted recusancy in the proper sense of the term, and originally affected all, whether Catholic or otherwise, who did not conform.

In 1593 by the Popish Recusants Act 1592 (35 Eliz. 1. c. 2), the consequences of such non-conformity were limited to Popish recusants. A Papist, convicted of absenting himself from church, became a Popish recusant convict, and besides the monthly fine of £20, was prohibited from holding any office or employment, from keeping arms in his house, from maintaining actions or suits at law or in equity, from being an executor or a guardian, from presenting to an advowson, from practising the law or physic, and from holding office civil or military. He was likewise subject to the penalties attaching to excommunication, was not permitted to travel five miles (8.0 km) from his house without licence, under pain of forfeiting all his goods, and might not come to court under a penalty of £100. Other provisions extended similar penalties to married women. Popish recusants convict were, within three months of conviction, either to submit and renounce their papistry, or, if required by four justices, to abjure the realm. If they did not depart, or returned without licence, they were guilty of a capital felony.

The Oath of Allegiance, enacted under James I in 1606 in immediate aftermath of the Gunpowder Plot, required Catholic recusants to declare their loyalty to James. By the Corporation Act 1661 (13 Cha. 2 St. 2. c. 1), no one could legally be elected to any municipal office unless he had within the year received the Sacrament according to the rite of the Church of England, and likewise, taken the Oath of Supremacy. The first provision excluded all non-conformists; the second Catholics only. The Test Act 1673 (25 Cha. 2. c. 2) imposed on all officers, civil and military, a "Declaration against Transubstantiation", whereby Catholics were debarred from such employment. Five years later, the Test Act 1678 (30 Cha. 2. St. 2) required all members of either House of Parliament, before taking their seats, to make a "Declaration against Popery", denouncing Transubstantiation, the Mass and the invocation of saints as idolatrous.

=== After the Glorious Revolution ===
With the Revolution of 1688 came a new crop of penal laws. These laws were more likely to be enforced. The sanguinary penalties of the sixteenth century had, in great measure, defeated their own end but were generally left on the statute book in terrorem. That is, the Elizabethan laws were so harsh that no one was willing to actually enforce them. In 1689, the Papists Act 1688 (1 Will. & Mar. c. 9) substituted a shorter form of the Oath of Allegiance and Supremacy, the clause aimed against Catholics being carefully retained. It was likewise ordered that all Papists and reputed Papists should be "amoved" ten miles (16 km) from the cities of London and Westminster.

The Popery Act 1698 (11 Will. 3. c. 4) effective 25 March 1700, offered a reward of one hundred pounds was to anyone who should give information leading to the conviction of a Popish priest or bishop, who was made punishable by imprisonment for life. Moreover, any Papist who within six months of attaining the age of eighteen failed to take the Oath of Allegiance and Supremacy and subscribe to the Declaration against Popery, was disabled in respect to himself (but not of his heirs or posterity) from acquiring or holding land, and until he submitted, his next of kin who was a Protestant might enjoy his lands, without being obliged to account for the profits. The recusant was also incapable of purchasing, and all trusts on his behalf were void.

With the Security of the Sovereign Act 1714 (1 Geo. 1. St. 2. c. 13) a new element was introduced, namely 'constructive recusancy'. The Oath of Allegiance and Supremacy might be tendered to any suspected person by any two justices of the peace, and persons refusing it were to be adjudged Popish recusants convict and to forfeit, and be proceeded against accordingly. Thus the refusal of the oath was placed on the same footing as a legal conviction, and the person so convicted was rendered liable to all penalties under those statutes. At the same time an obligation was imposed on Catholics requiring them to register their names and estates, and to enroll their deeds and wills.

=== Enforcement in the 18th century ===
These penal laws remained on the statute book unmitigated till late in the 18th century, and although there was less and less disposition to put them in force, there was ever the danger, which upon occasion grew more acute. In 1767 a priest named Malony was tried at Croydon for his priesthood, and condemned to perpetual imprisonment, which, at the end of two or three years, was commuted "by the mercy of the Government" to banishment. In 1768 the Reverend James Webb was tried in the Court of King's Bench for saying Mass but was acquitted, the Chief Justice, Lord Mansfield, ruling that there was no evidence sufficient to convict.

In 1769 and on other occasions, seemingly as late as 1771, Dr. James Talbot, coadjutor to Bishop Challoner, was tried for his life at the Old Bailey, on the charge of his priesthood and of saying Mass, but was acquitted on similar grounds. Such instances were not solitary. In 1870, Charles Butler found that one firm of lawyers had defended more than twenty priests under prosecutions of this nature. In 1778 a Catholic committee was formed to promote the cause of relief for their co-religionists, and though several times elected afresh, continued to exist until 1791, with a short interval after the Gordon Riots. It was always uniformly aristocratic in composition, and until 1787 included no representation of the hierarchy and then but three co-opted members.

=== Papists Act 1778 ===
In the same year, 1778, was passed the first 'Act for Catholic Relief', the Papists Act 1778 (18 Geo. 3. c. 60). By this, an oath was imposed, which besides a declaration of loyalty to the reigning sovereign, contained an abjuration of the Pretender, and of certain doctrines attributed to Catholics, as that excommunicated princes may lawfully be murdered, that no faith should be kept with heretics, and that the pope has temporal as well as spiritual jurisdiction in this realm. Those taking this oath were exempted from some of the provisions of the Act of Settlement 1701. The section as to taking and prosecuting priests were repealed, as also the penalty of perpetual imprisonment for keeping a school. Catholics were also enabled to inherit and purchase land, nor was a Protestant heir any longer empowered to enter and enjoy the estate of his Catholic kinsman.

The passing of this act was the occasion of the Gordon Riots in 1780, in which the violence of the mob was especially directed against Lord Mansfield who had balked various prosecutions under the statutes now repealed.

=== Roman Catholic Relief Act 1791 ===
In 1791 there followed another the Roman Catholic Relief Act 1791 (31 Geo. 3. c. 32), far more extensive and far-reaching legislation. By it there was again an oath to be taken, in character much like that of 1778, but including an engagement to support the Protestant Succession under the Act of Settlement (12 & 13 Will. 3. c. 2).

Catholics were no longer to be summoned to take the Oath of Supremacy, or to be removed from London; the legislation of George I, requiring them to register their estates and wills, was repealed; while the legal professions were opened to them. It was however provided that all their assemblies for religious worship should be certified at Quarter Sessions.

The Roman Catholic Relief Act 1791 marked a step in the removal of Catholic grievances. William Pitt and his rival, Charles James Fox, were alike pledged to a full measure of Catholic Emancipation, but they were both thwarted by George III, who insisted that to agree to any such measure would be a violation of his coronation oath.

=== Catholic opinion ===
There were at this period considerable dissensions within the Catholic ranks. These concerned first the question of veto on the appointment of bishops in Ireland, which it was proposed to confer on the British government, and belongs chiefly to the history of Catholic emancipation in that country. There was another cause of dissension, more properly English, which was connected with the adjuration of the supposed Catholic doctrines contained in the oath imposed upon those who wished to participate in the benefits conferred by the Roman Catholic Relief Act 1791, as previously by the Papists Act 1778. The lay members of the Catholic committee who had framed this disclaimer were accused by the vicars apostolic, who then administered the Catholic Church in England, of tampering with matters of ecclesiastical discipline; and although the bishops had their way in the matter of the oath, the feud survived, and was proclaimed to the world by the formation in 1792 of the Cisalpine Club, the members whereof were pledged "to resist any ecclesiastical interference which may militate against the freedom of English Catholics".

=== Emancipation ===
The Catholic Emancipation Act 1829 (10 Geo. 4. c. 7) had the effect of opening public life to Catholics taking the prescribed oath, enabling them to sit in Parliament, to vote at elections (as previously they could not in England or Scotland, though they could in Ireland) to fill all offices of state with a few exceptions (a Catholic cannot succeed to the throne, and a sovereign becoming a Catholic or marrying one, thereby forfeits the crown, and a Catholic cannot hold the office of Regent.)

Like the previous Relief Acts, the Roman Catholic Relief Act 1829 still retained the "Roman Catholic Oath", to be imposed upon those who desire to enjoy its benefits. it likewise added something in the way of penal legislation by a clause prohibiting religious orders of men to receive new members, and subjecting those who should disobey to banishment as misdemeanants. Finally, the Promissory Oaths Act 1871 abolished the Roman Catholic Oath, as well as the declaration against Transubstantiation. The other final impositions, such as admittance to Catholic religious orders and public processions being illegal, were repealed with the Roman Catholic Relief Act 1926.

== Ireland ==
When Elizabeth became Queen of England, her Irish deputy was ordered "to set up the worship of God in Ireland as it is in England". The Irish Parliament soon enacted that all candidates for office should take the Oath of Supremacy; and by the Act of Uniformity the Protestant liturgy was prescribed in all churches. For a time these Acts were mildly enforced. But when the pope excommunicated the queen, and the Spanish king made war on her, and both in attempting to dethrone her found that the Irish Catholics were ready to be instruments and allies, the latter, regarded as rebels and traitors by the English sovereign and her ministers, were persecuted and hunted down.

James II of England insisted on Catholic predominance and soon picked a quarrel with his Protestant subjects which resulted in the loss of his crown. The war which followed in Ireland was terminated by the Treaty of Limerick, and had its terms been kept, the position of the Catholics would have been at least tolerable. Granted such privileges as they had enjoyed in the reign of Charles II, with an Oath of Allegiance substituted for the Oath of Supremacy, and with a promise of a further relaxation of the penal enactments in force, they could practice their religion without hindrance, sit in Parliament and vote for its members, engage in trade and in the learned professions, and fill all civil and military offices; and they were protected in the possession of the lands they held. William III was in favour of these, and even more generous terms.

The treaty was not ratified. For more than a quarter of a century the work of outlawry and proscription was continued by an exclusively Protestant Parliament at Dublin. An Irish Judge declared in 1760 that the law did not recognize the existence of an Irish Catholic, and, assuredly the penal code had placed him effectually beyond its pale. It branded Catholics with proscription and inferiority, struck at every form of Catholic activity, and checked every symptom of Catholic enterprise. It excluded them from Parliament, from the corporations, from the learned professions, from civil and military offices, from being executors, or administrators, or guardians of property, from holding land under lease, or from owning a horse worth £5. They were deprived of arms and of the franchise, denied education at home and punished if they sought it abroad, forbidden to observe Catholic Holy Days, to make pilgrimages, or to continue to use the old monasteries as the burial places of their dead. For the clergy there was no mercy, nothing but prison, exile, or death.

=== The 18th century ===
After the Catholics had vainly protested against the bill "To Prevent the Further Growth of Popery" of 1704, their protests ceased. The tide turned. The Irish Parliament became less bigoted, and after 1750 or thereabouts no more penal laws were passed.

The British Parliament asserted and exercised the right to legislate for Ireland, treated the Irish Parliament with disdain, and in the interests of English manufacturers imposed commercial restrictions on Irish trade. Dissatisfied with their English friends, the Irish Protestants turned to their own Catholic countrymen.

Dr. Curry, a Dublin physician, Mr. Wyse of Waterford, and Mr. Charles O'Connor, formed, in 1759, a Catholic Association, which was to meet at Dublin, correspond with representative Catholics in the country, and watch over Catholic interests. The new association was chiefly manned by Dublin merchants. Under its auspices, a loyal address was presented to the viceroy, and another to George III on his accession to the throne.

=== Act of 1771 ===
These friendlier dispositions, however, were slow to develop into legislative enactments, and not until 1771 did the first instalment of emancipation come. Under the Unprofitable Bogs (Ireland) Act 1771 (11 & 12 Geo. 3. c. 21 (I)) Catholics were allowed to reclaim and hold under lease for sixty-one years 50 acres (20 ha) of bog but it should not be within a mile of any city or market town. Three years later an oath of allegiance was substituted for that of supremacy.

A further concession was granted in 1778 when under the Leases for Lives Act 1777 (17 & 18 Geo. 3. c. 49 (I)) Catholics were allowed to hold leases of land for 999 years, and might inherit land in the same way as Protestants, the preamble of the act declaring that the law was passed to reward Catholics for their long-continued peaceable behaviour, and for the purpose of allowing them to enjoy "the blessings of our free constitution". Distrust of them, however, continued, and though they subscribed money to equip the volunteers, they would not be admitted within the ranks. Nor was the Irish Parliament of 1782 willing to do more in the Roman Catholic Relief Act 1782 (21 & 22 Geo. 3. c. 24 (I)) than to repeal the law compelling bishops to quit the kingdom, and the law binding those who had assisted at Mass to give the celebrant's name. Further, Catholics were no longer prohibited from owning a horse worth £5, and Catholic schools might be opened with the consent of the Protestant bishop of the diocese. These small concessions were not supplemented by others for ten years.

In 1763 the Catholic Association fell to pieces. After ten years of inactivity, a Catholic committee was formed partly out of the debris of the defunct association. Its chairman was Thomas Browne, 4th Viscount Kenmare, and again it sought to have all Catholics act together. When a majority of the Catholic Committee favoured more assertive measures, Kenmare, and sixty-eight others who sympathised with him, seceded from its ranks. This was in 1791. The committee then chose for its leader John Keogh, a Dublin merchant and a man who favoured bolder measures and a decisive tone. Instead of begging for small concessions, he demanded the repeal of the whole penal code, a demand considered so extravagant that it had few friends in Parliament.

=== Background to Pitt ===
Unrepresentative and corrupt, Parliament continued to be dominated by pensioners and placemen, and under the influence of FitzGibbon and Foster, it refused to advance further on the path of concession. Even Charlemont and Flood would not join emancipation with parliamentary reform, and while willing to safeguard Catholic liberty and property would give Catholics no political power. But this attitude of intolerance and exclusion could not be indefinitely maintained. The French Revolution was in progress, and a young and powerful republic had arisen preaching the rights of man, the iniquity of class distinctions and religious persecution, and proclaiming its readiness to aid all nations who were oppressed and desired to be free. These attractive doctrines rapidly seized on men's minds, and Ireland did not escape their influence.

The Ulster Presbyterians celebrated with enthusiasm the fall of the Bastille, and in 1791 founded the Society of United Irishmen, having as the two chief planks in its programme parliamentary reform and Catholic emancipation. The Catholics and Dissenters, so long divided by religious antagonism, were coming together, and if they made a united demand for equal rights for all Irishmen, without distinction of creed, the ascendency of the Episcopalian Protestants, who were but a tenth of the population, must necessarily disappear. Yet the selfish and corrupt junta who ruled the Parliament, and ruled Ireland, would not yield an inch of ground, and only under the strongest pressure from England was an act passed in 1792 admitting Catholics to the Bar, legalizing marriages between Catholics and Protestants, and allowing Catholic schools to be set up without the necessity of obtaining the permission of a Protestant bishop.

Such grudging concessions irritated rather than appeased in the existing temper of the Catholic body. To consider their position and take measures for the future, the Catholic Committee had delegates appointed by the different parishes in Ireland, and in December, 1792, a Catholic convention commenced its sittings in Dublin. By some Protestants, it was derisively called the Back Lane Parliament, and every effort was made to discredit its proceedings and identify it with sedition. FitzGibbon excited the fears of the Protestant landlords by declaring that the repeal of the penal code would involve the repeal of the Act of Settlement 1701 (12 & 13 Will. 3. c. 2), and invalidate the titles by which they held their lands. The Catholic convention, however, went on unheeding, and, turning with contempt from the Dublin Parliament, sent delegates with a petition to London. The relations between Catholics and Dissenters were then so friendly that Keogh became a United Irishman, and a Protestant barrister named Theobald Wolfe Tone, the ablest of the United Irishmen, became secretary to the Catholic Committee. And when the Catholic delegates on their way to London passed through Belfast, their carriage was drawn through the streets by Presbyterians amid thunders of applause.

=== Roman Catholic Relief Act 1793 ===
The king received the Catholics, and William Pitt and Dundas, the Home Secretary, warned the Irish junta that the time for concessions had come, and that if rebellion broke out in Ireland, Protestant ascendency would not be supported by British arms. And then these Protestants, whom FitzGibbon and the viceroy painted as ready to die rather than yield quietly, gave way. The Roman Catholic Relief Act 1793 (33 Geo. 3. c. 21 (I)) was enacted, giving the Catholics the parliamentary and municipal franchise, and admitting them to the university and to office. They were still excluded from Parliament in the sense that the oath required before taking a seat was repugnant to them, and from the higher offices, and from being king's counsel, but in all other respects they were placed on a level with Protestants. In the House of Commons Foster spoke and voted against the bill. In the Lords, though not opposing it, FitzGibbon spoiled the effect of the concession by a bitter speech, and by having an Act passed declaring the Catholic convention illegal, and prohibiting all such conventions, Catholic or otherwise, in the future.

Relief from so many disabilities left the Catholics almost free. Few of them were affected by exclusion from the higher offices, fewer still by exclusion from the inner Bar; and liberal Protestants would always be found ready to voice Catholic interests in Parliament if they owed their seats to Catholic votes. Besides, in the better temper of the times, it was certain that these last relics of the penal code would soon disappear. Meantime what was needed was a sympathetic and impartial administration of the law. But with FitzGibbon the guiding spirit of Irish government this was impossible. The grandson of a Catholic peasant, he hated Catholics and seized upon every occasion to cover them and their religion with insults. Autocratic and overbearing, he commanded rather than persuaded, and since he became attorney-general in 1783, his influence in Irish government was immense. His action on the regency question in 1789 procured him the special favour of the king and of Pitt, and he became a peer and Lord Chancellor. It was one of the anomalies of the Irish constitution that a change of measures did not involve a change of men, and hence the viceroy and the chief secretary, who had opposed all concessions to Catholics, were retained in office, and FitzGibbon was still left as if to prevent further concessions and to nullify what had been done.

=== Political change ===
For a brief period, however, it seemed as if men as well as measures were to be changed. At the end of 1794 a section of the English Whigs joined Pitt's administration. The Duke of Portland became Home Secretary, with Irish affairs in his department, and Earl Fitzwilliam became Lord Lieutenant. He came to Ireland early in 1795. His sympathy with the Catholics was well known; he was the friend of Henry Grattan and the Ponsonbys, the champions of Emancipation, and, in coming to Ireland, he believed he had the full sanction of Pitt to popularise Irish Government and finally settle the Catholic question. At once he dismissed Cooke, the Under Secretary, a determined foe of concession and reform, and also John Beresford who, with his relatives, filled so many offices that he was called the "King" of Ireland. FitzGibbon and Foster he seldom consulted. Further, when Grattan, at the opening of Parliament, introduced an Emancipation Bill, Fitzwilliam determined to support it. Of all that he did or intended to do, he informed the English Ministry, and got no word of protest in reply, and then when the hopes of the Catholics ran high, Pitt turned back and Fitzwilliam was recalled. Why he was thus repudiated, after being allowed to go so far, has never been satisfactorily explained. It may be because Pitt changed his mind, and meditating a union, wished to leave the Catholic question open. It may be because of the dismissal of Beresford who had powerful friends. It may be that Fitzwilliam, misunderstanding Pitt, went further than he wished him to go; and it seems evident that he managed the question badly and irritated interests he ought to have appeased. Lastly, it is certain that FitzGibbon poisoned the king's mind by pointing out that to admit Catholics to Parliament would be to violate his coronation oath.

The change, however it be explained, was certainly complete. The new viceroy was instructed to conciliate the Catholic clergy by establishing a seminary for the education of Irish priests, and he established Maynooth College. But all further concessions to Catholics and every attempt to reform Parliament, he was firmly to oppose. He was to encourage the enemies of the people and frown upon their friends, and he was to rekindle the dying fires of sectarian hate. And all this he did. Beresford and Cooke were restored to office, Foster favoured more than ever, FitzGibbon made Earl of Clare, Grattan and Ponsonby regarded with suspicion, and the corrupt majority in Parliament petted and caressed. The religious factions of the "Defenders" and the "Peep o' Day Boys" in Ulster became embittered with a change of names. The Defenders became United Irishmen, and these, despairing of Parliament, became republicans and revolutionists, and after Fitzwilliam's recall were largely recruited by Catholics. Their opponents became identified with the Orange society recently formed in Ulster, with William of Orange as its patron saint, and intolerance of Catholicism as the chief article in its creed. These rival societies spread to the other provinces, and while every outrage done by Catholics was punished by Government, those done by Orangemen were condoned.

=== War legislation ===
In rapid succession Parliament passed an Arms Act, an Insurrection Act, an Indemnity Act, and a suspension of the Habeas Corpus Act, and these placed the Catholics beyond the protection of law. An undisciplined soldiery recruited from the Orangemen were let loose among them; destruction of Catholic property, free quarters, flogging, picketing, half-hanging, outrages on women followed, until at last Catholic patience was exhausted. Grattan and his friends, vainly protesting, withdrew from Parliament, and Clare and Foster had then a free hand. They were joined by Viscount Castlereagh, and under their management the rebellion of 1798 broke out with all its attendant horrors.

When it was suppressed Pitt's policy of a legislative union gradually unfolded itself, and Foster and Clare, who had so long acted together, had reached the parting of the ways. The latter, with Castlereagh, was ready to go on and support the proposed union; but Foster drew back, and in the union debates his voice and influence were the most potent on the opposition side. His defection was considered a serious blow by Pitt, who vainly offered him offices and honours. Others followed the lead of Foster, incorruptible amidst corruption; Grattan and his friends returned to Parliament; and the opposition became so formidable that Castlereagh was defeated in 1799, and had to postpone the question of a union to the following year. During this interval, with the aid of Cornwallis who succeeded Camden as viceroy in 1798, he left nothing undone to ensure success, and threats and terrors, bribery and corruption were freely employed. Cornwallis was strongly in favour of emancipation as part of the union arrangement, and Castlereagh was not averse; and Pitt would probably have agreed with them had not Clare visited him in England and poisoned his mind. That bitter anti-Catholic boasted of his success; and when Pitt in 1799 brought forward his union resolutions in the British Parliament, he would only promise that at some future time something might be done for the Catholics, dependent, however on their good conduct, and on the temper of the times.

But something more than this was required. The anti-Unionists were making overtures to the Catholics, knowing that the county members elected by Catholic votes could be decisively influenced by Catholic voters. In these circumstances Castlereagh was authorised to assure the leading Irish Catholics that Pitt and his colleagues only waited for a favourable opportunity to bring forward emancipation, but that this should remain a secret lest Protestant prejudice be excited and Protestant support lost. These assurances obtained Catholic support for the union. Not all of the Catholics, however, favoured it, and many of them opposed it to the last. Many more would have been on the same side had they not been repelled by the bigotry of Foster, who stubbornly refused to advocate emancipation, and in doing so failed to make the fight against the union a national struggle. As for the uneducated Catholics, they did not understand political questions, and viewed the union contest with indifference. The gentry had no sympathy with a Parliament from which they were excluded, nor the clergy for one which encouraged the atrocities of the recent rebellion. Gratitude for the establishment of Maynooth College inclined some of the bishops to support the government; and Pitt's assurances that concessions would come in the United Parliament inclined them still more.

=== Unionism supported ===
From the first, indeed, Francis Moylan, Bishop of Cork, was a Unionist, as was John Thomas Troy, Archbishop of Dublin. In 1798 the latter favoured a union provided there was no clause against future emancipation, and, early in the following year, he induced nine of his brother bishops to concede to the Government a veto on episcopal appointments in return for a provision for the clergy. The bent of his mind was to support authority, even when authority and tyranny were identified, and through the terrible weeks of the rebellion his friendly relations with Dublin Castle were unbroken. He was foremost in every negotiation between the Government and the Catholics, and he and some of his colleagues went so far in advocating the union, that Grattan angrily described them as a "band of prostituted men engaged in the service of Government". This language is unduly severe, for they were clearly not actuated by mercenary motives; but they certainly advanced the cause of the union.

=== Pitt resigns ===
Remembering this, and the assurances given by Castlereagh, they looked for an early measure of emancipation, and when in 1801 the United Parliament first opened its doors, their hopes ran high. The omission of all reference to emancipation in the King's Speech disappointed them; but when Pitt resigned and was succeeded by Addington, an aggressive anti-Catholic, they saw that they had been shamefully betrayed.

In Parliament Pitt explained that he and his colleagues wished to supplement the Act of Union by concessions to the Catholics, and that, having encountered insurmountable obstacles they resigned, feeling that they could no longer hold office consistently with their duty and their honour. Cornwallis, on his own behalf and on behalf of the retiring ministers, assured the Irish Catholic leaders, and in language which was free from every shade of ambiguity, that the blame rested with George III, whose stubborn bigotry nothing could overcome. He promised that Pitt would do everything to establish the Catholic cause in public favour, and would never again take office unless emancipation were conceded; and he advised the Catholics to be patient and loyal, knowing that with Pitt working on their behalf the triumph of their cause was near. Cornwallis noted with satisfaction that this advice was well received by Dr. Troy and his friends. But those who knew Pitt better had no faith in his sincerity, and their estimate of him was proved to be correct, when he again became Prime Minister in 1804, no longer the friend of the Catholics but their opponent.

The fact was that he had played them false throughout. He knew that the king was violently opposed to them; that he had assented to the Union in the hope that it would "shut the door to any further measures with respect to the Roman Catholics" that he believed that to assent to such measures would be a violation of his coronation oath. Had Pitt been sincere he would have endeavoured to change the king's views, and failing to persuade he would have resigned office, and opposed his successor. And if he had acted thus the king must have yielded, for no government to which the great minister was opposed could have lived. Pitt's real reason for resigning in 1801 was, that the nation wanted peace, and he was too proud to make terms with Napoleon. He supported Addington's measures; nor did he lift a finger on behalf of the Catholics; and when the Treaty of Amiens was broken and the great struggle with France was being renewed, he brushed Addington aside with disdain. In 1801 the king had one of his fits of insanity, and when he recovered complained that Pitt's agitation of the Catholic question was the chief cause of his illness; in consequence of which, when Pitt returned to power, in 1804, he bound himself never again to agitate the question during the lifetime of the king.

=== No progress ===
Pitt himself died in 1806, after having opposed the Catholic claims in the preceding year. A brief period of hope supervened when the "Ministry of all the Talents" took office; but hope was soon dissipated by the death of Fox, and by the dismissal of Grenville and his colleagues. They had brought into Parliament a bill assimilating the English law to the Irish by allowing Catholics in England to get commissions in the army. But the king not only insisted on having the measure dropped, but also that ministers should pledge themselves against all such concessions in the future; and when they indignantly refused he dismissed them. The Duke of Portland then became premier, with Spencer Perceval leader in the Commons; and the ministry going to the country in 1807 on a 'No Popery' cry, were returned with an enormous majority.

Grattan was then in Parliament. He had entered it in 1805 with reluctance, partly at the request of Lord Fitzwilliam, chiefly in the hope of being able to serve the Catholics. He supported the petition presented by Fox; he presented Catholic petitions himself in 1808 and 1810; and he supported Parnell's motion for a commutation of tithes; but each time he was defeated, and it was plain that the Catholic cause was not advancing. The Catholic Committee, broken up by the rebellion, had been revived in 1805. But its members were few, its meetings irregularly held, its spirit one of diffidence and fear, its activity confined to preparing petitions to Parliament. Nor were its leaders the stamp of men to conduct a popular movement to success. Keogh was old, and age and the memory of the events he had passed through chilled his enthusiasm for active work. Arthur Plunkett, 9th Earl of Fingall was suave and conciliatory, and not without courage, but was unable to grapple with great difficulties and powerful opponents. Jenico Preston, 12th Viscount Gormanston and Trimbleston were out of touch with the people; Arthur French, Mr. Hussey, and Mr. Clinch were men of little ability; Denys Scully was a clever lawyer who had written a book on the penal laws; and Thomas Dromgoole was a lawyer with a taste for theology and Church history, a Catholic bigot ill-suited to soften Protestant prejudice or win Protestant support. As for Dr. Troy, he was still the courtly ecclesiastic, and neither Pitt's treachery nor the contempt with which the Catholics were treated could weaken his attachment to Dublin Castle. He still favoured the Veto, but an event which occurred in 1808 showed that he was no longer supported by his brethren of the episcopacy. An English bishop, John Milner, who had sometimes acted as English agent for the Irish bishops, thought it right to declare to Grattan in their name that they were willing to concede the Veto; and Lord Fingall took a similar liberty with the Catholic Committee. The former, as having exceeded his powers, was promptly repudiated by the Irish bishops, the latter by the Catholic Committee, and this repudiation of the Veto was hailed with enthusiasm throughout Ireland.

=== O'Connell ===
Daniel O'Connell believed that Catholic grievances might be redressed by peaceful agitation. From 1810 his position was that of leader, and the fight for emancipation was the fight made by O'Connell. It was an uphill fight. Anxious to attract the Catholic masses, and at the same time not to infringe on the Convention Act, he had drawn up the constitution of the Catholic Committee in 1809 with great care; but it went down before a viceregal proclamation, and the same fate befell its successor, the Catholic Board.

The viceroys of the time were advised by the Orangemen, and governed by coercion acts. O'Connell's difficulties were increased by the continued agitation of the Veto. In opposing it he was aided by the bishops and the clergy; but John Thomas Troy and Lord Fingall, aided by the English Catholics, procured a rescript from Rome in their favour.

=== 1813 and later bills ===
The Roman Catholic Relief Act 1813 extended the Roman Catholic Relief Act 1793's relief to Irish Roman Catholics in England.

In 1813, Grattan, supported by Canning and Castlereagh, passed through its second reading a Catholic Relief Bill, which however was lost in committee. Nothing daunted, he continued his efforts. He conceded the Veto, and yet each year the motion he brought forward was rejected.

When he died in 1820 Plunket took the matter in hand, and in 1821 succeeded in passing a bill through the House of Commons. Even the concession of the Veto could not buy off the hostility of the House of Lords, who threw out the bill; and it seemed as if emancipation would never come.

=== 1820s ===
The visit of George IV to Ireland in 1821 brought a brief period of hope. The king before leaving Ireland expressed his gratitude to his subjects, and counselled the different classes to cultivate moderation and forbearance. But to the end of his reign continued to oppose Catholic claims.

In 1823 O'Connell founded the Catholic Association. His chief assistant was a young barrister named Sheil. They were old friends, but had quarrelled about the Veto. To evade the Convention Act the new association, specially formed to obtain emancipation "by legal and constitutional means", was merely a club, but it gradually made headway. Dr. Doyle, Bishop of Kildare, joined it at an early stage, as did Daniel Murray, Coadjutor Archbishop of Dublin, and many hundreds of the clergy. It was suppressed in 1825. At the same time a Catholic Relief Bill passed the House of Commons, but was thrown out in the Lords, and all that Ireland got from Parliament was the act suppressing the Association, or the Algerine Act, as it was often called.

The Catholic Association, changing its name into the New Catholic Association and remodelling its constitution, continued its work. It was to build churches, obtain cemeteries, defend Catholic interests, take a census of the different religions, and for these the "New Catholic Rent" was subscribed, and meetings were held in Dublin, where Catholic grievances were discussed.

The Roman Catholic Relief Act 1793 had conferred the franchise on the forty-shilling freeholders, and landlords, to increase their own political influence, had largely created such freeholds. In the 1826 general election, relying on these freeholders, the Catholic Association nominated Stewart against Lord Beresford for County Waterford. The contest was soon decided by the return of the Catholic nominee; and County Monaghan, County Louth, and County Westmeath followed the lead of County Waterford.

The next year George Canning became premier, a consistent advocate of Catholic claims. When he joined Lord Liverpool's government in 1823, he insisted that emancipation should be an open question in the Cabinet, and on the Catholic Relief Bill of 1825 the spectacle was seen of Peel, the home secretary, voting on one side while Canning, the foreign secretary, was on the opposite side. As premier the latter was powerless in consequence of the hostility of the king; he died in August 1827. His successor, Goderich, held office only for a few months, and then, early in 1828 the Duke of Wellington became premier, with Robert Peel as his leader in the House of Commons.

These two were declared enemies of reform and emancipation, and instead of being willing to concede they would have wished to put down the Catholic Association by force. Catholics to the number of 800,000 petitioned Parliament for the repeal of the Test and Corporation Acts, which were repealed in 1828; and the same year in 1,500 parishes throughout Ireland meetings were held on the same day to petition for emancipation, and a million and a half Catholic signatures were obtained.

Wellington and Peel were still unyielding, and in the session of 1828 the latter opposed Sir Francis Burdett's motion in favour of emancipation, and Wellington helped to defeat it in the Lords. The Catholic Association answered with a resolution to oppose all Government candidates; and when William Vesey-FitzGerald, 2nd Baron FitzGerald and Vesey, on being promoted to the Cabinet, sought re-election in the 1828 County Clare by-election, a Catholic Association candidate was nominated against him. As no Catholic could sit in Parliament if elected, it was at first resolved to nominate Major Macnamara, a popular Protestant landlord of Clare; but after some hesitation he declined the contest. O'Connell himself determined to stand for Parliament.

The gentry and the larger freeholders were all with FitzGerald; the forty-shilling freeholders were with O'Connell, and influenced by the priests bade defiance to their landlords. O'Connell won the seat. Excitement grew, party passions were further inflamed, men's minds were constantly agitated by hopes and fears.

Wellington and Peel combined, and in March a Catholic Relief Bill was introduced, and in the following month passed into law as the Roman Catholic Relief Act 1829. Under its provisions Catholics were admitted to Parliament and to the corporations; but they were still excluded from some of the higher offices, civil and military, such as those of Lord Lieutenant of Ireland, Commander-in-chief of the Army, and Lord Chancellor both in England and Ireland; priests were forbidden to wear vestments outside their churches, and bishops to assume the titles of their dioceses; Jesuits were to leave the kingdom, and other religious orders were to be rendered incapable of receiving charitable bequests.

Under the Parliamentary Elections (Ireland) Act 1829, signed on the same day as the relief act, the franchise being raised to ten pounds, the forty-shilling freeholders were disfranchised. The relief act was not retrospective, O'Connell on coming to take his seat was tendered the old oath, which he refused. He was elected unopposed at the 1829 County Clare by-election.

== See also ==
- Catholic emancipation
