= Religion Act 1592 =

Act of the Parliament of England

- Act of Parliament
- Parliament of England
- Long title: An Act For the preventing and avoiding of such great inconveniencies and perils as might happen and grow by the wicked and dangerous practices of seditious sectaries and disloyal persons.
- Citation: 35 Eliz. 1. c. 1
- Territorial extent: England and Wales

Dates
- Royal assent: 10 April 1593
- Commencement: 18 February 1593 (Note: Start of session.)
- Repealed: 9 August 1844
Other legislation
Amended by	Continuance, etc. of Laws Act 1601; Continuance, etc. of Laws Act 1623; Continuance of Laws, etc. Act 1627
Repealed by	Roman Catholics Act 1844
Relates to	Conventicle Act 1664; Popish Recusants Act 1592

Status: Repealed

Text of statute as originally enacted

The Religion Act 1592 or the Seditious Sectaries Act 1592 or the Act Against Puritans 1592 or the Conventicle Act 1593 (35 Eliz. 1. c. 1) was an act of the Parliament of England. The act imprisoned without bail those over the age of sixteen who failed to attend Church; persuaded others to do the same; denied Queen Elizabeth I's authority in religious matters; and who attended unlawful religious meetings. The act was cognisable in the Court of High Commission. If, after offending, they did not conform in the next three months, they would be exiled from England forever. The act fined those who harboured recusants £10 for every month hidden. The act stated that it would continue no longer than the end of the next session of Parliament. However, the act was still in effect in 1661, when John Bunyan was tried and convicted for disobedience to it.

== Subsequent developments ==
The act was continued until the end of the first session of the next session by the Continuance, etc. of Laws Act 1601 (43 Eliz. 1. c. 9), the Continuance, etc. of Laws Act 1623 (21 Jas. 1. c. 28) and the Continuance of Laws, etc. Act 1627 (3 Cha. 1 . c. 5).

Towards the end of 1680, during the Exclusion Crisis, Parliament passed a Bill for repealing the act. However, on the day of the proroguing of Parliament (10 January 1681), when the Bill ought to have been presented to Charles II to sign, he instructed the Clerk of the Crown to withdraw the Bill.

As late as 1683 the act was being used against a Quaker meeting in 'Gratious' Street (Gracechurch Street), London.

The whole act was repealed by section 1 of the Roman Catholics Act 1844 (7 & 8 Vict. c. 102), which came into force on 9 August 1844.
