= Dromgoole =

Dromgoole is a surname. Notable people with the surname include:

- Dominic Dromgoole (born 1964), English theatre director, and brother of Jessica
- Jessica Dromgoole, English theatre director, and sister of Dominic
- George Dromgoole (1797–1847), politician and lawyer from Virginia
- Thomas Dromgoole, Irish physician
- Will Allen Dromgoole (1860–1934), Tennessee author and poet
