= Popery Act 1627 =

Act of the Parliament of England

- Act of Parliament
- Parliament of England
- Long title: An Act to restrain the passing or sending of any to be Popishly bred beyond the Seas.
- Citation: 3 Cha. 1. c. 3
- Territorial extent: England and Wales

Dates
- Royal assent: 10 March 1629
- Commencement: 10 March 1629 (Note: Section 1. End of session.)
- Repealed: 9 August 1844
Other legislation
Repealed by	Roman Catholics Act 1844

Status: Repealed

Text of statute as originally enacted

The Popery Act 1627 (3 Cha. 1. c. 3) was an act of the Parliament of England. Its long title is "An Act to restrain the passing or sending of any to be Popishly bred beyond the Seas". This was the only penal law to be passed during the reign of Charles I.

The act declared:

Forasmuch as divers ill affected Persons to the true Religion within this Realm, had sent their Children into Foreign Parts to be bred up in Popery, notwithstanding the Restraint of it by 1 Jac. 1. It was enacted, That that Law should be put in Execution; and further, that if any Person or Persons, being Subjects, should pass over, or go, convey, or send, or cause to be sent or conveyed, any Children, or other Person beyond Seas, to the Intent and Purpose to enter into, or be resident or trained up in any Priory, Abbey, Nunnery, Popish University, Colledge or School, or Houses of Jesuits, Priests, or in any Private Popish Family, and shall be there, by any Jesuite, Seminary Priest, Friar, Monk, or other Popish Person instructed, perswaded [sic] or strengthned [sic] in the Popish Religion in any sort to profess the same; or should convey or send, or cause to be conveyed, or sent any sum or other thing towards the maintenance of any already gone or sent under any Pretence of Charity, or otherwise, &c. is disabled to sue, to be Commitee [sic] of any Ward, or Executor or Administrator; is not capable of any Legacy or Deed of Gift, or to bear any Office within the Realm; forfeits all his Goods and Chattels, forfeits his Lands and other real Estate for his Life. In case of Conformity, these Penalties are not to be incurred; and in case the Lands have been seised [sic], they shall be restored.

== Subsequent developments ==
The whole act was repealed by section 1 of the Roman Catholics Act 1844 (7 & 8 Vict. c. 102), which came into force on 9 August 1844.
