= Catholic Rent =

The Catholic rent was a subscription, amounting to a minimum one penny per month and a maximum of two shillings which was paid to the Catholic Association in Ireland with the aim of raising funds. This tactic was proposed by Daniel O'Connell in February 1824 to raise money for his campaign to gain Catholic Emancipation i.e., the right for Catholics to hold positions from which they were still excluded following the previous Catholic Relief Acts. Its creation led O’Connell to claim that 'The Catholic rent will surely emancipate us'

In addition to the raising of revenues, the establishment of Catholic Rent was motivated by the need to refute the idea that the Catholic Association represented only a small elite of Irish Catholics. With membership initially being relatively small and membership fees amounting to one guinea per year, O’Connell felt it necessary to create a new category of associate member which could include a larger amount of the public.

Its creation facilitated the creation of a larger network of local agents and committees across the nation, allowing the Catholic Association to differ from previous Catholic advocacy groups in its social makeup. While the Catholic Association initially consisted of merchants, professionals and landowners, the affordability of Catholic rent facilitated its evolution into a popular movement, leading to its suppression in March 1825 under the Unlawful Societies (Ireland) Act. This necessitated the formation of the New Catholic Association in July that year.

The rent also revitalised Catholic politics in Ireland, fostering strong commitment among the population when it had previously been apathetic.

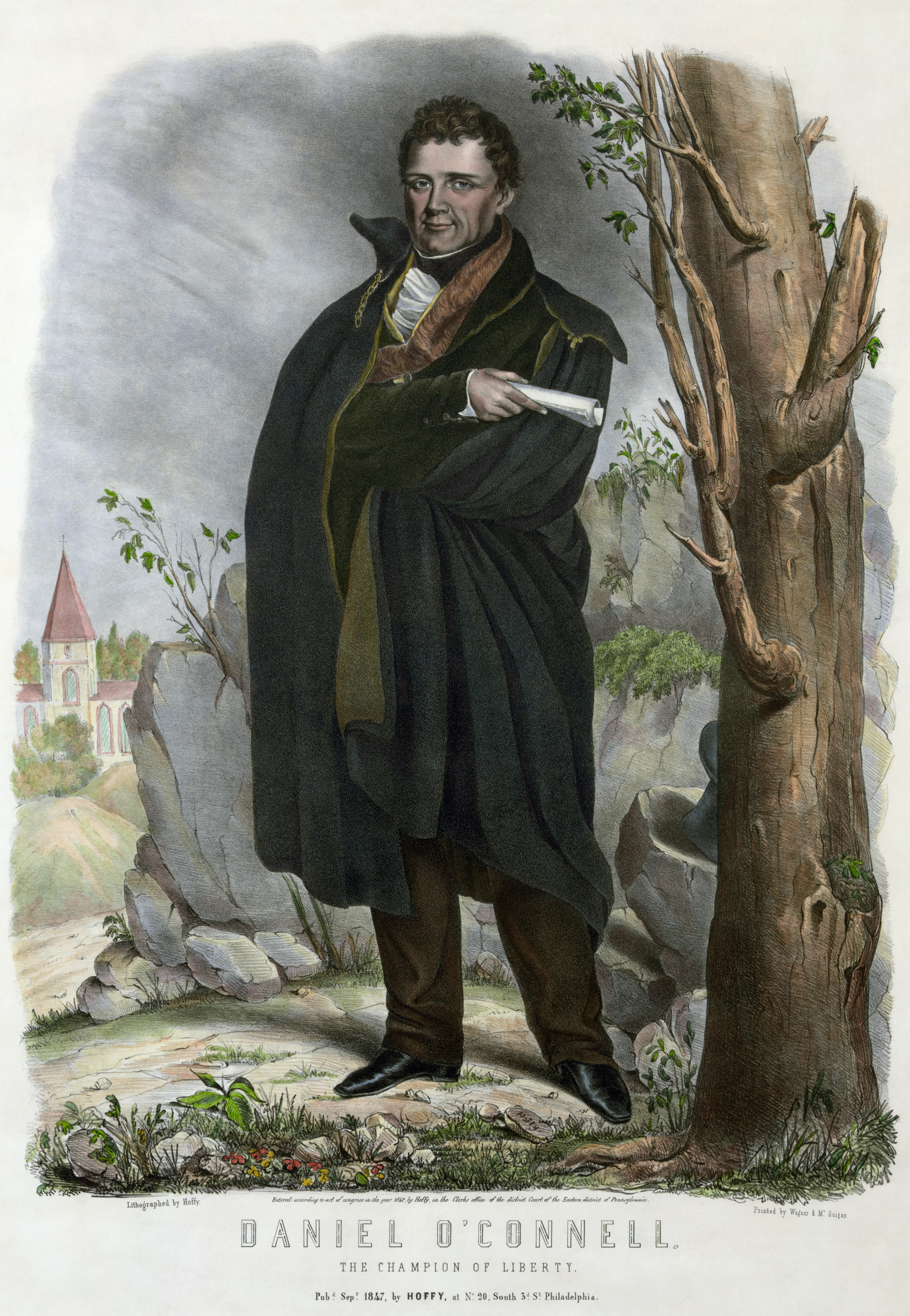
"Daniel O'Connell: The Champion of Liberty" poster published in Pennsylvania, 1847

== Creation ==
The idea was introduced in February 1824 due to the inability for the Catholic Association to achieve a quorum of ten members so that the proceedings of its meetings could be valid. Patrick M. Geoghegan notes that the idea had precedent, with Viscount Kenmare having suggested a national subscription in the 1780s while advocating Catholic relief, and O’Connell having attempted a temporary subscription in 1812.

While the plan was initially doubted by some, with John O’Connell having been teased about his father's 'penny-a-month plan for liberating Ireland', O’Connell insisted from the outset that the rent could raise £50,000.

The Catholic rent was collected through the parish structure, allowing it to reach as many Irish Catholics as possible and activate them politically.

== Revenue ==
By the end of 1824, the Catholic rent earned an average of £1000 each week. Before the suppression of the Catholic Association in March 1825, The Catholic rent had collected about £17,000. £7000 of this came from Leinster and £6500 came from Munster. Between 1826 and 1829 (emancipation year), a ‘New Catholic Rent’ brought in another £35,000.

== Impact ==
The Catholic Association spent part of the Catholic rent on advertisements in the English and Irish press, with Daniel O’Connell having made this a priority. As well as transforming Catholic political advocacy into a nationwide mass-movement when it had previously been relegated to elite Dublin circles, the collection of the Catholic rent in Catholic parishes contributed to a profound long-term implication of the Catholic clergy in Irish political activity. This continued beyond 1829 (emancipation year), particularly with the younger generation of prelates who had been trained in Ireland. Among them, John Machale, the bishop of Killala, viewed the British state and Irish Protestants as "equally and unambiguously the enemy" according to Colin Barr.
