= Roman Catholics Act 1844 =

Act of the Parliament of the United Kingdom

- Act of Parliament
- Parliament of the United Kingdom
- Long title: An Act to repeal certain Penal Enactments made against Her Majesty's Roman Catholic Subjects.
- Citation: 7 & 8 Vict. c. 102
- Territorial extent: United Kingdom

Dates
- Royal assent: 9 August 1844
- Commencement: 9 August 1844 (Note: Section 1.)
- Repealed: 7 August 1874
Other legislation
Amends	See § Repealed enactments
Repeals/revokes	See § Repealed enactments
Repealed by	Statute Law Revision Act 1874 (No. 2)
Relates to	Roman Catholic Relief Act 1829; Religious Disabilities Act 1846

Status: Repealed

Text of statute as originally enacted

The Roman Catholics Act 1844 (7 & 8 Vict. c. 102), also known as the Roman Catholic Penal Acts Repeal Act 1844, was an act of the Parliament of the United Kingdom that repealed enactments relating to anti-Catholicism in the United Kingdom.

== Passage ==
The bill was criticised by Charles James Blomfield, the Bishop of London, for allegedly establishing the supremacy of the Pope in the United Kingdom.

== Provisions ==
=== Repealed enactments ===
Section 1 of the act repealed 23 enactments, listed in that section.

Citation	Short title	Long title	Extent of repeal
5 & 6 Edw. 6. c. 1	Act of Uniformity 1551	An act passed in the sixth year of the reign of King Edward the Sixth, intituled 'An Act for the Uniformity of Service and Administration of Sacraments throughout the Realm'.	As relates to the offence of willingly and wittingly hearing and being present at any other manner or form of common prayer, of administration of the sacraments, of making of ministers in the churches, or of any other rites contained in the book annexed to that act, than is mentioned and set forth in such book, so far as the same in any manner affects Roman catholics.
1 Eliz. 1. c. 1	Act of Supremacy 1558	An act passed in the first year of the reign of Queen Elizabeth, intituled 'An Act to restore to the Crown the ancient Jurisdiction over the Estate, ecclesiastical and spiritual, and abolishing all Foreign Powers repugnant to the same'.	Whereby, after the following enactment, 'that if any person or persons dwelling or inhabiting within this your realm, or in any other your highnesses realms or dominions, of what estate, dignity, or degree soever he or they be, after the end of thirty days next after the determination of this session of this present parliament, shall, by writing, printing, teaching, preaching, express words, deed, or act, advisedly, maliciously, and directly affirm, hold, stand with, set forth, maintain, or defend the authority, preheminence, power, or jurisdiction, spiritual or ecclesiastical, of any foreign prince, prelate, person, state, or potentate whatsoever, heretofore claimed, used, or usurped within this realm, or any dominion or country being within or under the power, dominion, or obeysance of your highness, or shall advisedly, maliciously, and directly put in ure or execute anything for the extolling, advancement, setting forth, maintenance, or defence of any such pretended or usurped jurisdiction, power, preheminence, and authority, or any part thereof, that then every such person and persons so doing and offending, their abettors, aiders, procurors, and counsellors, being thereof lawfully convicted and attainted, according to the due order and course of the common laws of this realm, for his or their first offence shall forfeit and lose unto your highness, your heirs and successors, all his and their goods and chattels, as well real as personal; and if any such person so convicted or attainted shall not have or be worth of his proper goods and chattels to the value of twenty pounds at the time of his conviction or attainder, that then every such person so convicted or attainted, over and besides the forfeiture of all his said goods and chattels, shall have and suffer imprisonment by the space of one whole year, without bail or mainprise; it is enacted, 'that if any such offender or offenders, after such conviction or attainder, do eftsoons commit or do the said offences or any of them in manner and form aforesaid, and be thereof duly convicted and attainted as is aforesaid, that then every such offender and offenders shall for the same second offence incur into the dangers, penalties, and forfeitures ordained and provided by the Statute of Provision and Premunire made in the sixteenth year of the reign of King Richard the Second; and if any such offender or offenders, at any time after the said second conviction and attainder, do the third time commit and do the said offences in any of them in manner and form aforesaid, and be thereof duly convicted a attainted as is aforesaid, that then every such offence or offences shall be deemed and adjudged high treason; and that the offender or offenders there being thereof lawfully convicted and attainted according to the laws of the realm, shall suffer pains of death, and other penalties forfeitures, and losses, as in cases of high treason by the laws of this realm'.
1 Eliz. 1. c. 2	Act of Uniformity 1558	An act made and passed in the said first year of the reign of the said Queen Elizabeth, intituled 'An Act for the Uniformity of Common Prayer and Service in the Church, and Administration of the Sacraments'.	Whereby it is enacted, 'that all and every person and persons inhabiting within this realm or any other the queen's majesty's dominions shall diligently and faithfully, having no lawful or reasonable excuse to be absent, endeavour themselves to resort to their parish church or chapel accustomed, or upon reasonable let thereof to some usual place where common prayer and such service ofGod shall be used in such time of let, upon every Sunday and other days ordained and used to be kept as holy days, and then and there to abide orderly and soberly during the time of the common prayer, preaching, or other service of God there to be used and ministered,' upon the pains, penalties, and punishments therein mentioned, so far as these enactments of the last-mentioned act relate to or affect Roman catholics.
5 Eliz. 1. c. 1	Supremacy of the Crown Act 1562	An act passed in the fifth year of the reign of the said Queen Elizabeth, intituled 'An Act for the Assurance of the Queen's Royal Power over all Estates and Subjects within her Dominions'.	As renders any person violating its provisions liable to the penalties of treason, or of the Statute of Præmunire.
23 Eliz. 1. c. 1	Religion Act 1580	An act passed in the twenty-third year of the reign of the said Queen Elizabeth, intituled, ' An Act to retain the Queen's Majesty's Subjects in their due Obedience'.	The whole act.
27 Eliz. 1. c. 2	Jesuits, etc. Act 1584	An act passed in the twenty-seventh year of the reign of the said Queen Elizabeth, intituled, 'An Act against Jesuits, Seminary Priests, and other such like disobedient Persons'.	The whole act.
29 Eliz. 1. c. 6 (Note: This is the citation in The Statutes of the Realm.)	Religion Act 1586	An act passed in the twenty-ninth year of the reign of the said Queen Elizabeth, intituled, 'An Act for the more speedy and due Execution of certain Branches of the Statute made in the twenty-third year of the Queen's Majesty's Reign, intituled, "An Act to retain the Queen's Majesty's Subjects in their due Obedience"'.	As relates to or in any manner affects Roman catholics.
35 Eliz. 1. c. 1	Religion Act 1592	An act passed in the thirty-fifth year of the reign of the said Queen Elizabeth, intituled, 'An Act to retain the Queen's Majesty's Subjects in their due Obedience'.	The whole act.
35 Eliz. 1. c. 2	Popish Recusants Act 1592	An act passed in the said thirty-fifth year of the reign of the said Queen Elizabeth, intituled, ' An Act for restraining Popish Recusants to some certain Places of Abode'.	The whole act.
1 Jas. 1. c. 4	Jesuits etc. Act 1603	An act passed in the first year of the reign of King James the First, intituled, 'An Act for the due Execution of the Statutes against Jesuits, Seminary Priests, Recusants,' &c.	Except as relates to the keeping any school, or to the being a schoolmaster, or to the retaining or maintaining a schoolmaster.
3 Jas. 1. c. 1	Observance of 5th November Act 1605	An act passed in the third year of the reign of the said King James the First, intituled, 'An Act for a public Thanksgiving to Almighty God every Year on the Fifth of November'.	Whereby it is enacted, ' that all and every person and persons inhabiting within this realm of England and the dominions of the same shall always upon that day diligently and faithfully resort to the parish church or chapel accustomed, or to some usual church or chapel where the said morning prayer, preaching, or other service of God shall be used, and then and there to abide orderly and soberly during the time of the said prayers, preaching, or other service of God then to be used and ministered,' as relates to or in any manner affects Roman catholics.
3 Jas. 1. c. 4	Popish Recusants Act 1605	An act passed in the said third year of the reign of the said King James the First, intituled, 'An Act for the better discovering and repressing of Popish Recusants'.	As relate to popish recusants, to the treasons created by the same act, and to the compelling any Roman catholic to resort to the church of the parish where he or she shall most usually abide or be within the year, and to receive the sacrament of the Lord's supper.
3 Jas. 1. c. 5	Presentation of Benefices Act 1605	Another act passed in the said third year of the reign of the said King James the First, intituled, 'An Act to prevent and avoid Dangers which grow by Popish Recusants'.	Except whereby it is enacted, 'that every person or persons that is or shall be a popish recusant convict during the time tha the shall be or remain a recusant shall from and after the end of the then present session of parliament be utterly disabled to present to any benefice with cure or without cure, prebend or other ecclesiastical living, or to collate or nominate to any free school, hospital, or donative whatsoever, and from the beginning of the then present session of parliament shall likewise be disabled to grant any avoidance to any benefice, prebend, or other ecclesiastical living,' and which specify the counties, cities, and other places and limits or precincts within which the chancellor and scholars of the university of Oxford and the chancellor and scholars of the university of Cambridge respectively have the presentation, nomination, collation, and donation of and to every such benefice, prebend, living, school, hospital, and donative as shall happen to be void during such time as a patron thereof shall be and remain a recusant convict as aforesaid; and whereby it is provided, 'that neither of the said chancellors and scholars of either of the said universities shall present or nominate to any benefice with cure, prebend, or other ecclesiastical living, any such person as shall then have any other benefice with cure of souls, and if any such presentation or nomination shall be had or made of any such person so beneficed, the said presentation or nomination shall be void, anything in this act to the contrary notwithstanding'.
7 Jas. 1. c. 6	Oath of Allegiance, etc. Act 1609	An act passed in the seventh year of the reign of the said King James the First, intituled, 'An Act for administering the Oath of Allegiance and Reformation of Married Women Recusants'.	As relates to recusants or to the penalties of recusancy.
3 Cha. 1. c. 3	Popery Act 1627	An act passed in the third year of the reign of King Charles the First, intituled 'An Act to restrain the passing or sending of any to be popishly bred beyond the seas'.	The whole act.
3 Cha. 1. c. 4	Continuance of Laws, etc. Act 1627	Also so much and such parts of two acts respectively, the one passed in the third year of the reign of the said King Charles the First, and intituled, 'An Act for Continuance and Repeal of divers Statutes'.	As in any manner affect Roman catholics.
16 Cha. 1. c. 4	Taxation (No. 3) Act 1640	Also so much and such parts of two acts respectively, the other passed in the sixteenth year of the said last-mentioned reign, and intituled, 'An Act for the further Relief of His Majesty's Army and the Northern Parts of the Kingdom', relating to the continuance of an act made in the thirty-fifth year of the reign of Queen Elizabeth, intituled, 'An Act to retain the Queen's Majesty's Subjects in their due Obedience'.	As in any manner affect Roman catholics.
13 & 14 Cha. 2. c. 4	Act of Uniformity 1662	An act passed in the thirteenth and fourteenth years of the reign ofKing Charles the Second, intituled, 'An Act for the Uniformity of Publique Prayers andAdministration of Sacraments and other Rites and Ceremonies; and for establishing the Form of making, ordaining, and consecrating Bishops, Priests, and Deacons in the Church of England'.	As confirms any act or part of any act hereby repealed.
25 Cha. 2. c. 2	Popish Recusants Act 1672	An act passed in the twenty-fifth year of the reign of the said King Charles the Second, intituled, 'An Act for preventing Dangers which may happen from Popish Recusants, whereby it is enacted,'that if any person or persons, not bred up by his or their parent or parents from their infancy in the popish religion, and professing themselves to be popish recusants, shall breed up, instruct, or educate his or their child or children, or suffer them to be instructed or educated, in the popish religion, every such person being thereof convicted shall be from thenceforth disabled of bearing any office or place of trust or profit in church or state'.	Whereby it is enacted, 'that all such children as shall be so brought up, instructed, or educated, are and shalbe thereby disabled of bearing any such office or place of trust or profit and they shall be perfectly reconciled and converted to the church ofEd and shall take the oaths of supremacy and allegiance aforesaid before the justices of the peace in the open quarter sessions of the count yor place where they shall inhabit, and thereupon receive the sacrament of the Lord's supper after the usage of the church ofEngland, and obtain a certificate thereof under the hands of two or more of the said justices of the peace'.
1 Will. & Mar. c. 8	Oaths of Allegiance and Supremacy Act 1688	An act passed in the first session of parliament in the first year of the reign of King William the Third and Queen Mary, intituled, 'An Act for the abrogating of the Oaths of Supremacy and Allegiance, and appointing other Oaths'.	As renders liable any person or persons who shall refuse to take the oaths therein mentioned, or either of them, to imprisonment, fine, and disability to hold any office, civil or military, within this kingdom. As renders liable any person or persons who shall refuse to make and subscribe the declaration therein mentioned to the pains, penalties, forfeitures, and disabilities of and to be taken and deemed a popish recusant convict.
1 Will. & Mar. c. 9	Papists Act 1688	An act passed in the said first session in the said first year f the reign of the said King William the Third and the said Queen Mary, intituled, 'An Act for the amoving Papists and reputed Papists from the Cities of London and Westminster, and Ten Miles Distance from the same'.	The whole act.
1 Will. & Mar. c. 15	Papists (No. 2) Act 1688	Another act passed in the said first session and first year, intituled, 'An Act for the better securing the Government by disarming Papists and reputed Papists'.	The whole act.,
1 Will. & Mar. c. 17	Papists (Amendment) Act 1688	Another act passed in the said first session and first year, intituled, 'An Act for rectifying a Mistake in a certain Act of this present Parliament, for amoving Papists from the Cities of London and Westminster'.	The whole act.

== Subsequent developments ==
The whole act was repealed by section 1 of, and the schedule to, the Statute Law Revision Act 1874 (No. 2) (37 & 38 Vict. c. 96), which came into force on 9 August 1844.

== See also ==
- 1844 in religion
