= Simony Act 1588 =

Act of the Parliament of England

Simony Act 1588 (Note: The citation of this act by this short title was authorised by section 5 of, and the second schedule to, the Statute Law Revision Act 1948. Due to the repeal of those provisions, it is now authorised by section 19(2) of the Interpretation Act 1978.)
- Act of Parliament
- Parliament of England
- Long title: An Acte against Abuses in Election of Scollers and presentacions to Benefices. (Note: These words are printed against this act in the second column of the second schedule to the Statute Law Revision Act 1948, which is headed "Title".)
- Citation: 31 Eliz. 1. c. 6
- Territorial extent: England and Wales

Dates
- Royal assent: 29 March 1589
- Commencement: 4 February 1589 (Note: Start of session.)
Other legislation
Amended by	Statute Law Revision Act 1888; Statute Law Revision Act 1948; Common Informers Act 1951; Patronage (Benefices) Measure 1986; Statute Law (Repeals) Measure 2018
Relates to	Simony Act 1688

Status: Amended

Text of statute as originally enacted

Revised text of statute as amended

Text of the Simony Act 1588 as in force today (including any amendments) within the United Kingdom, from legislation.gov.uk.

The Simony Act 1588 (31 Eliz. 1. c. 6) is an act of the Parliament of England that stipulates penalties for simony (the act of selling church offices and roles or sacred things), an offence under the ecclesiastical law of the Church of England.

As of 2026, the act remains largely in force in England and Wales.

Under section 4 of the act, an unlawfully bestowed office can be declared void by the Crown, and the offender can be disabled from making future appointments and fined up to £1,000. Clergy are no longer required to make a declaration as to simony on ordination but offences are now likely to be dealt with as "misconduct" under the Clergy Discipline Measure 2003 (2003 No. 3), r.8.

== Subsequent developments ==
Sections 4 and 5 of the act, in so far as they impose a penalty by reference to the value of an ecclesiastical living, were repealed by section 1 of, and part 1 of the schedule to, the Statute Law (Repeals) Measure 2018, which came into force on 1 July 2018.

== See also ==
- Simony

== Bibliography ==
- Lord Mackay of Clashfern (ed.) (2002) Halsbury's Laws of England, 4th ed., Vol.14, "Ecclesiastical Law", 832 'Penalties and disability on simony'
- — 1359 'Simony' (see also current updates)
