= Oaths of Allegiance and Supremacy Act 1688 =

Act of the Parliament of England

- Act of Parliament
- Parliament of England
- Long title: An Act for the Abrogating of the Oathes of Supremacy and Allegiance and Appointing other Oathes.
- Citation: 1 Will. & Mar. c. 8 (Note: This is the citation in The Statutes of the Realm.); 1 Will. & Mar. Sess. 1. c. 8 (Note: This is the citation in The Statutes at Large.)
- Territorial extent: England and Wales

Dates
- Royal assent: 24 April 1689
- Commencement: 13 February 1689 (Note: Start of session.)
- Repealed: 13 July 1871
Other legislation
Amended by	Roman Catholics Act 1844; Statute Law Revision Act 1867
Repealed by	Promissory Oaths Act 1871
Relates to	Coronation Oath Act 1688; Oaths Act 1688; Lords Justices Act 1837; Regency Act 1840

Status: Repealed

Text of statute as originally enacted

Oaths Act 1688
- Act of Parliament
- Parliament of England
- Long title: An Act to Regulate the Administracion of the Oathes required to be taken by Commission or Warrant Officers imployed in their Majestyes Service by Land by Vertue of an Act made this present Session of Parliament Entituled An Act for the Abrogating of the Oaths of Supremacy and Allegiance and appointing other Oaths.
- Citation: 1 Will. & Mar. c. 25; 1 Will. & Mar. Sess. 1. c. 25
- Territorial extent: England and Wales

Dates
- Royal assent: 25 July 1689
- Commencement: 13 February 1689
- Repealed: 15 July 1867
Other legislation
Repealed by	Statute Law Revision Act 1867
Relates to	Coronation Oath Act 1688; Oaths of Allegiance and Supremacy Act 1688

Status: Repealed

Text of statute as originally enacted

The Oaths of Allegiance and Supremacy Act 1688 (1 Will. & Mar. c. 8) was an act of the Parliament of England passed in the aftermath of the Glorious Revolution that required all office-holders, Members of Parliament and clergy to take the oaths of allegiance and supremacy for the new monarchs, William III and Mary II. The Archbishop of Canterbury, William Sancroft, five bishops and approximately four hundred lower clergy refused to take the oaths because they believed their oaths to James II were still valid. The act thus triggered the nonjuring schism in the Church of England. The non-jurors were deprived of their offices.

== Subsequent developments ==
Section 3 from "All and every Arch-Bishop" to end of that section, sections 6–8, ten, and 14 to the end of the act, were repealed by section 1 of, and the schedule to, the Statute Law Revision Act 1867 (30 & 31 Vict. c. 59), which came into force on 15 July 1867.

The whole act was repealed by section 1 of, and part I of schedule one to, the Promissory Oaths Act 1871 (34 & 35 Vict. c. 48), which came into force on 13 July 1871.

== See also ==
- Oath of Allegiance (United Kingdom)
- Oath of Supremacy
