= Presentation of Benefices Act 1688 =

Act of the Parliament of England

Presentation of Benefices Act 1688 (Note: The citation of this act by this short title was authorised by section 5 of, and the second schedule to, the Statute Law Revision Act 1948. Due to the repeal of those provisions, it is now authorised by section 19(2) of the Interpretation Act 1978.)
- Act of Parliament
- Parliament of England
- Long title: An Act to vest in the two Universities the Presentations of Benefices belonging to Papists. (Note: These words are printed against this act in the second column of the second schedule to the Statute Law Revision Act 1948, which is headed "Title".)
- Citation: 1 Will. & Mar. c. 26 (Note: This is the citation in The Statutes of the Realm.); 1 Will. & Mar. Sess. 1. c. 26 (Note: This is the citation in The Statutes at Large.)
- Territorial extent: England and Wales

Dates
- Royal assent: 25 July 1689
- Commencement: 13 February 1689 (Note: Start of session.)
- Repealed: 1 January 1989
Other legislation
Amended by	Residence of Incumbents Act 1869
Repealed by	Patronage (Benefices) Measure 1986

Status: Repealed

Text of statute as originally enacted

The Presentation of Benefices Act 1688 (1 Will. & Mar. c. 26) was an act of the Parliament of England. It applied to the University of Oxford and the University of Cambridge.

== Subsequent developments ==
Section 1 and section 2 from "Provided nevertheless" to end of that section, were repealed by section 1 of, and the schedule to, the Statute Law Revision Act 1867 (30 & 31 Vict. c. 59), which came into force on 15 July 1867.

The whole act was repealed by section 41(2) of, and schedule 5 to, the Patronage (Benefices) Measure 1986, which came into force on 1 January 1989.
