= Coronation Oath Act 1688 =

Act of the Parliament of England

Coronation Oath Act 1688 (Note: The citation of this act by this short title was authorised by section 5 of, and the second schedule to, the Statute Law Revision Act 1948. Due to the repeal of those provisions, it is now authorised by section 19(2) of the Interpretation Act 1978.)
- Act of Parliament
- Parliament of England
- Long title: An Act for Establishing the Coronation Oath. (Note: These words are printed against this act in the second column of the second schedule to the Statute Law Revision Act 1948, which is headed "Title".)
- Citation: 1 Will. & Mar. c. 6 (Note: This is the citation in The Statutes of the Realm.); 1 Will. & Mar. Sess. 1. c. 6 (Note: This is the citation in The Statutes at Large.)
- Territorial extent: England and Wales

Dates
- Royal assent: 9 April 1689
- Commencement: 13 February 1689 (Note: Start of session.)

Other legislation
- Amended by: Statute Law Revision Act 1888; Statute Law Revision Act 1948
- Relates to: Oaths of Allegiance and Supremacy Act 1688; Oaths Act 1688; Act of Settlement 1701; Accession Declaration Act 1910

Status: Amended

Text of statute as originally enacted

Revised text of statute as amended

Text of the Coronation Oath Act 1688 as in force today (including any amendments) within the United Kingdom, from legislation.gov.uk.

The Coronation Oath Act 1688 (1 Will. & Mar. c. 6) is an act of the Parliament of England. It was passed in 1689.

The preamble noted that "by the Law and Ancient Usage of this Realm" the monarchs of England had taken a solemn oath at their coronation to maintain the statute laws and customs of the country and of its inhabitants, but the text of this oath had become partly meaningless over time, "framed in doubtful Words and Expressions with relation to ancient Laws and Constitutions at this time unknown". It established a single uniform oath to be taken by future monarchs at their coronation, and also established that this oath was to be taken by William III and Mary II when they were crowned.

The oath was fundamentally different from the traditional coronation oath which recognized laws as being the grant of the king whereas the act's oath sought to bind the king to rule according to the law agreed in Parliament. At the forefront of the oath, then, is the distillation of the core principle of the Glorious Revolution of 1688, namely an assertion of the constitutional supremacy of Parliament, a principle that remains the basis of public law in the United Kingdom.

The oath was shorter than the one used in 1660, removing a number of awkward phrases and references to past monarchs; a significant alteration was the explicit inclusion of an oath to maintain "the true Profession of the Gospel and the Protestant Reformed Religion Established by Law", rather than the somewhat more vague promise to "Protect and Defend the Bishops and Churches under [my] Government."

Section 2 of the Act of Settlement 1701 (12 & 13 Will. 3. c. 2) reiterated the requirement to take the oath.

== Subsequent developments ==
As of 2025, the act mostly remains in force.

Section 4, from "bee it" to "enacted that" was repealed by section 1(1) of, and part I of the schedule to, the Statute Law Revision Act 1888 (51 & 52 Vict. c. 3). The Scottish Claim of Right Act 1689 says that the monarch cannot "exercise the regal power until he or she swear the Coronation Oath."

== See also ==
- Accession Declaration Act 1910
