= Habeas Corpus Suspension Acts of 1688 =

Act of the Parliament of England

Habeas Corpus Suspension Act 1688
- Act of Parliament
- Parliament of England
- Long title: An Act for Impowering His Majestie to Apprehend and Detaine such Persons as He shall finde just Cause to Suspect are Conspireing against the Government.
- Citation: 1 Will. & Mar. c. 2 (Note: This is the citation in The Statutes of the Realm.); 1 Will. & Mar. Sess. 1. c. 2 (Note: This is the citation in The Statutes at Large.)
- Territorial extent: England and Wales

Dates
- Royal assent: 16 March 1689
- Commencement: 13 February 1689 (Note: Start of session.)
- Expired: 17 April 1689 (Note: Section 3.)
- Repealed: 15 July 1867
Other legislation
Repealed by	Statute Law Revision Act 1867
Relates to	Habeas Corpus Suspension (No. 2) Act 1688; Habeas Corpus Suspension (No. 3) Act 1688

Status: Repealed

Text of statute as originally enacted

Habeas Corpus Suspension (No. 2) Act 1688
- Act of Parliament
- Parliament of England
- Long title: An Act for Impowering His Majestie to Apprehend and Detaine such Persons as He shall finde Just Cause to Suspect are Conspireing against the Government.
- Citation: 1 Will. & Mar. c. 7; 1 Will. & Mar. Sess. 1. c. 7
- Territorial extent: England and Wales

Dates
- Royal assent: 24 April 1689
- Commencement: 25 April 1689 (Note: Section 1.)
- Expired: 25 May 1689 (Note: Section 3.)
- Repealed: 15 July 1867
Other legislation
Repealed by	Statute Law Revision Act 1867
Relates to	Habeas Corpus Suspension Act 1688; Habeas Corpus Suspension (No. 3) Act 1688

Status: Repealed

Text of statute as originally enacted

Habeas Corpus Suspension (No. 3) Act 1688
- Act of Parliament
- Parliament of England
- Long title: An Act for Impowering Their Majestyes to Committ without Baile such Persons as They shall finde Just Cause to suspect are Conspireing against the Government.
- Citation: 1 Will. & Mar. c. 19; 1 Wil. & Mar. Sess. 1. c. 19
- Territorial extent: England and Wales

Dates
- Royal assent: 28 May 1689
- Commencement: 25 May 1689 (Note: Section 1.)
- Expired: 23 October 1689 (Note: Section 1.)
- Repealed: 15 July 1867
Other legislation
Repealed by	Statute Law Revision Act 1867
Relates to	Habeas Corpus Suspension Act 1688; Habeas Corpus Suspension (No. 2) Act 1688

Status: Repealed

Text of statute as originally enacted

The Habeas Corpus Suspension Acts of 1688 were three acts of the Parliament of England (1 Will. & Mar. cc. 2, 7 & 19) which temporarily suspended the right of habeas corpus in England until 17 April, 25 May and 23 October 1689 respectively. They were passed in the wake of the Glorious Revolution, in which King James II had recently been deposed.

The three acts were very similar. They each provided that any six members of the Privy Council could sign a warrant committing to prison anyone they suspected of high treason, without bail, mainprise or trial, until the date the act expired or unless six privy counsellors signed an order permitting their bail or trial. The acts did not allow the imprisonment of any member of either House of Parliament, unless the House that member belonged to first gave its consent to his imprisonment.

== Subsequent developments ==
The whole of the three acts were repealed by section 1 of, and the schedule to, the Statute Law Revision Act 1867 (30 & 31 Vict. c. 59), which came into force on 15 July 1867.

== See also ==
- Habeas Corpus Suspension Act
- Jacobitism
- High treason in the United Kingdom
