= Catholic Association =

19th century campaign for Catholic emancipation in Great Britain

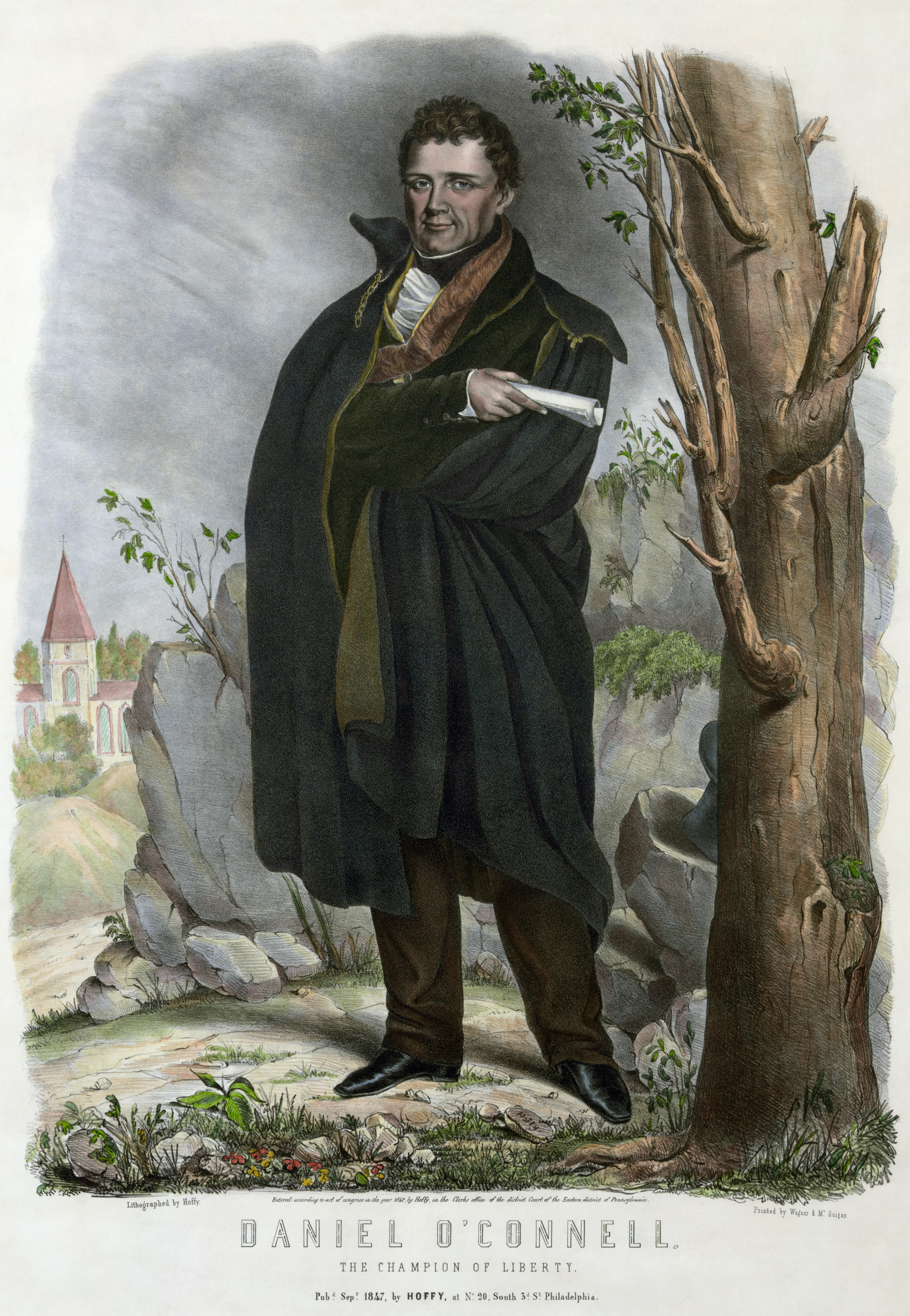
"Daniel O'Connell: The Champion of Liberty" poster published in Pennsylvania, 1847

The Catholic Association was an Irish Roman Catholic political organization set up by Daniel O'Connell in the early nineteenth century to campaign for Catholic emancipation within the United Kingdom of Great Britain and Ireland. It was one of the first mass-membership political movements in Europe. It organized large-scale public protests in Ireland. Home Secretary (later Prime Minister) Robert Peel was alarmed and warned an associate of his in 1824, "We cannot tamely sit by while the danger is hourly increasing, while a power co-ordinate with that of the government is rising by its side, nay, daily counteracting its views." The Duke of Wellington, Britain's prime minister and its most famous war hero, told Peel, "If we cannot get rid of the Catholic Association, we must look to civil war in Ireland sooner or later." To stop the momentum of the Catholic Association it was necessary to pass Catholic Emancipation, and so Wellington and Peel turned enough Tory votes to win. Passage demonstrated that the veto power long held by the Ultra-Tories faction of reactionary Tories no longer was operational, and significant reforms were now possible.

== Foundation ==
The Catholic Association was founded in 1823 by Daniel O'Connell. It was the latest in a series of similar associations formed over the previous ten years or so; none of these had prospered. Like the other associations, this new association was composed mainly of the middle-class elite: an annual subscription amounting to a guinea, an amount equivalent to what an average farmer would pay for six months' rent. In 1824, the Catholic Association began to use the money that it had raised to campaign for Catholic emancipation.

== Catholic Rent ==
In 1824 the association created a new category of associate members at the cost of a penny a month, the so-called Catholic Rent. The reasoning behind the creation of this new membership category was to stimulate a swelling in association numbers. This new, cheaper category ensured Catholics from a poorer background could join, and thus the association's initial class-based entry barriers were removed. The Catholic rent transformed the association and Catholic political advocacy more broadly. In terms of the association, the rent catalyzed a transformation in a number of ways. Firstly, as previously mentioned, it gave the Catholic Association a constant source of money, which enabled Daniel O'Connell to run a consistent campaign. Secondly, it facilitated easy calculation of total association membership numbers so that O'Connell could say with confidence that he had the support of so many people. This was important as it could be used to apply pressure against the British government. Third, and perhaps most importantly, however, it announced the arrival of mass mobilization politics, being the first such populist movement in Europe. Daniel O'Connell decided to add this additional membership level, at a reduced price of a penny a month, deliberately. The benefits were clear. With the membership subscription set at a relatively cheap price, a large number of the peasant and working classes could join. Affordability ensured large numbers. In effect, it became a universal Catholic organization that was transparent and populist. The fact that each member had contributed financially to the association also ensured that they were more deeply involved in pushing the cause of Catholic emancipation. People wanted value for their money. Thus, this ensured a cheap method for O'Connell to get the message of Catholic emancipation spread throughout Ireland.

The Catholic Association's funds were to be diffused widely in a variety of areas. Some was spent campaigning for Catholic emancipation, defraying the costs of sending petitions to Westminster, and training of Priests. Following the 1826 election campaign, funds were used to support the members of the organization who had voted against their landlords. The money was used for those who had been evicted from land by the landlords because of their connection to the Catholic organization or for those who were boycotting absentee landlord. For the Catholic peasants that were in this situation, the future would be grim as they would be unable to continue the boycott without food and money, and they would be unable to lease land from any landlord as the peasants would be boycotted against in return. The Catholic Association's funds were used to support these boycotts so that they could continue and live well enough to have enough food to survive.

== Strengths ==
The Catholic Association was originally aristocratic in its composition, and some of the gentry (such as Richard Lalor Sheil) held relatively conservative views. However, Daniel O'Connell held an enormous influence over society and largely dictated the policies it pursued. It was radical in nature but also extremely loyal to the crown in appearance. This had been the strategy of the previous major Catholic group, the Catholic Committee of the 1790s, which achieved major Catholic Relief in 1793.

Since the aims of the Catholic Association were fairly moderate and the organization remained loyal to the monarch, British MPs were conceptually more willing to pass Catholic emancipation. The matter had been discussed in London since the 1800 Act of Union, when the Prime Minister Pitt and most of his colleagues resigned from the cabinet when emancipation was denied by the king. Henry Grattan continued to support the cause, and Catholic emancipation had been passed by the House of Commons previously by a majority of six, but it was rejected in the House of Lords and generally by King George III, who reigned until 1820.

The biggest strength of the Catholic Association was that the Catholic Church helped in the collection of the Catholic rent. Catholic priests also held sermons in favor of Catholic emancipation. This meant that it was easy for the members to pay the Catholic rent, and it would attract more members as the message of Catholic emancipation was being spread throughout Ireland. Sir Robert Peel believed the alliance of the Catholic Association and the Catholic Church was a "powerful combination".

In 1826, the Catholic Association began to use its funds to support pro-emancipation MPs in elections. They used their money and manpower to campaign for the candidate to be elected into parliament to pressure the government from within to pass Catholic emancipation.

The turning point came in 1828, when two factors came into play. The first was that the Catholic Church took over the collection of the Catholic Rent and effectively the Catholic Association itself. The other was that by 1828, Daniel O'Connell's reputation had increased dramatically. O'Connell was an internationally recognized figure and was seen as one of the leading figures in liberal thinking. This successful campaign led on to, but must be distinguished from, his later efforts to end the union with Britain, to increase the franchise, and to end the payment of tithes. O'Connell's particular talent was to push the emancipation process along in an organized way.

== Campaign from 1828 ==
In May 1828, the Sacramental Test Act 1828 repealed the Test and Corporation Acts against non-Anglican Protestants. This gave non-Catholic non-conformists greater political freedom and equality in Britain. The repeal had two effects: it gave Catholics hope that a similar act would be passed that would include Catholics; it also alienated Catholics, as they had become the only Christians not to have political freedom and equality.

In May 1828, William Huskisson resigned from the cabinet, and William Vesey Fitzgerald was chosen as the President of the Board of Trade. According to the law, there was to be a by-election in his constituency of County Clare. Daniel O'Connell decided to exploit a loophole in the Act of Union. It required MPs to take the Oath of Allegiance, but the oath was not required of candidates for election. O'Connell stood in the by-election and won. Since he was a Catholic, he could not take his seat in parliament. Demand rose to allow him to become an MP for County Clare, as it did not have representation.

Sir Robert Peel and the Duke of Wellington saw that if O'Connell were not allowed to take his seat, then there could be a revolution in Ireland. While using non-violent methods, O'Connell hinted that he would get more Catholics elected to force the situation. In an emotive speech, he said "They must crush us or conciliate us".

Peel decided to change the government's approach and submitted the Roman Catholic Relief Bill in February 1829. The bill was passed. It was a momentous victory for O'Connell and the Catholic middle class, and he became known as "the liberator" and the "uncrowned king of Ireland". However, the simultaneous enactment of the Parliamentary Elections (Ireland) Act 1829 restricted the franchise in the county constituencies in Ireland. The archive of the Catholic Association is housed with the archives of Dublin Diocese in Clonliffe College.

== See also ==
- Catholic emancipation
- Repeal Association
- Catholic Committee (Ireland)
- History of Ireland (1801–1923)
- Bishop James Doyle
- Irish Nationalism
