= Simony Act 1688 =

Act of the Parliament of England

Simony Act 1688 (Note: The citation of this act by this short title was authorised by section 5 of, and the second schedule to, the Statute Law Revision Act 1948. Due to the repeal of those provisions, it is now authorised by section 19(2) of the Interpretation Act 1978.)
- Act of Parliament
- Parliament of England
- Long title: An Act that the Simoniacall Promotion of one Person may not prejudice another. (Note: These words are printed against this act in the second column of the second schedule to the Statute Law Revision Act 1948, which is headed "Title".)
- Citation: 1 Will. & Mar. c. 16 (Note: This is the citation in The Statutes of the Realm.); 1 Will. & Mar. Sess. 1. c. 16 (Note: This is the citation in The Statutes at Large.)
- Territorial extent: England and Wales

Dates
- Royal assent: 11 May 1689
- Commencement: 13 February 1689 (Note: Start of session.)
Other legislation
Amended by	Statute Law Revision Act 1888; Statute Law Revision Act 1948
Relates to	Simony Act 1588

Status: Amended

Text of statute as originally enacted

Revised text of statute as amended

Text of the Simony Act 1688 as in force today (including any amendments) within the United Kingdom, from legislation.gov.uk.

The Simony Act 1688 (1 Will. & Mar. c. 16) is an act of the Parliament of England that ensured that the simoniacal promotion of one person does not prejudice another and also protects certain leases made by simoniacal individuals.

As of 2025, the act remains largely in force in England and Wales.

== Subsequent developments ==
Section 2 of the act, from "bee it" to "aforesaid that" was repealed by section 1(1) of, and part I of the schedule to, the Statute Law Revision Act 1888 (51 & 52 Vict. c. 3), which came into force on 27 March 1888.
