= Jesuits etc. Act 1603 =

Act of the Parliament of England

- Act of Parliament
- Parliament of England
- Long title: An Act for the due execution of the Statutes against Jesuits, seminary Priests and recusants.
- Citation: 1 Jas. 1. c. 4
- Territorial extent: England and Wales; Isle of Man

Dates
- Royal assent: 4 July 1604
- Commencement: 19 March 1604 (Note: Start of session.)
- Repealed: England and Wales: 18 August 1846; Isle of Man: 25 July 1991
Other legislation
Amended by	Jesuits etc. Act 1603
Repealed by	England and Wales: Religious Disabilities Act 1846; Isle of Man: Statute Law Revision (Isle of Man) Act 1991

Status: Repealed

Text of statute as originally enacted

The Jesuits etc. Act 1603 (1 Jas. 1. c. 4) was an act of the Parliament of England during the reign of James I. It received royal assent on 4 July 1604 and confirmed the Elizabethan penal laws. It also enacted new penalties for Catholics who sent their children abroad to be educated in Catholic colleges. In order to placate the Catholic powers, James privately reassured the French envoy that he had no intention of enforcing the statute.

== Subsequent developments ==
The whole act, except "as relates to the keeping any school, or to the being a schoolmaster, or to the retaining or maintaining a schoolmaster", was repealed for England and Wales by section 1 of the Roman Catholics Act 1844 (7 & 8 Vict. c. 102)., which came into force on 9 August 1944.

The whole act was repealed for England and Wales by section 1 of the Religious Disabilities Act 1846 (9 & 10 Vict. c. 59), which came into force on 18 August 1846.

The whole act was repealed for the Isle of Man by section 1(2) of, and schedule 2 to, the Statute Law Revision (Isle of Man) Act 1991, which came into force on 25 July 1991.
