= List of acts of the Parliament of England from 1627 =

This is a list of acts of the Parliament of England for the year 1627.

For acts passed during the period 1707–1800, see the list of acts of the Parliament of Great Britain. See also the list of acts of the Parliament of Scotland, and the list of acts of the Parliament of Ireland.

For acts passed from 1801 onwards, see the list of acts of the Parliament of the United Kingdom. For acts of the devolved parliaments and assemblies in the United Kingdom, see the list of acts of the Scottish Parliament, the list of acts of the Northern Ireland Assembly, and the list of acts and measures of Senedd Cymru; see also the list of acts of the Parliament of Northern Ireland.

For medieval statutes, etc. that are not considered to be acts of Parliament, see the list of English statutes.

See also the List of ordinances and acts of the Parliament of England, 1642–1660 for ordinances and acts passed by the Long Parliament and other bodies without royal assent, and which were not considered to be valid legislation following the Restoration in 1660.

The number shown after each act's title is its chapter number. Acts are cited using this number, preceded by the years of the reign during which the relevant parliamentary session was held; thus the Union with Ireland Act 1800 is cited as "39 & 40 Geo. 3. c. 67", meaning the 67th act passed during the session that started in the 39th year of the reign of George III and which finished in the 40th year of that reign. The modern convention is to use Arabic numerals in citations (thus "41 Geo. 3" rather than "41 Geo. III"). Acts of the last session of the Parliament of Great Britain and the first session of the Parliament of the United Kingdom are both cited as "41 Geo. 3".

Acts passed by the Parliament of England did not have a short title; however, some of these acts have subsequently been given a short title by acts of the Parliament of the United Kingdom, such as the Short Titles Act 1896 (59 & 60 Vict. c. 14).

Acts passed by the Parliament of England were deemed to have come into effect on the first day of the session in which they were passed. Because of this, the years given in the list below may in fact be the year before a particular act was passed.

== 3 Cha. 1 ==
The first session of the 3rd Parliament of King Charles I which met from 17 March 1628 until 26 June 1628.

Note that this session was traditionally cited as 3 Car. 1, 3 Chas. 1 or 3 C. 1; it is listed in the "Chronological Table of the Statutes" as 3 Cha. 1

=== Public acts ===
Short title	Citation	Royal assent
Long title
Petition of Right or the Petition of Right Act 1627	3 Cha. 1. c. 1	7 June 1628
The Petition Exhibited to His Majestie by the Lordes Spirituall and Temporall and Commons in this present Parliament assembled concerning divers Rightes and Liberties of the Subjectes: with the Kinges Majesties Royall Aunswere thereunto in full Parliament.
Sunday Observance Act 1627 (repealed)	3 Cha. 1. c. 2	26 June 1628
An Act for the further reformation of sundry abuses committed on the Lord's day, commonly called Sunday. (Repealed by Statute Law Revision Act 1948 (11 & 12 Geo. 6. c. 62), Justices of the Peace Act 1949 (12, 13 & 14 Geo. 6. c. 101), Statute Law Revision Act 1958 (6 & 7 Eliz. 2. c. 46), Ecclesiastical Jurisdiction Measure 1963 (No. 1) and Statute Law (Repeals) Act 1969 (c. 52))
Popery Act 1627 (repealed)	3 Cha. 1. c. 3	26 June 1628
An Act to restrain the passing or sending of any to be popishly-bred beyond the seas. (Repealed by Roman Catholics Act 1844 (7 & 8 Vict. c. 102))
Alehouse Act 1627 (repealed)	3 Cha. 1. c. 4	26 June 1628
An Act for the better suppressing of unlicenced alehouse-keepers. (Repealed by Alehouse Act 1828 (9 Geo. 4. c. 61))
Continuance of Laws, etc. Act 1627 (repealed)	3 Cha. 1. c. 5	26 June 1628
An Act for the continuance and repeal of divers statutes. (Repealed for England and Wales by Statute Law Revision Act 1863 (26 & 27 Vict. c. 125) and for Northern Ireland by Statute Law Revision Act 1950 (14 Geo. 6. c. 6))
Lands at Bromfield and Yale, Denbighshire Act 1627 (repealed)	3 Cha. 1. c. 6	26 June 1628
An Act for confirming a late composition made with the tenants of Bromfield and Yale in the county of Denbigh. (Repealed by Statute Law (Repeals) Act 1978 (c. 45))
Taxation Act 1627 (repealed)	3 Cha. 1. c. 7	26 June 1628
An Act for five subsidies granted by the spiritualty. (Repealed by Statute Law Revision Act 1863 (26 & 27 Vict. c. 125))
Taxation (No. 2) Act 1627 (repealed)	3 Cha. 1. c. 8	26 June 1628
An Act for five subsidies granted by the temporalty. (Repealed by Statute Law Revision Act 1863 (26 & 27 Vict. c. 125))

=== Private acts ===
Short title	Citation	Royal assent
Long title
Sutton's Hospital in Charterhouse Act 1627	3 Cha. 1. c. 1 Pr.	26 June 1628
An act for the establishing and confirming of the foundation of the hospital of King James, founded in Charterhouse in the county of Middlesex, at the humble petition and only costs and charges of Thomas Sutton, esquire, and of the possessions thereof.
Sir Thomas Neville's Estate Act 1627	3 Cha. 1. c. 2 Pr.	26 June 1628
An Act for Assurance of a Jointure to Dame Frances Wife of Sir Thomas Nevill, Knight, Son and Heir apparent of Sir Henry Nevill, Knight, Lord Abergavenny; and to enable the same Lord and Sir Thomas to sell certain Lands for Payment of their Debts, and Preferment of their younger Children.
Earl of Devon's Estate Act 1627	3 Cha. 1. c. 3 Pr.	26 June 1628
An Act concerning the Inheritance, Freehold and Possessions of William Earl of Devon.
Earl of Arundel's Dignity and Estate Act 1627	3 Cha. 1. c. 4 Pr.	26 June 1628
An Act concerning the Title, Name and Dignity of Earl of Arundell, and for the annexing of the Castle, Honour, Manor and Lordship of Arundell in the County of Sussex, with the Titles and Dignities of the Baronies of Fitzallen Clun and Ojwaldestre and Matravers, and with divers other Lands, Tenements and Hereditaments hereafter in this Act mentioned, being now Parcel of the Possessions of Thomas Earl of Arundell and Surry Earl Marshall of England, to the same Title, Name and Dignity of Earl of Arundell.
Lord Gerrard's Estate Act 1627	3 Cha. 1. c. 5 Pr.	26 June 1628
An Act for the enabling of the Right Honourable Dutton Lord Gerard Baron of Gerards Bromley, to make a Jointure to any Wife which he shall hereafter marry, and to make Provision for any his younger Children, and for the better securing of Portions and Limitation of Maintenance of Alice Gerard, Frances Gerard and Elizabeth Gerard, Sisters of the said Dutton Lord Gerard, and Daughters of the late Right Honourable Gilbert Lord Gerard deceased.
Confirmation of Earl of Bristol's Letters Patent Act 1627	3 Cha. 1. c. 6 Pr.	26 June 1628
An Act for the Confirmation of Letters Patents made by our late Sovereign Lord King James to John Earl of Bristol, by the Name of John Digby, Knight.
William Morgan's Estate Act 1627	3 Cha. 1. c. 7 Pr.	26 June 1628
An Act tor Re-estating certain Manors, Lands and Tenements in the County of Somerset, late of Willlam Morgan of Penrose in the County of Monmouth, Esquire, and discharging the Trust concerning them.
Naturalization of Sir Robert Dyell and George Kerke Act 1627	3 Cha. 1. c. 8 Pr.	26 June 1628
An Act for the Naturalizing of Sir Robert Diell, Knight and one of the Gentlemen of His Majesty's Privy Chamber; George Kirke, Esquire, one of the Grooms of His Majesty's Bedchamber; and their legitimate Children.
Naturalization of Sir Daniel Deligne Act 1627	3 Cha. 1. c. 9 Pr.	26 June 1628
An Act for the Naturalizing of Sir Daniell Delingne of Harlaxton in the County of Lincoln, Knight.
Naturalization of Isaac, Henry, Thomas and Bernard Asteley Act 1627	3 Cha. 1. c. 10 Pr.	26 June 1628
An Act for the Naturalizing of Isaac Asteley, Henry Asteley, Thomas Asteley and Barnard Asteley, Sons of Sir Jacob Asteley, Knight, one of the younger Sons of Isaac Asteley, late of Melton Constable in the County of Norfolk, Esquire, deceased.
Naturalization of Sir Robert Ayton Act 1627	3 Cha. 1. c. 11 Pr.	26 June 1628
An Act for the Naturalizing of Sir Robert Ayton, Knight and all of his legitimate Children.
Naturalization of Samuel Powell Act 1627	3 Cha. 1. c. 12 Pr.	26 June 1628
An Act for the Naturalizing of Samuel Powell, born in Hamburg of English Parents.
Vincent Lowe's Estate Act 1627	3 Cha. 1. c. 13 Pr.	26 June 1628
An Act for the Amendment of a Word casually mistaken and miswritten in an Act of Parliament made in the Session of Parliament holden at Westminster the nineteenth Day of February in the one and twentieth Year of the Reign of our late Sovereign Lord King James of England, intituled, "An Act to enable Vincent Love of Denbigh, in the County of Derby, Esquire, to sell Part of his Lands for Payment of his Debts." (Note: Vincent Lowe's Estate Act 1623 (21 Jas. 1. c. 21 Pr.))
Naturalization of Alexander Levingston Act 1627	3 Cha. 1. c. 14 Pr.	26 June 1628
An Act for the Naturalizing of Alexander Levingstone, Equerry.
Naturalization of James Freese Act 1627	3 Cha. 1. c. 15 Pr.	26 June 1628
An Act for the Naturalizing of James Freese born in Russia.
Restitution in blood of Carew Raleigh, son of Sir Walter Raleigh, and confirmation of Earl of Bristol's letters patent.	3 Cha. 1. c. 16 Pr.	26 June 1628
An Act for Restitution in Blood of Carew Raleigh, Son of Sir Walter Raleigh late attainted of High Treason; and for Confirmation of certain Letters Patents made by our late Sovereign Lord King James to John Earl of Bristol, by the Name of John Digby, Knight.
Naturalization of John, Mary, Ann, Elizabeth and Margaret Aldersey Act 1627	3 Cha. 1. c. 17 Pr.	26 June 1628
An Act for the Naturalizing of John Aldersey, Marie Aldersey (now the Wife of Robert Crane) Anne Aldersey, Elizabeth Aldersey and Margarett Aldersey, Children of Samuell Aldersey of the City of London, Esquire.
Confirmation of estates of customary tenants of Henry, Baron of Rye, in the manor of Horneby and elsewhere in the townships of Tatham, Gressingham and Eskrigg (Lancashire).	3 Cha. 1. c. 18 Pr.	26 June 1628
An Act for the perfect Settling and Confirmation of the Estates and Customs of the Customary Tenants of the Right Honourable Henry now Lord Morley and Lord Mountegle, Baron of Rye, within the Manor of Horneby and elsewhere within the Townships of Tatham, Gressingham and Eskrigg in the County Palatine of Lancaster.
Naturalization of John and Anne Trumball, William, Edward and Sidney Bere and Samuel Wentworth Act 1627	3 Cha. 1. c. 19 Pr.	26 June 1628
An Act for the Naturalizing of John Trumball and Anne Trumball, Children of William Trumball, Esquire; William Bere, Edward Bere and Sidney Bere, Sons of John Bere, Esquire; and Samuell Wentworth, Son of William Wentworth of Dover, Merchant.

=== Sources ===
- Raithby, John, ed. (1963) [1819]. "3° Car. I.". Statutes of the Realm. Vol. 5: The Statutes of King Charles I and King Charles II (1625–1680). London: Dawsons. pp. 23–53 – via HathiTrust.
- Raithby, John, ed. (1819). Statutes of the Realm. Vol. 5: 1628-80 – via British History Online.
- Pickering, Danby, ed. (1763). "Anno tertio Caroli". The Statutes at Large. Vol. 7: From the Thirty-ninth Year of Q. Elizabeth to the Twelfth Year of K. Charles. Inclusive. Cambridge: Joseph Bentham. pp. 317–332 – via Internet Archive.
- Journal of the House of Commons. Vol. 1 – 1547-1629. His Majesty's Stationery Office. 1802 – via British History Online.
- Journal of the House of Lords. Vol. 3: 1620-1628. London: His Majesty's Stationery Office. 1830 – via British History Online.
- Journal of the House of Lords. Vol. 4: 1629-1642. London: His Majesty's Stationery Office. 1830 – via British History Online.
- Chronological Table of and Index to the Statutes. Vol. 1: To the End of the Session 59 Vict. Sess. 2 (1895) (13th ed.). London: Her Majesty's Stationery Office. 1896. p. 67 – via Google Books.
- Chronological Table of the Statutes: Covering the Period from 1235 to the End of 1971. London: Her Majesty's Stationery Office. 1972. p. 65. ISBN 978-0-11-840096-1 – via Google Books.
- "Acts of the English Parliament from 1627". legislation.gov.uk. The National Archives.
- "Chronological Tables of the Private and Personal Acts: Part 2 (1603–1640)". legislation.gov.uk. The National Archives.

== See also ==
- List of acts of the Parliament of England
