= Popish Recusants Act 1592 =

Act of the Parliament of England

- Act of Parliament
- Parliament of England
- Long title: An Act for Restraining Popish Recusants to some certain Places of Abode.
- Citation: 35 Eliz. 1. c. 2
- Territorial extent: England and Wales

Dates
- Royal assent: 10 April 1593
- Commencement: 18 February 1593 (Note: Start of session.)
- Repealed: 9 August 1844
Other legislation
Repealed by	Roman Catholics Act 1844
Relates to	Religion Act 1592

Status: Repealed

Text of statute as originally enacted

The Popish Recusants Act 1592 (35 Eliz. 1. c. 2) was an act of the Parliament of England. It was one of many acts imposed by the 8th Parliament of Elizabeth I to restrict and punish recusants for not joining the Church of England.

== Provisions ==
Introduction:

"For the better discovering and avoiding of all such traitorous and most dangerous conspiracies and attempts as are daily devised and practised against our most gracious sovereign lady the queen's majesty and the happy estate of this commonweal, by sundry wicked and seditious persons, who, terming themselves Catholics, and being indeed spies and intelligencers, not only for her majesty's foreign enemies, but also for rebellious and traitorous subjects born within her highness's realms and dominions, and hiding their most detestable and devilish purposes under a false pretext of religion and conscience, do secretly wander and shift from place to place within this realm, to corrupt and seduce her majesty's subjects, and to stir them to sedition and rebellion"

The act forbade Roman Catholic recusants from moving more than five miles from their house or otherwise they would forfeit all their property. It also stated that every person above age 16 will be lawfully convicted for "not repairing to some church, chapel, or usual place of common prayer"

== Subsequent developments ==
The whole act was repealed by section 1 of the Roman Catholics Act 1844 (7 & 8 Vict. c. 102), which came into force on 9 August 1844.
