= Papists Act 1688 =

Act of the Parliament of England

- Act of Parliament
- Parliament of England
- Long title: An Act for the Amoving Papists and reputed Papists from the Cityes of London and Westminster and Ten Miles distance from the same.
- Citation: 1 Will. & Mar. c. 9 (Note: This is the citation in The Statutes of the Realm.); 1 Will. & Mar. Sess. 1. c. 9 (Note: This is the citation in The Statutes at Large.)
- Territorial extent: England and Wales

Dates
- Royal assent: 24 April 1689
- Commencement: 13 February 1689 (Note: Start of session.)
- Repealed: 9 August 1844
Other legislation
Amended by	Papists (Amendment) Act 1688
Repealed by	Roman Catholics Act 1844

Status: Repealed

Text of statute as originally enacted

Papists (Amendment) Act 1688
- Act of Parliament
- Parliament of England
- Long title: An Act for rectifying a Mistake in a certaine Act of this present Parliament For the amoveing Papists from the Cities of London and Westminster.
- Citation: 1 Will. & Mar. c. 17; 1 Will. & Mar. Sess. 1. c. 17
- Territorial extent: England and Wales

Dates
- Royal assent: 11 May 1689
- Commencement: 13 February 1689
- Repealed: 9 August 1844
Other legislation
Amends	Papists Act 1688
Repealed by	Roman Catholics Act 1844

Status: Repealed

Text of statute as originally enacted

The Papists Act 1688 (1 Will. & Mar. c. 9) was an act of the Parliament of England passed during the Glorious Revolution. Its full title was "An Act for the Amoving Papists and reputed Papists from the Cityes of London and Westminster and Ten Miles distance from the same".

== Subsequent developments ==
The whole act was repealed by section 1 of the Roman Catholics Act 1844 (7 & 8 Vict. c. 102), which came into force on 9 August 1844.
