= List of acts of the Parliament of England from 1688 =

This is a list of acts of the Parliament of England for the year 1688.

For acts passed during the period 1707–1800, see the list of acts of the Parliament of Great Britain. See also the list of acts of the Parliament of Scotland, and the list of acts of the Parliament of Ireland.

For acts passed from 1801 onwards, see the list of acts of the Parliament of the United Kingdom. For acts of the devolved parliaments and assemblies in the United Kingdom, see the list of acts of the Scottish Parliament, the list of acts of the Northern Ireland Assembly, and the list of acts and measures of Senedd Cymru; see also the list of acts of the Parliament of Northern Ireland.

For medieval statutes, etc. that are not considered to be acts of Parliament, see the list of English statutes.

See also the List of ordinances and acts of the Parliament of England, 1642–1660 for ordinances and acts passed by the Long Parliament and other bodies without royal assent, and which were not considered to be valid legislation following the Restoration in 1660.

The number shown after each act's title is its chapter number. Acts are cited using this number, preceded by the years of the reign during which the relevant parliamentary session was held; thus the Union with Ireland Act 1800 is cited as "39 & 40 Geo. 3. c. 67", meaning the 67th act passed during the session that started in the 39th year of the reign of George III and which finished in the 40th year of that reign. The modern convention is to use Arabic numerals in citations (thus "41 Geo. 3" rather than "41 Geo. III"). Acts of the last session of the Parliament of Great Britain and the first session of the Parliament of the United Kingdom are both cited as "41 Geo. 3".

Acts passed by the Parliament of England did not have a short title; however, some of these acts have subsequently been given a short title by acts of the Parliament of the United Kingdom, such as the Short Titles Act 1896 (59 & 60 Vict. c. 14).

Acts passed by the Parliament of England were deemed to have come into effect on the first day of the session in which they were passed. Because of this, the years given in the list below may in fact be the year before a particular act was passed.

== 1 Will. & Mar. ==
The first session of the Convention Parliament, which met from 13 February 1689 until 21 October 1689.

Cited in Ruffhead's Statutes at Large as 1 Will. & Mar. Sess. 1. This session was also traditionally cited as 1 Will. & Mary, 1 Gul. & Mar., 1 Gul. et Mar. or 1 W. & M.

=== Public acts ===
Short title	Citation	Royal assent
Long title
Parliament Act 1688	1 Will. & Mar. c. 1 (Note: This is the citation in The Statutes of the Realm.); 1 Will. & Mar. Sess. 1. c. 1 (Note: This is the citation in The Statutes at Large.)	23 February 1689
An Act for removeing and Preventing all Questions and Disputes concerning the Assembling and Sitting of this present Parlyament.
Habeas Corpus Suspension Act 1688 (repealed)	1 Will. & Mar. c. 2; 1 Will. & Mar. Sess. 1. c. 2	16 March 1689
An Act for Impowering His Majestie to Apprehend and Detaine such Persons as He shall finde just Cause to Suspect are Conspireing against the Government. (Repealed by Statute Law Revision Act 1867 (30 & 31 Vict. c. 59))
Taxation Act 1688 (repealed)	1 Will. & Mar. c. 3; 1 Will. & Mar. Sess. 1. c. 3	21 March 1689
An Act for the granting a present Ayd to Their Majestyes. (Repealed by Statute Law Revision Act 1867 (30 & 31 Vict. c. 59))
Legal Proceedings Act 1688 (repealed)	1 Will. & Mar. c. 4; 1 Will. & Mar. Sess. 1. c. 4	3 April 1689
An Act for Reviveing of Actions and Processe lately Depending in the Courts at Westminster and Discontinued by the not holding of Hillary Terme and for supplying other Defects relateing to Proceedings at Law. (Repealed by Statute Law Revision Act 1867 (30 & 31 Vict. c. 59))
Mutiny Act 1688 (repealed)	1 Will. & Mar. c. 5; 1 Will. & Mar. Sess. 1. c. 5	3 April 1689
An Act for punishing Officers or Soldiers who shall Mutiny or Desert Their Majestyes Service. (Repealed by Statute Law Revision Act 1867 (30 & 31 Vict. c. 59))
Coronation Oath Act 1688	1 Will. & Mar. c. 6; 1 Will. & Mar. Sess. 1. c. 6	9 April 1689
An Act for Establishing the Coronation Oath.
Habeas Corpus Suspension (No. 2) Act 1688 (repealed)	1 Will. & Mar. c. 7; 1 Will. & Mar. Sess. 1. c. 7	24 April 1689
An Act for Impowering His Majestie to Apprehend and Detaine such Persons as He shall finde Just Cause to Suspect are Conspireing against the Government. (Repealed by Statute Law Revision Act 1867 (30 & 31 Vict. c. 59))
Oaths of Allegiance and Supremacy Act 1688 (repealed)	1 Will. & Mar. c. 8; 1 Will. & Mar. Sess. 1. c. 8	24 April 1689
An Act for the Abrogating of the Oathes of Supremacy and Allegiance and Appointing other Oathes. (Repealed by Promissory Oaths Act 1871 (34 & 35 Vict. c. 48))
Papists Act 1688 (repealed)	1 Will. & Mar. c. 9; 1 Will. & Mar. Sess. 1. c. 9	24 April 1689
An Act for the Amoving Papists and reputed Papists from the Cityes of London and Westminster and Ten Miles distance from the same. (Repealed by Roman Catholics Act 1844 (7 & 8 Vict. c. 102))
Hearth Money Act 1688 (repealed)	1 Will. & Mar. c. 10; 1 Will. & Mar. Sess. 1. c. 10	24 April 1689
An Act for the takeing away the Revenue ariseing by Hearth-Money. (Repealed by Statute Law Revision Act 1867 (30 & 31 Vict. c. 59))
Great Yarmouth Haven and Pier Repairs Act 1688 (repealed)	1 Will. & Mar. c. 11; 1 Will. & Mar. Sess. 1. c. 11	24 April 1689
An Act for the Explaining and makeing Effectuall a Statute made in the First Yeare of King James the Second (Note: Great Yarmouth Haven and Pier Repairs (Duties) Act 1685 (1 Ja. 2. c. 16)) concerning the Haven and Pieres of Great Yarmouth. (Repealed by Statute Law Revision Act 1948 (11 & 12 Geo. 6. c. 62))
Exportation (Corn) Act 1688 (repealed)	1 Will. & Mar. c. 12; 1 Will. & Mar. Sess. 1. c. 12	24 April 1689
An Act for the Encouraging the Exportation of Corne. (Repealed by Importation and Exportation (No. 2) Act 1791 (31 Geo. 3. c. 30))
Poll Tax Act 1688 (repealed)	1 Will. & Mar. c. 13; 1 Will. & Mar. Sess. 1. c. 13	1 May 1689
An Act for raising Money by a Poll and otherwise towards the Reducing of Ireland. (Repealed by Statute Law Revision Act 1867 (30 & 31 Vict. c. 59))
Revenue Act 1688 (repealed)	1 Will. & Mar. c. 14; 1 Will. & Mar. Sess. 1. c. 14	1 May 1689
An Act for preventing Doubts and Questions concerning the Collecting the Publique Revenue. (Repealed by Statute Law Revision Act 1867 (30 & 31 Vict. c. 59))
Papists (No. 2) Act 1688 (repealed)	1 Will. & Mar. c. 15; 1 Will. & Mar. Sess. 1. c. 15	11 May 1689
An Act for the better secureing the Government by disarming Papists and reputed Papists. (Repealed by Roman Catholics Act 1844 (7 & 8 Vict. c. 102))
Simony Act 1688	1 Will. & Mar. c. 16; 1 Will. & Mar. Sess. 1. c. 16	11 May 1689
An Act that the Simoniacall Promotion of one Person may not prejudice another.
Papists (Amendment) Act 1688 (repealed)	1 Will. & Mar. c. 17; 1 Will. & Mar. Sess. 1. c. 17	11 May 1689
An Act for rectifying a Mistake in a certaine Act of this present Parliament For the amoveing Papists from the Cities of London and Westminster. (Note: Papists Act 1688 (1 Will. & Mar. c. 9)) (Repealed by Roman Catholics Act 1844 (7 & 8 Vict. c. 102))
Toleration Act 1688 or the Toleration Act 1689 or the Act of Toleration (repealed)	1 Will. & Mar. c. 18; 1 Will. & Mar. Sess. 1. c. 18	24 May 1689
An Act for Exempting their Majestyes Protestant Subjects dissenting from the Church of England from the Penalties of certaine Lawes. (Repealed by Promissory Oaths Act 1871 (34 & 35 Vict. c. 48), Statute Law Revision Act 1888 (51 & 52 Vict. c. 3), Statute Law Revision Act 1948 (11 & 12 Geo. 6. c. 62) and Statute Law (Repeals) Act 1969 (c. 52))
Habeas Corpus Suspension (No. 3) Act 1688 (repealed)	1 Will. & Mar. c. 19; 1 Will. & Mar. Sess. 1. c. 19	28 May 1689
An Act for Impowering Their Majestyes to Committ without Baile such Persons as They shall finde Just Cause to suspect are Conspireing against the Government. (Repealed by Statute Law Revision Act 1867 (30 & 31 Vict. c. 59))
Land Tax Act 1688 (repealed)	1 Will. & Mar. c. 20; 1 Will. & Mar. Sess. 1. c. 20	22 June 1689
An Act for a Grant to Their Majestyes of an Ayde of Twelve pence in the Pound for One Yeare for the necessary Defence of Their Realmes. (Repealed by Statute Law Revision Act 1867 (30 & 31 Vict. c. 59))
Great Seal Act 1688	1 Will. & Mar. c. 21; 1 Will. & Mar. Sess. 1. c. 21	22 June 1689
An Act for enabling Lords Commissioners for the Great Seale to execute the Office of Lord Chancellor or Lord Keeper.
Exportation (Beer and Cider) Act 1688 (repealed)	1 Will. & Mar. c. 22; 1 Will. & Mar. Sess. 1. c. 22	22 June 1689
An Act for the Exportation of Beere, Ale, Syder and Mum. (Repealed by Statute Law Revision Act 1867 (30 & 31 Vict. c. 59))
Exportation (Leather) Act 1688 (repealed)	1 Will. & Mar. c. 23; 1 Will. & Mar. Sess. 1. c. 23	22 June 1689
An Act for Reviveing two former Acts (Note: Exportation Act 1667 (19 & 20 Cha. 2. c. 10))) (Note: Trade Act 1685 (1 Ja. 2. c. 13)) for Exporting of Leather. (Repealed by Statute Law Revision Act 1867 (30 & 31 Vict. c. 59))
Excise Act 1688 (repealed)	1 Will. & Mar. c. 24; 1 Will. & Mar. Sess. 1. c. 24	25 July 1689
An Act for an Additionall Duty of Excise upon Beere Ale and other Liquors. (Repealed by Statute Law Revision Act 1867 (30 & 31 Vict. c. 59))
Oaths Act 1688 (repealed)	1 Will. & Mar. c. 25; 1 Will. & Mar. Sess. 1. c. 25	25 July 1689
An Act to Regulate the Administracion of the Oathes required to be taken by Commission or Warrant Officers imployed in their Majestyes Service by Land by Vertue of an Act made this present Session of Parliament Entituled An Act for the Abrogating of the Oaths of Supremacy and Allegiance and appointing other Oaths. (Note: Oaths of Allegiance and Supremacy Act 1688 (1 Will. & Mar. c. 8)) (Repealed by Statute Law Revision Act 1867 (30 & 31 Vict. c. 59))
Presentation of Benefices Act 1688 (repealed)	1 Will. & Mar. c. 26; 1 Will. & Mar. Sess. 1. c. 26	25 July 1689
An Act to vest in the two Universities the Presentations of Benefices belonging to Papists. (Repealed by Patronage (Benefices) Measure 1986 (No. 3))
Court of Marches of Wales Act 1688 (repealed)	1 Will. & Mar. c. 27; 1 Will. & Mar. Sess. 1. c. 27	25 July 1689
An Act for takeing away the Court holden before the President and Councill of the Marches of Wales. (Repealed by Statute Law Revision Act 1867 (30 & 31 Vict. c. 59))
Appropriation of Revenue Act 1688 (repealed)	1 Will. & Mar. c. 28; 1 Will. & Mar. Sess. 1. c. 28	20 August 1689
An Act for Appropriating certaine Duties for paying the States Generall of the United Provinces their Charges, His Majesties Expedition into this Kingdome and for other Uses. (Repealed by Statute Law Revision Act 1867 (30 & 31 Vict. c. 59))
Clergy (Ireland) Act 1688 (repealed)	1 Will. & Mar. c. 29; 1 Will. & Mar. Sess. 1. c. 29	20 August 1689
An Act for Reliefe of the Protestant Irish Clergy. (Repealed by Statute Law Revision Act 1867 (30 & 31 Vict. c. 59))
Royal Mines Act 1688 or the Mines Royal Act 1688	1 Will. & Mar. c. 30; 1 Will. & Mar. Sess. 1. c. 30	20 August 1689
An Act to Repeale the Statute made in the fifth yeare of King Henry the Fourth (Note: Gold and Silver Act 1403 (5 Hen. 4. c. 4)) against the Multiplying Gold and Silver.
Land Tax (Commissioners) Act 1688 (repealed)	1 Will. & Mar. c. 31; 1 Will. & Mar. Sess. 1. c. 31	20 August 1689
An Additionall Act for the Appointing Commissioners for the Executing an Act of this present Parliament, Entituled, "An Act for a Grant to their Majestyes of an Ayde of Twelve Pence in the Pound for One Yeare for the necessary Defence of their Realmes." (Note: Land Tax Act 1688 (1 Will. & Mar. c. 20)) (Repealed by Statute Law Revision Act 1867 (30 & 31 Vict. c. 59))
Woollen Manufactures Act 1688 (repealed)	1 Will. & Mar. c. 32; 1 Will. & Mar. Sess. 1. c. 32	20 August 1689
An Act for the better preventing the Exportation of Woole and Encourageing the Woollen Manufactures of this Kingdome. (Repealed by Statute Law Revision Act 1867 (30 & 31 Vict. c. 59))
Leather Act 1688 (repealed)	1 Will. & Mar. c. 33; 1 Will. & Mar. Sess. 1. c. 33	20 August 1689
An Act for Explaining part of an Act made in the first yeare of King James the First (Note: Leather Act 1603 (1 Jas. 1. c. 22)) concerning Tanned Leather. (Repealed by Statute Law Revision Act 1867 (30 & 31 Vict. c. 59))
Trade with France Act 1688 (repealed)	1 Will. & Mar. c. 34; 1 Will. & Mar. Sess. 1. c. 34	20 August 1689
An Act for Prohibiting all Trade and Commerce with France. (Repealed by Statute Law Revision Act 1867 (30 & 31 Vict. c. 59))

=== Private acts ===
Short title	Citation	Royal assent
Long title
Annulling William Lord Russell's Attainder Act 1688	1 Will. & Mar. c. 1 Pr.	16 March 1689
An Act for annulling and making void the Attainder of William Russell Esquire, commonly called Lord Russell.
Prince George of Denmark (Exhibition of Bill) Act 1688	1 Will. & Mar. c. 2 Pr.	3 April 1689
An Act for exhibiting a Bill in this present Parliament, for naturalizing the most Noble Prince George of Denmarke.
Prince George of Denmark (Naturalization and Precedence) Act 1688	1 Will. & Mar. c. 3 Pr.	9 April 1689
An Act for the Naturalization of the most Noble Prince George of Denmark, and settling his Precedence.
Naturalization of Frederick Count Schomberg and others.	1 Will. & Mar. c. 4 Pr.	9 April 1689
An Act for the naturalizing of Frederick Count Schomberg (Note: Frederick Schomberg, 1st Duke of Schomberg) and others.
Enabling Younger Cooke to sell lands for payment of debts and provision for younger children.	1 Will. & Mar. c. 5 Pr.	1 May 1689
An Act to enable Younger Cooke Esquire to sell Lands, to pay his Debts, and provide for his Younger Children.
Naturalization of Henry de Nassau and others.	1 Will. & Mar. c. 6 Pr.	11 May 1689
An Act for the Naturalization of Henry de Nassau (Note: Henry de Nassau, Lord Overkirk) and others.
Annulling Algernoon Sydney's Attainder Act 1688	1 Will. & Mar. c. 7 Pr.	11 May 1689
An Act for the annulling and making void the Attainder of Algernoone Sydney Esquire. (Note: Algernon Sidney)
Annulling Alicia Lisle's Attainder Act 1688	1 Will. & Mar. c. 8 Pr.	24 May 1689
An Act for annulling and making void the Attainder of Alicia Lisle Widow.
Henry Coventry's Estate Act 1688	1 Will. & Mar. c. 9 Pr.	24 May 1689
An Act for the Sale or Leasing the Capital Messuage (late Henry Coventry's Esquire) (Note: Henry Coventry) in Piccadilly.
For building into tenements the remaining inclosed part of Arundel Ground.	1 Will. & Mar. c. 10 Pr.	28 May 1689
An Act for building into Tenements the remaining Part of Arundell Ground, (Note: Site of Arundel House, St Clement Danes, London.) as now enclosed.
Naturalization of Anne Astley and others.	1 Will. & Mar. c. 11 Pr.	22 June 1689
An Act for the Naturalization of Anne Astley and others.
Better assurance of manor of Silton and other lands to Joseph Soley in Silton (Salop.).	1 Will. & Mar. c. 12 Pr.	22 June 1689
An Act for the better assuring the Manor of Silton, and divers other Lands and Tenements in Silton, in the County of Salop, unto Joseph Soley Gentleman, and his Heirs.
Enabling Robert Penwarne to sell lands to pay his siblings' portions and to pay debts.	1 Will. & Mar. c. 13 Pr.	22 June 1689
An Act to enable Robert Penwarne to sell Lands, to pay his Brothers and Sisters Portions; and also to pay Debts.
Making good a recovery suffered by the Earl of Peterborough and Lord Mordaunt.	1 Will. & Mar. c. 14 Pr.	22 June 1689
An Act to make good a Recovery suffered by the Earl of Peterborough and Lord Mordaunt.
Enabling Theodore Bathurst to make a jointure for his wife and to charge monies on part of his estate in Yorkshire.	1 Will. & Mar. c. 15 Pr.	22 June 1689
An Act to enable Theodore Bathurst to make a Jointure for his Wife, and to charge Monies on Part of his Estate in Yorkeshire.
Reversing Henry Cornish's Attainder Act 1688	1 Will. & Mar. c. 16 Pr.	22 June 1689
An Act for reversing the Attainder of Henry Cornish Esquire, (Note: Henry Cornish, d. 1685.) late Alderman of the City of London.
Newcastle upon Tyne Court of Conscience Act 1688 (repealed)	1 Will. & Mar. c. 17 Pr.	25 July 1689
An Act for erecting a Court of Conscience at New Castle upon Tyne. (Repealed by Statute Law (Repeals) Act 2013 (c. 2))
Bristol and Gloucester Courts of Conscience Act 1688 (repealed)	1 Will. & Mar. c. 18 Pr.	25 July 1689
An Act for erecting Courts of Conscience in the Cities of Bristoll and Gloucester, and the Liberties thereof. (Repealed by Statute Law (Repeals) Act 2013 (c. 2))
Droitwich Salt Works Act 1688	1 Will. & Mar. c. 19 Pr.	25 July 1689
An Act for the better regulating the Saltworks in Droitwich.
Enabling Thomas Chettell to sell part of his estate for payment of debts and making provision for wife and children.	1 Will. & Mar. c. 20 Pr.	25 July 1689
An Act to enable Thomas Chettell Esquire to sell Part of his Estate, for Payment of his Debts, and making Provision for his Wife and Children.
Richard Hele's Estate Act 1688	1 Will. & Mar. c. 21 Pr.	20 August 1689
An Act to enable Trustees to grant Leases of the Estate of Richard Hele Esquire.
Enabling Hannah Sherley and her daughter Mary Battilhey to sell and dispose of lands in Middlesex and Essex.	1 Will. & Mar. c. 22 Pr.	20 August 1689
An Act for enabling of Hannah Sherley Widow and Mary Battilhey, alias Sherley, her Daughter, to settle and dispose of certain Lands and Tenements in the County of Midd. and Essex.

=== Sources ===
- Raithby, John, ed. (1963) [1819]. "1° Gul. & Mar.". Statutes of the Realm. Vol. 6: The Statutes of King James II, and King William and Queen Mary (1685–1694). London: Dawsons. pp. 23–103 – via HathiTrust.
- Raithby, John, ed. (1819). Statutes of the Realm. Vol. 6: 1685-94 – via British History Online.
- Pickering, Danby, ed. (1764). "Sessio Prima. Anno primo Gulielmi & Mariæ". The Statutes at Large. Vol. 9: From the First Year of K. William and Q. Mary to Eighth Year of K. William III – 1688 to 1695–96. Cambridge: Joseph Bentham. pp. 1–67 – via Internet Archive.
- Pickering, Danby, ed. (1764). "Sessio Prima. Anno primo Gulielmi & Mariæ". The Statutes at Large. Vol. 9: From the First Year of K. William and Q. Mary to Eighth Year of K. William III – 1688 to 1695–96. Cambridge: Joseph Bentham. pp. 1–67 – via Internet Archive.
- Journals of the House of Commons. Vol. 10. London: His Majesty's Stationery Office. 1803. pp. 29–272 – via Google Books.
- Chronological Table of and Index to the Statutes. Vol. 1: To the End of the Session 59 Vict. Sess. 2 (1895) (13th ed.). London: Her Majesty's Stationery Office. 1896. pp. 74–75 – via Google Books.
- Chronological Table of the Statutes: Covering the Period from 1235 to the End of 1971. London: Her Majesty's Stationery Office. 1972. pp. 72–73. ISBN 978-0-11-840096-1 – via Google Books.
- "Acts of the English Parliament from 1688". legislation.gov.uk. The National Archives.
- "Chronological Tables of the Private and Personal Acts: Part 4 (1685–1694)". legislation.gov.uk. The National Archives.

== 1 Will. & Mar. Sess. 2 ==
The second session of the Convention Parliament, which met from 23 October 1689 until 27 January 1690.

This session was also traditionally cited as 1 Will. & Mar. sess. 2, 1 Will. & Mar. Stat. 2, 1 Will. & Mar. stat. 2, 1 Will. & Mar. St. 2, 1 Will. & Mar. st. 2, 1 Will. & Mary, Sess. 2, 1 Will. & Mary, sess. 2, 1 Will. & Mary, Stat. 2, 1 Will. & Mary, stat. 2, 1 Will. & Mary, St. 2, 1 Will. & Mary, st. 2, 1 Gul. & Mar. Sess. 2, 1 Gul. & Mar. sess. 2, 1 Gul. & Mar. Stat. 2, 1 Gul. & Mar. stat. 2, 1 Gul. & Mar. St. 2, 1 Gul. & Mar. st. 2, 1 Gul. et Mar. Sess. 2, 1 Gul. et Mar. sess. 2, 1 Gul. et Mar. Stat. 2, 1 Gul. et Mar. stat. 2, 1 Gul. et Mar. St. 2, 1 Gul. et Mar. st. 2, 1 W. & M. Sess. 2, 1 W. & M. sess. 2, 1 W. & M. Stat. 2, 1 W. & M. stat. 2, 1 W. & M. St. 2 or 1 W. & M. st. 2.

=== Public acts ===
Short title	Citation	Royal assent
Long title
Taxation (No. 3) Act 1688 (repealed)	1 Will. & Mar. Sess. 2. c. 1	16 December 1689
An Act for a Grant to Their Majestyes of an Ayd of Two shillings in the Pound for One Yeare. (Repealed by Statute Law Revision Act 1867 (30 & 31 Vict. c. 59))
Bill of Rights or the Bill of Rights 1688 or the Bill of Rights 1689	1 Will. & Mar. Sess. 2. c. 2	16 December 1689
An Act Declaring the Rights and Liberties of the Subject and Settling the Succession of the Crown.
Revenue Act 1688 (repealed)	1 Will. & Mar. Sess. 2. c. 3	23 December 1689
An Act for preventing all Doubts and Questions concerning the Collecting the Publique Revenue. (Repealed by Statute Law Revision Act 1867 (30 & 31 Vict. c. 59))
Mutiny (No. 2) Act 1688 (repealed)	1 Will. & Mar. Sess. 2. c. 4	23 December 1689
An Act for punishing Officers or Soldiers who shall Mutiny or Desert Their Majestyes Service and for punishing False Musters. (Repealed by Statute Law Revision Act 1867 (30 & 31 Vict. c. 59))
Taxation (No. 4) Act 1688 (repealed)	1 Will. & Mar. Sess. 2. c. 5	16 January 1690
An Act for a Grant to Their Majestyes of an Additionall Ayd of Twelve Pence in the Pound for One Yeare. (Repealed by Statute Law Revision Act 1867 (30 & 31 Vict. c. 59))
Taxation (No. 5) Act 1688 (repealed)	1 Will. & Mar. Sess. 2. c. 6	27 January 1690
An Act for the Charging and Collecting the Duties upon Coffee Tea and Chocolate at the Custome-House. (Repealed by Statute Law Revision Act 1867 (30 & 31 Vict. c. 59))
Taxation (No. 6) Act 1688 (repealed)	1 Will. & Mar. Sess. 2. c. 7	27 January 1690
An Act for Review of the late Poll Granted to Their Majestyes and for an Additionall Poll towards the Reducing of Ireland. (Repealed by Statute Law Revision Act 1867 (30 & 31 Vict. c. 59))
Indemnity Act 1688 (repealed)	1 Will. & Mar. Sess. 2. c. 8	27 January 1690
An Act for preventing vexatious Suits against such as acted in order to the bringing in their Majestyes or for their Service. (Repealed by Statute Law Revision Act 1867 (30 & 31 Vict. c. 59))
Relief of Irish Protestants Act 1688 (repealed)	1 Will. & Mar. Sess. 2. c. 9	27 January 1690
An Act for the better Security and Reliefe of their Majesties Protestant Subjects of Ireland. (Repealed by Statute Law Revision Act 1948 (11 & 12 Geo. 6. c. 62))

=== Private acts ===
Short title	Citation	Royal assent
Long title
Watts' Naturalization Act 1688	1 Will. & Mar. Sess. 2. c. 1 Pr.	16 December 1689
An Act for the Naturalization of William Watts.
Rogerson's Naturalization Act 1688	1 Will. & Mar. Sess. 2. c. 2 Pr.	16 December 1689
An Act, declaring and enacting John Rogerson to be a natural-born Subject of this Kingdom.
Viscount Hereford's Estate Act 1688	1 Will. & Mar. Sess. 2. c. 3 Pr.	23 December 1689
An Act for the enabling Edward Viscount Hereford to settle a Jointure on his Marriage with Elizabeth Norborne, notwithstanding his Minority.
Wortley Estate (Children's Maintenance) Act 1688	1 Will. & Mar. Sess. 2. c. 4 Pr.	16 January 1690
An Act for providing Maintenances for the Children of Sydney Wortley, alias Montagu, Esquire, during his Wife's Life, in case she survive him.
Discharge of Duke of Norfolk and trustees of Henry late Duke of Norfolk upon payment of certain sums of money to Lady Elizabeth Teresa Russell.	1 Will. & Mar. Sess. 2. c. 5 Pr.	27 January 1690
An Act to discharge the Duke of Norfolke, and the Trustees of Henry late Duke of Norfolke, upon Payment of certain Sums of Money to the Lady Elizabeth Teresa Russell, Wise of Bartholomew Russell, Esquire.
Earl of Radnor's Estate Act 1688	1 Will. & Mar. Sess. 2. c. 6 Pr.	27 January 1690
An Act to enable Charles Bodvile Earl of Radnor to make a Jointure, and to raise a Sum of Money, out of divers Lands and Tenements in the County of Cornwall.
Edon's Estate Act 1688	1 Will. & Mar. Sess. 2. c. 7 Pr.	27 January 1690
An Act to enable Thomas Edon Esquire to sell Lands, for Payment of his Debts, and making Provision for his Wife, and Children in case they shall have any.
Batson's Estate Act 1688	1 Will. & Mar. Sess. 2. c. 8 Pr.	27 January 1690
An Act to enable William Bateson Esquire to sell Lands in the County of Oxford, and to purchase and settle other Lands in the County of Suffolke.

=== Sources ===
- Raithby, John, ed. (1963) [1819]. "1° Gul. & Mar. Sess. 2". Statutes of the Realm. Vol. 6: The Statutes of King James II, and King William and Queen Mary (1685–1694). London: Dawsons. pp. 104–155 – via HathiTrust.
- Raithby, John, ed. (1819). Statutes of the Realm. Vol. 6: 1685-94 – via British History Online.
- Pickering, Danby, ed. (1764). "Sessio Secunda. Anno primo Gulielmi & Mariæ". The Statutes at Large. Vol. 9: From the First Year of K. William and Q. Mary to Eighth Year of K. William III – 1688 to 1695–96. Cambridge: Joseph Bentham. pp. 67–75 – via Internet Archive.
- Pickering, Danby, ed. (1764). "Sessio Secunda. Anno primo Gulielmi & Mariæ". The Statutes at Large. Vol. 9: From the First Year of K. William and Q. Mary to Eighth Year of K. William III – 1688 to 1695–96. Cambridge: Joseph Bentham. pp. 67–75 – via Internet Archive.
- Journals of the House of Commons. Vol. 10. London: His Majesty's Stationery Office. 1803. pp. 272–345 – via Google Books.
- Chronological Table of and Index to the Statutes. Vol. 1: To the End of the Session 59 Vict. Sess. 2 (1895) (13th ed.). London: Her Majesty's Stationery Office. 1896. p. 75 – via Google Books.
- Chronological Table of the Statutes: Covering the Period from 1235 to the End of 1971. London: Her Majesty's Stationery Office. 1972. p. 73. ISBN 978-0-11-840096-1 – via Google Books.
- "Acts of the English Parliament from 1688". legislation.gov.uk. The National Archives.
- "Chronological Tables of the Private and Personal Acts: Part 4 (1685–1694)". legislation.gov.uk. The National Archives.

== See also ==
- List of acts of the Parliament of England
