= 1844 in religion =

This is a timeline of events during the year 1844 that relate to religion.

== Events ==
- March 21: the Edict of Toleration (1844) is submitted by the Sublime Porte of the Ottoman Empire, promising to cease the executions of apostates from Islam.
- June 27: Founder of the Latter Day Saint movement Joseph Smith and his brother Hyrum Smith are killed by a mob in Carthage, Illinois.
- October 22: The Great Disappointment occurs in which Millerites are disappointed due to the Second Coming of Jesus Christ not happening on October 22, the date that the Second Coming was predicted to happen by William Miller.
- October 23: The Báb is publicly proclaimed to be the promised one of Islam (the Qá'im, or Mahdi). He is also considered to be simultaneously the return of Elijah, John the Baptist and the "Ushídar-Máh" referred to in the Zoroastrian scriptures.
