= Thomas Dromgoole =

Irish physician and Catholic activist

Thomas Dromgoole, M.D. (1750?–1826?), was an Irish physician.

Dromgoole was born in Ireland somewhere about the middle of the eighteenth century, and took his medical degree at the University of Edinburgh.

He settled as a physician in Dawson Street, Dublin, and became a prominent member of the Catholic board, which met at the beginning of the century to further the cause of Catholic emancipation. With Daniel O'Connell, Dromgoole was an anti-vetoist, that is, he was opposed to the purchase of freedom for the Catholics at the price of giving the government a veto in the appointment of their bishops. In 1813 he made some vigorous speeches on the subject, overthrowing Grattan's contention in the House of Commons that the veto was approved in Ireland, and materially contributing to the temporary defeat of the Catholic Emancipation Bill.

In the following year his speeches were published, together with an anonymous 'Vindication,’ said by Mr. W. J. Fitzpatrick to have been written by Dr. Lanigan, who also, according to the same authority, was the real author of the speeches, though they were 'enunciated through the ponderous trombone of Dromgoole's nasal twang.' Sheil, describing Dromgoole's mode of emphasising the end of each sentence in his speeches by knocking loudly on the ground with a heavy stick, spoke of him as 'a kind of rhetorical paviour.'

Dromgoole's ill-timed outspokenness brought a hornets' nest about his ears; he was satirised by Dr. Brennan under the name of 'Dr. Drumsnuffle,’ and was at last driven into exile, ending his days at Rome under the shadow of the Vatican. He probably died between 1824 and 1829.
