= Convention Parliament (1689) =

Parliament of England held in 1689

The English Convention was an assembly of the Parliament of England which met between 22 January and 12 February 1689 (1688 old style, so its legislation was labelled with that earlier year) and transferred the crowns of England and Ireland from James II to William III and Mary II.

A parallel Scottish Convention met in March 1689 and confirmed that the throne of Scotland was also to be awarded to William and Mary.

== Assemblies of 1688 ==
Immediately following the Glorious Revolution, with King James II of England in flight and Prince William III of Orange nearing London, the Earl of Rochester summoned the Lords Temporal and Lords Spiritual to assemble, and they were joined by the privy councillors on 12 December 1688 to form a provisional government for England. James II returned to London on 16 December; by the 17th he was effectively a prisoner of William who arrived in London the next day. Subsequently, William allowed James to flee in safety, to avoid the ignominy of doing his uncle and father-in-law any immediate harm.

William refused the crown as de facto king and instead called another assembly of peers on 21 December 1688. On 23 December James fled to France. On 26 December the peers were joined by the surviving members of Charles II's Oxford Parliament (from the previous reign), ignoring the MPs who were just elected to James's Loyal Parliament of 1685. The Earl of Nottingham proposed a conditional restoration of King James II, an idea supported by Archbishop Sancroft, but the proposal was rejected and instead the assembly asked William to summon a convention.

== Convention of 1689 ==
The Convention Parliament was elected in January and first met on 22 January 1689. The parliament spent much time arguing over whether James II was considered to have abdicated or abandoned the throne in some manner and who then should take the crown. The Whigs referred to theories of social contract and argued that William alone should now be king. A few 'Radical' Whigs argued for a republic, but most Whigs argued for a limited monarchy.

The Tories favoured the retention of James II, a regency, or William's wife, Mary, alone as queen. Archbishop Sancroft and loyalist bishops preferred that James II be conditionally restored.

On 29 January, it was resolved that England was a Protestant kingdom and only a Protestant could be king, thus disinheriting a Catholic claimant. James was a Roman Catholic.

By the beginning of February, the Commons agreed on the descriptor "abdicated" and that the throne was vacant, but the Lords rejected abdicated as the term was unknown in common law and indicated that even if the throne was vacant, it should automatically pass to the next in line, which implied it was to be Mary.

However, on 6 February the Lords capitulated, primarily since it became apparent that neither Mary nor Anne would agree to rule in place of William. As a compromise, the Lords proposed that William III and Mary II should both take the throne, which the Commons agreed if William alone held regal power.

The parliament drew up a Declaration of Right to address abuses of government under James II and to secure the religion and liberties of Protestants, which was finalised on 12 February.

On 13 February, William and Mary were proclaimed King and Queen of England, Scotland and Ireland. The acceptance of the Crown was conditional not upon acceptance of the Declaration of Right but on the assumption that they rule according to law.

On 23 February 1689, King William III reconvened the Convention into a regular parliament by dissolving it and summoning a new parliament almost a year later.

The actions of the Convention Parliament were regularised in early 1690 by the Crown and Parliament Recognition Act 1689, the first act passed by the regularly elected 2nd Parliament of William and Mary following a new election.

=== Effect on Thirteen Colonies ===
The Convention Parliament of 1689 would be imitated in the Thirteen Colonies, and the use of such conventions as an "instrument of transition" became more acceptable and more often used by the Colonies, resulting most notably in the 1787 Constitutional Convention which drew up the United States Constitution.

== Notable acts of the parliament ==
- Bill of Rights 1688
- Toleration Act 1688
- Mines Royal Act 1688

== See also ==
- 1689 English general election
- List of MPs elected to the English Parliament in 1689
- Carmarthen–Halifax ministry 1689–1690
- Revolutionary breach of legal continuity
- Convention Parliament (England)
