= English general election =

English general election may refer to the following elections to the Parliament of England:

- 1661 English general election
- March 1679 English general election
- October 1679 English general election
- 1681 English general election
- 1685 English general election
- 1689 English general election
- 1690 English general election
- 1695 English general election
- 1698 English general election
- January 1701 English general election
- November 1701 English general election
- 1702 English general election
- 1705 English general election

== See also ==
- List of United Kingdom general elections
