= List of acts of the Parliament of England from 1694 =

This is a list of acts of the Parliament of England for the year 1694.

For acts passed during the period 1707–1800, see the list of acts of the Parliament of Great Britain. See also the list of acts of the Parliament of Scotland, and the list of acts of the Parliament of Ireland.

For acts passed from 1801 onwards, see the list of acts of the Parliament of the United Kingdom. For acts of the devolved parliaments and assemblies in the United Kingdom, see the list of acts of the Scottish Parliament, the list of acts of the Northern Ireland Assembly, and the list of acts and measures of Senedd Cymru; see also the list of acts of the Parliament of Northern Ireland.

For medieval statutes, etc. that are not considered to be acts of Parliament, see the list of English statutes.

See also the List of ordinances and acts of the Parliament of England, 1642–1660 for ordinances and acts passed by the Long Parliament and other bodies without royal assent, and which were not considered to be valid legislation following the Restoration in 1660.

The number shown after each act's title is its chapter number. Acts are cited using this number, preceded by the years of the reign during which the relevant parliamentary session was held; thus the Union with Ireland Act 1800 is cited as "39 & 40 Geo. 3. c. 67", meaning the 67th act passed during the session that started in the 39th year of the reign of George III and which finished in the 40th year of that reign. The modern convention is to use Arabic numerals in citations (thus "41 Geo. 3" rather than "41 Geo. III"). Acts of the last session of the Parliament of Great Britain and the first session of the Parliament of the United Kingdom are both cited as "41 Geo. 3".

Acts passed by the Parliament of England did not have a short title; however, some of these acts have subsequently been given a short title by acts of the Parliament of the United Kingdom, such as the Short Titles Act 1896 (59 & 60 Vict. c. 14).

Acts passed by the Parliament of England were deemed to have come into effect on the first day of the session in which they were passed. Because of this, the years given in the list below may in fact be the year before a particular act was passed.

== 5 & 6 Will. & Mar. ==
Continuing the fifth session of the 2nd Parliament of William and Mary, which met from 7 November 1693 until 25 April 1694.

This session was also traditionally cited as 5 & 6 Will. & Mary, 5 & 6 Gul. & Mar., 5 & 6 Gul. et Mar. or 5 & 6 W. & M.

=== Public acts ===
Short title	Citation	Royal assent
Long title
House of Commons (Disqualification) Act 1693 (repealed)	5 & 6 Will. & Mar. c. 7 (Note: Although passed on the same day as the first acts listed in 5 & 6 Will. & Mar., this act is normally listed under 5 Will. & Mar.); 5 Will. & Mar. c. 7	23 March 1694
An Act for granting to their Majesties certain Rates and Duties upon Salt and upon Beer, Ale and other Liquors for secureing certaine Recompences and Advantages in the said Act mencioed to such Persons as shall voluntarily advance the summ of Ten hundred thousand Pounds towards carrying on the Warr against France. (Note: The Nine Years' War.) (Repealed by House of Commons Disqualification Act 1957 (5 & 6 Eliz. 2. c. 20))
Insolvent Debtors Relief Act 1694 (repealed)	5 & 6 Will. & Mar. c. 8	23 March 1694
An Act for the explaining and for the more effectual execution of a former Act (Note: Insolvent Debtors Relief Act 1690 (2 Will. & Mar. Sess. 2. c. 15)) for the relief of poor Prisoners. (Repealed by Statute Law Revision Act 1867 (30 & 31 Vict. c. 59))
Cloth Weavers Act 1694 (repealed)	5 & 6 Will. & Mar. c. 9	23 March 1694
An Act for repeal of a Clause in the Statute of the Fifth yeare of Queen Elizabeth (Note: Statute of Artificers 1562 (5 Eliz. 1. c. 4)) (containing diverse Orders for Artificers and others) which relates to Weavers of Cloath. (Repealed by Statute Law Revision Act 1867 (30 & 31 Vict. c. 59))
Orphans, London Act 1694 (repealed)	5 & 6 Will. & Mar. c. 10	23 March 1694
An Act for Relief of the Orphans and other Creditors of the City of London. (Repealed by Statute Law (Repeals) Act 2013 (c. 2))
Quarter Sessions Delays Act 1694 (repealed)	5 & 6 Will. & Mar. c. 11	23 March 1694
An Act to prevent Delays of Proceedings att the Quarter Sessions of the Peace. (Repealed by Administration of Justice (Miscellaneous Provisions) Act 1938 (1 & 2 Geo. 6. c. 63))
Capiatur Fine Act 1694 (repealed)	5 & 6 Will. & Mar. c. 12	23 March 1694
An Act to take away the Processe for the Capiatur Fine in the several Courts att Westminster. (Repealed by Statute Law Revision Act 1867 (30 & 31 Vict. c. 59))
Pardon of Felony Act 1694 (repealed)	5 & 6 Will. & Mar. c. 13	23 March 1694
An Act to repeal the Statute made in the Tenth yeare of King Edward the Third (Note: 10 Edw. 3. Stat. 1. c. 3) for finding sureties for the good abearing by him or her that hath a pardon of Felony. (Repealed by Repeal of Obsolete Statutes Act 1856 (19 & 20 Vict. c. 64))
Poll Tax Act 1694 (repealed)	5 & 6 Will. & Mar. c. 14	16 April 1694
An Act for raiseing money by a Poll payable quarterly for One yeare for carrying on a vigorous Warr against France. (Repealed by Statute Law Revision Act 1867 (30 & 31 Vict. c. 59))
Mutiny Act 1694 (repealed)	5 & 6 Will. & Mar. c. 15	16 April 1694
An Act for continuing the Act (Note: Mutiny Act 1692 (4 Will. & Mar. c. 13)) for punishing Officers and Souldiers who shall mutiny or desert their Majesties. Service and for punishing false Musters and for the Payment of Quarters for One Yeare longer. (Repealed by Statute Law Revision Act 1867 (30 & 31 Vict. c. 59))
Importation Act 1694 (repealed)	5 & 6 Will. & Mar. c. 16	16 April 1694
An Act for the Importation of Salt-Petre for One Yeare. (Repealed by Statute Law Revision Act 1867 (30 & 31 Vict. c. 59))
Exportation Act 1694 (repealed)	5 & 6 Will. & Mar. c. 17	16 April 1694
An Act for the Exportation of Iron, Copper and Mundick Mettal. (Repealed by Statute Law Revision Act 1867 (30 & 31 Vict. c. 59))
Duchy of Cornwall Act 1694 (repealed)	5 & 6 Will. & Mar. c. 18	25 April 1694
An Act for enableing theire Majesties to make Grants Leases and Copies of Offices Lands and Hereditaments Parcell of theire Dutchy of Cornwall or annexed to the same and for Confirmacion of Leases and Grants already made. (Repealed by Statute Law Revision Act 1948 (11 & 12 Geo. 6. c. 62))
Militia Act 1694 (repealed)	5 & 6 Will. & Mar. c. 19	25 April 1694
An Act for Raising the Militia of this Kingdom, for the Year One thousand six hundred ninety four, although the Months Pay formerly advanced be not repaid. (Repealed by Statute Law Revision Act 1867 (30 & 31 Vict. c. 59))
Bank of England Act 1694 or the Tonnage Act 1694	5 & 6 Will. & Mar. c. 20	25 April 1694
An Act for granting to theire Majesties severall Rates and Duties upon Tunnage of Shipps and Vessells and upon Beere Ale and other Liquors for secureing certaine Recompenses and Advantages in the said Act mentioned to such Persons as shall voluntarily advance the sūme of Fifteene hundred thousand pounds towards the carrying on the Warr against France.
Stamps Act 1694 (repealed)	5 & 6 Will. & Mar. c. 21	25 April 1694
An Act for granting to theire Majesties severall Dutyes upon Velum Parchment and Paper for Four Yeares towards carryyng on the warr against France. (Repealed by Inland Revenue Repeal Act 1870 (33 & 34 Vict. c. 99))
Hackney Coaches, etc. Act 1694 (repealed)	5 & 6 Will. & Mar. c. 22	25 April 1694
An Act for the lycenseing and regulateing Hackney-Coaches and Stage-Coaches. (Repealed by Statute Law Revision Act 1867 (30 & 31 Vict. c. 59))
Public Accounts Act 1694 (repealed)	5 & 6 Will. & Mar. c. 23	25 April 1694
An Act for appointing and enableing Commissioners to examine take and state the Publicke Accompts of the Kingdome. (Repealed by Statute Law Revision Act 1867 (30 & 31 Vict. c. 59))
Ships Act 1694 (repealed)	5 & 6 Will. & Mar. c. 24	25 April 1694
An Act for building good and defensible Shipps. (Repealed by Statute Law Revision Act 1867 (30 & 31 Vict. c. 59))
Navy Act 1694 (repealed)	5 & 6 Will. & Mar. c. 25	25 April 1694
An Act for the better discipline of theire Majesties Navy Royall. (Repealed by Statute Law Revision Act 1867 (30 & 31 Vict. c. 59))

=== Private acts ===
Short title	Citation	Royal assent
Long title
Estates of Roger and Thomas Whitley in Cheshire Act 1694	5 & 6 Will. & Mar. c. 3 Pr.	23 March 1694
An Act to enable Roger Whitley the Elder Esquire and Thomas Whitley Esquire to exchange certain Lands, of equal Value, within the County of Chester.
Payment of George Turner's Debts Act 1694	5 & 6 Will. & Mar. c. 4 Pr.	23 March 1694
An Act for Payment of the Debts of George Turner Esquire deceased.
Enabling Sir Charles Barrington to make a jointure for his wife Dame Bridget and to provide for his children.	5 & 6 Will. & Mar. c. 5 Pr.	23 March 1694
An Act to enable Sir Charles Barrington Baronet to settle a Jointure on Dame Bridget his Wife, and to make Provision for their Younger Children.
Enabling the Earl of Thanet and Sackville Tufton to lease Thanet House in St. Botolph, Aldersgate.	5 & 6 Will. & Mar. c. 6 Pr.	23 March 1694
An Act to enable Thomas Earl of Thanett, and the Honourable Sackville Tufton Esquire, his Brother, to make a Lease for Sixty Years of Thanet House, in the Parish of St. Buttolph's Aldersgate, to commence after the Remainder of the Term of One and Thirty Years now in Being.
Henry Frere's Estate Act 1694	5 & 6 Will. & Mar. c. 7 Pr.	23 March 1694
An Act for Sale of Part of the Estate of Henry Frere, an Infant, to raise Monies, for inning and recovering other Parts thereof now under Water, and for Payment of Debts charged thereon.
Bridge Over the River Axe Act 1694	5 & 6 Will. & Mar. c. 8 Pr.	23 March 1694
An Act for making a Bridge over the River Axe, in the County of Somersett.
John Whitehall's Estate Act 1694	5 & 6 Will. & Mar. c. 9 Pr.	23 March 1694
An Act to enable John Whitehall to charge certain Lands with the Sum of One Thousand and Five Hundred Pounds, towards Portions for his Younger Children.
Susan and Dorothy Chaplyn's Estate Act 1694	5 & 6 Will. & Mar. c. 10 Pr.	23 March 1694
An Act for Sale of the Estate of Susan Chaplin and Dorothy Chaplin her Daughter, for Payment of Debts, and making a Provision for the said Susan and Dorothy.
Alice Turner's and her Children's Estate Act 1694	5 & 6 Will. & Mar. c. 11 Pr.	23 March 1694
An Act to enable the Trustees of Alice Turner Widow, and her Children, to make Sale of certain Houses and Ground, in or near Lincolne's Inne Fields, in the County of Midd'x, during the Minority of the Younger Children.
Thomas Edwards' Estate Act 1694	5 & 6 Will. & Mar. c. 12 Pr.	23 March 1694
An Act to enable Thomas Edwards to sell Part of his Estate, for the Payment of Debts; and to restrain and disable him to commit Waste upon the Residue of the said Estate.
Charles Turner's Estate Act 1694	5 & 6 Will. & Mar. c. 13 Pr.	23 March 1694
An Act for settling the Inheritance of some Parts of the Estate of Charles Turner Esquire (which lie dispersed) in himself and his Heirs; and settling an entire Estate, of greater Value, in Lieu thereof, to the Uses the said other Parts of his Estate were settled.
William Stevens' Estate Act 1694	5 & 6 Will. & Mar. c. 14 Pr.	23 March 1694
An Act for Sale of the Estate of William Stevens deceased, for Payment of the Mortgage thereupon, and applying the Overplus for the Benefit of his Sons who are Infants.
Mildmay's and Dixy's Estate Act 1694	5 & 6 Will. & Mar. c. 15 Pr.	23 March 1694
An Act to vest the Estate of Mary, Elizabeth, and Anne Mildmay, and Edward Dixie and Arabella his Wife, and Lucy and Anne Mildmay, in Trustees, to be sold, for Satisfaction of Mortgages and Debts thereupon, and preserving the Overplus for their Benefit.
Maynard's Estate Act 1694	5 & 6 Will. & Mar. c. 16 Pr.	16 April 1694
An Act for settling the Estate of Sir John Maynard Knight, deceased, late One of the Lords Commissioners for the Custody of the Great Seal of England.
Payment of the late John Lord Stawell's debts.	5 & 6 Will. & Mar. c. 17 Pr.	16 April 1694
An Act for Payment of the Debts of John Lord Stawell, lately deceased.
Nathaniel Brent's Estate Act 1694	5 & 6 Will. & Mar. c. 18 Pr.	16 April 1694
An Act to enable Trustees to sell Part of the Estate of Nathaniel Brent Gentleman, deceased, to raise Money, for Payment of his Debts, and Maintenance for his Children, who are Infants.
Sale of a third part of the manor of Lekby and other lands in Yorkshire and settlement of a farm and lands in Terling and Mack Leighs in Essex to the same uses.	5 & 6 Will. & Mar. c. 19 Pr.	16 April 1694
An Act for the vesting the Third Part of the Manor of Leckby, alias Letby, and other Lands in the County of Yorke, in Trustees, to be sold; and for settling a Farm and other Lands in Terling and Much Leighs, in the County of Essex, of greater Value, to and upon the same Uses.
Parish of St. John of Wapping Act 1694	5 & 6 Will. & Mar. c. 20 Pr.	16 April 1694
An Act for erecting a new Parish, to be called the Parish of St. John of Wapping, in the County of Middl'x.
Naturalization of Johanna D'Offerel and others.	5 & 6 Will. & Mar. c. 22 Pr.	25 April 1694
An Act for naturalizing Johanna D'offarrell, an Infant, and her Sister, and Two Brothers, and others.
Sir James Beverly's Estate Act 1694	5 & 6 Will. & Mar. c. 21 Pr.	25 April 1694
An Act for vesting in Trustees the Estate late of Sir James Beverley, in Huntingtonshire, to be sold.

=== Sources ===
- Raithby, John, ed. (1963) [1819]. "5° & 6° Gul. & Mar.". Statutes of the Realm. Vol. 6: The Statutes of King James II, and King William and Queen Mary (1685–1694). London: Dawsons. pp. 462–507 – via HathiTrust.
- Raithby, John, ed. (1819). Statutes of the Realm. Vol. 6: 1685-94 – via British History Online.
- Pickering, Danby, ed. (1764). "Anno quinto & sexto Gulielmi & Mariæ". The Statutes at Large. Vol. 9: From the First Year of K. William and Q. Mary to Eighth Year of K. William III – 1688 to 1695–96. Cambridge: Joseph Bentham. pp. 244–328 – via Internet Archive.
- Pickering, Danby, ed. (1764). "Anno quinto & sexto Gulielmi & Mariæ". The Statutes at Large. Vol. 9: From the First Year of K. William and Q. Mary to Eighth Year of K. William III – 1688 to 1695–96. Cambridge: Joseph Bentham. pp. 244–328 – via Internet Archive.
- Chronological Table of and Index to the Statutes. Vol. 1: To the End of the Session 59 Vict. Sess. 2 (1895) (13th ed.). London: Her Majesty's Stationery Office. 1896. p. 77 – via Google Books.
- "Acts of the English Parliament from 1694". legislation.gov.uk. The National Archives.
- "Chronological Tables of the Private and Personal Acts: Part 4 (1685–1694)". legislation.gov.uk. The National Archives.

== 6 & 7 Will. & Mar. ==
The sixth session of the 2nd Parliament of William and Mary, which met from 12 November 1694 until 3 May 1695.

This session was also traditionally cited as 6 & 7 Will. & Mary, 6 & 7 Gul. & Mar., 6 & 7 Gul. et Mar., 6 & 7 W. & M., 6 & 7 Will. 3, 6 & 7 Gul. 3 or 6 & 7 W. 3.

=== Public acts ===
Short title	Citation	Royal assent
Long title
Taxation (No. 2) Act 1694 (repealed)	6 & 7 Will. & Mar. c. 1	22 December 1694
An Act for granting to their Majesties a Subsidy of Tonnage and Poundage and other summs of money payable upon Merchandizes exported and imported. (Repealed by Statute Law Revision Act 1867 (30 & 31 Vict. c. 59))
Meeting of Parliament Act 1694 or the Triennial Act 1694	6 & 7 Will. & Mar. c. 2	22 December 1694
An Act for the frequent Meeting and calling of Parliaments.
Taxation (No. 3) Act 1694 (repealed)	6 & 7 Will. & Mar. c. 3	11 February 1695
An Act for granting to his Majestie an Aide of Four shillings in the Pound for One Yeare and for applying the yearely summe of Three hundred thousand Poundes for Five years out of the Dutyes of Tunnage and Poundage and other summes of money payable upon Merchandizes exported and imported for carrying on the Warr against France with vigour. (Repealed by Statute Law Revision Act 1867 (30 & 31 Vict. c. 59))
Exemptions of Apothecaries Act 1694 (repealed)	6 & 7 Will. & Mar. c. 4	11 February 1695
An Act for exempting Apothecaries from serving the offices of Constable Scavenger and other Parish and Ward Offices and from serving upon Juries. (Repealed by Statute Law Revision Act 1867 (30 & 31 Vict. c. 59) and Statute Law Revision Act 1948 (11 & 12 Geo. 6. c. 62))
Government Life Annuities Act 1694 (repealed)	6 & 7 Will. & Mar. c. 5	22 April 1695
An Act for enabling such persons as have Estates for life in Annuities payable by several former Acts therein mencioned to purchase and obtaine further or more certaine interests in such Annuities and in default thereof for admitting other persons to purchase or obtaine the same for raiseing moneys for carrying one the Warr against France. (Repealed by Statute Law Revision Act 1867 (30 & 31 Vict. c. 59))
Marriage Duty Act 1694 or the Registration Tax Act 1694 (repealed)	6 & 7 Will. & Mar. c. 6	22 April 1695
An Act for granting to his Majesty certaine rates and duties upon Marriages Births and Burials and upon Batchelors and Widowers for the terme of Five yeares for carrying on the Warr against France with Vigour. (Repealed by Inland Revenue Repeal Act 1870 (33 & 34 Vict. c. 99))
Taxation (No. 4) Act 1694 (repealed)	6 & 7 Will. & Mar. c. 7	22 April 1695
An Act for granting to his Majestie several additional Duties upon Coffee Tea Chocolate and Spices towards satisfaction of the debts due for Transport Service for the reduction of Ireland. (Repealed by Statute Law Revision Act 1867 (30 & 31 Vict. c. 59))
Mutiny (No. 2) Act 1694 (repealed)	6 & 7 Will. & Mar. c. 8	22 April 1695
An Act for continuing Two former Acts for punishing Officers and Soldiers who shall mutiny or desert his Majesties service & for punishing false musters and for payment of quarters for one yeare longer. (Repealed by Statute Law Revision Act 1867 (30 & 31 Vict. c. 59))
Public Accounts Act 1694 (repealed)	6 & 7 Will. & Mar. c. 9	22 April 1695
An Act for appointing and enableing Commissioners to examine take and state the Publick Accounts. (Repealed by Statute Law Revision Act 1867 (30 & 31 Vict. c. 59))
Newcastle (Sale of Coal by Measured Keel) Act 1694 (repealed)	6 & 7 Will. & Mar. c. 10	22 April 1695
An Act for the better Admeasurement of Keels and Keel-Boats in the Port of Newcastle & the Members thereunto belonging. (Repealed by Statute Law Revision Act 1948 (11 & 12 Geo. 6. c. 62))
Profane Swearing Act 1694 (repealed)	6 & 7 Will. & Mar. c. 11	22 April 1695
An Act for the more effectuall suppressing prophane Cursing and Swearing. (Repealed by Profane Oaths Act 1745 (19 Geo. 2. c. 21))
Stamps (Amendment) Act 1694 (repealed)	6 & 7 Will. & Mar. c. 12	22 April 1695
An Act for explaineing and regulateing several Doubts Duties and Penalties in the late Act for granting several Duties upon Velum Parchment and Paper and for ascertaineing the Admeasurement of the Tunnage of Ships. (Repealed by Inland Revenue Repeal Act 1870 (33 & 34 Vict. c. 99))
Militia, etc. Act 1694 (repealed)	6 & 7 Will. & Mar. c. 13	22 April 1695
An Act for raiseing the Militia of this Kingdome for the Yeare One thousand six hundred ninety five and for repealing the Statute of the Second & Third Yeare of King Edward the Sixth intituled "An Act against shooting in Hail-Shot." (Note: Hail-shot Act 1548 (2 & 3 Edw. 6. c. 14)) (Repealed by Statute Law Revision Act 1867 (30 & 31 Vict. c. 59))
Continuance of Laws Act 1694 (repealed)	6 & 7 Will. & Mar. c. 14	22 April 1695
An Act for continuing several Laws therein mentioned. (Note: Benefit of Clergy, etc. Act 1691 (3 Will. & Mar. c. 9)) (Note: Fraudulent Devises Act 1691 (3 Will. & Mar. c. 14)) (Note: Judgment Act 1692 (4 Will. & Mar. c. 20)) (Repealed by Statute Law Revision Act 1867 (30 & 31 Vict. c. 59))
Sir Thomas Cooke's Indemnity Act 1694 (repealed)	6 & 7 Will. & Mar. c. 15	22 April 1695
An Act to indempnifie Sir Thomas Cooke from Actions which hee might bee liable to by reason of his discovering to whom hee paid and distributed several summs of money therein mencioned to bee received out of the Treasure of the East-India Company or for any prosecution for such distribution. (Repealed by Statute Law Revision Act 1948 (11 & 12 Geo. 6. c. 62))
Thames Navigation Act 1694 (repealed)	6 & 7 Will. & Mar. c. 16	22 April 1695
An Act to prevent Exactions of the Occupiers of Locks and Weares upon the River of Thames westward and for ascertaining the Rates of Water-carriage upon the said River. (Repealed by Thames and Isis Navigation Act 1750 (24 Geo. 2. c. 8))
Coin Act 1694 (repealed)	6 & 7 Will. & Mar. c. 17	3 May 1695
An Act to prevent counterfeiting and clipping the coine of this Kingdom. (Repealed by Statute Law Revision Act 1867 (30 & 31 Vict. c. 59))
Taxation (No. 5) Act 1694 (repealed)	6 & 7 Will. & Mar. c. 18	3 May 1695
An Act for granting to His Majestie certaine Duties upon Glasse Wares, Stone and Earthen Bottles, Coals, and Culme, for carrying on the War against France. (Repealed by Statute Law Revision Act 1867 (30 & 31 Vict. c. 59))
Sir Thomas Cooke, etc. (East India Company Transactions) Act 1694 (repealed)	6 & 7 Will. & Mar. c. 19	3 May 1695
An Act for imprisoning Sir Thomas Cook, Sir Bazill Firebrace, Charles Bates Esq. and James Craggs and restraining them from aliening their estates. (Repealed by Statute Law Revision Act 1948 (11 & 12 Geo. 6. c. 62))
General Pardon Act 1694 (repealed)	6 & 7 Will. & Mar. c. 20	3 May 1695
An Act for the Kings most gracious general and free pardon. (Repealed by Statute Law Revision Act 1867 (30 & 31 Vict. c. 59))

=== Private acts ===
Short title	Citation	Royal assent
Long title
Warwick Fire Rebuilding, &c. Act 1694 (repealed)	6 & 7 Will. & Mar. c. 1 Pr.	11 February 1695
An Act for re-building the Town of Warwick, and for determining Differences touching Houses burnt or demolished by reason of the late dreadful Fire there. (Repealed by Statute Law (Repeals) Act 1995 (c. 44))
George Pitt's Estate Act 1694	6 & 7 Will. & Mar. c. 2 Pr.	15 March 1695
An Act for supplying certain Defects in the Directions made in and by a Deed of Trust, and the last Will of George Pitt Esquire deceased, for settling his Estate.
Naturalization of Bernard Cosserat, Alexander Pringli and others.	6 & 7 Will. & Mar. c. 3 Pr.	15 March 1695
An Act for naturalizing of Bernard Cosserat, alias Mourte, and Alexander Ringli, and others.
For settling manors and lands upon the Marquis of Tavistock's marriage.	6 & 7 Will. & Mar. c. 4 Pr.	22 April 1695
An Act for settling divers Manors and Lands upon the Marriage of the Marquis of Tavistock, Grandson of the Duke of Bedford.
Earl of Salisbury's Estate Act 1694	6 & 7 Will. & Mar. c. 5 Pr.	22 April 1695
An Act to enable the Guardians of James Earl of Salisbury, to make Leases of Salisbury House, and some other Hereditaments in The Strand, in the County of Midd'x, for Improvement thereof by Building.
Confirmation of two indentures tripartite, of lease and release, made by Thomas, Earl of Thanett Island, Sackville Tufton, William Cheyne and Sir Charles Tufton, and of the estates thereby settled.	6 & 7 Will. & Mar. c. 6 Pr.	22 April 1695
An Act for confirming Two Indentures Tripartite, the one of Lease, and the other of Release, made between the Right Honourable Thomas Earl of Thanet Island of the First Part, the Honourable Sackvile Tuston Esquire of the Second Part, and the Honourable William Cheyney Esquire and Sir Charles Tufton Knight of the Third Part, and the Estates thereby settled.
Earl of Rochester's Estate Act 1694	6 & 7 Will. & Mar. c. 7 Pr.	22 April 1695
An Act for the dividing and settling the Estate of the Coheirs of John late Earl of Rochester, and for discharging the Trusts thereupon.
Sale of manors of Earls Croome and Baughton (Worcestershire), settlement of the manor house and royalty of Wainfleet St. Mary (Lincolnshire) to the same uses and enabling Sir Robert Barham to make provision for younger children.	6 & 7 Will. & Mar. c. 8 Pr.	22 April 1695
An Act for the vesting the Manors of Earls Croome, alias Jeffery's Croome, and Baughton, in the County of Worcester, in Trustees, to be sold; and for settling the Manor-house and Royalty of Waynfleet St. Marye's, in the County of Lincoln, and divers Lands Parcel of the said Manor, of greater Value, to and upon the same Uses; and to enable Sir Robert Barkham Baronet to make Provision for his Younger Children.
Sir Jarvase Clifton's Estate Act 1694	6 & 7 Will. & Mar. c. 9 Pr.	22 April 1695
An Act to vest in Trustees certain Lands of Sir Gervase Clifton Baronet, in the County of Nottingham, for Payment of Debts, and raising Portions for Younger Children.
Christchurch parish (Surrey): enabling the making of rates to provide a minister and empowering the trustees of John Marshall, deceased, to employ money to finish the church.	6 & 7 Will. & Mar. c. 10 Pr.	22 April 1695
An Act for enabling the Inhabitants of the Parish of Christ Church, in the County of Surry, to make Rates, for raising a Maintenance for a good and able Minister; and for the empowering the Trustees of the Will of John Marshall deceased to employ Monies for the finishing the said Parish Church.
Confirmation of a grant by the rector of the united parishes of St. Michael Royal and St. Martin's in the Vintrey, London, of part of St. Martin's churchyard.	6 & 7 Will. & Mar. c. 11 Pr.	22 April 1695
An Act to confirm a Grant made by the Rector of the united Parishes of St. Michael Royall and St. Martin's in the Vintry, London, of Part of St. Martin's Church-yard.
Henry Northley's Estate Act 1694: leasing for payment of debts and maintenance for children.	6 & 7 Will. & Mar. c. 12 Pr.	22 April 1695
An Act to enable Trustees to grant Leases of the Lands of Henry Northleigh Esquire, lately deceased, for Payment of his Debts, and providing a Maintenance for his Children.
John Estoft's Estate Act 1694	6 & 7 Will. & Mar. c. 13 Pr.	22 April 1695
An Act to vest certain Lands and Tenements, late of John Estoft, of Etton, in the County of York, Esquire, in Trustees, to be sold, towards Payment of the Debts of the said John Estoft, and raising Portions for his Daughters.
Jane Rogers' Estate Act 1694	6 & 7 Will. & Mar. c. 14 Pr.	22 April 1695
An Act to enable Jane Rogers, the Widow and Relict of Bryan Rogers, late of Falmouth, Merchant, deceased, and Administratrix of his Goods and Chattells, with his Will annexed, and other Trustees therein named, to sell Lands, for the Payment of the Debts and Legacies of the said Bryan Rogers, in Performance of his said Will.
Ratifying and confirming an indenture of lease of Martin Meare (Lancashire) made by Earl of Derby and others to Thomas Fleetwood.	6 & 7 Will. & Mar. c. 15 Pr.	22 April 1695
An Act for the ratifying and confirming a certain Indenture of Lease of Marton Meare, in the County of Lancaster, made by the Earl of Derby and others, to Thomas Fleetwood Esquire.
Joseph Finch's Estate Act 1694	6 & 7 Will. & Mar. c. 16 Pr.	22 April 1695
An Act to vest certain Lands and Tenements in Trustees, to be sold, for the better Provision of the Daughters and Coheirs of Joseph Finch Esquire, deceased.
John Caryle's Estate Act 1694	6 & 7 Will. & Mar. c. 17 Pr.	22 April 1695
An Act to vest in Trustees certain Lands in Kent and Sussex, of John Caryll Esquire, for the Payment of Debts, and raising of Portions for Younger Children; and to supply the Defects of a Conveyance intended for those Purposes.
Sir William Chaitor's Estate Act 1694	6 & 7 Will. & Mar. c. 18 Pr.	22 April 1695
An Act to vest certain Lands of Sir William Chaitor Baronet, in Yorkshire and Durham, to be sold, for Payment of Debts charged thereon, and to secure Portions for Younger Children.
Enabling Sir Paul and Dame Jane Whitchott to make leases of manor of Tooting Gravenay and lands in Tooting Gravenay, Tooting Bec and Streatham (Surrey).	6 & 7 Will. & Mar. c. 19 Pr.	22 April 1695
An Act for enabling Sir Paul Whichcot Knight and Baronet, and Dame Jane his Wife, to make Leases for 99 Years, of the Manor of Tooting Graveney, and any of their Messuages, Lands, and Hereditaments, in Tooting Graveney, Tooting Beake, and Stretham, in the County of Surrey, for the better Improvement thereof.
William Wanley's Estate Act 1694	6 & 7 Will. & Mar. c. 20 Pr.	22 April 1695
An Act to enable William Wanley, an Infant under the Age of One and Twenty Years, to new build several Messuages or Tenements in Ax-Yard, King Street, Westm'r; and to enable his Guardian to make One or more Lease or Leases for effecting the same.
Jonathon Webb's Estate Act 1694	6 & 7 Will. & Mar. c. 21 Pr.	22 April 1695
An Act for Sale of Part of the Estate of Jonathan Webb Esquire, for Discharge of Debts and Incumbrances charged thereupon.
Enabling Elizabeth, widow of John Howland, to settle lands upon marriage of his sole daughter and heir; settling lands on Elizabeth for her life in lieu of dower and indemnifying her and Sir Josias Child in disposing of the personal estate of said heir on her preferment in marriage, she being under 21 years old.	6 & 7 Will. & Mar. c. 22 Pr.	22 April 1695
An Act to enable Elizabeth Howland, the Widow of John Howland Esquire deceased, to settle Lands upon the Marriage of his sole Daughter and Heir; and for settling Lands upon the said Widow Howland for her Life, in Lieu of Dower; and for indemnifying Sir Josias Child and the said Widow Howland, Grandfather and Mother of the said Heir, in disposing of the Personal Estate belonging to her, upon her Preferment in Marriage, she being under Age of One and Twenty Years.
George Gilbert Pierce's Estate Act 1694	6 & 7 Will. & Mar. c. 23 Pr.	22 April 1695
An Act for the vesting certain Lands and Tenements, the Estate of George Gilbert Pierce, of The Middle Temple, London, Esquire, in Trustees, for the raising Monies for the Payment of his Debts.
Making Saltwater Fresh Act 1694	6 & 7 Will. & Mar. c. 24 Pr.	22 April 1695
An Act for making Salt Water fresh.
William Gage's Estate Act 1694	6 & 7 Will. & Mar. c. 25 Pr.	22 April 1695
An Act to enable Trustees of William Gage Esquire to raise Money, by a Mortgage of Part of his Estate, for the Preservation of the Timber growing thereon.
Sir Thomas Hare's Estate Act 1694	6 & 7 Will. & Mar. c. 26 Pr.	22 April 1695
An Act for the better enabling the Executors and Trustees of Sir Thomas Hare Baronet, lately deceased, to raise Portions and Maintenances for his Younger Children.
Enabling Peter Gollop to sell a farm and lands called Wantsly subject to payment of £1000 and interest to the executory estate of Robert Merefield, deceased.	6 & 7 Will. & Mar. c. 27 Pr.	22 April 1695
An Act to enable Peter Gollop Gentleman to sell a Farm and certain Lands called Wantsley; and to vest the Inheritance thereof, in Fee Simple, in such Person or Persons who shall be Purchaser or Purchasers thereof from him, subject only to the Payment of the Sum of One Thousand Pounds Principal-money, with the Interest thereof due and to grow due, unto the Executory Estate of Robert Merefeild Gentleman, deceased.
John Kirke's Estate Act 1694	6 & 7 Will. & Mar. c. 28 Pr.	22 April 1695
An Act for selling the Estate of John Kirke deceased, for Payment of his Debts.
Hannah and Jonathon Woollaston's Estate Act 1694	6 & 7 Will. & Mar. c. 29 Pr.	22 April 1695
An Act to enable Hannah Woollaston Widow, and Jonathan her Son an Insant, to sell certain Lands and Tenements, in Warnford, in the County of Southampton, for Payment of Debts and Legacies, according to the Will of Richard Woollaston Esquire, deceased.
Leisler's Restoration Act 1695	6 & 7 Will. & Mar. c. 30 Pr.	3 May 1695
An Act for reversing the Attainder of Jacob Leister and others.

=== Sources ===
- Raithby, John, ed. (1963) [1819]. "6° & 7° Gul. & Mar.". Statutes of the Realm. Vol. 6: The Statutes of King James II, and King William and Queen Mary (1685–1694). London: Dawsons. pp. 508–615 – via HathiTrust.
- Raithby, John, ed. (1819). Statutes of the Realm. Vol. 6: 1685-94 – via British History Online.
- Pickering, Danby, ed. (1764). "Anno sexto Gulielmi & Mariæ". The Statutes at Large. Vol. 9: From the First Year of K. William and Q. Mary to Eighth Year of K. William III – 1688 to 1695–96. Cambridge: Joseph Bentham. pp. 328–332 – via Internet Archive.
- Pickering, Danby, ed. (1764). "Anno sexto Gulielmi & Mariæ". The Statutes at Large. Vol. 9: From the First Year of K. William and Q. Mary to Eighth Year of K. William III – 1688 to 1695–96. Cambridge: Joseph Bentham. pp. 328–332 – via Internet Archive.
- Pickering, Danby, ed. (1764). "Anno sexto & septimo Gulielmi & Mariæ". The Statutes at Large. Vol. 9: From the First Year of K. William and Q. Mary to Eighth Year of K. William III – 1688 to 1695–96. Cambridge: Joseph Bentham. pp. 332–380 – via Internet Archive.
- Pickering, Danby, ed. (1764). "Anno sexto & septimo Gulielmi & Mariæ". The Statutes at Large. Vol. 9: From the First Year of K. William and Q. Mary to Eighth Year of K. William III – 1688 to 1695–96. Cambridge: Joseph Bentham. pp. 332–380 – via Internet Archive.
- Chronological Table of and Index to the Statutes. Vol. 1: To the End of the Session 59 Vict. Sess. 2 (1895) (13th ed.). London: Her Majesty's Stationery Office. 1896. p. 77 – via Google Books.
- "Acts of the English Parliament from 1694". legislation.gov.uk. The National Archives.
- "Chronological Tables of the Private and Personal Acts: Part 4 (1685–1694)". legislation.gov.uk. The National Archives.

== See also ==
- List of acts of the Parliament of England
