= Mutiny Acts =

17/18th-century series of English/British laws regulating the armed forces

The Mutiny Acts were an 159-year series of annual acts passed by the Parliament of England, the Parliament of Great Britain, and the Parliament of the United Kingdom for governing, regulating, provisioning, and funding the English and later British Army.

The first Mutiny Act was passed in 1689 in response to the mutiny of a large portion of the army which stayed loyal to James II upon William III taking the crown of England. The Mutiny Act, altered in 1803, and the Articles of War defined the nature and punishment of mutiny until the latter were replaced by the Army Discipline and Regulation Act 1879 (42 & 43 Vict. c. 33). In 1881, this was in turn replaced by the Army Act – An Act to consolidate the Army Discipline and Regulation Act, 1879, and the subsequent Acts amending the Same. This was extended or amended or consolidated annually (the most recent update having been made in 1995). Today, mutiny by British forces is punished under the Armed Forces Act 2006.

Depending on events, additions, and changes within the established system more than one Mutiny Act might be passed within a given year. Within the empire specific geographical disturbances were sometimes governed by specific acts, such as the Mutiny, East Indies Act 1754 (27 Geo. 2. c. 9), or the Mutiny, America Act from 1765 (5 Geo. 3. c. 33) to 1776 (16 Geo. 3. c. 11). A closely related series of Marine Mutiny Acts starting in 1755 (28 Geo. 2. c. 11) would regulate His Majesty's Marine Forces while on shore, and continue well into the 19th century.

== Background ==
During the Middle Ages, European rulers applied the same laws to both civilian and military populations. Because of this, military law (law governing armed forces) and martial law (control of society by the military) were not independent legal approaches. Rulers began separating the laws governing the civilian population and the laws for the armed forces as the medieval period drew to a close.

In England, William the Conqueror's Aural Regis (or King's Court) assisted him in ruling both his armed forces and the English population. Over time, this court divided and developed specialized legal expertise. King Edward I created a Court of Chivalry headed by the Lord High Constable and the Earl Marshal, two members of the King's Court. This Court of Chivalry was given authority over cases of military law, chivalry, heraldry, and murder or high treason overseas. The army was seen as the crown's personal force. Its governance, as a military force, was the crown's royal prerogative. The crown governed the military by publishing articles of war. These articles applied to the army during a specific war or campaign. The Court of Chivalry assisted the crown by preparing these articles and enforcing them. Therefore, military law could and would change depending on the campaign or war. Although harsh, the articles were clear in their expectations for military personnel.

Meanwhile, courts of equity and courts of common law developed and were given authority to govern civilians. Common law did not have rules specific to military forces and common law courts could not apply military rules. However, prior to the Petition of Right, and especially during the reign of the Tudors and Stuarts, the Crown would apply articles of war (which defined the military law) against civilians in Britain in trials administered by courts-martial (an exercise of martial law). The capricious use of harsh military law by the crown against civilians included the imposition of the death penalty. The practice of enforcing military law against civilians and the usurpation of common-law courts' authority by courts-martial caused an outcry. The lack of a distinction between military law and martial law caused English legal minds to attack the exercise of military law during peacetime. William Blackstone complained,

For martial law, which is built upon no settled principles, but is entirely arbitrary in its decisions, is, as Sir Matthew Hale observes, in truth and reality no law, but something indulged rather than allowed as a law. The necessity of order and discipline in an army is the only thing which can give it countenance; and therefore it ought not to be permitted in time of peace, when the king’s courts are open for all persons to receive justice according to the laws of the land.

This abuse of the crown's prerogative (the crown's right to make and enforce rules for the military) caused Parliament to pass the Petition of Right in 1628. This act stated that neither civilians nor soldiers and officers who were in England during peace were subject to military courts or law. Only common-law courts and courts of equity could exercise authority over individuals in peacetime England. Because the articles of war did not fall under these courts' jurisdiction, military law could not be applied to anyone in England, whether soldier or civilian.

== Passage of the first Mutiny Act ==
Mutiny Act 1688
- Act of Parliament
- Parliament of England
- Long title: An Act for punishing Officers or Soldiers who shall Mutiny or Desert Their Majestyes Service.
- Citation: 1 Will. & Mar. c. 5 (Note: This is the citation in The Statutes of the Realm.); 1 Will. & Mar. Sess. 1. c. 5 (Note: This is the citation in The Statutes at Large.)
- Territorial extent: England and Wales

Dates
- Royal assent: 3 April 1689
- Commencement: 12 April 1689 (Note: Section 2.)
- Expired: 10 November 1689 (Note: Section 1.)
- Repealed: 15 July 1867
Other legislation
Repealed by	Statute Law Revision Act 1867
Relates to	Mutiny Act 1690

Status: Repealed

Text of statute as originally enacted

Mutiny Act 1690
- Act of Parliament
- Parliament of England
- Long title: An Act for Punishing Officers and Soldiers who shall mutiny or desert their Majestyes Service and for punishing false Musters.
- Citation: 2 Will. & Mar. Sess. 2. c. 6
- Territorial extent: England and Wales

Dates
- Royal assent: 20 December 1690
- Commencement: 20 December 1690
- Expired: 20 December 1691
- Repealed: 15 July 1867
Other legislation
Repealed by	Statute Law Revision Act 1867
Relates to	Mutiny Act 1688

Status: Repealed

Text of statute as originally enacted

Mutiny Act 1692
- Act of Parliament
- Parliament of England
- Long title: An Act for punishing Officers and Soldiers who shall mutiny or desert Their Majesties Service and for punishing False Musters and for the payment of Quarters.
- Citation: 4 Will. & Mar. c. 13
- Territorial extent: England and Wales

Dates
- Royal assent: 14 March 1693
- Commencement: 10 March 1692
- Expired: 1 March 1693
- Repealed: 15 July 1867
Other legislation
Amended by	Mutiny Act 1694; Mutiny (No. 2) Act 1694
Repealed by	Statute Law Revision Act 1867
Relates to	Mutiny Act 1688; Mutiny Act 1690

Status: Repealed

Text of statute as originally enacted

King William III replaced King James II in 1688 during the Glorious Revolution.

The Royal Scots was the only unit in which the majority of personnel remained loyal to James II, whom they held to still be the true monarch. The regiment's Commanding Officer, Colonel George Douglas, 1st Earl of Dumbarton, followed James II into exile and one of William's subordinates, Frederick Schomberg, was appointed Colonel. While awaiting transport from Ipswich to Flanders, the regiment mutinied on 15 March 1689 and marched home (the Kingdom of Scotland still being strictly an independent country), refusing to obey orders from William III to fight in Holland. The mutinous troops were located in England during peacetime so only common law and courts of equity had authority over them. However, these courts' power did not include the ability to enforce penalties against mutiny (which was a military law crime and not a common law crime). Therefore, no legal action could be taken to stop or punish the troops.

Parliament responded by passing the Mutiny Act 1688 (1 Will. & Mar. c. 5). This act made desertion, mutiny, and sedition of officers and soldiers crimes triable by court-martial in peacetime England and made such crimes punishable by death. The passage of this act initiated the codification of military law in Great Britain.

Payment for quartering the troops was first included in the Mutiny Act 1692 (4 Will. & Mar. c. 13).

== Renewal of the Mutiny Acts ==
Mutiny Act 1694
- Act of Parliament
- Parliament of England
- Long title: An Act for continuing the Act for punishing Officers and Souldiers who shall mutiny or desert their Majesties. Service and for punishing false Musters and for the Payment of Quarters for One Yeare longer.
- Citation: 5 Will. & Mar. c. 15
- Territorial extent: England and Wales

Dates
- Royal assent: 16 April 1694
- Commencement: 1 March 1694
- Expired: 1 March 1695
- Repealed: 15 July 1867
Other legislation
Amends	Mutiny Act 1692
Amended by	Mutiny (No. 2) Act 1694
Repealed by	Statute Law Revision Act 1867

Status: Repealed

Text of statute as originally enacted

Mutiny (No. 2) Act 1694
- Act of Parliament
- Parliament of England
- Long title: An Act for continuing Two former Acts for punishing Officers and Soldiers who shall mutiny or desert his Majesties service & for punishing false musters and for payment of quarters for one yeare longer.
- Citation: 6 & 7 Will. & Mar. c. 8
- Territorial extent: England and Wales

Dates
- Royal assent: 22 April 1695
- Commencement: 10 April 1965
- Expired: 10 April 1966
- Repealed: 15 July 1867
Other legislation
Amends	Mutiny Act 1692; Mutiny Act 1694
Repealed by	Statute Law Revision Act 1867

Status: Repealed

Text of statute as originally enacted

Mutiny Act 1702
- Act of Parliament
- Parliament of England
- Long title: An Act for punishing Officers and Soldiers who shall mutiny, or desert Her Majesty's Service, in England or Ireland; and for punishing false Musters; and for better Payment of Quarters in England.
- Citation: 1 Ann. St. 2. c. 20; 1 Ann. St. 2. c. 16
- Territorial extent: England and Wales

Dates
- Royal assent: 27 February 1703
- Commencement: 24 March 1703
- Expired: 24 March 1703
- Repealed: 15 July 1867
Other legislation
Repealed by	Statute Law Revision Act 1867

Status: Repealed

Text of statute as originally enacted

Because the Bill of Rights, while prohibiting the existence of a standing army during peacetime without the consent of Parliament, did not prohibit the same in time of war, the Mutiny Act was expressly limited to one year's duration, so that, in either case, war or peace, military discipline could not be enforced, thereby making a standing army impossible for the Crown to maintain. As a result, Parliament annually passed a new Mutiny Act. The Articles of War, published by the Crown, continued to govern military forces outside colonies overseas while the Mutiny Acts imposed military law on military forces in peacetime England. Many other changes occurred during this transition from absolute monarchy to constitutional monarchy, which were "products of the exigencies and opportunities of the quarter century of warfare on the grand scale that commenced with the accession of William and Mary, when England, and then Britain, was able 'to set out such Fleets and Armies as were never heard of among our Ancestors.'"

A new Mutiny Act was passed each year until 1879. The Mutiny Act was modified early on to allow courts-martial for other military crimes besides mutiny, sedition, and desertion. Modifications to the Mutiny Act allowed courts-martial trial of soldiers for acts prohibited by the Crown's articles of war, as long as the articles conformed to the Mutiny Act 1718. Civilians who were closely associated to the military, such as victuallers, could also be tried by courts-martial.

In 1807 all serving black soldiers recruited as slaves in the West India Regiments of the British Army were freed under that year's Mutiny Act.

== The Quartering Acts ==
The Mutiny Acts 1765 and 1774 are better known as Quartering Acts because of the changes which added quartering requirements for British troops in the American Colonies, beyond what the Army had provided.

== List ==
=== England ===
- The Mutiny Act 1703 (2 & 3 Ann. c. 20)

=== Great Britain ===
Mutiny Act 1720
- Act of Parliament
- Parliament of Great Britain
- Long title: An Act for punishing mutiny and desertion, and for the better payment of the army and their quarters.
- Citation: 7 Geo. 1. St. 1. c. 6
- Territorial extent: Great Britain

Dates
- Royal assent: 23 March 1721
- Commencement: 8 December 1720 (Note: Start of session.)
- Repealed: 15 July 1867
Other legislation
Repealed by	Statute Law Revision Act 1867

Status: Repealed

Text of statute as originally enacted

- The Mutiny Act 1720 (7 Geo. 1. St. 1. c. 6)
- The Mutiny Act 1727 (1 Geo. 2. St. 2. c. 2)
- The Mutiny Act 1731 (5 Geo. 2. c. 2)
- The Mutiny Act 1744 (18 Geo. 2. c. 7)
- The Mutiny Act 1753 (26 Geo. 2. c. 5)
- The Mutiny Act 1755 (28 Geo. 2. c. 4)
- The Mutiny Act 1756 (29 Geo. 2. c. 3)

- The Mutiny Act 1759 (33 Geo. 2. c. 6)

- The Mutiny Act 1760 (1 Geo. 3. c. 6)

- The Mutiny Act 1761 (2 Geo. 3. c. 11)

- The Mutiny Act 1762 (3 Geo. 3. c. 7)
- The Mutiny Act 1763 (4 Geo. 3. c. 3)
- The Mutiny Act 1778 (18 Geo. 3. c. 4)
- The Mutiny Act 1786 (26 Geo. 3. c. 10)
- The Mutiny Act 1793 (33 Geo. 3. c. 9)
- The Mutiny Act 1800 (39 & 40 Geo. 3. c. 27)

=== United Kingdom ===
==== 1800s ====
Mutiny Act 1801
- Act of Parliament
- Parliament of the United Kingdom
- Long title: An act for punishing mutiny and desertion; and for the better payment of the army and their quarters.
- Citation: 41 Geo. 3. (U.K.) c. 11
- Territorial extent: United Kingdom

Dates
- Royal assent: 24 March 1801
- Commencement: 24 March 1801 (Note: The Acts of Parliament (Commencement) Act 1793.)
- Repealed: 6 August 1872
Other legislation
Repealed by	Statute Law Revision Act 1872

Status: Repealed

Text of statute as originally enacted

- The Mutiny Act 1801 (41 Geo. 3. (U.K.) c. 11)
- The Mutiny Act 1802 (42 Geo. 3. c. 25)
- The Mutiny (No. 2) Act 1802 (42 Geo. 3. c. 50)
- The Mutiny (No. 3) Act 1802 (42 Geo. 3. c. 88)

Mutiny Act 1803
- Act of Parliament
- Parliament of the United Kingdom
- Long title: An act for punishing Mutiny and Desertion; and for the better Payment of the Army and their Quarters.
- Citation: 43 Geo. 3. c. 20
- Territorial extent: United Kingdom

Dates
- Royal assent: 24 March 1803
- Commencement: 24 March 1803
- Repealed: 6 August 1872
Other legislation
Repealed by	Statute Law Revision Act 1872

Status: Repealed

Text of statute as originally enacted

- The Mutiny Act 1803 (43 Geo. 3. c. 20)

Mutiny Act 1804
- Act of Parliament
- Parliament of the United Kingdom
- Long title: An act for punishing mutiny and desertion; and for the better payment of the army and their quarters.
- Citation: 44 Geo. 3. c. 19
- Territorial extent: United Kingdom

Dates
- Royal assent: 9 March 1804
- Commencement: 9 March 1804
- Repealed: 6 August 1872
Other legislation
Repealed by	Statute Law Revision Act 1872

Status: Repealed

Text of statute as originally enacted

- The Mutiny Act 1804 (44 Geo. 3. c. 19)

Mutiny Act 1805
- Act of Parliament
- Parliament of the United Kingdom
- Long title: An act for punishing mutiny and desertion; and for the better payment of the army and their quarters.
- Citation: 45 Geo. 3. c. 16
- Territorial extent: United Kingdom

Dates
- Royal assent: 18 March 1805
- Commencement: 18 March 1805
- Repealed: 6 August 1872
Other legislation
Repealed by	Statute Law Revision Act 1872

Status: Repealed

Text of statute as originally enacted

- The Mutiny Act 1805 (45 Geo. 3. c. 16)
- The Mutiny Act 1806 (46 Geo. 3. c. 15)
- The Mutiny (No. 2) Act 1806 (46 Geo. 3. c. 48)
- The Mutiny (No. 3) Act 1806 (46 Geo. 3. c. 66)
- The Mutiny Act 1807 (47 Geo. 3 Sess. 1. c. 32)

Mutiny Act 1808
- Act of Parliament
- Parliament of the United Kingdom
- Long title: An Act for punishing Mutiny and Desertion; and for the better Payment of the Army and their Quarters.
- Citation: 48 Geo. 3. c. 15
- Territorial extent: United Kingdom

Dates
- Royal assent: 21 March 1808
- Commencement: 21 March 1808
- Repealed: 10 August 1872
Other legislation
Repealed by	Statute Law Revision Act 1872 (No. 2)

Status: Repealed

Text of statute as originally enacted

- The Mutiny Act 1808 (48 Geo. 3. c. 15)

- The Mutiny Act 1809 (49 Geo. 3. c. 12)

==== 1810s ====
Mutiny Act 1810
- Act of Parliament
- Parliament of the United Kingdom
- Long title: An act for punishing Mutiny and Desertion; and for the better Payment of the Army and their Quarters.
- Citation: 50 Geo. 3. c. 7
- Territorial extent: United Kingdom

Dates
- Royal assent: 21 March 1810
- Commencement: 21 March 1810
- Repealed: 10 August 1872
Other legislation
Repealed by	Statute Law Revision Act 1872 (No. 2)

Status: Repealed

Text of statute as originally enacted

- The Mutiny Act 1810 (50 Geo. 3. c. 7)

Mutiny Act 1811
- Act of Parliament
- Parliament of the United Kingdom
- Long title: An Act for punishing Mutiny and Desertion; and for the better Payment of the Army and their Quarters.
- Citation: 51 Geo. 3. c. 8
- Territorial extent: United Kingdom

Dates
- Royal assent: 22 March 1811
- Commencement: 22 March 1811
- Repealed: 5 August 1873
Other legislation
Repealed by	Statute Law Revision Act 1873

Status: Repealed

Text of statute as originally enacted

- The Mutiny Act 1811 (51 Geo. 3. c. 8)

Mutiny Act 1812
- Act of Parliament
- Parliament of the United Kingdom
- Long title: An Act for punishing Mutiny and Desertion; and for the better Payment of the Army and their Quarters.
- Citation: 52 Geo. 3. c. 22
- Territorial extent: United Kingdom

Dates
- Royal assent: 20 March 1812
- Commencement: 20 March 1812
- Repealed: 5 August 1873
Other legislation
Repealed by	Statute Law Revision Act 1873

Status: Repealed

Text of statute as originally enacted

- The Mutiny Act 1812 (52 Geo. 3. c. 22)

Mutiny Act 1815
- Act of Parliament
- Parliament of the United Kingdom
- Long title: An act for punishing Mutiny and Desertion; and for the better Payment of the Army and their Quarters.
- Citation: 55 Geo. 3. c. 108
- Territorial extent: United Kingdom

Dates
- Royal assent: 22 June 1815
- Commencement: 22 June 1815
- Repealed: 5 August 1873
Other legislation
Repealed by	Statute Law Revision Act 1873

Status: Repealed

Text of statute as originally enacted

- The Mutiny Act 1815 (55 Geo. 3. c. 108)

Mutiny Act 1816
- Act of Parliament
- Parliament of the United Kingdom
- Long title: An Act for punishing Mutiny and Desertion; and for the better Payment of the Army and their Quarters.
- Citation: 56 Geo. 3. c. 10
- Territorial extent: United Kingdom

Dates
- Royal assent: 22 March 1816
- Commencement: 22 March 1816
- Repealed: 5 August 1873
Other legislation
Repealed by	Statute Law Revision Act 1873

Status: Repealed

Text of statute as originally enacted

- The Mutiny Act 1816 (56 Geo. 3. c. 10)

Mutiny Act 1817
- Act of Parliament
- Parliament of the United Kingdom
- Long title: An Act for punishing Mutiny and Desertion; and for the better Payment of the Army and their Quarters.
- Citation: 57 Geo. 3. c. 12
- Territorial extent: United Kingdom

Dates
- Royal assent: 21 March 1817
- Commencement: 21 March 1817
- Repealed: 5 August 1873
Other legislation
Repealed by	Statute Law Revision Act 1873

Status: Repealed

Text of statute as originally enacted

- The Mutiny Act 1817 (57 Geo. 3. c. 35)

Mutiny Act 1819
- Act of Parliament
- Parliament of the United Kingdom
- Long title: An Act for punishing Mutiny and Desertion; and for the better Payment of the Army, and their Quarters.
- Citation: 59 Geo. 3. c. 9
- Territorial extent: United Kingdom

Dates
- Royal assent: 23 March 1819
- Commencement: 23 March 1819
- Repealed: 5 August 1873
Other legislation
Repealed by	Statute Law Revision Act 1873

Status: Repealed

Text of statute as originally enacted

- The Mutiny Act 1819 (59 Geo. 3. c. 9)

==== 1820s ====
Mutiny Act 1822
- Act of Parliament
- Parliament of the United Kingdom
- Long title: An Act for punishing Mutiny and Desertion; and for the better Payment of the Army and their Quarters.
- Citation: 3 Geo. 4. c. 13
- Territorial extent: United Kingdom

Dates
- Royal assent: 21 March 1822
- Commencement: 21 March 1822
- Repealed: 5 August 1873
Other legislation
Repealed by	Statute Law Revision Act 1873

Status: Repealed

Text of statute as originally enacted

- The Mutiny Act 1822 (3 Geo. 4. c. 13)

Mutiny Act 1829
- Act of Parliament
- Parliament of the United Kingdom
- Long title: An Act for punishing Mutiny and Desertion; and for the better Payment of the Army and their Quarters.
- Citation: 10 Geo. 4. c. 6
- Territorial extent: United Kingdom

Dates
- Royal assent: 23 March 1829
- Commencement: 23 March 1829
- Repealed: 5 August 1873
Other legislation
Repealed by	Statute Law Revision Act 1873

Status: Repealed

Text of statute as originally enacted

- The Mutiny Act 1829 (10 Geo. 4. c. 6)

==== 1830s ====
Mutiny Act 1830
- Act of Parliament
- Parliament of the United Kingdom
- Long title: An Act for punishing Mutiny and Desertion; and for the better Payment of the Army and their Quarters.
- Citation: 11 Geo. 4 & 1 Will. 4. c. 7
- Territorial extent: United Kingdom

Dates
- Royal assent: 23 March 1830
- Commencement: 23 March 1830
- Repealed: 5 August 1873
Other legislation
Repealed by	Statute Law Revision Act 1873

Status: Repealed

Text of statute as originally enacted

- The Mutiny Act 1830 (11 Geo. 4 & 1 Will. 4. c. 7)

Mutiny Act 1832
- Act of Parliament
- Parliament of the United Kingdom
- Long title: An Act for punishing Mutiny and Desertion; and for the better Payment of the Army and their Quarters.
- Citation: 2 & 3 Will. 4. c. 28
- Territorial extent: United Kingdom

Dates
- Royal assent: 9 April 1832
- Commencement: 9 April 1832
- Repealed: 16 July 1874
Other legislation
Repealed by	Statute Law Revision Act 1874

Status: Repealed

Text of statute as originally enacted

- The Mutiny Act 1832 (2 & 3 Will. 4. c. 28)

Mutiny Act 1839
- Act of Parliament
- Parliament of the United Kingdom
- Long title: An Act for punishing Mutiny and Desertion, and for the better Payment of the Army and their Quarters.
- Citation: 2 & 3 Vict. c. 5
- Territorial extent: United Kingdom

Dates
- Royal assent: 19 April 1839
- Commencement: 19 April 1839
- Repealed: 7 August 1874
Other legislation
Repealed by	Statute Law Revision Act 1874 (No. 2)

Status: Repealed

Text of statute as originally enacted

- The Mutiny Act 1839 (2 & 3 Vict. c. 5)

==== 1840s ====
Mutiny Act 1841
- Act of Parliament
- Parliament of the United Kingdom
- Long title: An Act for punishing Mutiny and Desertion, and for the better Payment of the Army and their Quarters.
- Citation: 4 & 5 Vict. c. 2
- Territorial extent: United Kingdom

Dates
- Royal assent: 30 March 1841
- Commencement: 30 March 1841
- Repealed: 7 August 1874
Other legislation
Repealed by	Statute Law Revision Act 1874 (No. 2)

Status: Repealed

Text of statute as originally enacted

- The Mutiny Act 1841 (4 & 5 Vict. c. 2)

Mutiny Act 1842
- Act of Parliament
- Parliament of the United Kingdom
- Long title: An Act for punishing Mutiny and Desertion, and for the better Payment of the Army and their Quarters.
- Citation: 5 & 6 Vict. c. 12
- Territorial extent: United Kingdom

Dates
- Royal assent: 22 April 1842
- Commencement: 22 April 1842
- Repealed: 7 August 1874
Other legislation
Repealed by	Statute Law Revision Act 1874 (No. 2)

Status: Repealed

Text of statute as originally enacted

- The Mutiny Act 1842 (5 & 6 Vict. c. 12)

Mutiny Act 1843
- Act of Parliament
- Parliament of the United Kingdom
- Long title: An Act for punishing Mutiny and Desertion, and for the better Payment of the Army and their Quarters.
- Citation: 6 & 7 Vict. c. 3
- Territorial extent: United Kingdom

Dates
- Royal assent: 3 April 1843
- Commencement: 3 April 1843
- Repealed: 7 August 1874
Other legislation
Amended by	Millbank Prison Act 1843
Repealed by	Statute Law Revision Act 1874 (No. 2)

Status: Repealed

Text of statute as originally enacted

- The Mutiny Act 1843 (6 & 7 Vict. c. 3)

Mutiny Act 1846
- Act of Parliament
- Parliament of the United Kingdom
- Long title: An Act for punishing Mutiny and Desertion, and for the better Payment of the Army and their Quarters.
- Citation: 9 & 10 Vict. c. 11
- Territorial extent: United Kingdom

Dates
- Royal assent: 2 April 1846
- Commencement: 2 April 1846
- Repealed: 11 August 1875
Other legislation
Repealed by	Statute Law Revision Act 1875

Status: Repealed

Text of statute as originally enacted

- The Mutiny Act 1846 (9 & 10 Vict. c. 11)

Mutiny Act 1847
- Act of Parliament
- Parliament of the United Kingdom
- Long title: An Act for punishing Mutiny and Desertion, and for the better Payment of the Army and their Quarters.
- Citation: 10 & 11 Vict. c. 12
- Territorial extent: United Kingdom

Dates
- Royal assent: 23 April 1847
- Commencement: 23 April 1847
- Repealed: 11 August 1875
Other legislation
Repealed by	Statute Law Revision Act 1875

Status: Repealed

Text of statute as originally enacted

- The Mutiny Act 1847 (10 & 11 Vict. c. 12)

Mutiny Act 1848
- Act of Parliament
- Parliament of the United Kingdom
- Long title: An Act for punishing Mutiny and Desertion, and for the better Payment of the Army and their Quarters.
- Citation: 11 & 12 Vict. c. 11
- Territorial extent: United Kingdom

Dates
- Royal assent: 22 April 1848
- Commencement: 22 April 1848
- Repealed: 11 August 1875
Other legislation
Repealed by	Statute Law Revision Act 1875

Status: Repealed

Text of statute as originally enacted

- The Mutiny Act 1848 (11 & 12 Vict. c. 11)

Mutiny Act 1849
- Act of Parliament
- Parliament of the United Kingdom
- Long title: An Act for punishing Mutiny and Desertion, and for the better Payment of the Army and their Quarters.
- Citation: 12 & 13 Vict. c. 10
- Territorial extent: United Kingdom

Dates
- Royal assent: 3 April 1849
- Commencement: 3 April 1849
- Repealed: 11 August 1875
Other legislation
Repealed by	Statute Law Revision Act 1875

Status: Repealed

Text of statute as originally enacted

- The Mutiny Act 1849 (12 & 13 Vict. c. 10)

==== 1850s ====
Mutiny Act 1850
- Act of Parliament
- Parliament of the United Kingdom
- Long title: An Act for punishing Mutiny and Desertion, and for the better Payment of the Army and their Quarters.
- Citation: 13 & 14 Vict. c. 5
- Territorial extent: United Kingdom

Dates
- Royal assent: 25 March 1850
- Commencement: 25 March 1850
- Repealed: 11 August 1875
Other legislation
Repealed by	Statute Law Revision Act 1875

Status: Repealed

Text of statute as originally enacted

- The Mutiny Act 1850 (13 & 14 Vict. c. 5)

Mutiny Act 1851
- Act of Parliament
- Parliament of the United Kingdom
- Long title: An Act for punishing Mutiny and Desertion, and for the better Payment of the Army and their Quarters.
- Citation: 14 & 15 Vict. c. 6
- Territorial extent: United Kingdom

Dates
- Royal assent: 11 April 1851
- Commencement: 11 April 1851
- Repealed: 11 August 1875
Other legislation
Repealed by	Statute Law Revision Act 1875

Status: Repealed

Text of statute as originally enacted

- The Mutiny Act 1851 (14 & 15 Vict. c. 6)

Mutiny Act 1852
- Act of Parliament
- Parliament of the United Kingdom
- Long title: An Act for punishing Mutiny and Desertion, and for the better Payment of the Army and their Quarters.
- Citation: 15 & 16 Vict. c. 7
- Territorial extent: United Kingdom

Dates
- Royal assent: 20 April 1852
- Commencement: 20 April 1852
- Repealed: 11 August 1875
Other legislation
Repealed by	Statute Law Revision Act 1875

Status: Repealed

Text of statute as originally enacted

- The Mutiny Act 1852 (15 & 16 Vict. c. 7)

Mutiny Act 1853
- Act of Parliament
- Parliament of the United Kingdom
- Long title: An Act for punishing Mutiny and Desertion, and for the better Payment of the Army and their Quarters.
- Citation: 16 & 17 Vict. c. 9
- Territorial extent: United Kingdom

Dates
- Royal assent: 18 March 1853
- Commencement: 18 March 1853
- Repealed: 11 August 1875
Other legislation
Repealed by	Statute Law Revision Act 1875

Status: Repealed

Text of statute as originally enacted

- The Mutiny Act 1853 (16 & 17 Vict. c. 9)

Mutiny Act 1854
- Act of Parliament
- Parliament of the United Kingdom
- Long title: An Act for punishing Mutiny and Desertion, and for the better Payment of the Army and their Quarters.
- Citation: 17 & 18 Vict. c. 4
- Territorial extent: United Kingdom

Dates
- Royal assent: 23 March 1854
- Commencement: 23 March 1854
- Repealed: 11 August 1875
Other legislation
Repealed by	Statute Law Revision Act 1875

Status: Repealed

Text of statute as originally enacted

- The Mutiny Act 1854 (17 & 18 Vict. c. 4)

Mutiny Act 1855
- Act of Parliament
- Parliament of the United Kingdom
- Long title: An Act for punishing Mutiny and Desertion, and for the better Payment of the Army and their Quarters.
- Citation: 18 & 19 Vict. c. 11
- Territorial extent: United Kingdom

Dates
- Royal assent: 16 March 1855
- Commencement: 16 March 1855
- Repealed: 11 August 1875
Other legislation
Repealed by	Statute Law Revision Act 1875

Status: Repealed

Text of statute as originally enacted

- The Mutiny Act 1855 (18 & 19 Vict. c. 11)

Mutiny Act 1856
- Act of Parliament
- Parliament of the United Kingdom
- Long title: An Act for punishing Mutiny and Desertion, and for the better Payment of the Army and their Quarters.
- Citation: 19 & 20 Vict. c. 10
- Territorial extent: United Kingdom

Dates
- Royal assent: 14 March 1856
- Commencement: 14 March 1856
- Repealed: 11 August 1875
Other legislation
Repealed by	Statute Law Revision Act 1875

Status: Repealed

Text of statute as originally enacted

- The Mutiny Act 1856 (19 & 20 Vict. c. 10)

Mutiny Act 1857
- Act of Parliament
- Parliament of the United Kingdom
- Long title: An Act for punishing Mutiny and Desertion, and for the better Payment of the Army and their Quarters.
- Citation: 20 Vict. c. 13
- Territorial extent: United Kingdom

Dates
- Royal assent: 21 March 1857
- Commencement: 21 March 1857
- Repealed: 11 August 1875
Other legislation
Repealed by	Statute Law Revision Act 1875

Status: Repealed

Text of statute as originally enacted

- The Mutiny Act 1857 (20 Vict. c. 13)

Mutiny Act 1858
- Act of Parliament
- Parliament of the United Kingdom
- Long title: An Act for punishing Mutiny and Desertion, and for the better Payment of the Army and their Quarters.
- Citation: 21 & 22 Vict. c. 9
- Territorial extent: United Kingdom

Dates
- Royal assent: 26 March 1858
- Commencement: 26 March 1858
- Repealed: 11 August 1875
Other legislation
Repealed by	Statute Law Revision Act 1875

Status: Repealed

Text of statute as originally enacted

- The Mutiny Act 1858 (21 & 22 Vict. c. 9)

Mutiny Act 1859
- Act of Parliament
- Parliament of the United Kingdom
- Long title: An Act for punishing Mutiny and Desertion, and for the better Payment of the Army and their Quarters.
- Citation: 22 Vict. c. 4
- Territorial extent: United Kingdom

Dates
- Royal assent: 25 March 1859
- Commencement: 25 March 1859
- Repealed: 11 August 1875
Other legislation
Repealed by	Statute Law Revision Act 1875

Status: Repealed

Text of statute as originally enacted

- The Mutiny Act 1859 (22 Vict. c. 4)

==== 1860s ====
Mutiny Act 1860
- Act of Parliament
- Parliament of the United Kingdom
- Long title: An Act for punishing Mutiny and Desertion and for the better Payment of the Army and their Quarters.
- Citation: 23 & 24 Vict. c. 9
- Territorial extent: United Kingdom

Dates
- Royal assent: 31 March 1860
- Commencement: 31 March 1860
- Repealed: 11 August 1875
Other legislation
Repealed by	Statute Law Revision Act 1875

Status: Repealed

Text of statute as originally enacted

- The Mutiny Act 1860 (23 & 24 Vict. c. 9)

Mutiny Act 1861
- Act of Parliament
- Parliament of the United Kingdom
- Long title: An Act for punishing Mutiny and Desertion, and for the better Payment of the Army and their Quarters.
- Citation: 24 & 25 Vict. c. 7
- Territorial extent: United Kingdom

Dates
- Royal assent: 18 April 1861
- Commencement: 18 April 1861
- Repealed: 11 August 1875
Other legislation
Repealed by	Statute Law Revision Act 1875

Status: Repealed

Text of statute as originally enacted

- The Mutiny Act 1861 (24 & 25 Vict. c. 7)

Mutiny Act 1862
- Act of Parliament
- Parliament of the United Kingdom
- Long title: An Act for punishing Mutiny and Desertion, and for the better Payment of the Army and their Quarters.
- Citation: 25 & 26 Vict. c. 5
- Territorial extent: United Kingdom

Dates
- Royal assent: 11 April 1862
- Commencement: 11 April 1862
- Repealed: 11 August 1875
Other legislation
Repealed by	Statute Law Revision Act 1875

Status: Repealed

Text of statute as originally enacted

- The Mutiny Act 1862 (25 & 26 Vict. c. 5)

Mutiny Act 1863
- Act of Parliament
- Parliament of the United Kingdom
- Long title: An Act for punishing Mutiny and Desertion, and for the better Payment of the Army and their Quarters.
- Citation: 26 & 27 Vict. c. 8
- Territorial extent: United Kingdom (Note: Section 105.)

Dates
- Royal assent: 20 April 1863
- Commencement: 25 April 1863
- Expired: Great Britain: 25 April 1863
- Repealed: 11 August 1875
Other legislation
Amended by	Regimental Debts Act 1863
Repealed by	Statute Law Revision Act 1875

Status: Repealed

Text of statute as originally enacted

- The Mutiny Act 1863 (26 & 27 Vict. c. 8)

Mutiny Act 1864
- Act of Parliament
- Parliament of the United Kingdom
- Long title: An Act for the Regulation of Her Majesty's Royal Marine Forces while on shore.
- Citation: 27 & 28 Vict. c. 3
- Territorial extent: United Kingdom

Dates
- Royal assent: 18 March 1864
- Commencement: 18 March 1864
- Repealed: 11 August 1875
Other legislation
Repealed by	Statute Law Revision Act 1875

Status: Repealed

Text of statute as originally enacted

- The Mutiny Act 1864 (27 & 28 Vict. c. 3)

Mutiny Act 1865
- Act of Parliament
- Parliament of the United Kingdom
- Long title: An Act for punishing Mutiny and Desertion, and for the better Payment of the Army and their Quarters.
- Citation: 28 & 29 Vict. c. 11
- Territorial extent: United Kingdom

Dates
- Royal assent: 7 April 1865
- Commencement: 7 April 1865
- Repealed: 11 August 1875
Other legislation
Repealed by	Statute Law Revision Act 1875

Status: Repealed

Text of statute as originally enacted

- The Mutiny Act 1865 (28 & 29 Vict. c. 11)

Mutiny Act 1866
- Act of Parliament
- Parliament of the United Kingdom
- Long title: An Act for punishing Mutiny and Desertion, and for the better Payment of the Army and their Quarters.
- Citation: 29 & 30 Vict. c. 9
- Territorial extent: United Kingdom

Dates
- Royal assent: 23 March 1866
- Commencement: 23 March 1866
- Repealed: 11 August 1875
Other legislation
Repealed by	Statute Law Revision Act 1875

Status: Repealed

Text of statute as originally enacted

- The Mutiny Act 1866 (29 & 30 Vict. c. 9)

Mutiny Act 1867
- Act of Parliament
- Parliament of the United Kingdom
- Long title: An Act for punishing Mutiny and Desertion, and for the better Payment of the Army and their Quarters.
- Citation: 30 & 31 Vict. c. 13
- Territorial extent: United Kingdom

Dates
- Royal assent: 12 April 1867
- Commencement: 12 April 1867
- Repealed: 11 August 1875
Other legislation
Repealed by	Statute Law Revision Act 1875

Status: Repealed

Text of statute as originally enacted

- The Mutiny Act 1867 (30 & 31 Vict. c. 13)

Mutiny Act 1868
- Act of Parliament
- Parliament of the United Kingdom
- Long title: An Act for punishing Mutiny and Desertion, and for the better Payment of the Army and their Quarters.
- Citation: 31 & 32 Vict. c. 14
- Territorial extent: United Kingdom

Dates
- Royal assent: 3 April 1868
- Commencement: 3 April 1868
- Repealed: 11 August 1875
Other legislation
Repealed by	Statute Law Revision Act 1875

Status: Repealed

Text of statute as originally enacted

- The Mutiny Act 1868 (31 & 32 Vict. c. 14)

Mutiny Act 1869
- Act of Parliament
- Parliament of the United Kingdom
- Long title: An Act for punishing Mutiny and Desertion, and for the better payment of the Army and their Quarters.
- Citation: 32 & 33 Vict. c. 4
- Territorial extent: United Kingdom

Dates
- Royal assent: 19 April 1869
- Commencement: 19 April 1869
- Repealed: 25 August 1883
Other legislation
Repealed by	Statute Law Revision Act 1883

Status: Repealed

Text of statute as originally enacted

- The Mutiny Act 1869 (32 & 33 Vict. c. 4)

==== 1870s ====
Mutiny Act 1870
- Act of Parliament
- Parliament of the United Kingdom
- Long title: An Act for punishing Mutiny and Desertion, and for the better payment of the Army and their Quarters.
- Citation: 33 & 34 Vict. c. 7
- Territorial extent: United Kingdom

Dates
- Royal assent: 4 April 1870
- Commencement: 4 April 1870
- Repealed: 25 August 1883
Other legislation
Repealed by	Statute Law Revision Act 1883

Status: Repealed

Text of statute as originally enacted

- The Mutiny Act 1870 (33 & 34 Vict. c. 7)

Mutiny Act 1871
- Act of Parliament
- Parliament of the United Kingdom
- Long title: An Act for punishing Mutiny and Desertion, and for the better payment of the Army and their Quarters.
- Citation: 34 & 35 Vict. c. 9
- Territorial extent: United Kingdom

Dates
- Royal assent: 24 April 1871
- Commencement: 24 April 1871
- Repealed: 25 August 1883
Other legislation
Repealed by	Statute Law Revision Act 1883

Status: Repealed

Text of statute as originally enacted

- The Mutiny Act 1871 (34 & 35 Vict. c. 9)

Mutiny Act 1872
- Act of Parliament
- Parliament of the United Kingdom
- Long title: An Act for Punishing Mutiny and Desertion, and for the better payment of the Army and their Quarters.
- Citation: 35 & 36 Vict. c. 3
- Territorial extent: United Kingdom

Dates
- Royal assent: 23 April 1872
- Commencement: 23 April 1872
- Repealed: 25 August 1883
Other legislation
Repealed by	Statute Law Revision Act 1883

Status: Repealed

Text of statute as originally enacted

- The Mutiny Act 1872 (35 & 36 Vict. c. 3)

- The Mutiny Act 1873 (36 & 37 Vict. c. 10)

Mutiny Act 1874
- Act of Parliament
- Parliament of the United Kingdom
- Long title: An Act for punishing Mutiny and Desertion, and for the better payment of the Army and their Quarters.
- Citation: 37 & 38 Vict. c. 4
- Territorial extent: United Kingdom

Dates
- Royal assent: 24 April 1874
- Commencement: 24 April 1874
- Repealed: 25 August 1883
Other legislation
Repealed by	Statute Law Revision Act 1883

Status: Repealed

Text of statute as originally enacted

- The Mutiny Act 1874 (37 & 38 Vict. c. 4)

Mutiny Act 1875
- Act of Parliament
- Parliament of the United Kingdom
- Long title: An Act for punishing Mutiny and Desertion, and for the better payment of the Army and their Quarters.
- Citation: 38 & 39 Vict. c. 7
- Territorial extent: United Kingdom

Dates
- Royal assent: 22 April 1875
- Commencement: 22 April 1875
- Repealed: 25 August 1883
Other legislation
Repealed by	Statute Law Revision Act 1883

Status: Repealed

Text of statute as originally enacted

- The Mutiny Act 1875 (38 & 39 Vict. c. 7)

Mutiny Act 1876
- Act of Parliament
- Parliament of the United Kingdom
- Long title: An Act for punishing Mutiny and Desertion, and for the better payment of the Army and their Quarters.
- Citation: 39 & 40 Vict. c. 8
- Territorial extent: United Kingdom

Dates
- Royal assent: 7 April 1876
- Commencement: 7 April 1876
- Repealed: 25 August 1883
Other legislation
Repealed by	Statute Law Revision Act 1883

Status: Repealed

Text of statute as originally enacted

- The Mutiny Act 1876 (39 & 40 Vict. c. 8)

Mutiny Act 1877
- Act of Parliament
- Parliament of the United Kingdom
- Long title: An Act for punishing Mutiny and Desertion, and for the better payment of the Army and their Quarters.
- Citation: 40 & 41 Vict. c. 7
- Territorial extent: United Kingdom

Dates
- Royal assent: 24 April 1877
- Commencement: 24 April 1877
- Repealed: 25 August 1883
Other legislation
Repealed by	Statute Law Revision Act 1883

Status: Repealed

Text of statute as originally enacted

- The Mutiny Act 1877 (40 & 41 Vict. c. 7)

Mutiny Act 1878
- Act of Parliament
- Parliament of the United Kingdom
- Long title: An Act for punishing Mutiny and Desertion, and for the better payment of the Army and their Quarters.
- Citation: 41 & 42 Vict. c. 10
- Territorial extent: United Kingdom

Dates
- Royal assent: 16 April 1878
- Commencement: 16 April 1878
- Repealed: 25 August 1883
Other legislation
Amended by	Mutiny Act (Temporary) Continuance Act 1879; Regulation of the Forces Act 1881; Reserve Forces Act 1882; Militia Act 1882
Repealed by	Statute Law Revision Act 1883

Status: Repealed

Text of statute as originally enacted

- The Mutiny Act 1878 (41 & 42 Vict. c. 10)

Mutiny Act (Temporary) Continuance Act 1879
- Act of Parliament
- Parliament of the United Kingdom
- Long title: An Act to continue for Three Months the Act of the Session of the forty-first and forty-second years of the reign of Her present Majesty, chapter ten, intituled "An Act for punishing Mutiny and Desertion, and for the better Payment of the Army and their Quarters."
- Citation: 42 & 43 Vict. c. 4
- Territorial extent: United Kingdom

Dates
- Royal assent: 21 March 1879
- Commencement: 21 March 1879
- Repealed: 25 August 1894
Other legislation
Amends	Mutiny Act 1878
Repealed by	Statute Law Revision Act 1894

Status: Repealed

Text of statute as originally enacted

- The Mutiny Act (Temporary) Continuance Act 1879 (42 & 43 Vict. c. 4)

== Marine Mutiny Acts ==
The Marine Mutiny Acts included the following acts of the Parliament of the United Kingdom:

Marine Mutiny Act 1778
- Act of Parliament
- Parliament of Great Britain
- Long title: An Act for the Regulation of His Majesty's Marine Forces while on Shore.
- Citation: 18 Geo. 3. c. 5
- Territorial extent: Great Britain

Dates
- Royal assent: 6 March 1778
- Commencement: 20 November 1777
- Repealed: 21 August 1871
Other legislation
Repealed by	Statute Law Revision Act 1871

Status: Repealed

Text of statute as originally enacted

- The Marine Mutiny Act 1778 (18 Geo. 3. c. 5)

Marine Mutiny Act 1801
- Act of Parliament
- Parliament of the United Kingdom
- Long title: An Act for the regulation of his Majesty's marine forces while on shore, until the twenty-fifth day of March one thousand eight hundred and two.
- Citation: 41 Geo. 3. (U.K.) c. 18
- Territorial extent: United Kingdom

Dates
- Royal assent: 24 March 1801
- Commencement: 25 March 1801
- Expired: 25 March 1802 (Note: Section 46.)
- Repealed: 6 August 1872
Other legislation
Repealed by	Statute Law Revision Act 1872

Status: Repealed

Text of statute as originally enacted

- The Marine Mutiny Act 1801 (41 Geo. 3. (U.K.) c. 18)

Marine Mutiny Act 1802
- Act of Parliament
- Parliament of the United Kingdom
- Long title: An act for the Regulation of his Majesty's Marine Forces while on Shore, until the twenty-fifth Day of May One thousand eight hundred and two.
- Citation: 42 Geo. 3. c. 26
- Territorial extent: United Kingdom

Dates
- Royal assent: 24 March 1802
- Commencement: 24 March 1802
- Repealed: 6 August 1872
Other legislation
Amended by	Marine Mutiny (No. 2) Act 1802
Repealed by	Statute Law Revision Act 1872

Status: Repealed

Text of statute as originally enacted

- The Marine Mutiny Act 1802 (42 Geo. 3. c. 26)

Marine Mutiny (No. 2) Act 1802
- Act of Parliament
- Parliament of the United Kingdom
- Long title: An act for continuing, until the twenty-fifth Day of June One thousand eight hundred and two, an Act made in this Session of Parliament, for the Regulation of his Majesty's Marine Forces while on Shore.
- Citation: 42 Geo. 3. c. 51
- Territorial extent: United Kingdom

Dates
- Royal assent: 24 May 1802
- Commencement: 24 May 1802
- Repealed: 6 August 1872
Other legislation
Amends	Marine Mutiny Act 1802
Repealed by	Statute Law Revision Act 1872

Status: Repealed

Text of statute as originally enacted

- The Marine Mutiny (No. 2) Act 1802 (42 Geo. 3. c. 51)

Marine Mutiny (No. 3) Act 1802
- Act of Parliament
- Parliament of the United Kingdom
- Long title: An act for the Regulation of his Majesty's Royal Marine Forces while on Shore.
- Citation: 42 Geo. 3. c. 115
- Territorial extent: United Kingdom

Dates
- Royal assent: 26 June 1802
- Commencement: 26 June 1802
- Repealed: 6 August 1872
Other legislation
Repealed by	Statute Law Revision Act 1872

Status: Repealed

Text of statute as originally enacted

- The Marine Mutiny (No. 3) Act 1802 (42 Geo. 3. c. 115)

Marine Mutiny Act 1803
- Act of Parliament
- Parliament of the United Kingdom
- Long title: An act for the Regulation of his Majesty's Royal Marine Forces while on Shore.
- Citation: 43 Geo. 3. c. 27
- Territorial extent: United Kingdom

Dates
- Royal assent: 24 March 1803
- Commencement: 24 March 1803
- Repealed: 6 August 1872
Other legislation
Repealed by	Statute Law Revision Act 1872

Status: Repealed

Text of statute as originally enacted

- The Marine Mutiny Act 1803 (43 Geo. 3. c. 27)

Marine Mutiny Act 1804
- Act of Parliament
- Parliament of the United Kingdom
- Long title: An act for the regulation of his Majesty's royal marine forces while on shore.
- Citation: 44 Geo. 3. c. 20
- Territorial extent: United Kingdom

Dates
- Royal assent: 9 March 1804
- Commencement: 9 March 1804
- Repealed: 6 August 1872
Other legislation
Repealed by	Statute Law Revision Act 1872

Status: Repealed

Text of statute as originally enacted

- The Marine Mutiny Act 1804 (44 Geo. 3. c. 20)

Marine Mutiny Act 1840
- Act of Parliament
- Parliament of the United Kingdom
- Long title: An Act for the Regulation of Her Majesty's Royal Marine Forces while on shore.
- Citation: 3 & 4 Vict. c. 8
- Territorial extent: United Kingdom

Dates
- Royal assent: 3 April 1840
- Commencement: 3 April 1840
- Repealed: 7 August 1874
Other legislation
Repealed by	Statute Law Revision Act 1874 (No. 2)

Status: Repealed

Text of statute as originally enacted

- The Marine Mutiny Act 1840 (3 & 4 Vict. c. 8)

Marine Mutiny Act 1842
- Act of Parliament
- Parliament of the United Kingdom
- Long title: An Act for the Regulation of Her Majesty's Royal Marine Forces while on shore.
- Citation: 5 & 6 Vict. c. 13
- Territorial extent: United Kingdom

Dates
- Royal assent: 22 April 1842
- Commencement: 22 April 1842
- Repealed: 7 August 1874
Other legislation
Repealed by	Statute Law Revision Act 1874 (No. 2)

Status: Repealed

Text of statute as originally enacted

- The Marine Mutiny Act 1842 (5 & 6 Vict. c. 13)

Marine Mutiny Act 1860
- Act of Parliament
- Parliament of the United Kingdom
- Long title: An Act for the Regulation of Her Majesty's Royal Marine Forces while on shore.
- Citation: 23 & 24 Vict. c. 10
- Territorial extent: United Kingdom

Dates
- Royal assent: 31 March 1860
- Commencement: 31 March 1860
- Repealed: 11 August 1875
Other legislation
Repealed by	Statute Law Revision Act 1875

Status: Repealed

Text of statute as originally enacted

- The Marine Mutiny Act 1860 (23 & 24 Vict. c. 10)

Marine Mutiny Act 1861
- Act of Parliament
- Parliament of the United Kingdom
- Long title: An Act for the Regulation of Her Majesty's Royal Marine Forces while on shore.
- Citation: 24 & 25 Vict. c. 8
- Territorial extent: United Kingdom

Dates
- Royal assent: 18 April 1861
- Commencement: 18 April 1861
- Repealed: 11 August 1875
Other legislation
Repealed by	Statute Law Revision Act 1875

Status: Repealed

Text of statute as originally enacted

- The Marine Mutiny Act 1861 (24 & 25 Vict. c. 8)

Marine Mutiny Act 1862
- Act of Parliament
- Parliament of the United Kingdom
- Long title: An Act for the Regulation of Her Majesty's Royal Marine Forces while on shore.
- Citation: 25 & 26 Vict. c. 6
- Territorial extent: United Kingdom

Dates
- Royal assent: 11 April 1862
- Commencement: 11 April 1862
- Repealed: 11 August 1875
Other legislation
Repealed by	Statute Law Revision Act 1875

Status: Repealed

Text of statute as originally enacted

- The Marine Mutiny Act (1862) (25 & 26 Vict. c. 6)

Marine Mutiny Act 1863
- Act of Parliament
- Parliament of the United Kingdom
- Long title: An Act for the Regulation of Her Majesty's Royal Marine Forces while on shore.
- Citation: 26 & 27 Vict. c. 9
- Territorial extent: United Kingdom

Dates
- Royal assent: 20 April 1863
- Commencement: 20 April 1863
- Repealed: 11 August 1875
Other legislation
Repealed by	Statute Law Revision Act 1875

Status: Repealed

Text of statute as originally enacted

- The Marine Mutiny Act (1863) (26 & 27 Vict. c. 9)

Marine Mutiny Act 1864
- Act of Parliament
- Parliament of the United Kingdom
- Long title: An Act for the Regulation of Her Majesty's Royal Marine Forces while on shore.
- Citation: 27 & 28 Vict. c. 4
- Territorial extent: United Kingdom

Dates
- Royal assent: 18 March 1864
- Commencement: 18 March 1864
- Repealed: 11 August 1875
Other legislation
Repealed by	Statute Law Revision Act 1875

Status: Repealed

Text of statute as originally enacted

- The Marine Mutiny Act 1864 (27 & 28 Vict. c. 4)

Marine Mutiny Act 1865
- Act of Parliament
- Parliament of the United Kingdom
- Long title: An Act for the Regulation of Her Majesty's Royal Marine Forces while on shore.
- Citation: 28 & 29 Vict. c. 12
- Territorial extent: United Kingdom

Dates
- Royal assent: 7 April 1865
- Commencement: 7 April 1865
- Repealed: 11 August 1875
Other legislation
Repealed by	Statute Law Revision Act 1875

Status: Repealed

Text of statute as originally enacted

- The Marine Mutiny Act 1865 (28 & 29 Vict. c. 12)

Marine Mutiny Act 1866
- Act of Parliament
- Parliament of the United Kingdom
- Long title: An Act for the Regulation of Her Majesty's Royal Marine Forces while on shore.
- Citation: 29 & 30 Vict. c. 10
- Territorial extent: United Kingdom

Dates
- Royal assent: 23 March 1866
- Commencement: 23 March 1866
- Repealed: 11 August 1875
Other legislation
Repealed by	Statute Law Revision Act 1875

Status: Repealed

Text of statute as originally enacted

- The Marine Mutiny Act 1866 (29 & 30 Vict. c. 10)

Marine Mutiny Act 1867
- Act of Parliament
- Parliament of the United Kingdom
- Long title: An Act for the Regulation of Her Majesty's Royal Marine Forces while on shore.
- Citation: 30 & 31 Vict. c. 14
- Territorial extent: United Kingdom

Dates
- Royal assent: 12 April 1867
- Commencement: 12 April 1867
- Repealed: 11 August 1875
Other legislation
Repealed by	Statute Law Revision Act 1875

Status: Repealed

Text of statute as originally enacted

- The Marine Mutiny Act 1867 (30 & 31 Vict. c. 14)

Marine Mutiny Act 1868
- Act of Parliament
- Parliament of the United Kingdom
- Long title: An Act for the Regulation of Her Majesty's Royal Marine Forces while on shore.
- Citation: 31 & 32 Vict. c. 15
- Territorial extent: United Kingdom

Dates
- Royal assent: 3 April 1868
- Commencement: 3 April 1868
- Repealed: 11 August 1875
Other legislation
Repealed by	Statute Law Revision Act 1875

Status: Repealed

Text of statute as originally enacted

- The Marine Mutiny Act 1868 (31 & 32 Vict. c. 15)

Marine Mutiny Act 1869
- Act of Parliament
- Parliament of the United Kingdom
- Long title: An Act for the Regulation of Her Majesty's Royal Marine Forces while on shore.
- Citation: 32 & 33 Vict. c. 5
- Territorial extent: United Kingdom

Dates
- Royal assent: 19 April 1869
- Commencement: 19 April 1869
- Repealed: 25 August 1883
Other legislation
Repealed by	Statute Law Revision Act 1883

Status: Repealed

Text of statute as originally enacted

- The Marine Mutiny Act 1869 (32 & 33 Vict. c. 5)

Marine Mutiny Act 1870
- Act of Parliament
- Parliament of the United Kingdom
- Long title: An Act for the Regulation of Her Majesty's Royal Marine Forces while on shore.
- Citation: 33 & 34 Vict. c. 8
- Territorial extent: United Kingdom

Dates
- Royal assent: 4 April 1870
- Commencement: 4 April 1870
- Repealed: 25 August 1883
Other legislation
Repealed by	Statute Law Revision Act 1883

Status: Repealed

Text of statute as originally enacted

- The Marine Mutiny Act 1870 (33 & 34 Vict. c. 8)

Marine Mutiny Act 1871
- Act of Parliament
- Parliament of the United Kingdom
- Long title: An Act for the Regulation of Her Majesty's Royal Marine Forces while on shore.
- Citation: 34 & 35 Vict. c. 10
- Territorial extent: United Kingdom

Dates
- Royal assent: 24 April 1871
- Commencement: 24 April 1871
- Repealed: 25 August 1883
Other legislation
Repealed by	Statute Law Revision Act 1883

Status: Repealed

Text of statute as originally enacted

- The Marine Mutiny Act 1871 (34 & 35 Vict. c. 10)

Marine Mutiny Act 1872
- Act of Parliament
- Parliament of the United Kingdom
- Long title: An Act for the Regulation of Her Majesty's Royal Marine Forces while on shore.
- Citation: 35 & 36 Vict. c. 4
- Territorial extent: United Kingdom

Dates
- Royal assent: 23 April 1872
- Commencement: 23 April 1872
- Repealed: 25 August 1883
Other legislation
Repealed by	Statute Law Revision Act 1883

Status: Repealed

Text of statute as originally enacted

- The Marine Mutiny Act 1872 (35 & 36 Vict. c. 4)

Marine Mutiny Act 1873
- Act of Parliament
- Parliament of the United Kingdom
- Long title: An Act for the Regulation of Her Majesty's Royal Marine Forces while on shore.
- Citation: 36 & 37 Vict. c. 11
- Territorial extent: United Kingdom

Dates
- Royal assent: 24 April 1873
- Commencement: 24 April 1873
- Repealed: 25 August 1883
Other legislation
Repealed by	Statute Law Revision Act 1883

Status: Repealed

Text of statute as originally enacted

- The Marine Mutiny Act 1873 (36 & 37 Vict. c. 11)

Marine Mutiny Act 1874
- Act of Parliament
- Parliament of the United Kingdom
- Long title: An Act for the Regulation of Her Majesty's Royal Marine Forces while on shore.
- Citation: 37 & 38 Vict. c. 5
- Territorial extent: United Kingdom

Dates
- Royal assent: 24 April 1874
- Commencement: 24 April 1874
- Repealed: 25 August 1883
Other legislation
Repealed by	Statute Law Revision Act 1883

Status: Repealed

Text of statute as originally enacted

- The Marine Mutiny Act 1874 (37 & 38 Vict. c. 5)

Marine Mutiny Act 1875
- Act of Parliament
- Parliament of the United Kingdom
- Long title: An Act for the Regulation of Her Majesty's Royal Marine Forces while on shore.
- Citation: 38 & 39 Vict. c. 8
- Territorial extent: United Kingdom

Dates
- Royal assent: 22 April 1875
- Commencement: 22 April 1875
- Repealed: 25 August 1883
Other legislation
Repealed by	Statute Law Revision Act 1883

Status: Repealed

Text of statute as originally enacted

- The Marine Mutiny Act (1875) (38 & 39 Vict. c. 8). Also called the Royal Marines on Shore Act.

Marine Mutiny Act 1876
- Act of Parliament
- Parliament of the United Kingdom
- Long title: An Act for the Regulation of Her Majesty's Royal Marine Forces while on shore.
- Citation: 39 & 40 Vict. c. 9
- Territorial extent: United Kingdom

Dates
- Royal assent: 7 April 1876
- Commencement: 7 April 1876
- Repealed: 25 August 1883
Other legislation
Repealed by	Statute Law Revision Act 1883

Status: Repealed

Text of statute as originally enacted

- The Marine Mutiny Act 1876 (39 & 40 Vict. c .9)

Marine Mutiny Act 1877
- Act of Parliament
- Parliament of the United Kingdom
- Long title: An Act for the Regulation of Her Majesty's Royal Marine Forces while on shore.
- Citation: 40 & 41 Vict. c. 8
- Territorial extent: United Kingdom

Dates
- Royal assent: 24 April 1877
- Commencement: 24 April 1877
- Repealed: 25 August 1883
Other legislation
Repealed by	Statute Law Revision Act 1883

Status: Repealed

Text of statute as originally enacted

- The Marine Mutiny Act 1877 (40 & 41 Vict. c. 8)

Marine Mutiny Act 1878
- Act of Parliament
- Parliament of the United Kingdom
- Long title: An Act for the Regulation of Her Majesty's Royal Marine Forces while on shore.
- Citation: 41 & 42 Vict. c. 11
- Territorial extent: United Kingdom

Dates
- Royal assent: 16 April 1878
- Commencement: 16 April 1878
- Repealed: 28 August 1881
Other legislation
Amended by	Marine Mutiny Act (Temporary) Continuance Act 1879
Repealed by	Regulation of the Forces Act 1881

Status: Repealed

Text of statute as originally enacted

- The Marine Mutiny Act 1878 (41 & 42 Vict. c. 11)

Marine Mutiny Act (Temporary) Continuance Act 1879
- Act of Parliament
- Parliament of the United Kingdom
- Long title: An Act to continue for Three Months the Act of the Session of the forty-first and forty-second years of the reign of Her present Majesty, chapter eleven, intituled "An Act for the Regulation of Her Majesty's Royal Marine Forces while on shore."
- Citation: 42 & 43 Vict. c. 5
- Territorial extent: United Kingdom

Dates
- Royal assent: 21 March 1879
- Commencement: 21 March 1879
- Repealed: 25 August 1894
Other legislation
Amends	Marine Mutiny Act 1878
Repealed by	Statute Law Revision Act 1894

Status: Repealed

Text of statute as originally enacted

- The Marine Mutiny Act (Temporary) Continuance Act 1879 (42 & 43 Vict. c. 5)

== See also ==
- Incitement to Mutiny Act 1797
- Army Act
