= List of acts of the Parliament of England from 1693 =

This is a list of acts of the Parliament of England for the year 1693.

For acts passed during the period 1707–1800, see the list of acts of the Parliament of Great Britain. See also the list of acts of the Parliament of Scotland, and the list of acts of the Parliament of Ireland.

For acts passed from 1801 onwards, see the list of acts of the Parliament of the United Kingdom. For acts of the devolved parliaments and assemblies in the United Kingdom, see the list of acts of the Scottish Parliament, the list of acts of the Northern Ireland Assembly, and the list of acts and measures of Senedd Cymru; see also the list of acts of the Parliament of Northern Ireland.

For medieval statutes, etc. that are not considered to be acts of Parliament, see the list of English statutes.

See also the List of ordinances and acts of the Parliament of England, 1642–1660 for ordinances and acts passed by the Long Parliament and other bodies without royal assent, and which were not considered to be valid legislation following the Restoration in 1660.

The number shown after each act's title is its chapter number. Acts are cited using this number, preceded by the years of the reign during which the relevant parliamentary session was held; thus the Union with Ireland Act 1800 is cited as "39 & 40 Geo. 3. c. 67", meaning the 67th act passed during the session that started in the 39th year of the reign of George III and which finished in the 40th year of that reign. The modern convention is to use Arabic numerals in citations (thus "41 Geo. 3" rather than "41 Geo. III"). Acts of the last session of the Parliament of Great Britain and the first session of the Parliament of the United Kingdom are both cited as "41 Geo. 3".

Acts passed by the Parliament of England did not have a short title; however, some of these acts have subsequently been given a short title by acts of the Parliament of the United Kingdom, such as the Short Titles Act 1896 (59 & 60 Vict. c. 14).

Acts passed by the Parliament of England were deemed to have come into effect on the first day of the session in which they were passed. Because of this, the years given in the list below may in fact be the year before a particular act was passed.

== 5 Will. & Mar. ==
The fifth session of the 2nd Parliament of William and Mary, which met from 7 November 1693 until 25 April 1694.

This session was also traditionally cited as 5 Will. & Mary, 5 Gul. & Mar., 5 Gul. et. Mar. or 5 W. & M.

=== Public acts ===
Short title	Citation	Royal assent
Long title
Land Tax Act 1693 (repealed)	5 Will. & Mar. c. 1	25 January 1694
An Act for granting to Their Majesties an Aid of Foure Shillings in the Pound, for One yeare, for carrying on a vigorous War against France. (Note: The Nine Years' War.) (Repealed by Statute Law Revision Act 1867 (30 & 31 Vict. c. 59))
Importation Act 1693 (repealed)	5 Will. & Mar. c. 2	25 January 1694
An Act for repealing such parts of several former Acts (Note: Taxation Act 1692 (4 Will. & Mar. c. 5)) (Note: Taxation, etc. Act 1692 (4 Will. & Mar. c. 3)) (Note: Trade with France Act 1688 (1 Will. & Mar. Sess. 1. c. 34)) as prevent or prohibit the importacion of Forreign Brandy, Aqua vite, and other Spirits, and Bacon, except from France. (Repealed by Statute Law Revision Act 1867 (30 & 31 Vict. c. 59))
Importation (No. 2) Act 1693 (repealed)	5 Will. & Mar. c. 3	25 January 1694
An Act for the importation of fine Italian, Sicilian, and Naples Thrown Silke. (Repealed by Statute Law Revision Act 1867 (30 & 31 Vict. c. 59))
Justice of the Peace in Wales Act 1693 (repealed)	5 Will. & Mar. c. 4	25 January 1694
An Act to repeal a Clause in the Statute made in the four and thirtieth and five and thirtieth Years of King Henry the Eighth, (Note: Laws in Wales Act 1542 (34 & 35 Hen. 8. c. 26)) by which Justices of Peace in Wales are limitted to Eight in each County. (Repealed by Statute Law Revision Act 1948 (11 & 12 Geo. 6. c. 62))
Government Life Annuities Act 1693 (repealed)	5 Will. & Mar. c. 5	8 February 1694
An Act to supply the deficiency of the money raised by a former Act entituled "An Act for granting to their Majesties certain Rates and Duties of Excise upon Beer Ale and other Liquors for secureing certaine Recompences and Advantages in the said Act mencioned to such persons as shall voluntarily advance the summ of Ten hundred thousand pounds towards carrying on the Warr against France." (Repealed by Statute Law Revision Act 1867 (30 & 31 Vict. c. 59))
Royal Mines Act 1693	5 Will. & Mar. c. 6	8 February 1694
An Act to prevent Disputes and Controversies concerning Royal Mines.
House of Commons (Disqualification) Act 1693 (repealed)	5 & 6 Will. & Mar. c. 7 (Note: Although passed on the same day as the first acts listed in 5 & 6 Will. & Mar., this act is normally listed under 5 Will. and Mar.); 5 Will. & Mar. c. 7	23 March 1694
An Act for granting to their Majesties certain Rates and Duties upon Salt and upon Beer, Ale and other Liquors for secureing certaine Recompences and Advantages in the said Act mencioed to such Persons as shall voluntarily advance the summ of Ten hundred thousand Pounds towards carrying on the Warr against France. (Repealed by House of Commons Disqualification Act 1957 (5 & 6 Eliz. 2. c. 20))

=== Private acts ===
Short title	Citation	Royal assent
Long title
Vivian's Estate Act 1693	5 Will. & Mar. c. 1 Pr.	25 January 1694
An Act to enable John Vivian Esquire, and Thomas Vivian his Son, to sell some Part of their Estate, for Payment of Debts, and to make Provision for Younger Children; and for settling other Part of their Estate in Lieu thereof.
Clayton's Estate Act 1693	5 Will. & Mar. c. 2 Pr.	8 February 1694
An Act to indemnify the Trustees of James Clayton Esquire for joining with him in selling Lands, for Payment of his Debts.

=== Sources ===
- Raithby, John, ed. (1963) [1819]. "5° Gul. & Mar.". Statutes of the Realm. Vol. 6: The Statutes of King James II, and King William and Queen Mary (1685–1694). London: Dawsons. pp. 426–461 – via HathiTrust.
- Raithby, John, ed. (1819). Statutes of the Realm. Vol. 6: 1685-94 – via British History Online.
- Pickering, Danby, ed. (1764). "Anno quinto Gulielmi & Mariæ". The Statutes at Large. Vol. 9: From the First Year of K. William and Q. Mary to Eighth Year of K. William III – 1688 to 1695–96. Cambridge: Joseph Bentham. pp. 236–244 – via Internet Archive.
- Pickering, Danby, ed. (1764). "Anno quinto Gulielmi & Mariæ". The Statutes at Large. Vol. 9: From the First Year of K. William and Q. Mary to Eighth Year of K. William III – 1688 to 1695–96. Cambridge: Joseph Bentham. pp. 236–244 – via Internet Archive.
- Pickering, Danby, ed. (1764). "Anno quinto & sexto Gulielmi & Mariæ". The Statutes at Large. Vol. 9: From the First Year of K. William and Q. Mary to Eighth Year of K. William III – 1688 to 1695–96. Cambridge: Joseph Bentham. pp. 244–261 – via Internet Archive.
- Pickering, Danby, ed. (1764). "Anno quinto & sexto Gulielmi & Mariæ". The Statutes at Large. Vol. 9: From the First Year of K. William and Q. Mary to Eighth Year of K. William III – 1688 to 1695–96. Cambridge: Joseph Bentham. pp. 244–261 – via Internet Archive.
- Chronological Table of and Index to the Statutes. Vol. 1: To the End of the Session 59 Vict. Sess. 2 (1895) (13th ed.). London: Her Majesty's Stationery Office. 1896. pp. 76–77 – via Google Books.
- "Acts of the English Parliament from 1693". legislation.gov.uk. The National Archives.
- "Chronological Tables of the Private and Personal Acts: Part 4 (1685–1694)". legislation.gov.uk. The National Archives.

== See also ==
- List of acts of the Parliament of England
