= 2nd Parliament of William III and Mary II =

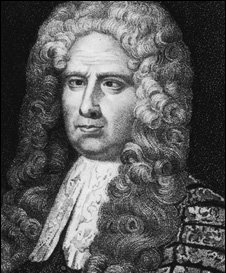
Sir John Trevor, Speaker

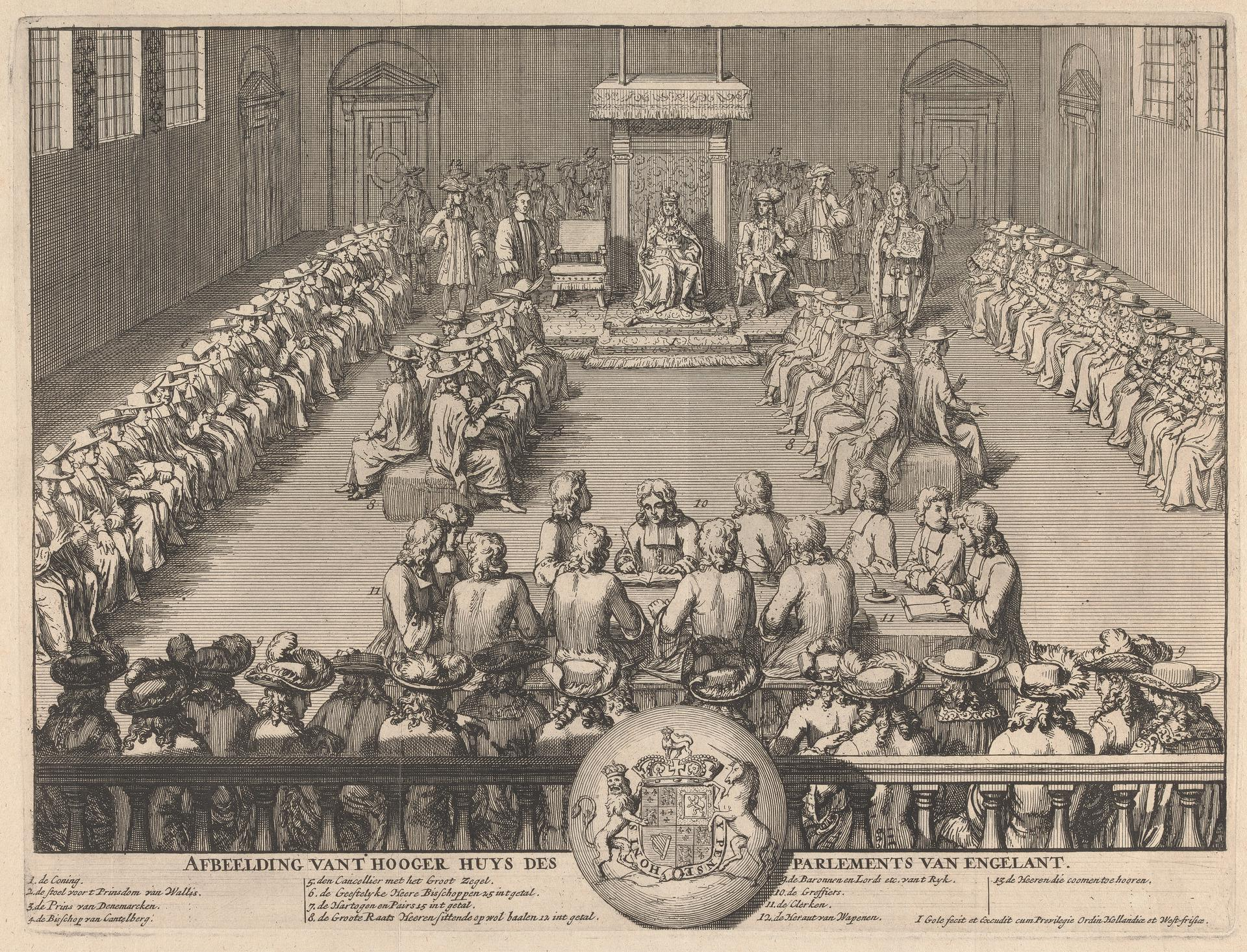
The House of Lords, depicted in a 1695 Dutch engraving.

The 2nd Parliament of King William III and Queen Mary II was summoned by William III of England and Mary II of England on 6 February 1690 and assembled on 20 March 1690.

== Party lines ==
The new parliament was more or less equally divided along party lines, with 243 Whig and 241 Tory members, plus 28 others. Sir John Trevor was installed as Speaker of the House of Commons. The ministry, however, was not formed on party lines but drawn from both parties, albeit dominated by Tories. Its nominal head was the Lord Treasurer, Marquess of Carmarthen.

In the second session a number of innovative measures were approved to deal with the question of raising the large amounts of short-term money required to finance the Williamite war in Ireland and the Nine Years War in Europe and North America. These introduced the practice of deficit financing and an institutionalised National Debt.

By 1694, towards the end of the parliament, the Whig party, led by the First Whig Junto, were in the ascendancy and dominating the government. The 1693–94 session concerned itself with the raising of huge amounts of money to support the war effort. A financial crisis was averted when the new Chancellor of the Exchequer, Charles Montagu introduced the successful Million Lottery and established the Bank of England.

The 6th and last session of the parliament began in November 1694. After the death of Queen Mary in December the Tories were again resurgent and highly critical of the cost and conduct of the war with France. But accusations of corruption against certain leading Tories resulted in the replacement of the Speaker by Paul Foley and the impeachment of Lord Carmarthen, now the Duke of Leeds. The scandals obliged the King to dissolve the parliament on 11 October 1695.

== Notable acts of the parliament ==
- Crown and Parliament Recognition Act 1689
- Admiralty Act 1690
- Correspondence with Enemies Act 1691
- Poor Relief Act 1691
- Royal Mines Act 1693
- House of Commons (Disqualification) Act 1693
- Bank of England Act 1694
- Meeting of Parliament Act 1694 (or Triennial Act 1694)
- Profane Swearing Act 1694

== See also ==
- 1690 English general election
- Carmarthen ministry 1690–1694
- Acts of the Parliament of England/William III & Mary II
- List of parliaments of England
