= Profane Oaths Act 1745 =

Act of the Parliament of Great Britain

Profane Oaths Act 1745 (Note: The citation of this act by this short title was authorised by section 1 of, and the first schedule to, the Short Titles Act 1896. Due to the repeal of those provisions it is now authorised by section 19(2) of the Interpretation Act 1978.)
- Act of Parliament
- Parliament of Great Britain
- Long title: An Act more effectually to prevent profane Cursing and Swearing.
- Citation: 19 Geo. 2. c. 21
- Territorial extent: Great Britain

Dates
- Royal assent: 4 June 1746
- Commencement: 1 June 1746 (Note: Section 1.)
- Repealed: 21 July 1967
Other legislation
Repeals/revokes	Profane Swearing Act 1623; Profane Swearing Act 1694; Statute Law Revision Act 1867; Summary Jurisdiction Act 1884; Statute Law Revision Act 1888; Public Authorities Protection Act 1893
Amended by	Justices of the Peace Act 1949; Magistrates' Courts Act 1952
Repealed by	Criminal Law Act 1967

Status: Repealed

Text of statute as originally enacted

The Profane Oaths Act 1745 (19 Geo. 2. c. 21) was an act of the Parliament of Great Britain passed in 1746, in effect from 1 June 1746, and formally repealed in 1967. It established a system of fines payable for "profane cursing and swearing".

The preamble described the ubiquity of the "horrid, impious, and execrable vices of profane cursing and swearing" in the country, saying that this "may justly provoke the divine vengeance to increase the many calamities these nations now labour under", and that the existing laws designed to prevent this were ineffective. Many of the provisions in the act were essentially the same as those in the 1694 act which it replaced.

== Overview ==
The act established that any person who cursed profanely or swore, on the conviction by the oath of witnesses in front of a justice of the peace or by their own confession, was liable to be fined; if the crime took place in front of a justice of the peace (or a town's mayor, bailiff, etc.), then they could be convicted requiring no other evidence. Any constable or peace officer who observed anyone not known to them breaking the act was empowered to arrest the person and bring them before the justice, where they were to be convicted on the officer's oath; if the person was known to them, they were to lay that information before the justices, who were to charge them to appear for conviction.

All convictions were to take place within eight days of the offence, be recorded in a specified form, and archived in the county records.

== Fines ==
The fines were established at 5s for any person at or above the degree of a gentleman; 2s for any person below that degree; and 1s for a "day labourer" or any common soldier, sailor or seaman. A second offence was to be fined at double the rate, and a third or later offence at treble. Should an offender not pay the fine or give security, they were to be imprisoned in the house of correction for ten days of hard labour; if a soldier or seaman, they were to be set in the stocks for an hour (or for two hours, for multiple offences). The offender was liable for all costs, or for six additional days imprisonment if costs were not paid, and all fines were to be disposed of to the poor of the parish.

Any justice or magistrate who avoided carrying out their duties under the act were to be fined £5, half going to the informant and half to the parish poor relief; any constable or peace officer doing the same was liable to a fine of 40s, divided the same way, and if unable to meet this was liable to a month's imprisonment.

The act was to be read four times a year in all parish churches and public chapels, with the parson or curate liable to a fine of £5 if this duty was omitted.

== Repeal of earlier acts ==
The act repealed the existing legislation on the matter, the Profane Swearing Act 1623 (21 Jas. 1. c. 20) and the Profane Swearing Act 1694 (6 & 7 Will. & Mar. c. 11).

== Subsequent developments ==
Section 11 of the act was repealed by section 2 of, and the schedule to, the Public Authorities Protection Act 1893 (56 & 57 Vict. c. 61), which came into force on 1 January 1894.

The whole act was repealed by section 13(2) of, and part I of schedule 4 to, the Criminal Law Act 1967, which came into force on 21 July 1967.

Today swearing in public is often dealt with by the police and courts under section 5 of the Public Order Act 1986. However a person is only guilty of this offence if it is committed "within the hearing or sight of a person likely to be caused harassment, alarm or distress thereby."

== In fiction ==
One of A P Herbert's misleading cases was Rex v Haddock: Is a Golfer a Gentleman? Summoned under the act, Haddock argued that while playing golf, he was so bad at it that he could no longer be regarded as a gentleman, and therefore his fine for swearing should be lower.
