= House of Commons (Disqualification) Act 1693 =

Act of the Parliament of England

House of Commons (Disqualification) Act 1693 (Note: The citation of this act by this short title was authorised by section 5 of, and the second schedule to, the Statute Law Revision Act 1948. Due to the repeal of those provisions, it is now authorised by section 19(2) of the Interpretation Act 1978.)
- Act of Parliament
- Parliament of England
- Long title: An Act for granting to their Majesties certain Rates and Duties upon Salt and upon Beer, Ale and other Liquors for secureing certaine Recompences and Advantages in the said Act mencioed to such Persons as shall voluntarily advance the summ of Ten hundred thousand Pounds towards carrying on the Warr against France (Note: These words are printed against this act in the second column of the second schedule to the Statute Law Revision Act 1948, which is headed "Title".)
- Citation: 5 & 6 Will. & Mar. c. 7 (Note: This is the citation in the Statute Law Revision Act 1948 (11 & 12 Geo. 6. c. 62)); 5 Will. & Mar. c. 7 (Note: This is the citation in The Statutes of the Realm, the Electoral Act 1963 and the Chronological Table of the Statutes)
- Territorial extent: England and Wales; Ireland

Dates
- Royal assent: 23 March 1694
- Commencement: 25 March 1694 (Note: Section 1.)
- Repealed: England and Wales and Northern Ireland: 17 April 1957; Republic of Ireland: 9 December 1963 (Note: The Electoral Act 1963 (Commencement) (No. 2) Order 1963 (SI 1963/245).)
Other legislation
Amended by	Weights and Measures Act 1824; Statute Law Revision Act 1867
Repealed by	House of Commons Disqualification Act 1957

Status: Repealed

Text of statute as originally enacted

The House of Commons (Disqualification) Act 1693 (5 Will. & Mar. c. 7) was an act of the Parliament of England.

== Subsequent developments ==
The whole act, except the section 59, was repealed by section 1 of, and the schedule to, the Statute Law Revision Act 1867 (30 & 31 Vict. c. 59), which came into force on 15 July 1867.

The whole act was repealed for England and Wales and Northern Ireland by section 14(1) of, and part I of schedule 4 to, the House of Commons Disqualification Act 1957 ( 5 & 6 Eliz. 2. c. 20), which came into force on 17 April 1957.

The whole act was repealed for the Republic of Ireland by section 3 of, and schedule 1 to, the Electoral Act 1963, which came into force on 9 December 1963. That schedule describes the subject matter of this act as "restriction on member of House of Commons from being concerned in collection of revenue".

== See also ==
- House of Commons Disqualification Act
