= Royal Mines Act 1693 =

Act of the Parliament of England

Royal Mines Act 1693 (Note: The citation of this act by this short title was authorised by section 5 of, and the second schedule to, the Statute Law Revision Act 1948. Due to the repeal of those provisions, it is now authorised by section 19(2) of the Interpretation Act 1978.)
- Act of Parliament
- Parliament of England
- Long title: An Act to prevent Disputes and Controversies concerning Royal Mines. (Note: These words are printed against this act in the second column of the second schedule to the Statute Law Revision Act 1948, which is headed "Title".)
- Citation: 5 Will. & Mar. c. 6
- Territorial extent: England and Wales

Dates
- Royal assent: 8 February 1694
- Commencement: 7 November 1693 (Note: Start of session.)
Other legislation
Amended by	Statute Law Revision Act 1948; Statute Law (Repeals) Act 1969
Relates to	Mines Royal Act 1688

Status: Amended

Text of statute as originally enacted

Revised text of statute as amended

The Royal Mines Act 1693 (5 Will. & Mar. c. 6) is an act of the Parliament of England.

As of 2026, the act remains partly in force in England and Wales.

== Subsequent developments ==
Section 2 of the act was repealed by section 1 of, and part VII of the schedule to, the Statute Law (Repeals) Act 1969, which came into force on 1 January 1970.
