= 1689 English general election =

General election in England

1689 (or 1688) English general election
- January 1689

All 513 seats in the House of Commons 257 seats needed for a majority
	First party	Second party
Party	Whig	Tory
Seats won	319	232
- Composition of the House of Commons after the election

The 1689 English general election, held in January 1689 (or near the end of 1688, old style), elected the Convention Parliament, which was summoned in the aftermath of the Glorious Revolution.

513 Members of Parliament were returned, across 53 counties and 217 boroughs in England and Wales, most having the right to return two members. Only nine counties and 41 boroughs had contested elections, with all the other candidates being returned unopposed. Six boroughs had double returns, where multiple members were recorded as elected, and five of these were subsequently voided by Parliament, forcing by-elections.

The majority of seats were not contested on a party basis, but partisan alignment can be identified by historians looking at subsequent voting on key issues. 174 members are identified as Whigs, and 151 as Tories. The remaining members, around 190, are considered uncommitted. An older estimate based on activity throughout the Parliament suggested that the 551 Members (including those returned in by-elections) could be listed as 232 Tories and 319 Whigs or Court Tories, with none classed as uncommitted (but with over 40% recorded as "inactive"). Finally, an estimate at the end of the parliament, when party groups had had time to develop further, estimated the strength of the parties as 254 Whigs, 221 Tories, and 38 uncommitted members.

== See also ==
- List of MPs elected to the English Parliament in 1689
- Convention Parliament (1689)
- List of English Parliaments
