= Profane Swearing Act 1694 =

Act of the Parliament of England

- Act of Parliament
- Parliament of England
- Long title: An Act for the more effectuall suppressing prophane Cursing and Swearing.
- Citation: 6 & 7 Will. & Mar. c. 11
- Territorial extent: England and Wales

Dates
- Royal assent: 22 April 1695
- Commencement: 24 June 1695 (Note: Section 1.)
- Repealed: 1 June 1746
Other legislation
| Repealed by | Profane Oaths Act 1745 |
| Relates to | Profane Swearing Act 1623 |

Status: Repealed

Text of statute as originally enacted

The Profane Swearing Act 1694 (6 & 7 Will. & Mar. c. 11) was an act of the Parliament of England in effect from 24 June 1695 and repealed in 1746. It established a system of fines payable for "suppressing prophane Cursing and Swearing".

The preamble recited the provisions of the Profane Swearing Act 1623 (21 Jas. 1. c. 20), noting that it had not been effective at suppressing "those detestable sins" due to various perceived deficiencies in the act.

The act provided that any person who profanely swore or cursed in the presence of a justice of the peace, or a town mayor, and was convicted on the oath of one witness or by their own confession, was to pay a fine. The fines were established at 1s for a servant, labourer, common soldier or seaman, and 2s for any other person; a second offence was to be fined at double the rate, and a third or later offence at treble. The monies thus received were to be used for the poor relief of that parish. Should an offender not pay the fine or give security, they were to be set in the stocks for an hour (or for two hours, for multiple offences); if under sixteen, they were to be whipped by the parish constable.

Any justice or magistrate who avoided carrying out their duties under the act were to be fined 5l, half going to the informant. All convictions were to take place within ten days of the offence, and be recorded in a special book kept for the purpose. The act was to be read four times a year in all parish churches and public chapels, with the parson or curate liable to a fine of 20s if this duty was neglected.

== Subsequent developments ==
The whole act was repealed by section 15 of the Profane Oaths Act 1745 (19 Geo. 2. c. 21), came into force on 1 June 1746. The act which restated its general provisions, increased the fines for gentlemen and higher ranks, and provided for stricter enforcement.
