= Mines Royal Act 1688 =

Act of the Parliament of England

Royal Mines Act 1688 (Note: The citation of this act by this short title was authorised by section 5 of, and the second schedule to, the Statute Law Revision Act 1948. Due to the repeal of those provisions, it is now authorised by section 19(2) of the Interpretation Act 1978.)
- Act of Parliament
- Parliament of England
- Long title: An Act to Repeale the Statute made in the fifth yeare of King Henry the Fourth against the Multiplying Gold and Silver. (Note: These words are printed against this act in the second column of the second schedule to the Statute Law Revision Act 1948, which is headed "Title".)
- Citation: 1 Will. & Mar. c. 30 (Note: This is the citation in The Statutes of the Realm.); 1 Will. & Mar. Sess. 1. c. 30 (Note: This is the citation in The Statutes at Large.)
- Territorial extent: England and Wales

Dates
- Royal assent: 20 August 1689
- Commencement: 13 February 1689 (Note: Start of session.)

Other legislation
- Amends: Gold and Silver Act 1403
- Amended by: Statute Law Revision Act 1867; Statute Law Revision Act 1948
- Relates to: Royal Mines Act 1693

Status: Amended

Text of statute as originally enacted

Revised text of statute as amended

Text of the Mines Royal Act 1688 as in force today (including any amendments) within the United Kingdom, from legislation.gov.uk.

The Royal Mines Act 1688 (1 Will. & Mar. c. 30) (Note: Also cited as 1 Will. & Mar. Sess. 1. c. 30), sometimes referred to as the Mines Royal Act 1688, is an act of the Parliament of England.

As of 2026, the act is partly in force in Great Britain.

The act repealed the part of the Act Against Multipliers, the Gold and Silver Act 1403 (5 Hen. 4. c. 4), which had made it a felony to create gold and silver by means of alchemy.

The act specified also that "no mine of tin, copper, iron or, lead, shall hereafter be adjudged, reputed, or taken to be a royal mine although gold or silver may be extracted out of the same." In doing so, the act brought to an end the monopolies of the Society of Mines Royal and the Company of Mineral and Battery Works which had enjoyed exclusive rights to extract metal from certain mines.

According to Isaac Newton, in a letter to John Locke, Robert Boyle 'procured the repeal of the Act of Parliament against Multipliers'. He further claimed that Boyle must then have had in his hands a recipe for the production of gold by alchemical means.

== Subsequent developments ==
The whole act, except the last section, was repealed by section 1 of, and the schedule to, the Statute Law Revision Act 1867 (30 & 31 Vict. c. 59), which came into force on 15 July 1867.

In section 3 of the act, the words to "aforesaid that" were repealed by section 1 of, and the first schedule to, the Statute Law Revision Act 1948 (11 & 12 Geo. 6. c. 62)

== See also ==
- Royal Mines Act 1693
