= 1690 English general election =

General election in England

- February – March 1690

All 512 seats in the House of Commons 257 seats needed for a majority
	First party	Second party	Third party
Party	Tory	Whig	Independent
Seats won	243	241	28
- Composition of the House of Commons after the election

The 1690 English general election occurred after the dissolution of the Convention Parliament summoned in the aftermath of the Glorious Revolution, and saw the partisan feuds in that parliament continue in the constituencies. The Tories made significant gains against their opponents, particularly in the contested counties and boroughs, as the electorate saw the Whigs increasingly as a source of instability and a threat to the Church of England.

Following the election, William continued his policy of forming a coalition government around non-partisan figures. The nominal leader of the new government was the Marquess of Carnarvon, though the Tories were able to use their greater numbers in the House of Commons to increase their share of government positions. Contests occurred in 103 constituencies, 38% of the total.

Party strengths are as estimated by the History of Parliament, though division lists for this parliament are not available and so a precise count may not be possible.

== Summary of the constituencies ==
See 1796 British general election for details. The constituencies used in England and Wales were the same throughout the period. In 1707 alone the 45 Scottish members were not elected from the constituencies, but were returned by co-option of a part of the membership of the last Parliament of Scotland elected before the Union.

== See also ==
- 2nd Parliament of William and Mary
- List of parliaments of England
