= Statute Law Revision Act 1950 =

Act of the Parliament of the United Kingdom

Statute Law Revision Act 1950 (Note: Section 6.)
- Act of Parliament
- Parliament of the United Kingdom
- Long title: An Act for further promoting the Revision of the Statute Law by repealing Enactments which have ceased to be in force or have become unnecessary and for facilitating the publication of Revised Editions of the Statutes.
- Citation: 14 Geo. 6. c. 6
- Territorial extent: United Kingdom

Dates
- Royal assent: 23 May 1950
- Commencement: 23 May 1950 (Note: The Acts of Parliament (Commencement) Act 1793.)
Other legislation
Amended by	Statute Law Revision Act 1953; Courts Act 1971; Northern Ireland Constitution Act 1973; Administration of Justice Act 1977; Statute Law (Repeals) Act 1993; Statute Law (Repeals) Act 1998
Relates to	Repeal of Obsolete Statutes Act 1856; See Statute Law Revision Act

Status: Amended

Text of statute as originally enacted

The Statute Law Revision Act 1950 (14 Geo. 6. c. 6) is an act of the Parliament of the United Kingdom.

As of 2026, the act remains partly in the United Kingdom.

== Provisions ==
Section 1 of the act detailed how the act would function, and what it did or did not apply to. Some of the provisions were that the act did not affect hereditary Royal revenues (Subsection 1, paragraph 5), and that the act did not apply retrospectively (Subsection 1, paragraph 6).

Section 3 of the act provides that the sections specified in the first column of the fourth schedule to that act have effect, and are deemed always to have had effect, as if the references in this schedule, to the words and subsection respectively referred of those sections which are specified in the second column of the fourth schedule to that act had been omitted from this act.

Section 4 of the act reads "In this Act, unless the context otherwise requires, the expression “enactment” includes an enactment comprised in Church Assembly Measure." This meant that the act, and the provisions of it, such as the repeal of a previous act, also applied to the acts of the Church Assembly, since changes to church governance or practice had to be done by an act of parliament due to the Church of England Assembly (Powers) Act 1919 (9 & 10 Geo. 5. c. 76) .

=== Repealed enactments ===
Section 1(1) of the act repealed 1,340 enactments, listed in the first, second and third schedules to the act.

==== First schedule: Enactments of the Parliaments of England, Great Britain and the United Kingdom ====
First schedule — Enactments of the Parliaments of England, Great Britain and the United Kingdom
Citation	Short title	Description	Extent of repeal
20 Hen. 3. Stat. Merton. c. 1	Damages on Writ Dower Act 1235	Damages to widows on writ of dower.	The whole chapter, in so far as it extends to Northern Ireland.
20 Hen. 3. Stat. Merton. c. 4	Commons Act 1236	The Commons Act, 1236.	The whole chapter, in so far as it extends to Northern Ireland.
6 Edw. 1. Stat. Glouc. c. 1	Franchise Act 1278	Damages in Novel Disseisin. In Mort d'Auncestor, Cosinage, etc.	The whole chapter, so far as unrepealed, in so far as it extends to Northern Ireland.
12 Edw. 1. Stat. Rothlan.	Provisiones facete in Scaccario	Provisions made in the Exchequer.	The whole statute, in so far as it extends to Northern Ireland.
13 Edw. 1. Stat. Westm. sec. c. 2	Replevin Act 1285	Mischiefs to lords distraining their tenants by replevins.	The whole chapter, in so far as it extends to Northern Ireland.
13 Edw. 1. Stat. Westm. sec. c. 5	Recovery of Advowsons Act 1285	Three original writs of advowson.	The whole chapter, in so far as it extends to Northern Ireland.
13 Edw. 1. Stat. Westm. sec. c. 30	Justices of nisi prius, etc.	Assignment of justices of nisi prius.	The whole chapter, in so far as it extends to Northern Ireland.
13 Edw. 1. Stat. Westm. sec. c. 31	Bills of exceptions	Proceedings on bills of exceptions.	The whole chapter, in so far as it extends to Northern Ireland.
13 Edw. 1. Stat. Westm. Sec. c. 46	Commons Act 1285	The Commons Act, 1285.	The whole chapter, so far as unrepealed, in so far as it extends to Northern Ireland.
13 Edw. 1. Stat. Circumspecte Agatis.	Prohibition to Spiritual Court Act 1285	The Statute of Circumspecte Agatis.	The whole statute, so far as unrepealed, in so far as it extends to Northern Ireland.
18 Edw. 1. Stat. de Consultatione.	Statutum de Consultatione	The Statute of the Writ of Consultation.	The whole statute, in so far as it extends to Northern Ireland.
27 Edw. 1. Stat. de Finibus. c. 3	Statutum de Finibus Levatis	Justices of Assise shall be of Justices of Gaol Delivery. Such Justices shall punish sheriffs offending against Stat. Westm. 1.	The whole chapter, in so far as it extends to Northern Ireland.
27 Edw. 1. Stat. de Finibus. c. 4	Statutum de Finibus Levatis	Nisi prius shall be granted before one of the Judges of the Court where the suit is commenced.	The whole chapter, in so far as it extends to Northern Ireland.
28 Edw. 1. Artic. sup. Cart. c. 3	Inquests within Verge, etc. Act 1300	Of what things only the steward and marshal of the King's House shall hold plea. What coroners shall inquire of the death of a man slain within the verge.	The whole chapter, in so far as it extends to Northern Ireland.
9 Edw. 2. Stat. 1. Articuli Cleri. c. 1	Prohibition	No prohibition in suits for Tythes, etc.	The whole chapter, so far as unrepealed, in so far as it extends to Northern Ireland.
9 Edw. 2. Stat. 1. Articuli Cleri. c. 2	Prohibition	Penance pecuniary and corporal.	The whole chapter, so far as unrepealed, in so far as it extends to Northern Ireland.
9 Edw. 2. Stat. 1. Articuli Cleri. c. 6	Ecclesiastical court	Jurisdiction of the King's Court jointly with the spiritual.	The whole chapter, so far as unrepealed, in so far as it extends to Northern Ireland.
9 Edw. 2. Stat. 1. Articuli Cleri. c. 7	Ecclesiastical court	The King's letter to discharge an excommunicate shall not issue.	The whole chapter, in so far as it extends to Northern Ireland.
9 Edw. 2. Stat. 1. Articuli Cleri. c. 8	Residence on benefice	Clerks in the King's service, not bound to residence.	The whole chapter, in so far as it extends to Northern Ireland.
9 Edw. 2. Stat. 1. Articuli Cleri. c. 9	Distress on the clergy	Distresses on the clergy shall not be taken in the highways, nor in the ancient fees of the church.	The whole chapter, in so far as it extends to Northern Ireland.
9 Edw. 2. Stat. 1. Articuli Cleri. c. 13	Clergy	Examination of a parson presented belongeth to a spiritual judge.	The whole chapter, in so far as it extends to Northern Ireland.
9 Edw. 2. Stat. 1. Articuli Cleri. c. 14	Church	Free election of dignities of the church.	The whole chapter, in so far as it extends to Northern Ireland.
12 Edw. 2. Stat. Ebor. c. 3	N/A	Inquests determinable in the Benches may be taken in the Country.	The whole chapter, in so far as it extends to Northern Ireland.
12 Edw. 2. Stat. Ebor. c. 4	N/A	Justices of nisi prius may record Nonsuits, Defaults, etc.	The whole chapter, in so far as it extends to Northern Ireland.
Prerogativa Regis c. 10 (Note: This is the citation in The Statutes of the Realm.)	Benefice	The King's presentation to vacant churches.	The whole chapter, in so far as it extends to Northern Ireland.
2 Edw. 3. c. 2	Pardons for Felony, Justices of Assize, etc. Act 1328	Pardons for felony. Justices of Assize and gaol delivery. Oyers et terminers.	The whole chapter, so far as unrepealed, in so far as it extends to Northern Ireland.
4 Edw. 3. c. 11	Justices of assize	Justices of Assises and Nisi Prius may inquire concerning Maintainers, etc.	The whole chapter, in so far as it extends to Northern Ireland.
14 Edw. 3. Stat. 1. c. 6	Amendment of records	Records defective by misprision of Clerks amendable.	The whole chapter, in so far as it extends to Northern Ireland.
14 Edw. 3. Stat. 1. c. 16	Nisi prius	Nisi prius may be granted before a justice of common pleas in a suit in King's Bench.	The whole chapter, in so far as it extends to Northern Ireland.
20 Edw. 3.	Ordinance for the Justices	Ordinance for the justices.	The whole statute, so far as unrepealed, in so far as it extends to Northern Ireland.
25 Edw. 3. Stat. 6. c. 1	Confirmation of privileges of clergy	Confirmation of privileges and franchises. The King's presentation to benefices in right of another, limited to titles in his own time.	The whole chapter, in so far as it extends to Northern Ireland.
25 Edw. 3. Stat. 6. c. 3	Presentation to benefices by the King	On presentations in another's right, the King's title shall be examined.	The whole chapter, in so far as it extends to Northern Ireland.
25 Edw. 3. Stat. 6. c. 7	King's Title to Benefice Act 1351	The title taken to the King for a benefice lapsed may be counterpleaded.	The whole chapter, in so far as it extends to Northern Ireland.
25 Edw. 3. Stat. 6. c. 8	Cognizance of avoidance of benefices	Cognizance of avoidance of benefices declared to appertain to the ecclesiastical judge.	The whole chapter, in so far as it extends to Northern Ireland.
34 Edw. 3. c. 20	Exportation of Corn Act 1361	Exportation of corn forbidden.	The whole chapter, in so far as it extends to Northern Ireland.
36 Edw. 3. c. 8	Wages of priests	The wages of priests.	The whole chapter, in so far as it extends to Northern Ireland.
8 Ric. 2. c. 4	False entries of pleas, etc.	Penalty on Judge or Clerk making a false entry, etc.	The whole chapter, in so far as it extends to Northern Ireland.
13 Ric. 2. Stat. 1. c. 1	King's presentation to benefice	The Statute 25 Edw. 3, Stat. 6, c. 3, confirmed. The King's presentee shall not be admitted to any benefice full of an incumbent till the King hath recovered by law.	The whole chapter, in so far as it extends to Northern Ireland.
15 Ric. 2. c. 6	Appropriation of benefices	On appropriation of benefices provision shall be made for the poor and the vicar.	The whole chapter, in so far as it extends to Northern Ireland.
4 Hen. 4. c. 12	Enforcement of 15 Ric. 2 c. 6 Act 1402	Statute 15 Ric. 2. c. 6, touching the appropriation of churches, confirmed.	The whole chapter, in so far as it extends to Northern Ireland.
1 Hen. 5. c. 5	Statute of Additions (details on original writs and indictments	In original Writs, etc., Additions of Defendants' Degree, etc., shall be put.	The whole chapter, in so far as it extends to Northern Ireland.
2 Hen. 5. Stat. 1. c. 3	Libels in Spiritual Courts	Copies of the libels in the spiritual courts shall be duly delivered.	The whole chapter, in so far as it extends to Northern Ireland.
9 Hen. 5. Stat. 1. c. 4	Amendment	Justices may amend the Defaults in Records and Process after Judgment.	The whole chapter, in so far as it extends to Northern Ireland.
4 Hen. 6. c. 3	Amendment	Recital of the Statute 9 Hen. 5. St. 1, reciting Statute 14 Edw. 3. St. 1. c. 6, for amendment of Errors in process by misprision of clerks as well after judgment as before.	The whole chapter, in so far as it extends to Northern Ireland.
8 Hen. 6. c. 1	Privileges of Clergy Act 1492	The clergy of the Convocation and their servants shall have all such liberties as the lords and commons of Parliament.	The whole chapter, in so far as it extends to Northern Ireland.
8 Hen. 6. c. 12	Amendment Act 1429	No Judgment nor Record shall be reversed nor avoided for erasures, interlineations or literal errors.	The whole chapter, so far as unrepealed, in so far as it extends to Northern Ireland.
8 Hen. 6. c. 15	Amendment (No. 2) Act 1429	The Judges may amend records in cases of misprision of sheriffs, etc.	The whole chapter, in so far as it extends to Northern Ireland.
14 Hen. 6. c. 1	Judgment in Treason and Felony	Justices of Nisi Prius may give judgment, etc., in treason and felony cases.	The whole chapter, in so far as it extends to Northern Ireland.
24 Hen. 8. c. 12	Ecclesiastical Appeals Act 1532	The Ecclesiastical Appeals Act, 1532.	The whole act, in so far as it extends to Northern Ireland.
35 Hen. 8. c. 16	Canon Law Act 1543	An Act concerning the Examination of the Canon Laws by Two and thirty Persons to be named by the King's Majesty during His Highness's Life.	The whole act.
37 Hen. 8. c. 4	Dissolution of Colleges Act 1545	The Dissolution of Colleges Act, 1545.	In part, namely,— Sections thirteen and sixteen.
1 Edw. 6. c. 2	Election of Bishops Act 1547	An Acte for the election of Bisshoppes.	The whole act, in so far as it extends to Northern Ireland.
1 Edw. 6. c. 14	Dissolution of Colleges Act 1547	The Dissolution of Colleges Act, 1547.	In part, namely,— Section twenty-three.
2 & 3 Edw. 6. c. 1	Act of Uniformity 1548	The Act of Uniformity, 1548.	The whole act, in so far as it extends to Northern Ireland.
5 & 6 Edw. 6. c. 1	Act of Uniformity 1551	The Act of Uniformity, 1551.	The whole act, in so far as it extends to Northern Ireland.
5 & 6 Edw. 6. c. 16	Sale of Offices Act 1551	The Sale of Offices Act, 1551.	In part, namely,— Sections five and six, in so far as they extend to Northern Ireland.
1 Eliz. 1. c. 1	Act of Supremacy 1558	The Act of Supremacy.	In part, namely,— Section eight, in so far as it extends to Northern Ireland.
1 Eliz. 1. c. 2	Act of Uniformity 1558	The Act of Uniformity, 1558.	The whole act, in so far as it extends to Northern Ireland.
3 Cha. 1. c. 5	Continuance of Laws, etc. Act 1627	An Act for contynuance and Repeale of divers Statutes.	In part, namely,— In section twenty-two the words " an Act intituled, An Act for the increase of mariners, and for maintenance of navigation, repealing a former Act made in the three and twentieth year of her said Majesty's reign, bearing the same title," in so far as they extend to Northern Ireland.
16 Cha. 1. c. 4	Taxation (No. 3) Act 1640	An Act for the further releife of His Majesties Armie and the Northern Parts of the Kingdome.	In part, namely,— Section two so far as it relates to the continuation of 39 Eliz. c. 10. by 3 Car. 1. c. 5. in so far as it extends to Northern Ireland.
16 Cha. 1. c. 26	Impressment of Seamen (No. 3) Act 1640	An Act for the better raising and levying of Mariners, Sailers and others for the present guarding of the Seas and necessary defence of this realm and other His Majesties Dominions.	The whole act, in so far as it extends to Northern Ireland.
16 Cha. 1. c. 28	Impressment of Soldiers Act 1640	An Act for the better raising and leavying of Souldiers for the present defence of the Kingdomes of England and Ireland.	The whole act, in so far as it extends to Northern Ireland.
16 Cha. 1. c. 30	Relief of Ireland Act 1640	An Act for a speedie contribution and loan towards the releife of his Majesties distressed subjects of the Kingdome of Ireland.	The whole act, in so far as it extends to Northern Ireland.
16 Cha. 1. c. 32	Taxation (No. 8) Act 1640	An Act for the raising and leavying of Moneys for the necessary defence and great affaires of the Kingdomes of England and Ireland, and for the payment of debts undertaken by the Parliament.	The whole act, in so far as it extends to Northern Ireland.
16 Cha. 1. c. 33	Adventurers' Act 1640	An Act for the speedy and effectual reducing the rebels in His Majesty's Kingdom of Ireland to their due obedience to His Majesty and the Crown of England.	The whole act, in so far as it extends to Northern Ireland.
16 Cha. 1. c. 34	Lands of Irish Rebels (Adventurers' Subscriptions) Act 1640	An Act adding to and explaining certain clauses in Stat. 16 Car. 1. c. 33.	The whole act, in so far as it extends to Northern Ireland.
16 Cha. 1. c. 35	Lands of Irish Rebels (Adventurers' Subscriptions) (No. 2) Act 1640	An Act to enable Corporations and Bodies Politic to participate in the benefit of Stat. 16 Car. 1. c. 33.	The whole act, in so far as it extends to Northern Ireland.
16 Cha. 1. c. 37	Irish Rebels Act 1640	An Act for the further advancement of an Effective and Speedy reduction of the rebels in Ireland to the obedience of His Majesty and Crown of England.	The whole act, in so far as it extends to Northern Ireland.
13 Cha. 2. Stat. 1. c. 14	Confirmation of Acts (No. 3) Act 1661	An Act for Confirming an Act entituled an Act for encouraging and encreasing of Shipping and Navigation and severall other Acts both publique and private mentioned therein.	In part, namely,— The words " One other Act, intituled, An Act for prohibiting the exportation of wool, wool-fells, fullers earth or any kind of scouring earth ", and the words " One other Act, intituled, an Act for prohibiting the planting, setting or sowing of tobacco in England and Ireland " in so far as they extend to Northern Ireland.
14 Cha. 2. c. 4	Act of Uniformity 1662	The Act of Uniformity, 1662.	The whole act, in so far as it extends to Northern Ireland.
19 & 20 Cha. 2. c. 3	Prize Ships Act 1667	An Act to make Prize Ships free for trade.	The whole act, in so far as it extends to Northern Ireland.
22 & 23 Cha. 2. c. 26	Tobacco Planting and Plantation Trade Act 1670	An Act to prevent the planting of Tobacco in England, and for regulateing the Plantation Trade.	The whole act so far as unrepealed.
1 Will. & Mar. Sess. 2. c. 2	Bill of Rights 1689	The Bill of Rights.	In part, namely,— In the preamble the words " and jurors which passe upon men in trialls for high treason ought to be freeholders ", in so far as they extend to Northern Ireland.
12 & 13 Will. 3. c. 2	Act of Settlement 1701	The Act of Settlement.	In part, namely,— In section three from the words " That after the said limitation shall take effect as aforesaid, judges commissions " where those words secondly occur to the words " it may be lawful to remove them ", in so far as they extend to Northern Ireland.
1 Ann. c. 25	Crown Lands, Forfeited Estates (Ireland) Act 1702	An Act for making more effectual the provision out of the forfeited estates in Ireland, for the building of churches and augmenting small vicarages in Ireland.	The whole act, in so far as it extends to Northern Ireland.
1 Ann. Stat. 2. c. 18	Crown Lands, Forfeited Estates (Ireland) Act 1702	An Act for advancing the sale of the forfeited estates in Ireland, and for vesting such as remain unsold by the present trustees, in Her Majesty, her heirs and successors, for such uses, as the same were before vested in the said trustees; and for the more effectually selling and setting the said estates to protestants; and for explaining several Acts relating to the Lord Bophin, and Sir Redmond Everard.	The whole act so far as unrepealed, in so far as it extends to Northern Ireland.
6 Ann. c. 8	Maintenance of Church of England Act 1706	An Act for securing the Church of England as by law established.	The whole act, in so far as it extends to Northern Ireland.
6 Ann. c. 25	Crown Lands, Forfeited Estates (Ireland) Act 1706	An Act for making the Stats. 11 Will. 3. c. 2 and 1 Anne c. 25 more effectual for appropriating the forfeited impropriations in Ireland, for the building of churches, and augmenting poor vicarages there.	The whole act, in so far as it extends to Northern Ireland.
11 Geo. 1. c. 10	Stamford Bridge (Replacement and Tolls) Act 1724	An Act to enable the Justices of the Peace for the East-Riding of the County of York, to take down the County Bridge called Stanford Bridge, and to build a Stone Bridge at a more convenient Place over the River Darwent in the said Riding instead thereof.	The whole act.
15 Geo. 2. c. 18	Colchester (Poor Law Authority) Act 1741	An Act to render more effectual an Act made in the ninth and tenth Years of the Reign of his late Majesty King William the Third, intituled, An Act for erecting Hospitals and Workhouses within the Town of Colchester in the County of Essex, for the better employing and maintaining the Poor thereof.	The whole act.
20 Geo. 2. c. 40	Yarmouth Haven Act 1746	An Act to revive, continue and amend an Act made in the ninth Year of the Reign of his late Majesty King George the First, intituled, An Act for clearing, depthening, repairing, extending, maintaining and improving the Haven and Piers of Great Yarmouth; and for depthening and making more navigable the several rivers emptying themselves at the said town; and also for preserving ships wintering in the said Haven from accidents by fire.	The whole act.
26 Geo. 2. c. 6	Quarantine Act 1753	An Act to oblige ships more effectually to perform their quarentine; and for the better preventing the plague being brought from foreign parts into Great Britain or Ireland, or the Isles of Guernsey, Jersey, Alderney, Sark or Man.	The whole act, in so far as it extends to Northern Ireland.
29 Geo. 2. c. 8	Quarantine Act 1756	An Act to repeal a Clause in an Act made in the twenty-sixth year of His present Majesty intituled, An Act to oblige ships more effectually to perform their quarentine; and for the better preventing the plague being brought from foreign parts into Great Britain or Ireland or the Isles of Guernsey, Jersey, Alderney, Sark or Man, whereby the stationing of ships infected with the plague, to the northward of Cape Finisterre, is confined to the Harbour of New Grimsby, and removable to no other place; and for appointing a more safe and commodious place instead thereof.	The whole act, in so far as it extends to Northern Ireland.
31 Geo. 2. c. 46	Old Brentford Bridge (No. 2) Act 1757	An Act to amend an Act passed in the last Session of Parliament, intituled, An Act for building a Bridge or Bridges cross the River of Thames, from a certain Place in Old Brentford, in the Parish of Ealing, in the County of Middlesex, known by the Name of Smith or Smith's Hill, to the opposite Shore in the County of Surry.	The whole act.
16 Geo. 3. c. 23	Boston Pilotage Act 1776	An Act for the better Regulation and Government of the Pilots conducting Ships and Vessels into and out of the Port of Boston, in the County of Lincoln; and for affixing and setting down Mooring-Posts upon the Banks or High Marshes within or adjoining to the Haven and Harbour of the said Port; and for affixing and laying down Bridges over the Creeks upon the High Marshes within or adjoining to the said Haven and Harbour; and for preventing Mischiefs by Fire in the said Haven and Harbour.	The whole act.
17 Geo. 3. c. 12	Coalport Bridge over Severn (Tolls, etc.) Act 1776	An Act for building a Bridge across the River Severn, from or near a Place called Preen's-Eddy, in the Parish of Broseley, to or near a Place called the Sheep-Wash, in the Parish of Sutton-Maddock, in the County of Salop; and for making proper Roads and Avenues to and from the same.	The whole act.
26 Geo. 3. c. 115	Barking Act 1786	An Act for providing a proper Workhouse, and better regulating the Poor, within the Parish of Barking, in the County of Essex; and for regulating the Common Wharf within the Town of Barking.	The whole act so far as unrepealed.
27 Geo. 3. c. 48	East India Company (Warehouses) Act 1787	An Act to enable the East India Company to continue their Warehouses already built, and to build new Warehouses, exceeding certain dimensions, freed and discharged from the Regulations and Directions contained in an Act made in the fourteenth Year of the Reign of his Majesty King George the Third, intituled, An Act for the further and better Regulating of Buildings and Party Walls; and for the more effectually preventing Mischiefs by Fire within the Cities of London and Westminster, and the Liberties thereof, and other the Parishes, Precincts, and Places, within the Weekly Bills of Mortality, the Parishes of Saint Mary le Bon, Paddington, Saint Pancras, and Saint Luke at Chelsea, in the County of Middlesex, and for indemnifying, under certain Conditions, Builders and other Persons against the Penalties to which they are or may be liable for erecting Buildings within the Limits aforesaid contrary to Law.	The whole act.
31 Geo. 3. c. 31	Clergy Endowments (Canada) Act 1791	The Clergy Endowments (Canada) Act, 1791.	In part, namely,— Sections thirty-eight; thirty-nine and forty.
32 Geo. 3. c. 79	Boston Pilotage Act 1792	An Act for amending an Act, of the sixteenth year of his present Majesty, relating to the Haven and Harbour of Boston in the County of Lincoln; and for regulating the Mooring and Removing of Ships and other Vessels within the said Haven and Harbour, and for removing Obstructions therein.	The whole act.
41 Geo. 3. c. 25	Master of the Rolls (Ireland) Act 1801	The Master of the Rolls (Ireland) Act, 1801.	The whole act so far as unrepealed, in so far as it extends to Northern Ireland.
41 Geo. 3. c. 52	House of Commons (Disqualification) Act 1801	The House of Commons (Disqualification) Act, 1801.	In part, namely,— Section nine.
41 Geo. 3. c. 60	Composition for a Crown Debt Act 1801	An Act to explain and amend an Act passed in the Thirty-fourth Year of the Reign of his present Majesty, intituled, An Act to enable the Lords Commissioners of His Majesty's Treasury to ascertain what sum shall be paid into His Majesty's Exchequer, in full Satisfaction of the Debt due on the Mortgage made by the late John Gardner Kemeys, Esquire, in Trust for the late Right Honourable Richard Rigby, in case it shall appear to the said Lords Commissioners that it will be necessary to resort to the mortgaged Premises, in order to recover the Balance due from the said Richard Rigby to His Majesty.	The whole act.
41 Geo. 3. c. 85	Fines by Justices Act 1801	The Fines by Justices Act, 1801.	The whole act so far as unrepealed.
43 Geo. 3. c. 86	Unlawful Combinations (Ireland) Act 1803	The Unlawful Combinations (Ireland) Act, 1803.	In part, namely,— Section twenty-one.
44 Geo. 3. c. 77	Marriages Confirmation Act 1804	The Marriages Confirmation Act, 1804.	In part, namely,— Section two.
46 Geo. 3. c. 131	Lewis (Estates and Crown Claims) Act 1806	An Act for exonerating the Estates of Percival Lewis Esquire, and Marianne Lewis Spinster, in the Parish of Putney in the County of Surrey, from the Claims of His Majesty against the Estate of Edward Lewis Esquire, deceased.	The whole act.
46 Geo. 3. c. 157	Estates of Granada and Saint Vincent Traders Act 1806	An Act for more effectually carrying into Execution the Purposes of an Act made in the Thirty-ninth and Fortieth Year of His present Majesty, to give further Time for the Payment, on the Conditions therein mentioned, of Instalments on certain Loans advanced to the House of Alexander Houstoun and Company, to Charles Ashwell Esquire, and to William Johnstone Esquire, being Persons connected with and trading to the Islands of Grenada and Saint Vincent, so far as relates to the Real and Personal Estates of William Mac Dowall, James Mac Dowall, and Robert Houstoun Rae, in the West Indies and elsewhere, except in Scotland.	The whole act so far as unrepealed.
46 Geo. 3. c. 158	Estates of Granada and Saint Vincent Traders (Scotland) Act 1806	An Act for more effectually carrying into Execution the Purposes of an Act made in the Thirty-ninth and Fortieth Year of His present Majesty, to give further Time for the Payment, on the Conditions therein mentioned, of Instalments on certain Loans advanced to the House of Alexander Houstoun and Company, to Charles Ashwell Esquire, and to William Johnstone Esquire, being Persons connected with and trading to the Islands of Grenada and Saint Vincent, so far as relates to the Real and Personal Estates of William Mac Dowall, James Mac Dowall, and Robert Houstoun Rae Esquires, in Scotland.	The whole act.
47 Geo. 3. Sess. 2. c. 69	General de Lancey (Crown Claims) Act 1807	An Act for discharging from the Claims of the Crown, certain Real and Personal Estates belonging to General de Lancey, late Barrack Master General, and vested in Trustees for Sale.	The whole act.
48 Geo. 3. c. 135	Grenada and Saint Vincent Traders Act 1808	An Act to amend an Act made in the Forty-sixth Year of His present Majesty for more effectually carrying into Execution the Purposes of an Act made in the Thirty-ninth and Fortieth Year of His Majesty, to give further Time for the Payment, on the Conditions therein mentioned, of Instalments on certain Loans advanced to the House of Alexander Houstoun and Company to Charles Ashwell Esquire, and to William Johnstone Esquire, being Persons connected with and trading to the Islands of Grenada and St. Vincent, so far as relates to the Real and Personal Estates of William Mac Dowall, James Mac Dowall, and Robert Houstoun Rae, in the West Indies and elsewhere, except in Scotland.	The whole act.
48 Geo. 3. c. 145	Judges' Pensions (Scotland) Act 1808	An Act for enabling His Majesty to grant Annuities to the Judges of the Courts of Session, Justiciary, and Exchequer in Scotland upon the Resignation of their Offices.	In part, namely,— Section two.
51 Geo. 3. c. 102	General de Lancey (Estates and Crown Claims) Act 1811	An Act to extend the provisions of an Act passed in the Forty-seventh Year of His present Majesty, for discharging from the Claims of the Crown certain Real and Personal Estates belonging to General de Lancey, late Barrack Master General, and vested in Trust for Sale; and also for vesting and settling certain Lands heretofore contracted to be purchased by the said General de Lancey in Trustees, to be sold for Payment of a Debt due to the Crown, and for other Purposes relative thereto.	The whole act.
52 Geo. 3. c. 75	Crown Debt of Abraham Goldsmid, etc. Act 1812	An Act to provide for the more complete and effectual Liquidation of a Debt due to His Majesty from the late Abraham Goldsmid, Merchant, and his surviving Partners; and to confirm and establish certain Agreements entered into for that and other Purposes relating thereto.	The whole act.
52 Geo. 3. c. 131	Parochial Stipends (Scotland) Act 1812	The Parochial Stipends (Scotland) Act, 1812.	The whole act.
54 Geo. 3. c. 16	House of Commons (Disqualifications) Act 1813	The House of Commons (Disqualifications) Act, 1813.	The whole act.
54 Geo. 3. c. 95	Judges' Pensions (Ireland) Act 1814	An Act to enable His Majesty to grant additional Annuities to the Judges of the Court of King's Bench, Judges of the Courts of Common Pleas and Exchequer, in Ireland, on the Resignation of their offices.	The whole act in so far as it extends to Northern Ireland.
55 Geo. 3. c. 109	Prisoners from Clackmanan Act 1815	An Act to enable the Sheriff Depute or Substitute and Justices of the Peace of the County of Clackmanan, to incarcerate Persons in the Gaol of the Royal Burgh of Stirling or the Common Gaol of the County of Stirling.	The whole act.
55 Geo. 3. c. 184	Stamp Act 1815	The Stamp Act, 1815.	In part, namely,— Sections twenty-one and twenty-two.
55 Geo. 3. c. 195	Government Contractors Act 1815	An Act for exonerating the Estates and Effects of the late Sir James Colebrooke, the late Sir George Colebrooke, Arnold Nesbit, Sir Samuel Fludyer, Adam Drummond and Moses Franks, and of their Sureties, from all Claims and Demands whatsoever in respect of any Contracts entered into with His Majesty's Government.	The whole act.
57 Geo. 3. c. 91	Clerks of the Peace (Fees) Act 1817	The Clerks of the Peace (Fees) Act, 1817.	In part, namely,— Section two.
58 Geo. 3. c. 42	Crown Lands at Yarmouth Act 1818	An Act for enabling the Trustees of certain Premises at Great Yarmouth in the County of Norfolk, held in Trust for His Majesty, to execute a Conveyance of the same to a Purchaser thereof.	The whole act.
59 Geo. 3. c. 12	Poor Law Relief Act 1819	The Poor Law Relief Act, 1819.	In part, namely,— Sections nineteen; twenty; twenty-one; twenty-two and twenty-three. Section thirty-five from " and all Acts " to " major part of them."
59 Geo. 3. c. 45	Court of Session Act 1819	The Court of Session Act, 1819.	In part, namely,— Sections two; four and five.
59 Geo. 3. c. 68	Exoneration from a Crown Debt Act 1819	An Act for exonerating the Manor of Dawlish in the County of Devon, from the Claims of the Crown against the Estate of John Inglett Fortescue Esquire.	The whole act.
59 Geo. 3. c. 95	Poor Relief (No. 2) Act 1819	The Poor Relief (No. 2) Act, 1819.	The whole act.
59 Geo. 3. c. 137	Sale of Certain Lands in Worcester Act 1819	An Act to enable the Directors of the Poor of the several Parishes within the City of Worcester, and of the Parishes united therewith, to sell and dispose of certain Lands, discharged of all Claims of the Crown in respect of any Forfeiture incurred under the Statutes of Mortmain.	The whole act.
1 Geo. 4. c. 36	Poor Law (Appeals) Act 1820	The Poor Law (Appeals) Act, 1820.	The whole act.
1 Geo. 4. c. 42	Composition for a Crown Debt Act 1820	An Act to authorise the Composition for the Debt remaining due to His Majesty from the late Abraham Goldsmid Merchant, and his surviving Partners.	The whole act.
1 Geo. 4. c. 101	Divorce Bills Evidence Act 1820	The Divorce Bills Evidence Act, 1820.	The whole act.
1 Geo. 4. c. 114	Caversham Rectory Act 1820	An Act for enabling William Blackall Simonds Esquire to sell or mortgage his Estate and Interest in the Impropriate Rectory of Caversham in the County of Oxford, free from the Claims of the Crown.	The whole act.
1 & 2 Geo. 4. c. 66	British North America Act 1821	The British North America Act, 1821.	The whole act so far as unrepealed.
1 & 2 Geo. 4. c. 86	Caversham Rectory Act 1821	An Act for amending an Act passed in the First Year of His present Majesty, for enabling William Blackall Simonds Esquire, to sell or mortgage his Estate and Interest in the Impropriate Rectory of Caversham, in the County of Oxford, free from the Claims of the Crown.	The whole act.
3 Geo. 4. c. 126	Turnpike Roads Act 1822	The Turnpike Roads Act, 1822.	In part, namely,— Section thirty-two.
4 Geo. 4. c. 19	National Debt Reduction Act 1823	The National Debt Reduction Act, 1823.	In part, namely,— Section twelve.
4 Geo. 4. c. 61	Court of Chancery (Ireland) Act 1823	The Court of Chancery (Ireland) Act, 1823.	In part, namely,— Section fifty-nine, in so far as it extends to Northern Ireland.
4 Geo. 4. c. 80	Lascars Act 1823	The Lascars Act, 1823.	In part, namely,— Sections twenty-five; twenty-six and twenty-eight.
4 Geo. 4. c. 97	Commissary Courts (Scotland) Act 1823	The Commissary Courts (Scotland) Act, 1823.	The whole act so far as unrepealed.
5 Geo. 4. c. 5	Post Office Buildings Act 1824	An Act for enabling a Conveyance to be made of Part of a House in Lombard Street, vested in the Right Honourable Henry Frederick Lord Carteret, formerly His Majesty's Postmaster General.	The whole act.
5 Geo. 4. c. 12	Gaol Sessions Act 1824	The Gaol Sessions Act, 1824.	The whole act so far as unrepealed.
5 Geo. 4. c. 83	Vagrancy Act 1824	The Vagrancy Act, 1824.	In part, namely,— Section fifteen.
5 Geo. 4. c. 84	Transportation Act 1824	The Transportation Act, 1824.	In part, namely,— Section twenty-three.
6 Geo. 4. c. 81	Excise Licenses Act 1825	The Excise Licenses Act, 1825.	In part, namely,— Section five.
6 Geo. 4. c. 120	Court of Session Act 1825	The Court of Session Act, 1825.	In part, namely,— Sections three and thirty-seven.
7 Geo. 4. c. 12	Lands of Dallas (Receiver-General) Act 1826	An Act for exonerating a certain Estate called Maes Llemystin, situate in the Parish of Llangadfan, in the County of Montgomery, belonging to Charles Dallas Esquire, from the Claims of the Crown.	The whole act.
7 Geo. 4. c. 28	Lands of Tilson (Receiver-General) Act 1826	An Act for exonerating certain Estates called Corsica Hall, Alfriston, Mass Alfriston otherwise Masse Alfryshton, and Dean Place, in the County of Sussex; belonging to John Henry Tilson Esquire, from the Claims of the Crown.	The whole act.
7 Geo. 4. c. 46	Country Bankers Act 1826	The Country Bankers Act, 1826.	In part, namely,— Sections sixteen and seventeen.
7 Geo. 4. c. 64	Criminal Law Act 1826	The Criminal Law Act, 1826.	In part, namely,— Section one. Sections five and six. Section seventeen.
7 & 8 Geo. 4. c. 53	Excise Management Act 1827	The Excise Management Act, 1827.	In part, namely,— Sections thirty-eight and one hundred and seven.
9 Geo. 4. c. 23	Bank Notes Act 1828	The Bank Notes Act, 1828.	The whole act so far as unrepealed.
9 Geo. 4. c. 39	Salmon Fisheries (Scotland) Act 1828	The Salmon Fisheries (Scotland) Act, 1828.	In part, namely,— Section ten.
10 Geo. 4. c. 7	Roman Catholic Relief Act 1829	The Roman Catholic Relief Act, 1829.	In part, namely,— In section twelve the words " or Ireland."
11 Geo. 4 & 1 Will. 4. c. 26	National Debt Act 1830	The National Debt Act, 1830.	The whole act so far as unrepealed.
11 Geo. 4 & 1 Will. 4. c. 51	Beer Licenses Act 1830	The Beer Licenses Act, 1830.	In part, namely,— Sections twenty-three and twenty-four.
11 Geo. 4 & 1 Will. 4. c. 69	Court of Session Act 1830	The Court of Session Act, 1830.	In part, namely,— Section thirty so far as unrepealed.
2 & 3 Will. 4. c. 64	Parliamentary Boundaries Act 1832	The Parliamentary Boundaries Act, 1832.	The whole act so far as unrepealed.
2 & 3 Will. 4. c. 65	Representation of the People (Scotland) Act 1832	The Representation of the People (Scotland) Act, 1832.	In part, namely,— Section thirty so far as unrepealed.
2 & 3 Will. 4. c. 89	Parliamentary Boundaries (Ireland) Act 1832	The Parliamentary Boundaries (Ireland) Act, 1832.	The whole act so far as unrepealed.
2 & 3 Will. 4. c. 116	Lord Lieutenants' and Lord Chancellors' Salaries (Ireland) Act 1832	The Lord Lieutenants' and Lord Chancellors' Salaries (Ireland) Act, 1832.	In part, namely,— Section one.
2 & 3 Will. 4. c. 127	Land Tax Commissioners (Appointment) Act 1832	An Act for appointing additional Commissioners to put in execution the Acts for granting an Aid to His Majesty by a Land Tax, and continuing the Duties on Personal Estates, Offices and Pensions.	The whole act.
3 & 4 Will. 4. c. 86	Crown Lands Act 1833	The Crown Lands Act, 1833.	The whole act.
3 & 4 Will. 4. c. 87	Inclosure Act 1833	The Inclosure Act, 1833.	The whole act.
3 & 4 Will. 4. c. 93	China Trade Act 1833	The China Trade Act, 1833.	The whole act so far as unrepealed.
3 & 4 Will. 4. c. 95	Land Tax Commissioners (Appointment) Act 1833	An Act to appoint additional Commissioners for executing the Acts for granting an Aid by a Land Tax, and for continuing the Duties on Personal Estates, Offices and Pensions.	The whole act.
4 & 5 Will. 4. c. 19	House Tax Act 1834	The House Tax Act, 1834.	The whole act so far as unrepealed.
4 & 5 Will. 4. c. 24	Superannuation Act 1834	The Superannuation Act, 1834.	In part, namely,— Section nine.
4 & 5 Will. 4. c. 36	Central Criminal Court Act 1834	The Central Criminal Court Act, 1834.	In part, namely,— Sections five and eleven.
4 & 5 Will. 4. c. 75	Excise Act 1834	The Excise Act, 1834.	The whole act so far as unrepealed.
4 & 5 Will. 4. c. 76	Poor Law Amendment Act 1834	The Poor Law Amendment Act, 1834.	In part, namely,— Section eighty-six the words " or appointment of any officer " and from " nor the appointment " to " the poor rate ".
5 & 6 Will. 4. c. 42	Insolvency Courts Act 1835	The Insolvency Courts Act, 1835.	The whole act.
5 & 6 Will. 4. c. 50	Highway Act 1835	The Highway Act, 1835.	In part, namely,— Sections forty-two and forty-three.
5 & 6 Will. 4. c. 72	Excise Incorporation (Scotland) Act 1835	An Act for abolishing the Excise Incorporation in Scotland, and for transferring the Funds of the said Incorporation to the Consolidated Fund, and providing for the Payment of the Annuities to the Widows and Orphans of late and present Members of the Incorporation Fund.	The whole act.
6 & 7 Will. 4. c. 80	Land Tax Commissioners (Appointment) Act 1836	An Act to appoint additional Commissioners for executing the Acts for granting an Aid by a Land Tax, and for continuing the Duties on Personal Estates, Offices and Pensions.	The whole act.
7 Will. 4 & 1 Vict. c. 15	Trent and Markham Bridges Act 1837	An Act to discharge His Majesty's Manor and Demesne Lands at Newark in the County of Nottingham from any Costs of rebuilding or repairing Trent and Markham Bridges, and to charge the same on the other Hereditary Revenues of the Crown.	The whole act.
7 Will. 4 & 1 Vict. c. 60	Acts of Parliament (Mistaken References) Act 1837	The Acts of Parliament (Mistaken References) Act, 1837.	The whole act.
7 Will. 4 & 1 Vict. c. 67	Master and Workmen (Arbitration) Act 1837	The Master and Workmen (Arbitration) Act, 1837.	The whole act.
1 & 2 Vict. c. 57	Land Tax Commissioners (Appointment) Act 1838	An Act to appoint additional Commissioners for executing the Acts granting a Land Tax and Duties on Personal Estates, Offices and Pensions.	The whole act.
1 & 2 Vict. c. 94	Public Record Office Act 1838	The Public Record Office Act, 1838.	In part, namely,— Section nine the proviso.
1 & 2 Vict. c. 95	Pensions Act 1838	The Pensions Act, 1838.	The whole act so far as unrepealed.
1 & 2 Vict. c. 106	Pluralities Act 1838	The Pluralities Act, 1838.	In part, namely,— Section forty.
1 & 2 Vict. c. 110	Judgments Act 1838	The Judgments Act, 1838.	In part, namely,— Section twenty-one so far as unrepealed.
2 & 3 Vict. c. 11	Judgments Act 1839	An Act for the better Protection of Purchasers against Judgments, Crown Debts, Lis Pendens, and Fiats in Bankruptcy.	The whole act so far as unrepealed.
2 & 3 Vict. c. 71	Metropolitan Police Courts Act 1839	The Metropolitan Police Courts Act, 1839.	In part, namely,— Section seventeen.
2 & 3 Vict. c. 82	Counties (Detached Parts) Act 1839	The Counties (Detached Parts) Act, 1839.	In part, namely,— The whole act so far as unrepealed.
2 & 3 Vict. c. 84	Poor Rate Act 1839	The Poor Rate Act, 1839.	In part, namely,— Section two.
3 & 4 Vict. c. 92	Non-Parochial Registers Act 1840	The Non-Parochial Registers Act, 1840.	In part, namely,— Section two.
5 & 6 Vict. c. 22	Queen's Prison Act 1842	An Act for Consolidating the Queen's Bench, Fleet and Marshalsea Prisons, and for regulating the Queen's Prison.	The whole act so far as unrepealed.
7 & 8 Vict. c. 79	Land Tax Commissions Act 1844	An Act to appoint additional Commissioners for executing the Acts for granting a Land Tax and for other Rates and Taxes.	The whole act.
7 & 8 Vict. c. 92	Coroners Act 1844	The Coroners Act, 1844.	In part, namely,— Section six.
7 & 8 Vict. c. 101	Poor Law Amendment Act 1844	The Poor Law Amendment Act, 1844.	In part, namely,— Section seventy-four from " and the words ' licensed Minister ' " to the end of the section.
8 & 9 Vict. c. 118	Inclosure Act 1845	The Inclosure Act, 1845.	In part, namely,— Section three so far as unrepealed. Section one hundred and sixty-three to " of this Act, and ".
8 & 9 Vict. c. 127	Small Debts Act 1845	The Small Debts Act, 1845.	In part, namely,— Section thirteen.
11 & 12 Vict. c. 12	Treason Felony Act 1848	The Treason Felony Act, 1848.	In part, namely,— Section five.
11 & 12 Vict. c. 42	Indictable Offences Act 1848	The Indictable Offences Act, 1848.	In part, namely,— Section seven. Section twenty-two. Section thirty-one from " without possessing " to " behalf and ".
11 & 12 Vict. c. 44	Justices Protection Act 1848	The Justices Protection Act, 1848.	In part, namely,— Section eighteen.
11 & 12 Vict. c. 62	Land Tax Commissioners Act 1848	An Act to appoint additional Commissioners for executing the Acts for granting a Land Tax and other Rates and Taxes.	The whole act.
12 & 13 Vict. c. 25	Portuguese Deserters Act 1849	The Portuguese Deserters Act, 1849.	The whole act so far as unrepealed.
13 & 14 Vict. c. 89	Court of Chancery (Ireland) Regulation Act 1850	The Court of Chancery (Ireland) Regulation Act, 1850.	The whole act so far as unrepealed.
14 & 15 Vict. c. 55	Criminal Justice Administration Act 1851	The Criminal Justice Administration Act, 1851.	In part, namely,— Sections fifteen and sixteen.
14 & 15 Vict. c. 64	Railway Regulation Act 1851	The Railway Regulation Act, 1851.	In part, namely,— Section two.
14 & 15 Vict. c. 86	New Zealand Settlements Act 1851	An Act to regulate the Affairs of certain Settlements established by the New Zealand Company in New Zealand.	The whole act.
14 & 15 Vict. c. 100	Criminal Procedure Act 1851	The Criminal Procedure Act, 1851.	In part, namely,— Section twenty-nine, in so far as it extends to Northern Ireland.
15 & 16 Vict. c. 39	Crown Revenue (Colonies) Act 1852	The Crown Revenue (Colonies) Act, 1852.	The whole act.
15 & 16 Vict. c. 56	Pharmacy Act 1852	The Pharmacy Act, 1852.	In part, namely,— Section six.
15 & 16 Vict. c. 76	Common Law Procedure Act 1852	The Common Law Procedure Act, 1852.	In part, namely,— Section one hundred and eight the proviso. Section one hundred and ten. Section one hundred and thirty-two.
15 & 16 Vict. c. 79	Inclosure Act 1852	The Inclosure Act, 1852.	In part, namely,— Section two.
16 & 17 Vict. c. 73	Naval Volunteers Act 1853	The Naval Volunteers Act, 1853.	In part, namely,— Sections one to twelve. Section seventeen from " every volunteer during " to " such volunteer, and to "; from " and to all officers " to " actual service "; the words " volunteers and " and the word " volunteer " where next occurring. Sections eighteen to twenty. Section twenty-one the words " any volunteer under this Act or ". Section twenty-two the words, " any volunteer under this Act or ", the words " any such volunteer or " and the words " any such volunteer ".
16 & 17 Vict. c. 111	Land Tax Commissioners (Appointment) Act 1853	An Act to appoint additional Commissioners for executing the Acts for granting a Land Tax and other Rates and Taxes.	The whole act.
16 & 17 Vict. c. 129	Pilotage Amendment Act 1853	The Pilotage Amendment Act, 1853.	In part, namely,— Sections three so far as unrepealed; four; five; eight and nine so far as unrepealed. Section ten from " either in respect of surplus duties " to " claims as hereinafter provided for " except the word " shall " in the middle of this passage. Section eleven. Section twelve to " subject to the charges aforesaid "; the words " after this Act comes into operation " and from " or of the poundage upon the sums " to the end of the section. Section thirteen to " Be it enacted that, for the purpose of carrying the said intention and provisions into effect "; and from " for altering and determining the payments " to " and the said Trinity House may also with such consent as aforesaid from time to time make regulations ".
16 & 17 Vict. c. 131	Merchant Shipping Law (Amendment) Act 1853	The Merchant Shipping Law (Amendment) Act, 1853.	In part, namely,— Sections twelve and twenty-eight.
17 & 18 Vict. c. 56	Friendly Societies Discharge Act 1854	The Friendly Societies Discharge Act, 1854.	The whole act so far as unrepealed.
17 & 18 Vict. c. 82	Court of Chancery of Lancaster Act 1854	The Court of Chancery of Lancaster Act, 1854.	In part, namely,— Sections one; six and ten.
17 & 18 Vict. c. 120	Merchant Shipping (Repeal) Act 1854	The Merchant Shipping (Repeal) Act, 1854.	In part, namely,— Section six. Section eight.
18 & 19 Vict. c. 17	Sardinia Loan Act 1855	The Sardinia Loan Act, 1855.	The whole act.
18 & 19 Vict. c. 115	General Board of Health Continuance Act 1855	The General Board of Health Continuance Act, 1855.	The whole act so far as unrepealed.
18 & 19 Vict. c. 120	Metropolis Management Act 1855	The Metropolis Management Act, 1855.	In part, namely,— Sections two hundred and thirteen and two hundred and fourteen.
19 & 20 Vict. c. 39	Sardinia Loan Act 1856	The Sardinia Loan Act, 1856.	The whole act.
19 & 20 Vict. c. 45	St. Mary Magdalen Hospital, Bath Act 1856	An Act for confirming a Scheme of the Charity Commissioners for Saint Mary Magdalen Hospital near Bath.	The whole act.
19 & 20 Vict. c. 46	Imprisonment (Scotland) Act 1856	The Imprisonment (Scotland) Act,, 1856.	The whole act.
19 & 20 Vict. c. 92	Chancery Appeal Court (Ireland) Act 1856	The Chancery Appeal Court (Ireland) Act, 1856.	In part, namely,— Sections nineteen and twenty, in so far as they extend to Northern Ireland.
19 & 20 Vict. c. 119	Marriage and Registration Act 1856	The Marriage and Registration Act, 1856.	In part, namely,— Section one.
20 & 21 Vict. c. 10	Borough of Hanley Act 1857	An Act to amend the Charter of Incorporation granted to the Borough of Hanley in the County of Stafford.	The whole act.
20 & 21 Vict. c. 46	Land Tax Commissioners (Appointment) Act 1857	An Act to appoint additional Commissioners for executing the Acts for granting a Land Tax and other Rates and Taxes.	The whole act.
20 & 21 Vict. c. 51	New Zealand Loan Guarantee Act 1857	The New Zealand Loan Guarantee Act, 1857.	The whole act.
20 & 21 Vict. c. 71	Lunacy (Scotland) Act 1857	The Lunacy (Scotland) Act, 1857.	In part, namely,— Section eighty-four so far as unrepealed.
20 & 21 Vict. c. 72	Police (Scotland) Act 1857	The Police (Scotland) Act, 1857.	In part, namely,— Section eighteen the words " or in the militia ".
20 & 21 Vict. c. 79	Probates and Letters of Administration Act (Ireland) 1857	The Probates and Letters of Administration Act (Ireland), 1857.	In part, namely,— Section twelve, so far as unrepealed; section ninety-six; section ninety-seven, so far as unrepealed and section one hundred and one.
20 & 21 Vict. c. 85	Matrimonial Causes Act 1857	The Matrimonial Causes Act, 1857.	In part, namely,— Section forty-four. Section forty-nine.
21 & 22 Vict. c. 50	Ecclesiastical Jurisdiction Act 1858	The Ecclesiastical Jurisdiction Act, 1858.	The whole act.
21 & 22 Vict. c. 97	Public Health Act 1858	The Public Health Act, 1858.	In part, namely,— Section four.
22 Vict. c. 26	Superannuation Act 1859	The Superannuation Act, 1859.	In part, namely,— Section fourteen.
22 & 23 Vict. c. 4	Middlesex Sessions Act 1859	The Middlesex Sessions Act, 1859.	In part, namely,— Section four from " and the said justices " to the end of the section.
22 & 23 Vict. c. 9	Chief Superintendent in China Act 1859	The Chief Superintendent in China Act, 1859.	The whole act.
22 & 23 Vict. c. 26	North-Western Territories of America Act 1859	An Act to make further Provision for the Regulation of the Trade with the Indians, and for the Administration of Justice in the North-Western Territories of America.	The whole act.
22 & 23 Vict. c. 31	Court of Probate Act (Ireland) 1859	The Court of Probate Act (Ireland), 1859.	In part, namely,— Section eleven, section thirteen, section twenty-three and section thirty-three, in so far as those sections extend to Northern Ireland.
23 & 24 Vict. c. 113	Excise Act 1860	The Excise Act, 1860.	In part, namely,— Section thirty-three so far as unrepealed.
23 & 24 Vict. c. 126	Common Law Procedure Act 1860	The Common Law Procedure Act, 1860.	The whole act so far as unrepealed.
23 & 24 Vict. c. 129	Excise on Spirits Act 1860	The Excise on Spirits Act, 1860.	The whole act so far as unrepealed.
24 & 25 Vict. c. 37	Poor Law (Scotland) No. 2 Act 1861	The Poor Law (Scotland) No. 2 Act, 1861.	The whole act so far as unrepealed.
24 & 25 Vict. c. 47	Harbours and Passing Tolls, etc. Act 1861	The Harbours and Passing Tolls, etc. Act, 1861.	In part, namely,— Section eight.
24 & 25 Vict. c. 95	Criminal Statutes Repeal Act 1861	An Act to repeal certain Enactments which have been consolidated in several Acts of the present Session relating to indictable offences and other matters.	The whole act.
24 & 25 Vict. c. 112	Birkenhead Enfranchisement Act 1861	An Act for the Appropriation of the Seats vacated by the Disfranchisement of the Boroughs of Sudbury and Saint Alban.	The whole act so far as unrepealed.
25 & 26 Vict. c. 39	Red Sea and India Telegraph Act 1862	The Red Sea and India Telegraph Act, 1862.	The whole act.
25 & 26 Vict. c. 102	Metropolis Management Amendment Act 1862	The Metropolis Management Amendment Act, 1862.	In part, namely,— Sections one; three; four; seventeen; thirty; seventy-nine; one hundred and fifteen and schedule B.
26 & 27 Vict. c. 14	Post Office Savings Bank Act 1863	The Post Office Savings Bank Act, 1863.	In part, namely,— Section four.
26 & 27 Vict. c. 61	Highway Act 1863	The Highway Act, 1863.	The whole act.
26 & 27 Vict. c. 65	Volunteer Act 1863	The Volunteer Act, 1863.	The whole act so far as unrepealed except sections one and two. Section two the words " under this Act ", and from " and offering their services " to the end of the section.
26 & 27 Vict. c. 70	Public Works (Manufacturing Districts) Act 1863	The Public Works (Manufacturing Districts) Act, 1863.	The whole act.
26 & 27 Vict. c. 82	Church Services (Wales) Act 1863	The Church Services (Wales) Act, 1863.	The whole act.
26 & 27 Vict. c. 94	Annual Turnpike Acts Continuance Act 1863	An Act to amend the Law relating to the Repair of Turnpike Roads in England and to continue certain Turnpike Acts in Great Britain.	The whole act so far as unrepealed.
26 & 27 Vict. c. 105	Promissory Notes Act 1863	The Promissory Notes Act, 1863.	In part, namely,— Section two.
26 & 27 Vict. c. 112	Telegraph Act 1863	The Telegraph Act, 1863.	In part, namely,— Section sixteen.
27 & 28 Vict. c. 23	Naval Prize Acts Repeal Act 1864	An Act to repeal certain Enactments relating to Naval Prize of War and Matters connected therewith or with the Discipline or Management of the Navy.	The whole act.
27 & 28 Vict. c. 32	Banking Copartnership Act 1864	The Banking Copartnership Act, 1864.	The whole act.
27 & 28 Vict. c. 40	Greek Loan Act 1864	The Greek Loan Act, 1864.	The whole act.
27 & 28 Vict. c. 104	Public Works (Manufacturing Districts) Act 1864	The Public Works (Manufacturing Districts) Act, 1864.	The whole act.
28 & 29 Vict. c. 37	County of Sussex Act 1865	The County of Sussex Act, 1865.	In part, namely,— Section thirteen.
28 & 29 Vict. c. 40	Lancaster Palatine Court Act 1865	The Lancaster Palatine Court Act, 1865.	The whole act.
28 & 29 Vict. c. 48	Courts of Justice Building Act 1865	The Courts of Justice Building Act, 1865.	In part, namely,— Sections five to fifteen and so far as unrepealed section seventeen.
28 & 29 Vict. c. 107	Annual Turnpike Acts Continuance Act 1865	The Annual Turnpike Acts Continuance Act, 1865.	In part, namely,— Section three.
28 & 29 Vict. c. 112	Admiralty, &c. Acts Repeal Act 1865	An Act to repeal Enactments relating to Powers of the Commissioners of the Admiralty, and to various Matters under the Control of the Admiralty.	The whole act.
28 & 29 Vict. c. 126	Prison Act 1865	The Prison Act, 1865.	In part, namely,— Section twenty.
29 & 30 Vict. c. 25	Exchequer Bills and Bonds Act 1866	The Exchequer Bills and Bonds Act, 1866.	In part, namely,— Section three the proviso, so far as unrepealed.
29 & 30 Vict. c. 52	Prosecution Expenses Act 1866	The Prosecution Expenses Act, 1866.	The whole act.
29 & 30 Vict. c. 59	Land Tax Commissioners (Appointment) Act 1866	An Act to appoint additional Commissioners for executing the Acts for granting a Land Tax and other Rates and Taxes.	The whole act.
29 & 30 Vict. c. 62	Crown Lands Act 1866	The Crown Lands Act, 1866.	In part, namely,— Section thirty.
29 & 30 Vict. c. 68	Superannuation Act 1866	The Superannuation Act, 1866.	In part, namely,— Section three from " any officer who " to " as regards ". Section six.
29 & 30 Vict. c. 104	New Zealand Loans Act 1866	The New Zealand Loans Act, 1866.	The whole act so far as unrepealed.
30 & 31 Vict. c. 3	British North America Act 1867	The British North America Act, 1867.	In part, namely,— Section one hundred and eighteen.
30 & 31 Vict. c. 16	Canada Railway Loan Act 1867	The Canada Railway Loan Act, 1867.	The whole act so far as unrepealed.
30 & 31 Vict. c. 44	Chancery (Ireland) Act 1867	The Chancery (Ireland) Act, 1867.	In part, namely,— Sections four; seven; eight; nine; twenty-one and twenty-two, in so far as they extend to Northern Ireland.
30 & 31 Vict. c. 51	Land Tax Commissioners Act 1867	An Act to appoint additional Commissioners for executing the Acts for granting a Land Tax and other Rates and Taxes.	The whole act.
30 & 31 Vict. c. 106	Poor Law Amendment Act 1867	The Poor Law Amendment Act, 1867.	The whole act so far as unrepealed.
30 & 31 Vict. c. 128	War Department Stores Act 1867	The War Department Stores Act, 1867.	The whole act so far as unrepealed.
31 & 32 Vict. c. 50	Lanark Prisons Act 1868	The Lanark Prisons Act, 1868.	The whole act so far as unrepealed.
31 & 32 Vict. c. 64	Land Registers (Scotland) Act 1868	The Land Registers (Scotland) Act, 1868.	In part, namely,— Section seventeen.
31 & 32 Vict. c. 81	Portpatrick, etc., Railways Act 1868	An Act to authorize Loans of Public Money to the Portpatrick and the Belfast and County Down Railway Companies, and a Payment to the Portpatrick Company in consequence of the Abandonment of the Communication between Donaghadee and Portpatrick.	The whole act.
31 & 32 Vict. c. 101	Titles to Land Consolidation (Scotland) Act 1868	The Titles to Land Consolidation (Scotland) Act, 1868.	In part, namely,— Section thirty-nine.
31 & 32 Vict. c. 116	Larceny Act 1868	The Larceny Act, 1868.	The whole act so far as unrepealed.
31 & 32 Vict. c. 120	West Indies (Salaries) Act 1868	The West Indies (Salaries) Act, 1868.	The whole act so far as unrepealed.
31 & 32 Vict. c. 122	Poor Law Amendment Act 1868	The Poor Law Amendment Act, 1868.	In part, namely,— Sections thirty-nine and forty so far as unrepealed.
31 & 32 Vict. c. 126	Danube Works Loan Act 1868	The Danube Works Loan Act, 1868.	The whole act.
32 & 33 Vict. c. 44	Greenwich Hospital Act 1869	The Greenwich Hospital Act, 1869.	In part, namely,— Section fourteen.
32 & 33 Vict. c. 60	Political Offices Pension Act 1869	The Political Offices Pension Act, 1869.	In part, namely,— Section nine subsections two and three, and the schedule.
32 & 33 Vict. c. 64	Land Tax Commissioners (Appointment) Act 1869	An Act to appoint additional Commissioners for executing the Acts for granting a Land Tax and other rates and taxes.	The whole act.
32 & 33 Vict. c. 69	Jamaica Loans Act 1869	The Jamaica Loans Act, 1869.	The whole act so far as unrepealed.
32 & 33 Vict. c. 70	Contagious Diseases (Animals) Act 1869	The Contagious Diseases (Animals) Act, 1869.	In part, namely,— Section one hundred and one.
32 & 33 Vict. c. 84	Durham Chancery Act 1869	An Act to abolish the office of Cursitor of the Court of Chancery in the palatine of Durham.	The whole act.
32 & 33 Vict. c. 101	Canada (Rupert's Land) Loan Act 1869	The Canada (Rupert's Land) Loan Act, 1869.	The whole act.
33 & 34 Vict. c. 40	New Zealand (Roads, etc.) Loan Act 1870	The New Zealand (Roads, etc.) Loan Act, 1870.	The whole act so far as unrepealed.
33 & 34 Vict. c. 46	Landlord and Tenant (Ireland) Act 1870	The Landlord and Tenant (Ireland) Act, 1870.	In part, namely,— In sections forty-four and forty-five the words from the beginning to " in the term of thirty-five years "; sections forty-six; forty-seven and fifty-four.
33 & 34 Vict. c. 63	Wages Arrestment Limitation (Scotland) Act 1870	The Wages Arrestment Limitation (Scotland) Act, 1870.	In part, namely,— Section three.
33 & 34 Vict. c. 71	National Debt Act 1870	The National Debt Act, 1870.	In part, namely,— Section five to " the respective amounts thereof subsisting at the passing of this Act, and "; the words " due to the several persons who at the passing of this Act are entitled thereto, and their representatives "; the words from " All the annuities " in the first place in which those words occur, to " therein mentioned "; and the words " at the periods and in the manner in the same Schedule mentioned ". Sections seven; eight; nine; ten; seventeen and nineteen. Section twenty-seven to " annuities. But "; and the words " other " and " also ". Section thirty-two the words " or some person deriving title from him by devolution in law as in this part of this Act mentioned " and the words " and on his bankruptcy his assignee, and on the marriage of the nominee being a female, her husband ". Section thirty-seven. Section thirty-nine paragraph five, the words " or bankruptcy " and the words " or of the marriage of the nominee being a female ". Section sixty-nine. Section seventy-three the words " receipt of dividends and "; and the words " and to receipt of dividends on stock standing in the names of infants or persons of unsound mind ". Schedule one, all the denominations except the last; the second and third columns; the regulation. Schedule three.
33 & 34 Vict. c. 73	Annual Turnpike Acts Continuance Act 1870	The Annual Turnpike Acts Continuance Act, 1870.	In part, namely,— Section thirteen.
33 & 34 Vict. c. 85	Norfolk Boundary Act 1870	The Norfolk Boundary Act, 1870.	The whole act.
33 & 34 Vict. c. 99	Inland Revenue Repeal Act 1870	An Act for the repeal of certain Enactments relating to the Inland Revenue.	The whole act.
34 & 35 Vict. c. 57	Courts of Justice (Additional Site) Act 1871	The Courts of Justice (Additional Site) Act, 1871.	In part, namely,— Section six.
34 & 35 Vict. c. 78	Regulation of Railways Act 1871	The Regulation of Railways Act, 1871.	In part, namely,— Section thirteen.
34 & 35 Vict. c. 86	Regulation of the Forces Act 1871	The Regulation of the Forces Act, 1871.	In part, namely,— Sections three; four; five; ten; eleven; twelve and thirteen.
35 & 36 Vict. c. 20	Customs and Inland Revenue Act 1872	The Customs and Inland Revenue Act, 1872.	The whole act so far as unrepealed.
35 & 36 Vict. c. 32	Landlord and Tenant (Ireland) Act 1872	The Landlord and Tenant (Ireland) Act, 1872.	In part, namely,— Section one subsections one, two and three.
35 & 36 Vict. c. 68	Military Forces Localization Act 1872	The Military Forces Localization Act, 1872.	In part, namely,— Sections five; six; seven; eight so far as unrepealed and nine.
35 & 36 Vict. c. 73	Merchant Shipping Act 1872	The Merchant Shipping Act, 1872.	In part, namely,— Section ten.
36 & 37 Vict. c. 15	New Zealand (Roads, etc.) Loan Act 1873	The New Zealand (Roads, etc.) Loan Act, 1873.	The whole act.
36 & 37 Vict. c. 36	Crown Lands Act 1873	The Crown Lands Act, 1873.	In part, namely,— Section three.
36 & 37 Vict. c. 45	Canada (Public Works) Loan Act 1873	The Canada (Public Works) Loan Act, 1873.	The whole act so far as unrepealed.
36 & 37 Vict. c. 52	Intestates Act 1873	The Intestates Act, 1873.	The whole act, in so far as it extends to Northern Ireland.
36 & 37 Vict. c. 60	Extradition Act 1873	The Extradition Act, 1873.	In part, namely,— Section two.
36 & 37 Vict. c. 76	Railway Regulation Act 1873	The Railway Regulation Act, 1873.	In part, namely,— Section six, except in so far as it extends to Northern Ireland.
36 & 37 Vict. c. 84	Militia Pay and Storehouses Act 1873	An Act to explain the Militia Pay Acts, 1868 and 1869, and to facilitate the sale of property held for Militia purposes.	The whole act so far as unrepealed.
37 & 38 Vict. c. 18	Land Tax Commissioners (Appointment) Act 1874	An Act to appoint additional Commissioners for executing the Acts for granting a Land Tax and other rates and taxes.	The whole act.
37 & 38 Vict. c. 24	Harbour of Colombo Loan Act 1874	An Act to empower the Public Works Loan Commissioners to advance a sum of money, by way of loan, for improvement of the Harbour of Colombo in the colony of Ceylon.	The whole act so far as unrepealed.
37 & 38 Vict. c. 42	Building Societies Act 1874	The Building Societies Act, 1874.	In part, namely,— Section two.
37 & 38 Vict. c. 45	County of Hertford and Liberty of St. Albans Act 1874	The County of Hertford and Liberty of St. Albans Act, 1874.	In part, namely,— Section forty.
37 & 38 Vict. c. 61	Royal (late Indian) Ordnance Corps Act 1874	The Royal (late Indian) Ordnance Corps Act, 1874.	The whole act so far as unrepealed.
37 & 38 Vict. c. 81	Great Seal (Offices) Act 1874	The Great Seal (Offices) Act, 1874.	In part, namely,— Sections ten and eleven.
37 & 38 Vict. c. 92	Alderney Harbour (Transfer) Act 1874	The Alderney Harbour (Transfer) Act, 1874.	In part, namely,— Section two paragraph two.
38 & 39 Vict. c. 27	Intestates Act 1875	The Intestates Act, 1875.	The whole act, in so far as it extends to Northern Ireland.
38 & 39 Vict. c. 28	Metropolitan Police Staff (Superannuation) Act 1875	The Metropolitan Police Staff (Superannuation) Act, 1875.	In part, namely,— Section three to " allowance and ".
38 & 39 Vict. c. 34	Bishopric of St. Albans Act 1875	The Bishopric of St. Albans Act, 1875.	In part, namely,— Section eight.
38 & 39 Vict. c. 55	Public Health Act 1875	The Public Health Act, 1875.	In part, namely,— Section one hundred and forty-five.
38 & 39 Vict. c. 64	Government Officers (Security) Act 1875	The Government Officers (Security) Act, 1875.	In part, namely,— Section three.
39 & 40 Vict. c. 5	Telegraph (Money) Act 1876	The Telegraph (Money) Act, 1876.	The whole act so far as unrepealed.
39 & 40 Vict. c. 20	Statute Law Revision (Substituted Enactments) Act 1876	The Statute Law Revision (Substituted Enactments) Act, 1876.	In part, namely,— Section two.
39 & 40 Vict. c. 35	Customs Tariff Act 1876	The Customs Tariff Act, 1876.	In part, namely,— References in the schedule to (a) chicory, cocoa and coffee. (b) chloral hydrate.
39 & 40 Vict. c. 61	Divided Parishes and Poor Law Amendment Act 1876	The Divided Parishes and Poor Law Amendment Act, 1876.	In part, namely,— Section twenty-nine.
40 & 41 Vict. c. 21	Prison Act 1877	The Prison Act, 1877.	In part, namely,— Sections twenty-two; twenty-three; thirty-five and thirty-six. Section fifty-two. Sections fifty-three and fifty-five.
40 & 41 Vict. c. 53	Prisons (Scotland) Act 1877	The Prisons (Scotland) Act, 1877.	In part, namely,— Sections forty; forty-one; forty-two and forty-three. Section fifty-five so far as unrepealed. Section fifty-nine. Section seventy from " For the purposes of this Act, sufficient accommodation " to the end of the section. Section seventy-one in the definition of " County " the words from " For the purposes of this Act " to the end of the definition.
40 & 41 Vict. c. 57	Supreme Court of Judicature (Ireland) Act 1877	The Supreme Court of Judicature (Ireland) Act, 1877.	In part, namely,— Sections fifteen and seventeen. Section twenty-eight subsection nine.
41 & 42 Vict. c. 18	Public Works Loans Act 1878	The Public Works Loans Act, 1878.	In part, namely,— Section three so far as unrepealed.
41 & 42 Vict. c. 27	Supreme Court of Judicature Act (Ireland) 1877, Amendment Act 1878	The Supreme Court of Judicature Act (Ireland), 1877, Amendment Act, 1878.	In part, namely,— Section one the proviso.
41 & 42 Vict. c. 31	Bills of Sale Act 1878	The Bills of Sale Act, 1878.	In part, namely,— Section eighteen.
41 & 42 Vict. c. 41	Parliamentary Elections Returning Officers Expenses (Scotland) Act 1878	The Parliamentary Elections Returning Officers Expenses (Scotland) Act, 1878.	The whole act so far as unrepealed.
41 & 42 Vict. c. 49	Weights and Measures Act 1878	The Weights and Measures Act, 1878.	In part, namely,— Section sixty-nine from " and for the purposes " to end of section.
41 & 42 Vict. c. 51	Roads and Bridges (Scotland) Act 1878	The Roads and Bridges (Scotland) Act, 1878.	In part, namely,— Section fifteen.
41 & 42 Vict. c. 53	Admiralty and War Office Regulation Act 1878	The Admiralty and War Office Regulation Act, 1878.	The whole act so far as unrepealed.
41 & 42 Vict. c. 63	Prison (Officers Superannuation) Act 1878	The Prison (Officers Superannuation) Act, 1878.	The whole act.
42 & 43 Vict. c. 19	Habitual Drunkards Act 1879	The Habitual Drunkards Act, 1879.	In part, namely,— Sections four and five.
42 & 43 Vict. c. 32	Military Prisons Act 1879	The Military Prisons Act, 1879.	The whole act so far as unrepealed.
42 & 43 Vict. c. 44	Lord Clerk Register (Scotland) Act 1879	The Lord Clerk Register (Scotland) Act, 1879.	In part, namely,— Section six. Section seven. Section ten.
42 & 43 Vict. c. 52	Land Tax Commissioners (Names) Act 1879	The Land Tax Commissioners (Names) Act, 1879.	The whole act.
42 & 43 Vict. c. 54	Poor Law Act 1879	The Poor Law Act, 1879.	In part, namely,— Section eighteen the definitions of " the Metropolis ", " Metropolitan Asylums Board ", " Urban sanitary district ", " rural sanitary district " and " union ". Section nineteen.
42 & 43 Vict. c. 77	Public Works Loans Act 1879	The Public Works Loans Act, 1879.	In part, namely,— Section four from " nor to any advance " to " the harbour of Colombo ".
43 Vict. c. 14	Customs and Inland Revenue Act 1880	The Customs and Inland Revenue Act, 1880.	In part, namely,— Section nine and schedule.
43 & 44 Vict. c. 19	Taxes Management Act 1880	The Taxes Management Act, 1880.	In part, namely,— Section fifty-three.
43 & 44 Vict. c. 20	Inland Revenue Act 1880	The Inland Revenue Act, 1880.	In part, namely,— Section thirty-six.
43 & 44 Vict. c. 32	Bastardy Orders Act 1880	The Bastardy Orders Act, 1880.	The whole act.
44 & 45 Vict. c. 12	Customs and Inland Revenue Act 1881	The Customs and Inland Revenue Act, 1881.	In part, namely,— Section four. Section twenty-five.
44 & 45 Vict. c. 16 (Note: Incorrectly cited as "The Land Tax Commissioners (Names) Act, 1881." in the original printed copy.)	Land Tax Commissioners (Names) Act 1886	The Land Tax Commissioners (Names) Act, 1886.	The whole act.
44 & 45 Vict. c. 30	Customs (Officers) Act 1881	The Customs (Officers) Act, 1881.	The whole act.
44 & 45 Vict. c. 43	Superannuation Act 1881	The Superannuation Act, 1881.	The whole act.
44 & 45 Vict. c. 49	Land Law (Ireland) Act 1881	The Land Law (Ireland) Act, 1881.	In part, namely,— Section four subsection four; section eight so far as unrepealed; section thirteen subsection three to " day of the date of application."; and section nineteen. Sections twenty-four and twenty-six so far as unrepealed; section twenty-nine; section thirty subsection three so far as unrepealed; section thirty-four so far as unrepealed; sections thirty-five and thirty-six. Section thirty-nine. Section forty-one; in section forty-two the words from the beginning to " styled ' the Irish Land Commission ' "; sections forty-three to forty-seven so far as unrepealed; section forty-nine; section fifty-three so far as unrepealed; sections fifty-four and fifty-five. Section sixty.
44 & 45 Vict. c. 55	National Debt Act 1881	The National Debt Act, 1881.	The whole act so far as unrepealed.
44 & 45 Vict. c. 57	Regulation of the Forces Act 1881	The Regulation of the Forces Act, 1881.	In part, namely,— Section fifty-three.
44 & 45 Vict. c. 64	Central Criminal Court (Prisons) Act 1881	The Central Criminal Court (Prisons) Act, 1881.	In part, namely,— Section two subsection three.
45 & 46 Vict. c. 3	Slate Mines (Gunpowder) Act 1882	The Slate Mines (Gunpowder) Act, 1882.	The whole act so far as it extends to England and Scotland.
45 & 46 Vict. c. 37	Corn Returns Act 1882	The Corn Returns Act, 1882.	In part, namely,— Section nineteen subsection three.
45 & 46 Vict. c. 48	Reserve Forces Act 1882	The Reserve Forces Act, 1882.	In part, namely,— Section twenty-eight (Definitions) the words " not holding an honorary commission." Section twenty-nine the last paragraph.
45 & 46 Vict. c. 49	Militia Act 1882	The Militia Act, 1882.	In part, namely,— Section fifty-four subsection one.
45 & 46 Vict. c. 50	Municipal Corporations Act 1882	The Municipal Corporations Act, 1882.	In part, namely,— Section two hundred and forty-eight subsection four.
45 & 46 Vict. c. 55	Merchant Shipping (Expenses) Act 1882	The Merchant Shipping (Expenses) Act, 1882.	The whole act so far as unrepealed.
45 & 46 Vict. c. 62	Public Works Loans Act 1882	The Public Works Loans Act, 1882.	In part, namely,— Section eleven.
45 & 46 Vict. c. 72	Revenue, Friendly Societies and National Debt Act 1882	The Revenue, Friendly Societies and National Debt Act, 1882.	In part, namely,— Section twelve. Section nineteen from " and the said Act " to the end of the section. Section twenty-two.
46 & 47 Vict. c. 34	Cheap Trains Act 1883	The Cheap Trains Act, 1883.	In part, namely,— Sections three subsection three; six subsections three and four and section ten from " and except as " to the end of the section.
46 & 47 Vict. c. 43	Tramways and Public Companies (Ireland) Act 1883	The Tramways and Public Companies (Ireland) Act, 1883.	In part, namely,— Sections thirteen and fourteen; section fifteen subsections one and two; sections sixteen and eighteen.
46 & 47 Vict. c. 54	National Debt Act 1883	The National Debt Act, 1883.	The whole act so far as unrepealed.
47 & 48 Vict. c. 2	National Debt Act 1884	The National Debt Act, 1884.	The whole act so far as unrepealed.
47 & 48 Vict. c. 17	Metropolitan Police Act 1884	The Metropolitan Police Act, 1884.	In part, namely,— Section two so far as unrepealed.
47 & 48 Vict. c. 23	National Debt (Conversion of Stock) Act 1884	The National Debt (Conversion of Stock) Act, 1884.	In part, namely,— Section three so far as unrepealed. Section eight.
47 & 48 Vict. c. 55	Pensions and Yeomanry Pay Act 1884	The Pensions and Yeomanry Pay Act, 1884.	In part, namely,— Section two subsection four.
47 & 48 Vict. c. 57	Superannuation Act 1884	The Superannuation Act, 1884.	The whole act so far as unrepealed.
48 & 49 Vict. c. 58	Telegraph Act 1885	The Telegraph Act, 1885.	In part, namely,— Section three.
48 & 49 Vict. c. 67	Indian Army Pension Deficiency Act 1885	The Indian Army Pension Deficiency Act, 1885.	The whole act.
48 & 49 Vict. c. 73	Purchase of Land (Ireland) Act 1885	The Purchase of Land (Ireland) Act, 1885.	In part, namely,— Sections two and three so far as unrepealed; section five so far as unrepealed; section six; section nine so far as unrepealed; sections ten, eleven and thirteen; section fourteen so far as unrepealed. Section seventeen so far as unrepealed; sections eighteen, twenty and twenty-one; section twenty-two so far as unrepealed.
49 & 50 Vict. c. 8	Army (Annual) Act 1886	The Army (Annual) Act, 1886.	The whole act so far as unrepealed.
49 & 50 Vict. c. 9	Prison (Officers Superannuation) Act 1886	The Prison (Officers Superannuation) Act, 1886.	The whole act.
49 & 50 Vict. c. 41	Customs Amendment Act 1886	The Customs Amendment Act, 1886.	In part, namely,— Section one.
49 & 50 Vict. c. 47	Land Tax Commissioners (Names) Act 1881	The Land Tax Commissioners (Names) Act, 1881.	The whole act.
50 & 51 Vict. c. 16	National Debt and Local Loans Act 1887	The National Debt and Local Loans Act, 1887.	In part, namely,— Section four. Schedule one.
50 & 51 Vict. c. 33	Land Law (Ireland) Act 1887	The Land Law (Ireland) Act, 1887.	In part, namely,— Sections one and six; section eight so far as unrepealed. Sections eleven and twelve; section fifteen, sections sixteen and twenty-two so far as unrepealed; section twenty-three. Section twenty-four so far as unrepealed; section twenty-five; section twenty-seven so far as unrepealed; section twenty-nine. Section thirty-two.
50 & 51 Vict. c. 36	Lieutenancy Clerks Allowances Act 1887	The Lieutenancy Clerks Allowances Act, 1887.	The whole act.
50 & 51 Vict. c. 44	Trinidad and Tobago Act 1887	The Trinidad and Tobago Act, 1887.	In part, namely,— Section one the proviso.
50 & 51 Vict. c. 60	Prison (Officers Superannuation) (Scotland) Act 1887	The Prison (Officers Superannuation) (Scotland) Act, 1887.	The whole act.
50 & 51 Vict. c. 71	Coroners Act 1887	The Coroners Act, 1887.	In part, namely,— Section thirty-one.
51 & 52 Vict. c. 2	National Debt (Conversion) Act 1888	The National Debt (Conversion) Act, 1888.	In part, namely,— Section eighteen. Section thirty.
51 & 52 Vict. c. 4	Army (Annual) Act 1888	The Army (Annual) Act, 1888.	In part, namely,— Section four.
51 & 52 Vict. c. 13	Land Law (Ireland) Act 1888	The Land Law (Ireland) Act, 1888.	The whole act.
51 & 52 Vict. c. 15	National Debt (Supplemental) Act 1888	The National Debt (Supplemental) Act, 1888.	In part, namely,— Section four.
51 & 52 Vict. c. 31	National Defence Act 1888	The National Defence Act, 1888.	In part, namely,— Section three. Schedules one and two.
51 & 52 Vict. c. 32	Imperial Defence Act 1888	The Imperial Defence Act, 1888.	The whole act so far as unrepealed.
51 & 52 Vict. c. 49	Purchase of Land (Ireland) Amendment Act 1888	The Purchase of Land (Ireland) Amendment Act, 1888.	The whole act so far as unrepealed.
51 & 52 Vict. c. 56	Suffragans Nomination Act 1888	The Suffragans Nomination Act, 1888.	In part, namely,— Section three.
52 & 53 Vict. c. 3	Army (Annual) Act 1889	The Army (Annual) Act, 1889.	In part, namely,— Section four. Section five. Section seven.
52 & 53 Vict. c. 4	National Debt Redemption Act 1889	The National Debt Redemption Act, 1889.	The whole act so far as unrepealed.
52 & 53 Vict. c. 6	National Debt Act 1889	The National Debt Act, 1889.	In part, namely,— Section three. Section four subsections three, four and five.
52 & 53 Vict. c. 7	Customs and Inland Revenue Act 1889	The Customs and Inland Revenue Act, 1889.	In part, namely,— Section three.
52 & 53 Vict. c. 13	Purchase of Land (Ireland) Amendment Act 1889	The Purchase of Land (Ireland) Amendment Act, 1889.	The whole act.
52 & 53 Vict. c. 21	Weights and Measures Act 1889	The Weights and Measures Act, 1889.	In part, namely,— Section sixteen the proviso.
52 & 53 Vict. c. 47	Palatine Court of Durham Act 1889	The Palatine Court of Durham Act, 1889.	In part, namely,— Section ten to " judge thereof ".
52 & 53 Vict. c. 55	Universities (Scotland) Act 1889	The Universities (Scotland) Act, 1889.	In part, namely,— Section fifteen subsection five.
52 & 53 Vict. c. 59	Land Law (Ireland) Act 1888, Amendment Act 1889	The Land Law (Ireland) Act, 1888, Amendment Act, 1889.	The whole act.
52 & 53 Vict. c. 71	Public Works Loans Act 1889	The Public Works Loans Act, 1889.	In part, namely,— Section eight and schedule three.
53 & 54 Vict. c. 4	Army (Annual) Act 1890	The Army (Annual) Act, 1890.	In part, namely,— Section nine subsection one. Section nine subsection two.
53 & 54 Vict. c. 8	Customs and Inland Revenue Act 1890	The Customs and Inland Revenue Act, 1890.	In part, namely,— Section five.
53 & 54 Vict. c. 18	Superannuation (War Department) Act 1890	The Superannuation (War Department) Act, 1890.	The whole act.
53 & 54 Vict. c. 25	Barracks Act 1890	The Barracks Act, 1890.	In part, namely,— Sections five; six; seven; nine and schedule.
54 & 55 Vict. c. 5	Army (Annual) Act 1891	The Army (Annual) Act, 1891.	In part, namely,— Section four. Section six. Section nine.
54 & 55 Vict. c. 24	Public Accounts and Charges Act 1891	The Public Accounts and Charges Act, 1891.	In part, namely,— Section three.
54 & 55 Vict. c. 45	Turbary (Ireland) Act 1891	The Turbary (Ireland) Act, 1891.	In part, namely,— Section one.
54 & 55 Vict. c. 46	Post Office Act 1891	The Post Office Act, 1891.	The whole act so far as unrepealed.
54 & 55 Vict. c. 48	Purchase of Land (Ireland) Act 1891	The Purchase of Land (Ireland) Act, 1891.	In part, namely,— Section one subsection one so far as unrepealed. Section five so far as unrepealed; section six. Sections nine to fourteen so far as unrepealed; in section fifteen, in subsection one, the words " The guaranteed land stock shall, from time to time as required for the purposes of this Act, be created by the Treasury, and issued by the Land Commission in the prescribed manner, and ", in subsection two, the words from " and the National Debt Commissioners " to the end of the subsection, and subsections four, seven, eight, ten and eleven; sections seventeen and eighteen; sections twenty to twenty-four; section twenty-six. Section twenty-eight except subsection seven thereof; section twenty-nine so far as unrepealed; and sections thirty, thirty-one and thirty-two. Sections thirty-four to forty-one so far as unrepealed. The First and Second Schedules. The Third Schedule.
54 & 55 Vict. c. 54	Ranges Act 1891	The Ranges Act, 1891.	The whole act so far as unrepealed.
54 & 55 Vict. c. 57	Redemption of Rent (Ireland) Act 1891	The Redemption of Rent (Ireland) Act, 1891.	The whole act.
54 & 55 Vict. c. 75	Factory and Workshop Act 1891	The Factory and Workshop Act, 1891.	The whole act so far as unrepealed.
55 & 56 Vict. c. 34	Naval Knights of Windsor (Dissolution) Act 1892	The Naval Knights of Windsor (Dissolution) Act, 1892.	In part, namely,— Section one subsection four.
55 & 56 Vict. c. 39	National Debt (Stockholders Relief) Act 1892	The National Debt (Stockholders Relief) Act, 1892.	In part, namely,— Sections four and six.
55 & 56 Vict. c. 49	Mauritius Hurricane Loan Act 1892	The Mauritius Hurricane Loan Act, 1892.	The whole act.
55 & 56 Vict. c. 52	British Columbia (Loan) Act 1892	The British Columbia (Loan) Act, 1892.	The whole act.
55 & 56 Vict. c. 55	Burgh Police (Scotland) Act 1892	The Burgh Police (Scotland) Act, 1892.	In part, namely,— Section seventy-eight last paragraph. Section three hundred and fifteen so far as unrepealed.
55 & 56 Vict. c. 59	Telegraph Act 1892	The Telegraph Act, 1892.	In part, namely,— Section one.
55 & 56 Vict. c. 61	Public Works Loans Act 1892	The Public Works Loans Act, 1892.	In part, namely,— Section four, in so far as it extends to Northern Ireland.
56 & 57 Vict. c. 5	Regimental Debts Act 1893	The Regimental Debts Act, 1893.	In part, namely,— Section twenty-nine (Definitions) the words " although not holding an honorary commission ".
56 & 57 Vict. c. 10	Police Act 1893	The Police Act, 1893.	The whole act so far as unrepealed.
56 & 57 Vict. c. 26	Prison (Officers Superannuation) Act 1893	The Prison (Officers Superannuation) Act, 1893.	The whole act.
56 & 57 Vict. c. 35	Congested Districts Board (Ireland) Act 1893	The Congested Districts Board (Ireland) Act, 1893.	The whole act so far as unrepealed.
57 & 58 Vict. c. 3	Army (Annual) Act 1894	The Army (Annual) Act, 1894.	In part, namely,— Section five.
57 & 58 Vict. c. 30	Finance Act 1894	The Finance Act, 1894.	In part, namely,— Section forty-one so far as unrepealed.
57 & 58 Vict. c. 31	Zanzibar Indemnity Act 1894	The Zanzibar Indemnity Act, 1894.	The whole act.
57 & 58 Vict. c. 50	Congested Districts Board (Ireland) Act 1894	The Congested Districts Board (Ireland) Act, 1894.	The whole act so far as unrepealed.
58 & 59 Vict. c. 7	Army (Annual) Act 1895	The Army (Annual) Act, 1895.	In part, namely,— Section nine.
58 & 59 Vict. c. 16	Finance Act 1895	The Finance Act, 1895.	In part, namely,— Section nine subsection two.
58 & 59 Vict. c. 19	Court of Session Consignations (Scotland) Act 1895	The Court of Session Consignations (Scotland) Act, 1895.	In part, namely,— Section fifteen.
58 & 59 Vict. c. 23	Volunteer Act 1895	The Volunteer Act, 1895.	The whole act so far as unrepealed.
58 & 59 Vict. c. 35	Naval Works Act 1895	The Naval Works Act, 1895.	In part, namely,— Sections one; three; four; five; six and schedule.
58 & 59 Vict. c. 37	Factory and Workshop Act 1895	The Factory and Workshop Act, 1895.	The whole act so far as unrepealed.
59 Vict. Sess. 2. c. 4	Purchase of Land (Ireland) Amendment Act 1895 Session 2	The Purchase of Land (Ireland) Amendment Act, 1895, Session 2.	The whole act.
59 & 60 Vict. c. 2	Army (Annual) Act 1896	The Army (Annual) Act, 1896.	The whole act so far as unrepealed.
59 & 60 Vict. c. 6	Naval Works Act 1896	The Naval Works Act, 1896.	The whole act.
59 & 60 Vict. c. 27	London Cab Act 1896	The London Cab Act, 1896.	In part, namely,— Section two.
59 & 60 Vict. c. 28	Finance Act 1896	The Finance Act, 1896.	In part, namely,— Section seven. Section thirty-seven.
59 & 60 Vict. c. 38	Uganda Railway Act 1896	The Uganda Railway Act, 1896.	The whole act.
59 & 60 Vict. c. 40	Telegraph (Money) Act 1896	The Telegraph (Money) Act, 1896.	The whole act.
59 & 60 Vict. c. 47	Land Law (Ireland) Act 1896	The Land Law (Ireland) Act, 1896.	In part, namely,— Sections one to three. Section four. Section five subsections two and three; in section six the proviso; sections eight and nine; section ten subsection two. Section fourteen. Section twenty-nine subsection one; sections thirty to thirty-three and thirty-five to thirty-seven; section thirty-nine so far as unrepealed; sections forty and forty-two. Sections forty-three to forty-five so far as unrepealed. Sections forty-six and forty-seven. Section fifty subsections one, two and six. The Schedules.
59 & 60 Vict. c. 50	Poor Law Officers Superannuation Act 1896	The Poor Law Officers Superannuation Act, 1896.	In part, namely,— Section eleven.
59 & 60 Vict. c. 58	West Highland Railway Guarantee Act 1896	The West Highland Railway Guarantee Act, 1896.	The whole act.
60 & 61 Vict. c. 7	Military Works Act 1897	The Military Works Act, 1897.	The whole act.
60 & 61 Vict. c. 26	Metropolitan Police Courts Act 1897	The Metropolitan Police Courts Act, 1897.	In part, namely,— Section six. Section seven subsection one, from " or at any court " to the end of the subsection.
60 & 61 Vict. c. 35	Naval Works Act 1897	The Naval Works Act, 1897.	The whole act.
60 & 61 Vict. c. 41	Post Office and Telegraph Act 1897	The Post Office and Telegraph Act, 1897.	In part, namely,— Section three.
60 & 61 Vict. c. 66	Supreme Court of Judicature (Ireland) (No. 2) Act 1897	The Supreme Court of Judicature (Ireland) (No. 2) Act, 1897.	In part, namely,— Section twelve, in so far as it extends to Northern Ireland.
61 & 62 Vict. c. 10	Finance Act 1898	The Finance Act, 1898.	In part, namely,— Section sixteen.
61 & 62 Vict. c. 31	Metropolitan Police Courts Act 1898	The Metropolitan Police Courts Act, 1898.	The whole act so far as unrepealed.
61 & 62 Vict. c. 33	Telegraph (Money) Act 1898	The Telegraph (Money) Act, 1898.	The whole act.
61 & 62 Vict. c. 54	Public Works Loans Act 1898	The Public Works Loans Act, 1898.	In part, namely,— Section five.
62 & 63 Vict. c. 3	Army (Annual) Act 1899	The Army (Annual) Act, 1899.	In part, namely,— Section four. Section five.
62 & 63 Vict. c. 9	Finance Act 1899	The Finance Act, 1899.	In part, namely,— Section seventeen.
62 & 63 Vict. c. 14	London Government Act 1899	The London Government Act, 1899.	In part, namely,— Schedule two Part two so far as concerns 34 & 35 Vict. c. 113.
62 & 63 Vict. c. 15	Metropolis Management Act Amendment (Byelaws) Act 1899	The Metropolis Management Act Amendment (Byelaws) Act, 1899.	The whole act so far as unrepealed.
62 & 63 Vict. c. 18	Congested Districts Board (Ireland) Act 1899	The Congested Districts Board (Ireland) Act, 1899.	The whole act so far as unrepealed.
62 & 63 Vict. c. 38	Telegraph Act 1899	The Telegraph Act, 1899.	In part, namely,— Sections one and three.
62 & 63 Vict. c. 41	Military Works Act 1899	The Military Works Act, 1899.	The whole act.
62 & 63 Vict. c. 42	Naval Works Act 1899	The Naval Works Act, 1899.	In part, namely,— Section one and schedule.
63 & 64 Vict. c. 2	War Loan Act 1900	The War Loan Act, 1900.	The whole act so far as unrepealed.
63 & 64 Vict. c. 4	Census (Great Britain) Act 1900	The Census (Great Britain) Act, 1900.	The whole act so far as unrepealed.
63 & 64 Vict. c. 61	Supplemental War Loan Act 1900	The Supplemental War Loan Act, 1900.	The whole act.
64 Vict. Sess. 2. c. 1	Supplemental War Loan (No. 2) Act 1900	The Supplemental War Loan (No. 2) Act, 1900.	The whole act.
1 Edw. 7. c. 3	Purchase of Land (Ireland) Act 1901	The Purchase of Land (Ireland) Act, 1901.	The whole act so far as unrepealed.
1 Edw. 7. c. 4	Civil List Act 1901	The Civil List Act, 1901.	In part, namely,— Section four. Section eight the words " for . . . His Majesty's daughters and ".
1 Edw. 7. c. 24	Burgh Sewerage, Drainage and Water Supply (Scotland) Act 1901	The Burgh Sewerage, Drainage and Water Supply (Scotland) Act, 1901.	In part, namely,— Section nine.
1 Edw. 7. c. 30	Purchase of Land (Ireland) (No. 2) Act 1901	The Purchase of Land (Ireland) (No. 2) Act, 1901.	The whole act.
1 Edw. 7. c. 34	Congested Districts Board (Ireland) Act 1901	The Congested Districts Board (Ireland) Act, 1901.	The whole act.
2 Edw. 7. c. 40	Uganda Railway Act 1902	The Uganda Railway Act, 1902.	The whole act so far as unrepealed.
3 Edw. 7. c. 8	Finance Act 1903	The Finance Act, 1903.	The whole act so far as unrepealed.
3 Edw. 7. c. 25	Licensing (Scotland) Act 1903	The Licensing (Scotland) Act, 1903.	In part, namely,— Section twenty-seven subsection two.
3 Edw. 7. c. 37	Irish Land Act 1903	The Irish Land Act, 1903.	In part, namely,— Section one; section two so far as unrepealed; sections three to five; section six so far as unrepealed; sections seven to twelve; section fifteen; section sixteen subsection two; sections seventeen to nineteen; section twenty-three so far as unrepealed; in section twenty-four, subsections one, three and eight; sections twenty-five and twenty-six; section thirty; and sections forty-three and forty-eight so far as unrepealed. Section fifty-two subsections two and three. Section fifty-three; sections fifty-seven to sixty; section sixty-one, except subsections four and five thereof; sections sixty-two to sixty-four and section seventy. Sections seventy-two to eighty-five. Section eighty-seven. Section eighty-nine. Section ninety-one. Sections ninety-three to ninety-five.
3 Edw. 7. c. 46	Revenue Act 1903	The Revenue Act, 1903.	In part, namely,— Section twelve.
4 Edw. 7. c. 5	Army (Annual) Act 1904	The Army (Annual) Act, 1904.	In part, namely,— Sections six subsection two and twelve paragraph (b).
4 Edw. 7. c. 34	Irish Land Act 1904	The Irish Land Act, 1904.	In part, namely,— Section one.
4 Edw. 7. c. 36	Public Works Loans Act 1904	The Public Works Loans Act, 1904.	The whole act so far as unrepealed.
5 Edw. 7. c. 12	Churches (Scotland) Act 1905	The Churches (Scotland) Act, 1905.	In part, namely,— Section five the last sentence.
6 Edw. 7. c. 2	Army (Annual) Act 1906	The Army (Annual) Act, 1906.	In part, namely,— Section seven subsection one.
7 Edw. 7. c. 18	Married Women's Property Act 1907	The Married Women's Property Act, 1907.	In part, namely,— Section four subsection two.
7 Edw. 7. c. 56	Evicted Tenants (Ireland) Act 1907	The Evicted Tenants (Ireland) Act, 1907.	In part, namely,— Sections three; six; twelve and fourteen; section sixteen so far as unrepealed; section seventeen subsection one; section eighteen; the Schedule.
8 Edw. 7. c. 67	Children Act 1908	The Children Act, 1908.	In part, namely,— Section one hundred and twenty-three subsection two so far as unrepealed, and so far as it extends to England.
9 Edw. 7. c. 3	Army (Annual) Act 1909	The Army (Annual) Act, 1909.	In part, namely,— Section eleven. Schedule two as to section ninety-one of the Army Act.
9 Edw. 7. c. 16	Workmen's Compensation (Anglo-French Convention) Act 1909	The Workmen's Compensation (Anglo-French Convention) Act, 1909.	The whole act, in so far as it extends to Northern Ireland.
9 Edw. 7. c. 40	Police Act 1909	The Police Act, 1909.	In part, namely,— Section three.
9 Edw. 7. c. 42	Irish Land Act 1909	The Irish Land Act, 1909.	In part, namely,— Sections three to five; section six so far as unrepealed; section nine subsection one. Section eleven subsection two. Sections twelve; fifteen and seventeen; section eighteen subsections one and four; section nineteen. Section twenty so far as unrepealed; section twenty-one. Section twenty-two. Sections twenty-three and twenty-four; sections twenty-six to twenty-eight; section twenty-nine so far as unrepealed; sections thirty-one; thirty-five; thirty-six; forty; forty-two and forty-three. Sections forty-four to sixty. Sections sixty-one to sixty-four. Section sixty-five. The First Schedule.
9 Edw. 7. c. 44	Housing, Town Planning etc. Act 1909	The Housing, Town Planning etc. Act, 1909.	The whole act so far as unrepealed.
1 & 2 Geo. 5. c. 26	Telephone Transfer Act 1911	The Telephone Transfer Act, 1911.	In part, namely,— Sections one; two; three and four.
1 & 2 Geo. 5. c. 50	Coal Mines Act 1911	The Coal Mines Act, 1911.	In part, namely,— Section sixty-two paragraph two from " but any tub " to the end of the paragraph.
1 & 2 Geo. 5. c. 55	National Insurance Act 1911	The National Insurance Act, 1911.	The whole act so far as unrepealed, except so far as it extends to Northern Ireland.
2 & 3 Geo. 5. c. 2	Coal Mines (Minimum Wages) Act 1912	The Coal Mines (Minimum Wages) Act, 1912.	The whole act.
2 & 3 Geo. 5. c. 19	Light Railways Act 1912	The Light Railways Act, 1912.	In part, namely,— Section five subsection two.
4 & 5 Geo. 5. c. 2	Army (Annual) Act 1914	The Army (Annual) Act, 1914.	In part, namely,— Section seven.
4 & 5 Geo. 5. c. 15	Exportation of Horses Act 1914	The Exportation of Horses Act, 1914.	In part, namely,— Section one subsection two.
5 & 6 Geo. 5. c. 30	Naval Discipline Act 1915	The Naval Discipline Act, 1915.	In part, namely,— Section fourteen.
5 & 6 Geo. 5. c. 73	Naval Discipline (No. 2) Act 1915	The Naval Discipline (No. 2) Act, 1915.	In part, namely,— Section three.
5 & 6 Geo. 5. c. 89	Finance (No. 2) Act 1915	The Finance (No. 2) Act, 1915.	In part, namely,— Section thirteen subsections one and four.
6 & 7 Geo. 5. c. 12	Local Government (Emergency Provisions) Act 1916	The Local Government (Emergency Provisions) Act, 1916.	In part, namely,— Section thirteen subsection seven.
6 & 7 Geo. 5. c. 47	Municipal Savings Banks (War Loan Investment) Act 1916	The Municipal Savings Banks (War Loan Investment) Act, 1916.	The whole act.
6 & 7 Geo. 5. c. 49	Court of Session (Extracts) Act 1916	The Court of Session (Extracts) Act, 1916.	In part, namely,— The Schedule.
6 & 7 Geo. 5. c. 61	Munitions (Liability for Explosions) Act 1916	The Munitions (Liability for Explosions) Act, 1916.	The whole act.
7 & 8 Geo. 5. c. 31	Finance Act 1917	The Finance Act, 1917.	In part, namely,— Section thirty-six.
8 & 9 Geo. 5. c. 24	Flax Companies (Financial Assistance) Act 1918	The Flax Companies (Financial Assistance) Act, 1918.	In part, namely,— Section one, paragraph (i).
8 & 9 Geo. 5. c. 34	Statutory Undertakings (Temporary Increase of Charges) Act 1918	Statutory Undertakings (Temporary Increase of Charges) Act, 1918.	The whole act.
8 & 9 Geo. 5. c. 42	Loans (Incumbents of Benefices) Amendment Act 1918	The Loans (Incumbents of Benefices) Amendment Act, 1918.	In part, namely,— Section six.
8 & 9 Geo. 5. c. 43	Midwives Act 1918	The Midwives Act, 1918.	In part, namely,— Section twelve so far as unrepealed.
8 & 9 Geo. 5. c. 48	Education (Scotland) Act 1918	The Education (Scotland) Act, 1918.	In part, namely,— Section thirty-one so far as unrepealed.
9 & 10 Geo. 5. c. 11	Army (Annual) Act 1919	The Army (Annual) Act, 1919.	In part, namely,— Section seventeen.
9 & 10 Geo. 5. c. 32	Finance Act 1919	The Finance Act, 1919.	In part, namely,— Section eleven.
9 & 10 Geo. 5. c. 37	War Loan Act 1919	The War Loan Act, 1919.	In part, namely,— Section six.
9 & 10 Geo. 5. c. 50	Ministry of Transport Act 1919	The Ministry of Transport Act, 1919.	In part, namely,— Section twenty-one.
9 & 10 Geo. 5. c. 60	Housing, Town Planning etc. (Scotland) Act 1919	The Housing, Town Planning etc. (Scotland) Act, 1919.	In part, namely,— Section twenty-two and so far as unrepealed section thirty-one.
9 & 10 Geo. 5. c. 82	Irish Land (Provision for Sailors and Soldiers) Act 1919	The Irish Land (Provision for Sailors and Soldiers) Act, 1919.	In part, namely,— Sections one and three.
9 & 10 Geo. 5. c. 97	Land Settlement (Scotland) Act 1919	The Land Settlement (Scotland) Act, 1919.	In part, namely,— Sections two and twenty-seven.
10 & 11 Geo. 5. c. 7	Army and Air Force (Annual) Act 1920	The Army and Air Force (Annual) Act, 1920.	In part, namely,— Section six. Section nine. Section twelve subsection one paragraph (a).
10 & 11 Geo. 5. c. 14	Tramways (Temporary Increase of Charges) Act 1920	The Tramways (Temporary Increase of Charges) Act, 1920.	The whole act, except in so far as it extends to Northern Ireland.
10 & 11 Geo. 5. c. 18	Finance Act 1920	The Finance Act, 1920.	In part, namely,— Section five subsections one and two. Section six. Section thirty-nine subsection one paragraphs (a) and (c).
10 & 11 Geo. 5. c. 47	Ministry of Food (Continuance) Act 1920	The Ministry of Food (Continuance) Act, 1920.	The whole act so far as unrepealed.
10 & 11 Geo. 5. c. 48	Indemnity Act 1920	The Indemnity Act, 1920.	In part, namely,— Section two and Schedule.
10 & 11 Geo. 5. c. 57	Unemployment (Relief Works) Act 1920	The Unemployment (Relief Works) Act, 1920.	The whole act.
10 & 11 Geo. 5. c. 71	Housing (Scotland) Act 1920	The Housing (Scotland) Act, 1920.	The whole act so far as unrepealed.
10 & 11 Geo. 5. c. 72	Roads Act 1920	The Roads Act, 1920.	In part, namely,— Section eighteen paragraphs (a) and (c).
11 & 12 Geo. 5. c. 2	Consolidated Fund (No. 1) Act 1921	The Consolidated Fund (No. 1) Act, 1921.	The whole act.
11 & 12 Geo. 5. c. 3	Consolidated Fund (No. 2) Act 1921	The Consolidated Fund (No. 2) Act, 1921.	The whole act.
11 & 12 Geo. 5. c. 8	Ministries of Munitions and Shipping (Cessation) Act 1921	The Ministries of Munitions and Shipping (Cessation) Act, 1921.	The whole act.
11 & 12 Geo. 5. c. 9	Army and Air Force (Annual) Act 1921	The Army and Air Force (Annual) Act, 1921.	In part, namely,— Preamble; sections two and three. Section five. Section seven. Section nine subsection one paragraph (a) and subsection two. Section nine subsection three. Schedule.
11 & 12 Geo. 5. c. 10	Mr. Speaker's Retirement Act 1921	Mr. Speaker's Retirement Act, 1921.	The whole act.
11 & 12 Geo. 5. c. 16	Importation of Plumage (Prohibition) Act 1921	The Importation of Plumage (Prohibition) Act, 1921.	In part, namely,— Section four subsection three.
11 & 12 Geo. 5. c. 19	Housing Act 1921	The Housing Act, 1921.	The whole act so far as unrepealed, except so far as it extends to Northern Ireland.
11 & 12 Geo. 5. c. 21	Dentists Act 1921	The Dentists Act, 1921.	In part, namely,— Section one subsection four. Section eighteen subsection two and schedule two.
11 & 12 Geo. 5. c. 28	Merchant Shipping Act 1921	The Merchant Shipping Act, 1921.	In part, namely,— Section four subsection two.
11 & 12 Geo. 5. c. 29	Church of Scotland Act 1921	The Church of Scotland Act, 1921.	In part, namely,— Section four from " and shall come into operation " to the end of the section.
11 & 12 Geo. 5. c. 32	Finance Act 1921	The Finance Act, 1921.	In part, namely,— Sections one and two. Section three. Sections four and five. Section six subsection two. Section twenty. Section twenty-four. Sections twenty-five subsection one and forty-one. Section forty-six. Section fifty-two. Sections fifty-three; fifty-four; fifty-five; fifty-six; fifty-seven and fifty-eight. Section fifty-nine. Section sixty-five subsection three. Schedule three paragraph three. Schedule five.
11 & 12 Geo. 5. c. 35	Corn Sales Act 1921	The Corn Sales Act, 1921.	In part, namely,— Section two subsection one. Section three. Section seven subsection two.
11 & 12 Geo. 5. c. 36	Juries (Emergency Provisions) (Renewal) Act 1921	The Juries (Emergency Provisions) (Renewal) Act, 1921.	The whole act.
11 & 12 Geo. 5. c. 37	Territorial Army and Militia Act 1921	The Territorial Army and Militia Act, 1921.	In part, namely,— Section five subsection two. Schedule two.
11 & 12 Geo. 5. c. 39	Admiralty Pensions Act 1921	The Admiralty Pensions Act, 1921.	In part, namely,— Section three.
11 & 12 Geo. 5. c. 40	Isle of Man (Customs) Act 1921	The Isle of Man (Customs) Act, 1921.	The whole act.
11 & 12 Geo. 5. c. 41	Greenwich Hospital Act 1921	The Greenwich Hospital Act, 1921.	The whole act.
11 & 12 Geo. 5. c. 42	Licensing Act 1921	The Licensing Act, 1921.	In part, namely,— Sections nineteen and twenty-one subsection one paragraph (h). Section twenty-two subsection four.
11 & 12 Geo. 5. c. 43	Land Settlement Amendment Act 1921	The Land Settlement Amendment Act, 1921.	The whole act.
11 & 12 Geo. 5. c. 45	Duchy of Lancaster (Application of Capital Moneys) Act 1921	The Duchy of Lancaster (Application of Capital Moneys) Act, 1921.	The whole act.
11 & 12 Geo. 5. c. 46	Appropriation Act 1921	The Appropriation Act, 1921.	The whole act.
11 & 12 Geo. 5. c. 48	Corn Production Acts (Repeal) Act 1921	The Corn Production Acts (Repeal) Act, 1921.	In part, namely,— Sections two and three. Section six.
11 & 12 Geo. 5. c. 52	Exchequer and Audit Departments Act 1921	The Exchequer and Audit Departments Act, 1921.	In part, namely,— Sections nine subsection four; ten subsection two and schedule two.
11 & 12 Geo. 5. c. 53	Expiring Laws Continuance Act 1921	The Expiring Laws Continuance Act, 1921.	The whole act.
11 & 12 Geo. 5. c. 54	Public Works Loans Act 1921	The Public Works Loans Act, 1921.	The whole act.
11 & 12 Geo. 5. c. 58	Trusts (Scotland) Act 1921	The Trusts (Scotland) Act, 1921.	In part, namely,— Section thirty-six and Schedule C.
11 & 12 Geo. 5. c. 61	Forestry Act 1921	The Forestry Act, 1921.	The whole act.
11 & 12 Geo. 5. c. 63	Appropriation (No. 2) Act 1921	The Appropriation (No. 2) Act, 1921.	The whole act.
11 & 12 Geo. 5. c. 67	Local Authorities (Financial Provisions) Act 1921	The Local Authorities (Financial Provisions) Act, 1921.	In part, namely,— Section three subsection three the proviso and section six.
12 & 13 Geo. 5. c. 1	Consolidated Fund (No. 1) Act 1922	The Consolidated Fund (No. 1) Act, 1922.	The whole act.
12 & 13 Geo. 5. c. 2	Coroners (Emergency Provisions Continuance) Act 1922	The Coroners (Emergency Provisions Continuance) Act, 1922.	The whole act.
12 & 13 Geo. 5. c. 3	Consolidated Fund (No. 2) Act 1922	The Consolidated Fund (No. 2) Act, 1922.	The whole act.
12 & 13 Geo. 5. c. 6	Army and Air Force (Annual) Act 1922	The Army and Air Force (Annual) Act, 1922.	In part, namely,— Preamble; sections two; three and schedule.
12 & 13 Geo. 5. c. 8	Diseases of Animals Act 1922	The Diseases of Animals Act, 1922.	The whole act.
12 & 13 Geo. 5. c. 11	Juries Act 1922	The Juries Act, 1922.	In part, namely,— Section four subsection two. Section eight subsection four and schedule.
12 & 13 Geo. 5. c. 16	Law of Property Act 1922	The Law of Property Act, 1922.	In part, namely,— Section one hundred and ninety-one subsection two.
12 & 13 Geo. 5. c. 17	Finance Act 1922	The Finance Act, 1922.	In part, namely,— Section one. Sections two and three so far as unrepealed. Sections four and five. Section thirteen subsection two. Section sixteen. Section thirty-two. Section thirty-three. Section thirty-four subsection ten. Sections forty-two and forty-three. Section forty-nine subsection four. Schedule two. Schedule three.
12 & 13 Geo. 5. c. 21	Treaties of Washington Act 1922	The Treaties of Washington Act, 1922.	In part, namely,— Section six subsection two.
12 & 13 Geo. 5. c. 25	British Empire Exhibition (Amendment) Act 1922	The British Empire Exhibition (Amendment) Act, 1922.	The whole act.
12 & 13 Geo. 5. c. 26	Anglo-Persian Oil Company (Payment of Calls) Act 1922	The Anglo-Persian Oil Company (Payment of Calls) Act, 1922.	In part, namely,— Section three subsection two.
12 & 13 Geo. 5. c. 32	Appropriation Act 1922	The Appropriation Act, 1922.	The whole act.
12 & 13 Geo. 5. c. 33	Public Works Loans Act 1922	The Public Works Loans Act, 1922.	The whole act so far as unrepealed.
12 & 13 Geo. 5. c. 35	Celluloid and Cinematograph Film Act 1922	The Celluloid and Cinematograph Film Act, 1922.	In part, namely,— Section eleven subsection one from " and shall come " to the end of the subsection.
12 & 13 Geo. 5. c. 36	Isle of Man (Customs) Act 1922	The Isle of Man (Customs) Act, 1922.	The whole act.
12 & 13 Geo. 5. c. 37	Naval Discipline Act 1922	The Naval Discipline Act, 1922.	In part, namely,— Section nine subsection two. Section nine subsection three and schedule.
12 & 13 Geo. 5. c. 39	Oil in Navigable Waters Act 1922	The Oil in Navigable Waters Act, 1922.	In part, namely,— Section nine subsection three.
12 & 13 Geo. 5. c. 46	Electricity (Supply) Act 1922	The Electricity (Supply) Act, 1922.	In part, namely,— Section twenty-three subsection two.
12 & 13 Geo. 5. c. 47	Railway and Canal Commission (Consents) Act 1922	The Railway and Canal Commission (Consents) Act, 1922.	The whole act.
12 & 13 Geo. 5. c. 49	Post Office (Parcels) Act 1922	The Post Office (Parcels) Act, 1922.	In part, namely,— Section three subsection two. Section three subsection four.
12 & 13 Geo. 5. c. 50	Expiring Laws Act 1922	The Expiring Laws Act, 1922.	In part, namely,— Section two. Section three. Schedule two. Schedule three.
12 & 13 Geo. 5. c. 51	Allotments Act 1922	The Allotments Act, 1922.	In part, namely,— Section eight subsection one. Sections nineteen subsection two; twenty-three subsection two and schedule.
12 & 13 Geo. 5. c. 52	Allotments (Scotland) Act 1922	The Allotments (Scotland) Act, 1922.	In part, namely,— Section seventeen subsection three. Section twenty and schedule one.
12 & 13 Geo. 5. c. 54	Milk and Dairies (Amendment) Act 1922	The Milk and Dairies (Amendment) Act, 1922.	In part, namely,— Section fourteen paragraph (b). Section fourteen paragraph (d). Section fourteen paragraph (h). Section fifteen subsection three.
12 & 13 Geo. 5. c. 56	Criminal Law Amendment Act 1922	The Criminal Law Amendment Act, 1922.	In part, namely,— Sections five; six subsection two and schedule.
13 Geo. 5 Sess. 2. c. 2	Irish Free State (Consequential Provisions) Act 1922 (Session 2)	The Irish Free State (Consequential Provisions) Act, 1922 (Session 2).	In part, namely,— Section one subsection two. Section three subsection seven. Schedule two Part two from " and the person ". Schedule two Part three from " and any commissioner ".
13 Geo. 5 Sess. 2. c. 3	Appropriation Act 1922 (Session 2)	The Appropriation Act, 1922 (Session 2).	The whole act.
13 Geo. 5 Sess. 2. c. 4	Trade Facilities and Loans Guarantee Act 1922 (Session 2)	The Trade Facilities and Loans Guarantee Act, 1922 (Session 2).	In part, namely,— Section one subsection one.
13 Geo. 5 Sess. 2. c. 5	Importation of Animals Act 1922 (Session 2)	The Importation of Animals Act, 1922 (Session 2).	In part, namely,— Section ten subsection four.
13 & 14 Geo. 5. c. 1	Consolidated Fund (No. 1) Act 1923	The Consolidated Fund (No. 1) Act, 1923.	The whole act.
13 & 14 Geo. 5. c. 3	Army and Air Force (Annual) Act 1923	The Army and Air Force (Annual) Act, 1923.	In part, namely,— Preamble; sections two and three. Section fourteen subsection one. Section fifteen. Schedule.
13 & 14 Geo. 5. c. 4	Fees (Increase) Act 1923	The Fees (Increase) Act, 1923.	In part, namely,— Section ten and schedule three.
13 & 14 Geo. 5. c. 7	Increase of Rent and Mortgage Interest Restrictions (Continuance) Act 1923	The Increase of Rent and Mortgage Interest Restrictions (Continuance) Act, 1923.	The whole act.
13 & 14 Geo. 5. c. 8	Industrial Assurance Act 1923	The Industrial Assurance Act, 1923.	In part, namely,— Sections seventeen subsection four; thirty subsection three; thirty-five subsection two and forty-six subsection three. Section forty-six subsection four and schedule five.
13 & 14 Geo. 5. c. 10	Agricultural Holdings (Scotland) Act 1923	The Agricultural Holdings (Scotland) Act, 1923.	In part, namely,— Section forty subsection three (as originally enacted). Section fifty to " Provided that ". Section fifty-one. Schedule four.
13 & 14 Geo. 5. c. 11	Special Constables Act 1923	The Special Constables Act, 1923.	In part, namely,— Section one subsection two.
13 & 14 Geo. 5. c. 12	Restoration of Order in Ireland (Indemnity) Act 1923	The Restoration of Order in Ireland (Indemnity) Act, 1923.	In part, namely,— Section one subsection one the proviso, subsections two and three.
13 & 14 Geo. 5. c. 14	Finance Act 1923	The Finance Act, 1923.	In part, namely,— Section one. Sections two subsection two last sentence and three subsection two last sentence. Section four. Sections six; seven; fourteen and twenty-one. Section thirty-six. Sections thirty-eight; thirty-nine subsection four and schedule.
13 & 14 Geo. 5. c. 16	Salmon and Freshwater Fisheries Act 1923	The Salmon and Freshwater Fisheries Act, 1923.	In part, namely,— Section ninety-three subsection one. Section ninety-four subsection two. Schedule five.
13 & 14 Geo. 5. c. 20	Mines (Working Facilities and Support) Act 1923	The Mines (Working Facilities and Support) Act, 1923.	In part, namely,— Section eighteen subsection two.
13 & 14 Geo. 5. c. 21	Forestry (Transfer of Woods) Act 1923	The Forestry (Transfer of Woods) Act, 1923.	In part, namely,— Section six subsection four.
13 & 14 Geo. 5. c. 22	Cotton Industry Act 1923	The Cotton Industry Act, 1923.	The whole act.
13 & 14 Geo. 5. c. 23	Bastardy Act 1923	The Bastardy Act, 1923.	In part, namely,— Section six from " and shall " to the end of the section.
13 & 14 Geo. 5. c. 24	Housing etc. Act 1923	The Housing etc. Act, 1923.	In part, namely,— Section two subsection eight. Section six subsection one to " repealed; but ". Section sixteen. Section twenty-three subsection sixteen. Section twenty-four subsection one and schedule three.
13 & 14 Geo. 5. c. 26	Isle of Man (Customs) Act 1923	The Isle of Man (Customs) Act, 1923.	The whole act.
13 & 14 Geo. 5. c. 27	Railways Fires Act (1905) Amendment Act 1923	The Railways Fires Act (1905) Amendment Act, 1923.	In part, namely,— Section three.
13 & 14 Geo. 5. c. 28	Intoxicating Liquor (Sale to Persons under Eighteen) Act 1923	The Intoxicating Liquor (Sale to Persons under Eighteen) Act, 1923.	In part namely,— Section one subsection five.
13 & 14 Geo. 5. c. 29	Public Works Loans Act 1923	The Public Works Loans Act, 1923.	The whole act.
13 & 14 Geo. 5. c. 30	Railways (Authorisation of Works) Act 1923	The Railways (Authorisation of Works) Act, 1923.	The whole act.
13 & 14 Geo. 5. c. 32	Rent and Mortgage Interest Restrictions Act 1923	The Rent and Mortgage Interest Restrictions Act, 1923.	In part, namely,— Section one. Section six subsection two.
13 & 14 Geo. 5. c. 34	Agricultural Credits Act 1923	The Agricultural Credits Act, 1923.	In part, namely,— Section two.
13 & 14 Geo. 5. c. 35	Appropriation Act 1923	The Appropriation Act, 1923.	The whole act.
13 & 14 Geo. 5. c. 37	Expiring Laws Continuance Act 1923	The Expiring Laws Continuance Act, 1923.	The whole act.
13 & 14 Geo. 5. c. 40	Merchant Shipping Acts (Amendment) Act 1923	The Merchant Shipping Acts (Amendment) Act, 1923.	In part, namely,— Section two subsection two.
14 & 15 Geo. 5. c. 2	Consolidated Fund (No. 1) Act 1924	The Consolidated Fund (No. 1) Act, 1924.	The whole act.
14 & 15 Geo. 5. c. 4	Consolidated Fund (No. 2) Act 1924	The Consolidated Fund (No. 2) Act, 1924.	The whole act.
14 & 15 Geo. 5. c. 5	Army and Air Force (Annual) Act 1924	The Army and Air Force (Annual) Act, 1924.	In part, namely,— Preamble, sections two and three. Section nine. Section ten. Schedule.
14 & 15 Geo. 5. c. 8	Trade Facilities Act 1924	The Trade Facilities Act, 1924.	In part, namely,— Section one.
14 & 15 Geo. 5. c. 10	National Health Insurance (Cost of Medical Benefit) Act 1924	The National Health Insurance (Cost of Medical Benefit) Act, 1924.	The whole act.
14 & 15 Geo. 5. c. 11	Friendly Societies Act 1924	The Friendly Societies Act, 1924.	In part, namely,— Section two subsection three.
14 & 15 Geo. 5. c. 12	School Teachers (Superannuation) Act 1924	The School Teachers (Superannuation) Act, 1924.	The whole act.
14 & 15 Geo. 5. c. 21	Finance Act 1924	The Finance Act, 1924.	In part, namely,— Section one. Section six subsection one. Sections six subsection three; eight; nine and nineteen. Section twenty. Section thirty-two. Section forty. Section forty-one subsection four. Schedule two. Schedule three.
14 & 15 Geo. 5. c. 24	Isle of Man (Customs) Act 1924	The Isle of Man (Customs) Act, 1924.	In part, namely,— Sections one; two and three.
14 & 15 Geo. 5. c. 26	Public Works Loans Act 1924	The Public Works Loans Act, 1924.	The whole act.
14 & 15 Geo. 5. c. 27	Conveyancing (Scotland) Act 1924	The Conveyancing (Scotland) Act, 1924.	In part, namely,— Section one subsection two. Section sixteen subsection five.
14 & 15 Geo. 5. c. 29	Local Authorities (Emergency Provisions) Act 1924	The Local Authorities (Emergency Provisions) Act, 1924.	The whole act so far as unrepealed.
14 & 15 Geo. 5. c. 31	Appropriation Act 1924	The Appropriation Act, 1924.	The whole act.
14 & 15 Geo. 5. c. 34	London Traffic Act 1924	The London Traffic Act, 1924.	In part, namely,— Section seventeen subsection one from " and shall " to the end of the subsection.
15 & 16 Geo. 5. c. 1	Expiring Laws Continuance Act 1924	The Expiring Laws Continuance Act, 1924.	The whole act.
15 & 16 Geo. 5. c. 4	Law of Property Act (Postponement) Act 1924	The Law of Property Act (Postponement) Act, 1924.	The whole act.
15 & 16 Geo. 5. c. 5	Law of Property (Amendment) Act 1924	The Law of Property (Amendment) Act, 1924.	In part, namely,— Sections one and ten. Section twelve subsection three. Schedules one and ten.
15 & 16 Geo. 5. c. 7	William Preston Indemnity Act 1925	The William Preston Indemnity Act, 1925.	The whole act.
15 & 16 Geo. 5. c. 8	Consolidated Fund (No. 1) Act 1925	The Consolidated Fund (No. 1) Act, 1925.	The whole act.
15 & 16 Geo. 5. c. 12	British Sugar (Subsidy) Act 1925	The British Sugar (Subsidy) Act, 1925.	The whole act.
15 & 16 Geo. 5. c. 13	Trade Facilities Act 1925	The Trade Facilities Act, 1925.	The whole act.
15 & 16 Geo. 5. c. 15	Housing (Scotland) Act 1925	The Housing (Scotland) Act, 1925.	In part, namely,— Section one hundred and twenty subsection one to " Provided that ". Section one hundred and twenty-one subsection two. Schedule six.
15 & 16 Geo. 5. c. 18	Settled Land Act 1925	The Settled Land Act, 1925.	In part, namely,— Section one hundred and nineteen subsection one to " Provided that ". Section one hundred and twenty subsection two. Schedule five.
15 & 16 Geo. 5. c. 19	Trustee Act 1925	The Trustee Act, 1925.	In part, namely,— Section seventy to " Provided that ". Section seventy-one subsection two. Schedule two.
15 & 16 Geo. 5. c. 20	Law of Property Act 1925	The Law of Property Act, 1925.	In part, namely,— Section two hundred and seven to " Provided that ". Section two hundred and nine subsection two. Schedule seven.
15 & 16 Geo. 5. c. 21	Land Registration Act 1925	The Land Registration Act, 1925.	In part, namely,— Section one hundred and forty-seven to " Provided that " and schedule.
15 & 16 Geo. 5. c. 22	Land Charges Act 1925	The Land Charges Act, 1925.	In part, namely,— Section twenty-four to " Provided that ". Section twenty-six subsection two. Schedule.
15 & 16 Geo. 5. c. 23	Administration of Estates Act 1925	The Administration of Estates Act, 1925.	In part, namely,— Section fifty-eight subsection two. Schedule two.
15 & 16 Geo. 5. c. 24	Universities and College Estates Act 1925	The Universities and College Estates Act, 1925.	In part, namely,— Section forty-four subsection one to " Provided that ". Section forty-five subsection two. Schedule two.
15 & 16 Geo. 5. c. 25	Army and Air Force (Annual) Act 1925	The Army and Air Force (Annual) Act, 1925.	In part, namely,— Preamble, sections two and three. Section five subsection three. Section nine. Section sixteen subsection two. Schedule one.
15 & 16 Geo. 5. c. 26	British Empire Exhibition (Guarantee) Act 1925	The British Empire Exhibition (Guarantee) Act, 1925.	The whole act.
15 & 16 Geo. 5. c. 27	Charitable Trusts Act 1925	The Charitable Trusts Act, 1925.	In part, namely,— Section one subsection four. Section three subsection two.
15 & 16 Geo. 5. c. 28	Administration of Justice Act 1925	The Administration of Justice Act, 1925.	In part, namely,— Sections twenty-seven and twenty-nine subsection four. Section twenty-nine subsection five. Schedules four and five.
15 & 16 Geo. 5. c. 29	Gold Standard Act 1925	The Gold Standard Act, 1925.	In part, namely,— Section two.
15 & 16 Geo. 5. c. 33	Church of Scotland (Property and Endowments) Act 1925	The Church of Scotland (Property and Endowments) Act, 1925.	In part, namely,— Section forty-eight to " that schedule," and schedule twelve.
15 & 16 Geo. 5. c. 34	Northern Ireland Land Act 1925	The Northern Ireland Land Act, 1925.	In part, namely,— Section three subsections one, two and three; sections four and eight; sections nine to eleven; section twelve subsections two and three; sections thirteen and fourteen; sections seventeen to nineteen; section twenty-one. Section twenty-three subsection three. Section twenty-four. Sections twenty-five and twenty-eight. Section thirty-five. The Second and Third Schedules.
15 & 16 Geo. 5. c. 36	Finance Act 1925	The Finance Act, 1925.	In part, namely,— Sections one; two; six subsection one; seven subsections two, three and four; thirteen and fourteen. Section twenty-eight subsection six. Schedule three Part III as to lace and embroidery. Schedule five.
15 & 16 Geo. 5. c. 38	Performing Animals (Regulation) Act 1925	The Performing Animals (Regulation) Act, 1925.	In part, namely,— Section eight subsection three.
15 & 16 Geo. 5. c. 43	Former Enemy Aliens (Disabilities Removal) Act 1925	The Former Enemy Aliens (Disabilities Removal) Act, 1925.	In part, namely,— Section two subsection three.
15 & 16 Geo. 5. c. 45	Guardianship of Infants Act 1925	The Guardianship of Infants Act, 1925.	In part, namely,— Sections four subsection three and five subsection seven. Section eleven subsection three.
15 & 16 Geo. 5. c. 49	Supreme Court of Judicature (Consolidation) Act 1925	The Supreme Court of Judicature (Consolidation) Act, 1925.	In part, namely,— Section two hundred and twenty-six subsection one to " Provided that ". Section two hundred and twenty-seven subsection two. Schedule six.
15 & 16 Geo. 5. c. 51	Summary Jurisdiction (Separation and Maintenance) Act 1925	The Summary Jurisdiction (Separation and Maintenance) Act, 1925.	In part, namely,— Section seven subsection three.
15 & 16 Geo. 5. c. 56	Isle of Man (Customs) Act 1925	The Isle of Man (Customs) Act, 1925.	In part, namely,— Sections one; two; three; four and eight. Section nine.
15 & 16 Geo. 5. c. 57	Appropriation Act 1925	The Appropriation Act, 1925.	The whole act.
15 & 16 Geo. 5. c. 59	Teachers (Superannuation) Act 1925	The Teachers (Superannuation) Act, 1925.	In part, namely,— Section twenty-three subsection two. Section twenty-three subsection three.
15 & 16 Geo. 5. c. 60	Therapeutic Substances Act 1925	The Therapeutic Substances Act, 1925.	In part, namely,— Section eight subsection two.
15 & 16 Geo. 5. c. 61	Allotments Act 1925	The Allotments Act, 1925.	In part, namely,— Section twelve subsection three.
15 & 16 Geo. 5. c. 62	Public Works Loans Act 1925	The Public Works Loans Act, 1925.	The whole act.
15 & 16 Geo. 5. c. 63	Diseases of Animals Act 1925	The Diseases of Animals Act, 1925.	The whole act so far as unrepealed.
15 & 16 Geo. 5. c. 73	National Library of Scotland Act 1925	The National Library of Scotland Act, 1925.	In part, namely,— Section thirteen subsections one, two and three.
15 & 16 Geo. 5. c. 74	Dangerous Drugs Act 1925	The Dangerous Drugs Act, 1925.	In part, namely,— Sections two and four subsection two. Section seven subsection three.
15 & 16 Geo. 5. c. 76	Expiring Laws Act 1925	The Expiring Laws Act, 1925.	In part, namely,— Section two and schedule two.
15 & 16 Geo. 5. c. 77	Ireland (Confirmation of Agreement) Act 1925	The Ireland (Confirmation of Agreement) Act, 1925.	In part, namely,— Section two subsection two.
15 & 16 Geo. 5. c. 78	Appropriation (No. 2) Act 1925	The Appropriation (No. 2) Act, 1925.	The whole act.
15 & 16 Geo. 5. c. 79	Safeguarding of Industries (Customs Duties) Act 1925	The Safeguarding of Industries (Customs Duties) Act, 1925.	The whole act.
15 & 16 Geo. 5. c. 81	Circuit Courts & Criminal Procedure (Scotland) Act 1925	The Circuit Courts & Criminal Procedure (Scotland) Act, 1925.	In part, namely,— The Schedule.
15 & 16 Geo. 5. c. 82	Roads and Streets in Police Burghs (Scotland) Act 1925	The Roads and Streets in Police Burghs (Scotland) Act, 1925.	In part, namely,— Section three.
15 & 16 Geo. 5. c. 86	Criminal Justice Act 1925	The Criminal Justice Act, 1925.	In part, namely,— Section thirty. Sections forty-two and forty-nine subsection four. Section forty-nine subsection five. Schedule three.
15 & 16 Geo. 5. c. 87	Tithe Act 1925	The Tithe Act, 1925.	In part, namely,— Sections twenty-three and twenty-six subsection three. Section twenty-six subsection four and schedule two.
15 & 16 Geo. 5. c. 88	Coastguard Act 1925	The Coastguard Act, 1925.	In part, namely,— Section three subsection four.
15 & 16 Geo. 5. c. 90	Rating and Valuation Act 1925	The Rating and Valuation Act, 1925.	In part, namely,— Sections six subsection three; twelve subsection four and fifteen subsection two. Section forty-eight subsection nine. Section sixty-nine subsection four. Schedule eight.
16 & 17 Geo. 5. c. 1	Consolidated Fund (No. 1) Act 1926	The Consolidated Fund (No. 1) Act, 1926.	The whole act.
16 & 17 Geo. 5. c. 2	Public Works Loans Act 1926	The Public Works Loans Act, 1926.	The whole act.
16 & 17 Geo. 5. c. 6	Army and Air Force (Annual) Act 1926	The Army and Air Force (Annual) Act, 1926.	In part, namely,— Preamble; sections two; three and ten subsection two. Section four. Schedule one.
16 & 17 Geo. 5. c. 7	Bankruptcy (Amendment) Act 1926	The Bankruptcy (Amendment) Act, 1926.	In part, namely,— Section nine.
16 & 17 Geo. 5. c. 9	Economy (Miscellaneous Provisions) Act 1926	The Economy (Miscellaneous Provisions) Act, 1926.	In part, namely,— Section nineteen subsection two and schedule four.
16 & 17 Geo. 5. c. 10	Local Authorities (Emergency Provisions) Act 1926	The Local Authorities (Emergency Provisions) Act, 1926.	The whole act so far as unrepealed.
16 & 17 Geo. 5. c. 11	Law of Property (Amendment) Act 1926	The Law of Property (Amendment) Act, 1926.	In part, namely,— Section eight subsection two.
16 & 17 Geo. 5. c. 12	Unemployment Insurance Act 1926	The Unemployment Insurance Act, 1926.	The whole act.
16 & 17 Geo. 5. c. 16	Execution of Diligence (Scotland) Act 1926	The Execution of Diligence (Scotland) Act, 1926.	In part, namely,— Section seven.
16 & 17 Geo. 5. c. 17	Coal Mines Act 1926	The Coal Mines Act, 1926.	The whole act.
16 & 17 Geo. 5. c. 18	Secretaries of State Act 1926	The Secretaries of State Act, 1926.	In part, namely,— Section four subsection two and schedule.
16 & 17 Geo. 5. c. 19	Re-election of Ministers Act (1919) Amendment Act 1926	The Re-election of Ministers Act (1919) Amendment Act, 1926.	The whole act.
16 & 17 Geo. 5. c. 22	Finance Act 1926	The Finance Act, 1926.	In part, namely,— Sections one; two; eleven and nineteen. Section twenty-five subsection two. Section thirty-two subsection three. Section thirty-seven subsection three. Section forty-seven subsection five and schedule five.
16 & 17 Geo. 5. c. 23	Appropriation Act 1926	The Appropriation Act, 1926.	The whole act.
16 & 17 Geo. 5. c. 27	Isle of Man (Customs) Act 1926	The Isle of Man (Customs) Act, 1926.	In part, namely,— Sections one; two; three; four; five; seven; nine; ten; fourteen and schedules one and three.
16 & 17 Geo. 5. c. 28	Mining Industry Act 1926	The Mining Industry Act, 1926.	In part, namely,— Section seventeen subsection three. Section eighteen.
16 & 17 Geo. 5. c. 29	Adoption of Children Act 1926	The Adoption of Children Act, 1926.	In part, namely,— Section twelve subsection two.
16 & 17 Geo. 5. c. 31	Home Counties (Music and Dancing) Licensing Act 1926	The Home Counties (Music and Dancing) Licensing Act, 1926.	In part, namely,— Section six and schedule two.
16 & 17 Geo. 5. c. 33	Appropriation (No. 2) Act 1926	The Appropriation (No. 2) Act, 1926.	The whole act.
16 & 17 Geo. 5. c. 36	Parks Regulation (Amendment) Act 1926	The Parks Regulation (Amendment) Act, 1926.	In part, namely,— Section four subsection four and schedule.
16 & 17 Geo. 5. c. 37	Lead Paint (Protection against Poisoning) Act 1926	The Lead Paint (Protection against Poisoning) Act, 1926.	In part, namely,— Section eight subsection two.
16 & 17 Geo. 5. c. 43	Public Health (Smoke Abatement) Act 1926	The Public Health (Smoke Abatement) Act, 1926.	In part, namely,— Section nine, so far as unrepealed. Section twelve subsection four.
16 & 17 Geo. 5. c. 45	Fertilisers and Feeding Stuffs Act 1926	The Fertilisers and Feeding Stuffs Act, 1926.	In part, namely,— Section thirty subsection two. Section thirty subsection three.
16 & 17 Geo. 5. c. 47	Rating (Scotland) Act 1926	The Rating (Scotland) Act, 1926.	In part, namely,— Section thirty. Section thirty-one subsection two. Schedule three.
16 & 17 Geo. 5. c. 48	Births and Deaths Registration Act 1926	The Births and Deaths Registration Act, 1926.	In part, namely,— Section thirteen subsection one. Section thirteen subsection four. Schedule two.
16 & 17 Geo. 5. c. 49	Expiring Laws Continuance Act 1926	The Expiring Laws Continuance Act, 1926.	The whole act.
16 & 17 Geo. 5. c. 53	Merchandise Marks Act 1926	The Merchandise Marks Act, 1926.	In part, namely,— Section one subsection five.
16 & 17 Geo. 5. c. 59	Coroners (Amendment) Act 1926	The Coroners (Amendment) Act, 1926.	In part, namely,— Section one subsection four. Section four subsection six. Section nine and section thirty-one to " Provided that ". Section thirty-four subsection four. Schedule three.
16 & 17 Geo. 5. c. 60	Legitimacy Act 1926	The Legitimacy Act, 1926.	In part, namely,— Section twelve subsection two.
16 & 17 Geo. 5. c. 63	Sale of Food (Weights and Measures) Act 1926	The Sale of Food (Weights and Measures) Act, 1926.	In part, namely,— Section fifteen subsection two. Section fifteen subsection three and schedule three.
17 & 18 Geo. 5. c. 1	Public Works Loans Act 1927	The Public Works Loans Act, 1927.	The whole act so far as unrepealed.
17 & 18 Geo. 5. c. 2	Consolidated Fund (No. 1) Act 1927	The Consolidated Fund (No. 1) Act, 1927.	The whole act.
17 & 18 Geo. 5. c. 4	Royal and Parliamentary Titles Act 1927	The Royal and Parliamentary Titles Act, 1927.	In part, namely,— Section one.
17 & 18 Geo. 5. c. 7	Army and Air Force (Annual) Act 1927	The Army and Air Force (Annual) Act, 1927.	In part, namely,— Preamble, sections two; three and schedule.
17 & 18 Geo. 5. c. 8	Government of India (Indian Navy) Act 1927	The Government of India (Indian Navy) Act, 1927.	The whole act, so far as unrepealed.
17 & 18 Geo. 5. c. 10	Finance Act 1927	The Finance Act, 1927.	In part, namely,— Section one. Section seven subsections one and two. Section nine. Section nineteen. Section twenty. Section forty-seven subsection three. Section forty-eight. Section fifty-seven subsection six. Schedule two, Parts I and II. Schedule four so far as unrepealed. Schedule six.
17 & 18 Geo. 5. c. 11	Appropriation Act 1927	The Appropriation Act, 1927.	The whole act.
17 & 18 Geo. 5. c. 12	Auctions (Bidding Agreements) Act 1927	The Auctions (Bidding Agreements) Act, 1927.	In part, namely,— Section four subsection one, from " and shall " to the end of the subsection.
17 & 18 Geo. 5. c. 13	Diseases of Animals Act 1927	The Diseases of Animals Act, 1927.	In part, namely,— Section one subsection three. Section six subsection four and schedule.
17 & 18 Geo. 5. c. 16	Land Tax Commissioners Act 1927	The Land Tax Commissioners Act, 1927.	The whole act.
17 & 18 Geo. 5. c. 20	Isle of Man (Customs) Act 1927	The Isle of Man (Customs) Act, 1927.	In part, namely,— Sections two; three; four; five; six; eight; nine; ten; thirteen. Section seventeen subsection two. Schedule two. Schedule four.
17 & 18 Geo. 5. c. 21	Moneylenders Act 1927	The Moneylenders Act, 1927.	In part, namely,— Section nineteen, subsection three to " Provided that ", and Schedule two.
17 & 18 Geo. 5. c. 23	Crown Lands Act 1927	The Crown Lands Act, 1927.	In part, namely,— Sections sixteen subsection two; twenty-five paragraph (c); twenty-six subsection two and schedule.
17 & 18 Geo. 5. c. 25	Appropriation (No. 2) Act 1927	The Appropriation (No. 2) Act, 1927.	The whole act.
17 & 18 Geo. 5. c. 28	Public Works Loans Act 1927	The Public Works Loans Act, 1927.	The whole act.
17 & 18 Geo. 5. c. 34	Expiring Laws Continuance Act 1927	The Expiring Laws Continuance Act, 1927.	The whole act.
17 & 18 Geo. 5. c. 35	Sheriff Courts and Legal Officers (Scotland) Act 1927	The Sheriff Courts and Legal Officers (Scotland) Act, 1927.	In part, namely,— Section twenty-two. Section twenty-three. Section twenty-four subsection one. Schedule.
17 & 18 Geo. 5. c. 36	Landlord and Tenant Act 1927	The Landlord and Tenant Act, 1927.	In part, namely,— Section twenty-six subsection two.
17 & 18 Geo. 5. c. 37	Road Transport Lighting Act 1927	The Road Transport Lighting Act, 1927.	In part, namely,— Section eleven subsection one. Section sixteen subsection two. Schedule.
17 & 18 Geo. 5. c. 40	Indian Church Act 1927	The Indian Church Act, 1927.	In part, namely,— Section two paragraph (i). Section eleven. Schedule one.
17 & 18 Geo. 5. c. 42	Statute Law Revision Act 1927	The Statute Law Revision Act, 1927.	In part, namely,— The Schedule, Part I.
18 & 19 Geo. 5. c. 1	Consolidated Fund (No. 1) Act 1928	The Consolidated Fund (No. 1) Act, 1928.	The whole act.
18 & 19 Geo. 5. c. 6	Rating (Scotland) Amendment Act 1928	The Rating (Scotland) Amendment Act, 1928.	The whole act.
18 & 19 Geo. 5. c. 7	Army and Air Force Act 1928	The Army and Air Force Act, 1928.	In part, namely,— Preamble, sections two and three. Section four, paragraph one from " and for paragraph (k) " to " regularly relieved ". Section seven subsection two. Section seven subsection three. Section eight. Schedule one. Schedule three.
18 & 19 Geo. 5. c. 9	Local Authorities (Emergency Provisions) Act 1928	The Local Authorities (Emergency Provisions) Act, 1928.	The whole act so far as unrepealed.
18 & 19 Geo. 5. c. 11	Cotton Industry Act 1928	The Cotton Industry Act, 1928.	The whole act.
18 & 19 Geo. 5. c. 13	Currency and Bank Notes Act 1928	The Currency and Bank Notes Act, 1928.	In part, namely,— Section thirteen subsection two. Section thirteen subsection four and schedule.
18 & 19 Geo. 5. c. 15	Bankers (Northern Ireland) Act 1928	The Bankers (Northern Ireland) Act, 1928.	In part, namely,— Section four subsection three.
18 & 19 Geo. 5. c. 16	Mr. Speaker's Retirement Act 1928	Mr. Speaker's Retirement Act, 1928.	The whole act.
18 & 19 Geo. 5. c. 17	Finance Act 1928	The Finance Act, 1928.	In part, namely,— Section five. Sections nine, fifteen and twenty. Section thirty-five subsection six and schedule five.
18 & 19 Geo. 5. c. 18	Appropriation Act 1928	The Appropriation Act, 1928.	The whole act.
18 & 19 Geo. 5. c. 26	Administration of Justice Act 1928	The Administration of Justice Act, 1928.	In part, namely,— Section five. Section twenty subsection two and schedule two.
18 & 19 Geo. 5. c. 29	Slaughter of Animals (Scotland) Act 1928	The Slaughter of Animals (Scotland) Act, 1928.	In part, namely,— Section eleven subsection two.
18 & 19 Geo. 5. c. 31	Food and Drugs (Adulteration) Act 1928	The Food and Drugs (Adulteration) Act, 1928.	The whole act, so far as unrepealed, in so far as it extends to Northern Ireland.
18 & 19 Geo. 5. c. 32	Petroleum (Consolidation) Act 1928	The Petroleum (Consolidation) Act, 1928.	In part, namely,— Section twenty-six subsection three to " Provided that ". Section twenty-six subsection five. Schedule three.
18 & 19 Geo. 5. c. 33	Shops (Hours of Closing) Act 1928	The Shops (Hours of Closing) Act, 1928.	In part, namely,— Section ten subsection four and schedule four.
18 & 19 Geo. 5. c. 34	Reorganisation of Offices (Scotland) Act 1928	The Reorganisation of Offices (Scotland) Act, 1928.	In part, namely,— Section one subsection six from " and the enactments " to the end of the section and section fourteen and schedule.
18 & 19 Geo. 5. c. 36	Naval Prize Act 1928	The Naval Prize Act, 1928.	In part, namely,— Section four subsection two and schedule.
18 & 19 Geo. 5. c. 42	Criminal Law Amendment Act 1928	The Criminal Law Amendment Act, 1928.	In part, namely,— Section two subsection two.
18 & 19 Geo. 5. c. 43	Agricultural Credits Act 1928	The Agricultural Credits Act, 1928.	In part, namely,— Section twelve. Section fifteen subsection two.
18 & 19 Geo. 5. c. 44	Rating and Valuation (Apportionment) Act 1928	The Rating and Valuation (Apportionment) Act, 1928.	In part, namely,— Section nine subsection fifteen.
19 & 20 Geo. 5. c. 2	Consolidated Fund (No. 1) Act 1928 (Session 2)	The Consolidated Fund (No. 1) Act, 1928 (Session 2).	The whole act.
19 & 20 Geo. 5. c. 3	Expiring Laws Continuance Act 1928	The Expiring Laws Continuance Act, 1928.	The whole act.
19 & 20 Geo. 5. c. 5	Public Works Loans Act 1928	The Public Works Loans Act, 1928.	The whole act.
19 & 20 Geo. 5. c. 10	Consolidated Fund (No. 2) Act 1929	The Consolidated Fund (No. 2) Act, 1929.	The whole act.
19 & 20 Geo. 5. c. 13	Agricultural Credits (Scotland) Act 1929	The Agricultural Credits (Scotland) Act, 1929.	In part, namely,— Section ten subsection two.
19 & 20 Geo. 5. c. 14	Northern Ireland Land Act 1929	The Northern Ireland Land Act, 1929.	In part, namely,— Section one. Sections two and five. Section six.
19 & 20 Geo. 5. c. 16	Pensions (Governors of Dominions etc.) Act 1929	The Pensions (Governors of Dominions etc.) Act, 1929.	In part, namely,— Section three subsection four. Section ten subsection three and schedule.
19 & 20 Geo. 5. c. 17	Local Government Act 1929	The Local Government Act, 1929.	In part, namely,— Sections thirty-five subsection four and one hundred and thirty. Section one hundred and thirty-seven and schedule twelve.
19 & 20 Geo. 5. c. 20	Army and Air Force (Annual) Act 1929	The Army and Air Force (Annual) Act, 1929.	In part, namely,— Preamble; sections two; three and schedule one. Schedule two, the amendment relating to section 85.
19 & 20 Geo. 5. c. 21	Finance Act 1929	The Finance Act, 1929.	In part, namely,— Section one. Sections two & three. Section five. Section six subsection three and schedule.
19 & 20 Geo. 5. c. 22	Appropriation Act 1929	The Appropriation Act, 1929.	The whole act.
19 & 20 Geo. 5. c. 25	Local Government (Scotland) Act 1929	The Local Government (Scotland) Act, 1929.	In part, namely,— Section three subsection three the proviso. Sections seventy-two and seventy-four. Section seventy-five. Section seventy-six subsections one, two and three. Section seventy-six subsection seven. Section seventy-nine subsection one. Section eighty subsection two. Schedule nine.
19 & 20 Geo. 5. c. 27	Savings Banks Act 1929	The Savings Banks Act, 1929.	In part, namely,— Sections three and twenty subsection four. Section twenty subsection five. Schedule.
19 & 20 Geo. 5. c. 29	Government Annuities Act 1929	The Government Annuities Act, 1929.	In part, namely,— Section thirty-six subsection one; sixty-six subsection one and sixty-nine. Section seventy subsection one from " and shall come " to the end of the subsection. Schedule two.
19 & 20 Geo. 5. c. 30	Chatham & Sheerness Stipendiary Magistrates Act 1929	The Chatham & Sheerness Stipendiary Magistrates Act, 1929.	The whole act.
19 & 20 Geo. 5. c. 32	Artificial Cream Act 1929	The Artificial Cream Act, 1929.	In part, namely,— Section eight subsection two.
19 & 20 Geo. 5. c. 37	Police Magistrates Superannuation (Amendment) Act 1929	The Police Magistrates Superannuation (Amendment) Act, 1929.	In part, namely,— Section three subsection two.
20 & 21 Geo. 5. c. 1	Isle of Man (Customs) Act 1929	The Isle of Man (Customs) Act, 1929.	In part, namely,— Section one. Section three to " Provided that " and section four.
20 & 21 Geo. 5. c. 4	Irish Free State (Confirmation of Agreement) Act 1929	The Irish Free State (Confirmation of Agreement) Act, 1929.	In part, namely,— Section two subsection two.
20 & 21 Geo. 5. c. 9	Under Secretaries of State Act 1929	The Under Secretaries of State Act, 1929.	The whole act.
20 & 21 Geo. 5. c. 11	Consolidated Fund (No. 1) Act 1929 (Session 2)	The Consolidated Fund (No. 2) Act, 1929 (Session 2).	The whole act.
20 & 21 Geo. 5. c. 12	Expiring Laws Continuance Act 1929	The Expiring Laws Continuance Act, 1929.	The whole act.
20 & 21 Geo. 5. c. 14	Consolidated Fund (No. 2) Act 1930	The Consolidated Fund (No. 2) Act, 1930.	The whole act.
20 & 21 Geo. 5. c. 18	Consolidated Fund (No. 3) Act 1930	The Consolidated Fund (No. 3) Act, 1930.	The whole act.
20 & 21 Geo. 5. c. 20	Land Drainage (Scotland) Act 1930	The Land Drainage (Scotland) Act, 1930.	In part, namely,— Section three. Section ten.
20 & 21 Geo. 5. c. 22	Army and Air Force (Annual) Act 1930	The Army and Air Force (Annual) Act, 1930.	In part, namely,— Preamble; sections two; three and six subsection two. Section eight. Schedule one.
20 & 21 Geo. 5. c. 23	Mental Treatment Act 1930	The Mental Treatment Act, 1930.	In part, namely,— Section fourteen subsection two. Sections fifteen subsection three and sixteen subsection three. Section twenty-two subsection two. Section twenty-two subsection four. Schedule four.
20 & 21 Geo. 5. c. 27	Appropriation Act 1930	The Appropriation Act, 1930.	The whole act.
20 & 21 Geo. 5. c. 28	Finance Act 1930	The Finance Act, 1930.	In part, namely,— Section one subsection one. Section one subsection two. Section two subsections two, three and four. Section two subsection five. Section four. Section five. Sections eight and nine. Section ten. Section forty-six. Section fifty-three subsection eight and schedule three.
20 & 21 Geo. 5. c. 32	Poor Prisoners Defence Act 1930	The Poor Prisoners Defence Act, 1930.	In part, namely,— Section five subsection one from " and shall " to the end of the subsection. Section five subsection four to " Provided that ".
20 & 21 Geo. 5. c. 35	Hairdressers and Barbers Shops (Sunday Closing) Act 1930	The Hairdressers and Barbers Shops (Sunday Closing) Act, 1930.	In part, namely,— Section six subsection one from " and shall " to the end of the subsection.
20 & 21 Geo. 5. c. 37	Adoption of Children (Scotland) Act 1930	The Adoption of Children (Scotland) Act, 1930.	In part, namely,— Section five subsection two so far as unrepealed. Section twelve subsection two.
20 & 21 Geo. 5. c. 38	Navy and Marines (Wills) Act 1930	The Navy and Marines (Wills) Act, 1930.	In part, namely,— Sections one subsection one; two subsection three and schedule two.
20 & 21 Geo. 5. c. 39	Housing Act 1930	The Housing Act, 1930.	In part, namely,— Section sixty-four subsection one to " Provided that ". Section sixty-five subsection four. Schedule six.
20 & 21 Geo. 5. c. 40	Housing (Scotland) Act 1930	The Housing (Scotland) Act, 1930.	In part, namely,— Sections twenty-two subsection three; fifty-one subsection one to " Provided that " and schedule six.
20 & 21 Geo. 5. c. 42	Isle of Man (Customs) Act 1930	The Isle of Man (Customs) Act, 1930.	In part, namely,— Section one. Sections three and five.
20 & 21 Geo. 5. c. 43	Road Traffic Act 1930	The Road Traffic Act, 1930.	In part, namely,— Section sixty paragraph (f). Section one hundred and twenty-three subsection two. Schedule five except so far as it relates to the Locomotives Act, 1861, and the Locomotives Act, 1898.
20 & 21 Geo. 5. c. 44	Land Drainage Act 1930	The Land Drainage Act, 1930.	In part, namely,— Section eighty-three subsection one to " Provided that " and schedule seven.
20 & 21 Geo. 5. c. 45	Criminal Appeal (Northern Ireland) Act 1930	The Criminal Appeal (Northern Ireland) Act, 1930.	In part, namely,— Section twenty-one subsection four and schedule.
20 & 21 Geo. 5. c. 46	British Museum Act 1930	The British Museum Act, 1930.	In part, namely,— Section two. Section three subsection two.
20 & 21 Geo. 5. c. 48	London Naval Treaty Act 1930	The London Naval Treaty Act, 1930.	In part, namely,— Section one subsection two. Section two.
20 & 21 Geo. 5. c. 49	Public Works Loans Act 1930	The Public Works Loans Act, 1930.	The whole act.
20 & 21 Geo. 5. c. 51	Reservoirs (Safety Provisions) Act 1930	The Reservoirs (Safety Provisions) Act, 1930.	In part, namely,— Section twelve subsection two.
21 & 22 Geo. 5. c. 1	Consolidated Fund (No. 1) Act 1930 (Session 2)	The Consolidated Fund (No. 1) Act, 1930. Session 2.	The whole act.
21 & 22 Geo. 5. c. 4	Expiring Laws Continuance Act 1930	The Expiring Laws Continuance Act, 1930.	The whole act.
21 & 22 Geo. 5. c. 9	Colonial Naval Defence Act 1931	The Colonial Naval Defence Act, 1931.	In part, namely,— Section four subsection two to " Provided that ".
21 & 22 Geo. 5. c. 10	Consolidated Fund (No. 2) Act 1931	The Consolidated Fund (No. 2) Act, 1931.	The whole act.
21 & 22 Geo. 5. c. 14	Army & Air Force (Annual) Act 1931	The Army & Air Force (Annual) Act, 1931.	In part, namely,— Preamble; sections two; three and schedule one.
21 & 22 Geo. 5. c. 16	Ancient Monuments Act 1931	The Ancient Monuments Act, 1931.	In part, namely,— Section seventeen subsection three and schedule three.
21 & 22 Geo. 5. c. 22	Housing (Rural Workers) Amendment Act 1931	The Housing (Rural Workers) Amendment Act, 1931.	The whole act.
21 & 22 Geo. 5. c. 23	Mining Industry (Welfare Fund) Act 1931	The Mining Industry (Welfare Fund) Act, 1931.	The whole act.
21 & 22 Geo. 5. c. 27	Coal Mines Act 1931	The Coal Mines Act, 1931.	In part, namely,— Sections two; and three subsections three and four.
21 & 22 Geo. 5. c. 28	Finance Act 1931	The Finance Act, 1931.	In part, namely,— Section one subsection one. Sections five and six. Section thirty-eight. Section thirty-nine. Section forty-four subsection six so far as unrepealed and schedule three.
21 & 22 Geo. 5. c. 29	Appropriation Act 1931	The Appropriation Act, 1931.	The whole act.
21 & 22 Geo. 5. c. 30	Probation of Offenders (Scotland) Act 1931	The Probation of Offenders (Scotland) Act, 1931.	In part, namely,— Section twelve subsection two. Section twelve subsection three and schedule.
21 & 22 Geo. 5. c. 31	Marriage (Prohibited Degrees of Relationship) Act 1931	The Marriage (Prohibited Degrees of Relationship) Act, 1931.	In part, namely,— Section three subsection three.
21 & 22 Geo. 5. c. 32	Road Traffic (Amendment) Act 1931	The Road Traffic (Amendment) Act, 1931.	In part, namely,— Section one.
21 & 22 Geo. 5. c. 33	Architects (Registration) Act 1931	The Architects (Registration) Act, 1931.	In part, namely,— Section eighteen subsection one.
21 & 22 Geo. 5. c. 34	Isle of Man (Customs) Act 1931	The Isle of Man (Customs) Act, 1931.	In part, namely,— Section two so far as unrepealed.
21 & 22 Geo. 5. c. 35	British Sugar Industry (Assistance) Act 1931	The British Sugar Industry (Assistance) Act, 1931.	The whole act.
21 & 22 Geo. 5. c. 41	Agricultural Land (Utilisation) Act 1931	The Agricultural Land (Utilisation) Act, 1931.	In part, namely,— Sections five; six and seven. Section twelve subsection two. Schedule one so far as unrepealed.
21 & 22 Geo. 5. c. 44	Small Landholders and Agricultural Holdings (Scotland) Act 1931	The Small Landholders and Agricultural Holdings (Scotland) Act, 1931.	In part, namely,— Sections three subsection two; twenty-four; forty-one subsection two and schedule two.
21 & 22 Geo. 5. c. 45	Local Government (Clerks) Act 1931	The Local Government (Clerks) Act, 1931.	In part, namely,— Section thirteen subsection two.
21 & 22 Geo. 5. c. 46	Gold Standard (Amendment) Act 1931	The Gold Standard (Amendment) Act, 1931.	In part, namely,— Section one subsection three.
21 & 22 Geo. 5. c. 47	Public Works Loans Act 1931	The Public Works Loans Act, 1931.	The whole act.
21 & 22 Geo. 5. c. 49	Finance (No. 2) Act 1931	The Finance (No. 2) Act, 1931.	In part, namely,— Section two subsections one and two. Sections six and seven. Sections twenty-four; twenty-five subsection five. Schedule one Parts one and two. Schedule five.
21 & 22 Geo. 5. c. 50	Appropriation (No. 2) Act 1931	The Appropriation (No. 2) Act, 1931.	The whole act.
21 & 22 Geo. 5. c. 51	Foodstuffs (Prevention of Exploitation) Act 1931	The Foodstuffs (Prevention of Exploitation) Act, 1931.	The whole act.
22 & 23 Geo. 5. c. 1	Abnormal Importations (Customs Duties) Act 1931	The Abnormal Importations (Customs Duties) Act, 1931.	The whole act.
22 & 23 Geo. 5. c. 2	Expiring Laws Act 1931	The Expiring Laws Act, 1931.	In part, namely,— Section two and schedule two.
22 & 23 Geo. 5. c. 3	Horticultural Products (Emergency Customs Duties) Act 1931	The Horticultural Products (Emergency Customs Duties) Act, 1931.	The whole act.
22 & 23 Geo. 5. c. 7	Indian Pay (Temporary Abatements) Act 1931	The Indian Pay (Temporary Abatements) Act, 1931.	The whole act.
22 & 23 Geo. 5. c. 9	Merchant Shipping (Safety and Load Line Conventions) Act 1932	The Merchant Shipping (Safety and Load Line Conventions) Act, 1932.	In part, namely,— Sections twenty-four subsection six and thirty-five subsection five. Section thirty-nine subsection one. Sections thirty-nine subsection two; sixty-seven subsection two to " Provided that " and seventy-four subsection two and schedule four.
22 & 23 Geo. 5. c. 13	Financial Emergency Enactments (Continuance) Act 1932	The Financial Emergency Enactments (Continuance) Act, 1932.	The whole act.
22 & 23 Geo. 5. c. 14	Consolidated Fund (No. 1) Act 1932	The Consolidated Fund (No. 1) Act, 1932.	The whole act.
22 & 23 Geo. 5. c. 15	Dangerous Drugs Act 1932	The Dangerous Drugs Act, 1932.	In part, namely,— Section five subsection three. Section five subsection four.
22 & 23 Geo. 5. c. 18	Rating and Valuation Act 1932	The Rating and Valuation Act, 1932.	In part, namely,— Section one subsection two.
22 & 23 Geo. 5. c. 20	Chancel Repairs Act 1932	The Chancel Repairs Act, 1932.	In part, namely,— Section five subsection three.
22 & 23 Geo. 5. c. 21	President of the Board of Trade Act 1932	The President of the Board of Trade Act, 1932.	The whole act so far as unrepealed.
22 & 23 Geo. 5. c. 22	Army and Air Force (Annual) Act 1932	The Army and Air Force (Annual) Act, 1932.	In part, namely,— Preamble; sections two and three. Section fifteen subsection five. Schedule one. Schedule four.
22 & 23 Geo. 5. c. 23	Grey Seals Protection Act 1932	The Grey Seals Protection Act, 1932.	In part, namely,— Section three subsection two.
22 & 23 Geo. 5. c. 24	Wheat Act 1932	The Wheat Act, 1932.	In part, namely,— Section nineteen.
22 & 23 Geo. 5. c. 25	Finance Act 1932	The Finance Act, 1932.	In part, namely,— Section one subsection two. Sections three subsection two; and five subsection six. Section six. Sections fifteen and sixteen.
22 & 23 Geo. 5. c. 26	Universities (Scotland) Act 1932	The Universities (Scotland) Act, 1932.	In part, namely,— Section seven subsection two and schedule.
22 & 23 Geo. 5. c. 32	Patents and Designs Act 1932	The Patents and Designs Act, 1932.	In part, namely,— Section fifteen subsection two.
22 & 23 Geo. 5. c. 37	Solicitors Act 1932	The Solicitors Act, 1932.	In part, namely,— Section eighty-two subsection one. Section eighty-three subsection two. Schedule four.
22 & 23 Geo. 5. c. 41	Isle of Man (Customs) (No. 2) Act 1932	The Isle of Man (Customs) (No. 2) Act, 1932.	In part, namely,— Sections seven and eleven. Section fourteen subsection three and schedule two.
22 & 23 Geo. 5. c. 42	Public Works Loans Act 1932	The Public Works Loans Act, 1932.	The whole act.
22 & 23 Geo. 5. c. 45	Rights of Way Act 1932	The Rights of Way Act, 1932.	In part, namely,— Section six.
22 & 23 Geo. 5. c. 46	Children and Young Persons Act 1932	The Children and Young Persons Act, 1932.	In part, namely,— Section ninety subsection three.
22 & 23 Geo. 5. c. 47	Children and Young Persons (Scotland) Act 1932	The Children and Young Persons (Scotland) Act, 1932.	In part, namely,— Section eighty-three subsection three.
22 & 23 Geo. 5. c. 50	Appropriation Act 1932	The Appropriation Act, 1932.	The whole act.
22 & 23 Geo. 5. c. 51	Sunday Entertainments Act 1932	The Sunday Entertainments Act, 1932.	In part, namely,— Section six subsection two.
22 & 23 Geo. 5. c. 53	Ottawa Agreements Act 1932	The Ottawa Agreements Act, 1932.	In part, namely,— Section fourteen subsection two.
22 & 23 Geo. 5. c. 54	Transitional Payments (Determination of Need) Act 1932	The Transitional Payments (Determination of Need) Act, 1932.	The whole act.
22 & 23 Geo. 5. c. 55	Administration of Justice Act 1932	The Administration of Justice Act, 1932.	In part, namely,— Section one subsection two.
23 & 24 Geo. 5. c. 1	Consolidated Fund (No. 1) Act 1932	The Consolidated Fund (No. 1) Act, 1932.	The whole act.
23 & 24 Geo. 5. c. 2	Expiring Laws Continuance Act 1932	The Expiring Laws Continuance Act, 1932.	The whole act.
23 & 24 Geo. 5. c. 3	Consolidated Fund (No. 2) Act 1933	The Consolidated Fund (No. 2) Act, 1933.	The whole act.
23 & 24 Geo. 5. c. 7	Indian Pay (Temporary Abatements) Act 1933	The Indian Pay (Temporary Abatements) Act, 1933.	The whole act.
23 & 24 Geo. 5. c. 10	Russian Goods (Import Prohibition) Act 1933	The Russian Goods (Import Prohibition) Act, 1933.	In part, namely,— Section four subsection two.
23 & 24 Geo. 5. c. 11	Army and Air Force (Annual) Act 1933	The Army and Air Force (Annual) Act, 1933.	In part, namely,— Preamble; sections two; three and schedule.
23 & 24 Geo. 5. c. 12	Children and Young Persons Act 1933	The Children and Young Persons Act, 1933.	In part, namely,— Section one hundred and nine subsection two. Section one hundred and nine subsection four and schedule six.
23 & 24 Geo. 5. c. 14	London Passenger Transport Act 1933	The London Passenger Transport Act, 1933.	In part, namely,— Section twenty-seven. Section fifty. Section fifty-six. Section eighty-two subsection two. Section one hundred and eight. Schedule eleven so far as it relates to schedule three Part I, of the Road Traffic Act, 1930. Schedule sixteen.
23 & 24 Geo. 5. c. 15	Housing (Financial Provisions) Act 1933	The Housing (Financial Provisions) Act, 1933.	The whole act so far as unrepealed.
23 & 24 Geo. 5. c. 18	Exchange Equalisation Account Act 1933	The Exchange Equalisation Account Act, 1933.	The whole act.
23 & 24 Geo. 5. c. 19	Finance Act 1933	The Finance Act, 1933.	In part, namely,— Section one subsections one to six and seven to " Provided that ". Section two subsection one. Sections seven subsection five; and eight subsection four. Sections fourteen subsection four; fifteen subsection three; sixteen subsection six to " effect, and " and twenty-three subsection two. Sections twenty-seven; twenty-eight and thirty. Section thirty-one subsection two. Sections thirty-six and thirty-seven. Section forty-seven subsection seven and schedule eight.
23 & 24 Geo. 5. c. 20	False Oaths (Scotland) Act 1933	The False Oaths (Scotland) Act, 1933.	In part, namely,— Section eight and schedule.
23 & 24 Geo. 5. c. 21	Solicitors (Scotland) Act 1933	The Solicitors (Scotland) Act, 1933.	In part, namely,— Section fifty-one. Section fifty-two from " Part I " to the end of the section. Schedule three.
23 & 24 Geo. 5. c. 22	Teachers (Superannuation) Act 1933	The Teachers (Superannuation) Act, 1933.	The whole act so far as unrepealed.
23 & 24 Geo. 5. c. 24	Solicitors Act 1933	The Solicitors Act, 1933.	In part, namely,— Section nine subsection three.
23 & 24 Geo. 5. c. 25	Pharmacy and Poisons Act 1933	The Pharmacy and Poisons Act, 1933.	In part, namely,— Section thirty-one subsection two. Section thirty-one subsection four and schedule three.
23 & 24 Geo. 5. c. 27	Blind Voters Act 1933	The Blind Voters Act, 1933.	In part, namely,— Section two subsection two.
23 & 24 Geo. 5. c. 30	Cotton Industry Act 1933	The Cotton Industry Act, 1933.	The whole act.
23 & 24 Geo. 5. c. 31	Agricultural Marketing Act 1933	The Agricultural Marketing Act, 1933.	In part, namely,— Sections fourteen subsection four and thirty subsection two and schedule four.
23 & 24 Geo. 5. c. 32	Rent and Mortgage Interest Restrictions (Amendment) Act 1933	The Rent and Mortgage Interest Restrictions (Amendment) Act, 1933.	In part, namely,— Section eighteen subsection three and schedule three.
23 & 24 Geo. 5. c. 34	Appropriation Act 1933	The Appropriation Act, 1933.	The whole act.
23 & 24 Geo. 5. c. 36	Administration of Justice (Miscellaneous Provisions) Act 1933	The Administration of Justice (Miscellaneous Provisions) Act, 1933.	In part, namely,— Section ten subsection three. Section ten subsection four. Schedule three.
23 & 24 Geo. 5. c. 38	Summary Jurisdiction (Appeals) Act 1933	The Summary Jurisdiction (Appeals) Act, 1933.	In part, namely,— Section eleven subsection two. Schedule.
23 & 24 Geo. 5. c. 39	Slaughter of Animals Act 1933	The Slaughter of Animals Act, 1933.	In part, namely,— Section ten subsection three.
23 & 24 Geo. 5. c. 40	Isle of Man (Customs) Act 1933	The Isle of Man (Customs) Act, 1933.	In part, namely,— Section six. Sections twelve subsection four and thirteen subsection three. Section twenty. Section twenty-one subsection three and schedule six.
23 & 24 Geo. 5. c. 41	Administration of Justice (Scotland) Act 1933	The Administration of Justice (Scotland) Act, 1933.	In part, namely,— Section forty-one subsection two. The Schedule.
23 & 24 Geo. 5. c. 48	Expiring Laws Continuance Act 1933	The Expiring Laws Continuance Act, 1933.	The whole act so far as unrepealed.
23 & 24 Geo. 5. c. 51	Local Government Act 1933	The Local Government Act, 1933.	In part, namely,— Section three hundred and four. Section three hundred and seven subsection one to " Provided that ". Section three hundred and eight subsection one from " and shall " to the end of the subsection. Schedule ten. Schedule eleven.
23 & 24 Geo. 5. c. 52	Protection of Birds Act 1933	The Protection of Birds Act, 1933.	In part, namely,— Section two subsection two.
23 & 24 Geo. 5. c. 53	Road and Rail Traffic Act 1933	The Road and Rail Traffic Act, 1933.	In part, namely,— Sections forty-one subsection four; forty-seven subsection three and forty-eight. Section forty-nine subsection two. Schedule three.
24 & 25 Geo. 5. c. 2	Newfoundland Act 1933	The Newfoundland Act, 1933.	In part, namely,— Section five.
24 & 25 Geo. 5. c. 3	Consolidated Fund (No. 1) Act 1934	The Consolidated Fund (No. 1) Act, 1934.	The whole act.
24 & 25 Geo. 5. c. 8	Indian Pay (Temporary Abatements) Act 1934	The Indian Pay (Temporary Abatements) Act, 1934.	The whole act.
24 & 25 Geo. 5. c. 9	Mining Industry (Welfare Fund) Act 1934	The Mining Industry (Welfare Fund) Act, 1934.	In part, namely,— Section three subsection two paragraph (b).
24 & 25 Geo. 5. c. 11	Army and Air Force (Annual) Act 1934	The Army and Air Force (Annual) Act, 1934.	In part, namely,— Preamble; sections two; three and schedule one.
24 & 25 Geo. 5. c. 14	Arbitration Act 1934	The Arbitration Act, 1934.	In part, namely,— Section twenty-one subsection six. Section twenty-one subsection seven. Schedule three.
24 & 25 Geo. 5. c. 18	Illegal Trawling (Scotland) Act 1934	The Illegal Trawling (Scotland) Act, 1934.	In part, namely,— Section seven and schedule.
24 & 25 Geo. 5. c. 19	Registration of Births, Deaths and Marriages (Scotland) (Amendment) Act 1934	The Registration of Births, Deaths and Marriages (Scotland) (Amendment) Act, 1934.	In part, namely,— Section seven subsection two.
24 & 25 Geo. 5. c. 20	Water Supplies (Exceptional Shortage) Orders Act 1934	The Water Supplies (Exceptional Shortage) Orders Act, 1934.	The whole act except sections one subsection five; three subsection eight and twelve subsection one.
24 & 25 Geo. 5. c. 22	Assessor of Public Undertakings (Scotland) Act 1934	The Assessor of Public Undertakings (Scotland) Act, 1934.	In part, namely,— Section four.
24 & 25 Geo. 5. c. 32	Finance Act 1934	The Finance Act, 1934.	In part, namely,— Sections one subsection three; two subsection five and three subsection two. Section three subsection three. Sections four subsection two and six subsection three. Sections nineteen and twenty. Sections twenty-one subsection five; twenty-seven; thirty subsection seven and schedule four.
24 & 25 Geo. 5. c. 35	Land Settlement (Scotland) Act 1934	The Land Settlement (Scotland) Act, 1934.	The whole act.
24 & 25 Geo. 5. c. 37	Trustees Savings Banks (Special Investments) Act 1934	The Trustees Savings Banks (Special Investments) Act, 1934.	In part, namely,— Section two subsection two.
24 & 25 Geo. 5. c. 39	British Sugar (Subsidy) Act 1934	The British Sugar (Subsidy) Act, 1934.	The whole act.
24 & 25 Geo. 5. c. 41	Law Reform (Miscellaneous Provisions) Act 1934	Law Reform (Miscellaneous Provisions) Act, 1934.	In part, namely,— Sections one subsection seven and three subsection two.
24 & 25 Geo. 5. c. 42	Shops Act 1934	The Shops Act, 1934.	In part, namely,— Section sixteen. Section eighteen subsection four. Schedule.
24 & 25 Geo. 5. c. 44	Appropriation Act 1934	The Appropriation Act, 1934.	The whole act.
24 & 25 Geo. 5. c. 46	Isle of Man (Customs) Act 1934	The Isle of Man (Customs) Act, 1934.	In part, namely,— Section one subsection two. Section two. Section three subsection four. Section four.
24 & 25 Geo. 5. c. 48	Public Works Loans Act 1934	The Public Works Loans Act, 1934.	The whole act.
24 & 25 Geo. 5. c. 49	Whaling Industry Act 1934	The Whaling Industry Act, 1934.	In part, namely,— Section nineteen subsection two.
24 & 25 Geo. 5. c. 50	Road Traffic Act 1934	The Road Traffic Act, 1934.	In part, namely,— Section forty-two subsection three.
24 & 25 Geo. 5. c. 51	Milk Act 1934	The Milk Act, 1934.	In part, namely,— Sections two; three; five; six and seven; and, so far as unrepealed, sections one; four and eight. Section eleven. Section fourteen subsection two.
24 & 25 Geo. 5. c. 53	County Courts Act 1934	The County Courts Act, 1934.	In part, namely,— Section one hundred and ninety-three subsection three. Section one hundred and ninety-three subsection four and schedule five.
24 & 25 Geo. 5. c. 54	Cattle Industry (Emergency Provisions) Act 1934	The Cattle Industry (Emergency Provisions) Act, 1934.	In part, namely,— Sections two and three.
24 & 25 Geo. 5. c. 57	Expiring Laws Continuance Act 1934	The Expiring Laws Continuance Act, 1934.	The whole act.
24 & 25 Geo. 5. c. 58	Betting and Lotteries Act 1934	The Betting and Lotteries Act, 1934.	In part, namely,— Sections fifteen subsection five and thirty-two. Section thirty-three subsection two. Schedule two.
25 & 26 Geo. 5. c. 4	Consolidated Fund (No. 1) Act 1935	The Consolidated Fund (No. 1) Act, 1935.	The whole act.
25 & 26 Geo. 5. c. 6	Unemployment Assistance (Temporary Provisions) Act 1935	The Unemployment Assistance (Temporary Provisions) Act, 1935.	The whole act.
25 & 26 Geo. 5. c. 7	British Shipping (Assistance) Act 1935	The British Shipping (Assistance) Act, 1935.	The whole act.
25 & 26 Geo. 5. c. 10	Consolidated Fund (No. 2) Act 1935	The Consolidated Fund (No. 2) Act, 1935.	The whole act.
25 & 26 Geo. 5. c. 12	Cattle Industry (Emergency Provisions) Act 1935	The Cattle Industry (Emergency Provisions) Act, 1935.	The whole act.
25 & 26 Geo. 5. c. 15	Post Office (Amendment) Act 1935	The Post Office (Amendment) Act, 1935.	In part, namely,— Sections two subsection one; four subsection two; sixteen subsection two and schedule two.
25 & 26 Geo. 5. c. 17	Army and Air Force (Annual) Act 1935	The Army and Air Force (Annual) Act, 1935.	In part, namely,— Preamble; sections two; three and schedule one.
25 & 26 Geo. 5. c. 19	Land Drainage (Scotland) Act 1935	The Land Drainage (Scotland) Act, 1935.	The whole act.
25 & 26 Geo. 5. c. 20	Vagrancy Act 1935	The Vagrancy Act, 1935.	In part, namely,— Section one subsection two.
25 & 26 Geo. 5. c. 21	Northern Ireland Land Purchase (Winding Up) Act 1935	The Northern Ireland Land Purchase (Winding Up) Act, 1935.	In part, namely,— Section fifteen subsection three.
25 & 26 Geo. 5. c. 22	Unemployment Assistance (Temporary Provisions) (No. 2) Act 1935	The Unemployment Assistance (Temporary Provisions) (No. 2) Act, 1935.	The whole act.
25 & 26 Geo. 5. c. 23	Superannuation Act 1935	The Superannuation Act, 1935.	In part, namely,— Section five.
25 & 26 Geo. 5. c. 24	Finance Act 1935	The Finance Act, 1935.	In part, namely,— Section one subsection five. Sections eight subsection two; nine subsection two and twelve subsection two. Sections seventeen; eighteen and twenty-four. Section thirty-four subsection five. Section thirty-four subsection six. Section thirty-five subsection seven and schedule two.
25 & 26 Geo. 5. c. 25	Counterfeit Currency (Convention) Act 1935	The Counterfeit Currency (Convention) Act, 1935.	In part, namely,— Section six subsection six.
25 & 26 Geo. 5. c. 28	Appropriation Act 1935	The Appropriation Act, 1935.	The whole act.
25 & 26 Geo. 5. c. 30	Law Reform (Married Women and Tortfeasors) Act 1935	The Law Reform (Married Women and Tortfeasors) Act, 1935.	In part, namely,— Section five subsection two. Section seven. Schedule two.
25 & 26 Geo. 5. c. 31	Diseases of Animals Act 1935	The Diseases of Animals Act, 1935.	In part, namely,— Section nineteen subsection three and schedule two.
25 & 26 Geo. 5. c. 34	Isle of Man (Customs) Act 1935	The Isle of Man (Customs) Act, 1935.	In part, namely,— Section one subsection three. Section three. Section nine subsection two and schedule.
25 & 26 Geo. 5. c. 37	British Sugar (Subsidy) Act 1935	The British Sugar (Subsidy) Act, 1935.	The whole act.
25 & 26 Geo. 5. c. 39	Cattle Industry (Emergency Provisions) (No. 2) Act 1935	The Cattle Industry (Emergency Provisions) (No. 2) Act, 1935.	The whole act.
25 & 26 Geo. 5. c. 40	Housing Act 1935	The Housing Act, 1935.	In part, namely,— Section thirty-seven subsections one and two.
25 & 26 Geo. 5. c. 41	Housing (Scotland) Act 1935	The Housing (Scotland) Act, 1935.	In part, namely,— Section nineteen subsection one. Section thirty-four subsections one and two. Sections forty-eight subsection one; fifty-nine subsection two; sixty-nine subsection two and eighty-eight to " Provided that " and schedule six.
25 & 26 Geo. 5. c. 43	Salmon and Freshwater Fisheries Act 1935	The Salmon and Freshwater Fisheries Act, 1935.	In part, namely,— Section three.
25 & 26 Geo. 5. c. 46	Money Payments (Justices Procedure) Act 1935	The Money Payments (Justices Procedure) Act, 1935.	In part, namely,— Sections five subsection four; seven; ten subsection four and sixteen subsection two. Section sixteen subsection three. Schedule.
26 Geo. 5 & 1 Edw. 8. c. 4	Expiring Laws Continuance Act 1935	The Expiring Laws Continuance Act, 1935.	The whole act.
26 Geo. 5 & 1 Edw. 8. c. 5	Public Works Loans Act 1935	The Public Works Loans Act, 1935.	In part, namely,— Section one. Sections two; three; four; five subsection three and schedule.
26 Geo. 5 & 1 Edw. 8. c. 7	Unemployment Assistance (Temporary Provisions) (Extension) Act 1936	The Unemployment Assistance (Temporary Provisions) (Extension) Act, 1936.	The whole act.
26 Geo. 5 & 1 Edw. 8. c. 8	Consolidated Fund (No. 1) Act 1936	The Consolidated Fund (No. 1) Act, 1936.	The whole act.
26 Geo. 5 & 1 Edw. 8. c. 9	Milk (Extension of Temporary Provisions) Act 1936	The Milk (Extension of Temporary Provisions) Act, 1936.	The whole act.
26 Geo. 5 & 1 Edw. 8. c. 11	Consolidated Fund (No. 2) Act 1936	The Consolidated Fund (No. 2) Act, 1936.	The whole act.
26 Geo. 5 & 1 Edw. 8. c. 12	British Shipping (Continuance of Subsidy) Act 1936	The British Shipping (Continuance of Subsidy) Act, 1936.	The whole act.
26 Geo. 5 & 1 Edw. 8. c. 14	Army and Air Force (Annual) Act 1936	The Army and Air Force (Annual) Act, 1936.	In part, namely,— Preamble; sections two; three and schedule.
26 Geo. 5 & 1 Edw. 8. c. 15	Civil List Act 1936	The Civil List Act, 1936.	In part, namely,— Sections one; two; three; four; five; six; seven; ten and section thirteen except subsection five. Schedule.
26 Geo. 5 & 1 Edw. 8. c. 16	Coinage Offences Act 1936	The Coinage Offences Act, 1936.	In part, namely,— Section eighteen subsection two. Section eighteen subsection three. Schedule.
26 Geo. 5 & 1 Edw. 8. c. 18	Sugar Industry (Reorganization) Act 1936	The Sugar Industry (Reorganization) Act, 1936.	In part, namely,— Sections three subsection two and five subsection three. Section fourteen subsection one the proviso. Section sixteen; schedule one Part two and schedule two.
26 Geo. 5 & 1 Edw. 8. c. 22	Hours of Employment (Conventions) Act 1936	The Hours of Employment (Conventions) Act, 1936.	In part, namely,— Section six subsection two.
26 Geo. 5 & 1 Edw. 8. c. 24	Employment of Women and Young Persons Act 1936	The Employment of Women and Young Persons Act, 1936.	In part, namely,— Section five subsection two.
26 Geo. 5 & 1 Edw. 8. c. 25	Pensions (Governors of Dominions etc.) Act 1936	The Pensions (Governors of Dominions etc.) Act, 1936.	In part, namely,— Section one subsection five.
26 Geo. 5 & 1 Edw. 8. c. 26	Land Registration Act 1936	The Land Registration Act, 1936.	In part, namely,— Sections three subsections two and four; five subsection two from " and subsection (4) " to the end of the subsection and nine subsection two and schedule.
26 Geo. 5 & 1 Edw. 8. c. 28	Shops Act 1936	The Shops Act, 1936.	In part, namely,— Section two subsection three.
26 Geo. 5 & 1 Edw. 8. c. 29	Malta (Letters Patent) Act 1936	The Malta (Letters Patent) Act, 1936.	In part, namely,— Section three subsection one from " and shall " to the end of the subsection. Section three subsection two.
26 Geo. 5 & 1 Edw. 8. c. 30	Retail Meat Dealers Shops (Sunday Closing) Act 1936	The Retail Meat Dealers Shops (Sunday Closing) Act, 1936.	In part, namely,— Section eight subsection one from " and shall " to the end of the subsection.
26 Geo. 5 & 1 Edw. 8. c. 31	Old Age Pensions Act 1936	The Old Age Pensions Act, 1936.	In part, namely,— Section fourteen to " Provided that ". Section sixteen subsection one. Schedule two.
26 Geo. 5 & 1 Edw. 8. c. 34	Finance Act 1936	The Finance Act, 1936.	In part, namely,— Section one subsection four. Section two. Section three subsection two. Section four so far as unrepealed and sections fourteen and fifteen. Sections thirty-three subsection two; thirty-five subsection seven; schedule three Part II and schedule four.
26 Geo. 5 & 1 Edw. 8. c. 35	Solicitors Act 1936	The Solicitors Act, 1936.	In part, namely,— Section seven subsection three last sentence and subsection four last sentence; and section nine subsection two. Sections ten and eleven. Section seventeen subsection two.
26 Geo. 5 & 1 Edw. 8. c. 37	Appropriation Act 1936	The Appropriation Act, 1936.	The whole act.
26 Geo. 5 & 1 Edw. 8. c. 38	Weights and Measures Act 1936	The Weights and Measures Act, 1936.	In part, namely,— Section thirteen subsection two.
26 Geo. 5 & 1 Edw. 8. c. 40	Midwives Act 1936	The Midwives Act, 1936.	In part, namely,— Section five subsections one to seven.
26 Geo. 5 & 1 Edw. 8. c. 43	Tithe Act 1936	The Tithe Act, 1936.	In part, namely,— Section forty-eight subsection three and schedule nine.
26 Geo. 5 & 1 Edw. 8. c. 44	Air Navigation Act 1936	The Air Navigation Act, 1936.	In part, namely,— Section thirty-five subsection two and schedule seven.
26 Geo. 5 & 1 Edw. 8. c. 45	Isle of Man (Customs) Act 1936	The Isle of Man (Customs) Act, 1936.	In part, namely,— Section two. Sections three subsection two; and five subsection three. Section eleven subsection two and schedule two.
26 Geo. 5 & 1 Edw. 8. c. 46	Cattle Industry (Emergency Provisions) Act 1936	The Cattle Industry (Emergency Provisions) Act, 1936.	The whole act.
26 Geo. 5 & 1 Edw. 8. c. 47	Crown Lands Act 1936	The Crown Lands Act, 1936.	In part, namely,— Sections eight subsection five; ten subsection four and schedule two.
26 Geo. 5 & 1 Edw. 8. c. 48	Health Resorts and Watering Places Act 1936	The Health Resorts and Watering Places Act, 1936.	In part, namely,— Section two subsection three.
26 Geo. 5 & 1 Edw. 8. c. 49	Public Health Act 1936	The Public Health Act, 1936.	In part, namely,— Section three hundred and forty-six subsection one to " Provided that ". Section three hundred and forty-six subsection one the proviso paragraphs (e) and (f). Section three hundred and forty-seven subsection one from " and shall " to the end of the subsection. Schedule three.
26 Geo. 5 & 1 Edw. 8. c. 50	Public Health (London) Act 1936	The Public Health (London) Act, 1936.	In part, namely,— Section three hundred and eight. Section three hundred and nine subsection two. Schedule seven.
26 Geo. 5 & 1 Edw. 8. c. 51	Housing Act 1936	The Housing Act, 1936.	In part, namely,— Section one hundred and ninety. Section one hundred and ninety-one subsection two. Schedule twelve.
26 Geo. 5 & 1 Edw. 8. c. 52	Private Legislation Procedure (Scotland) Act 1936	The Private Legislation Procedure (Scotland) Act, 1936.	In part, namely,— Section nineteen to " Provided that " and schedule.
26 Geo. 5 & 1 Edw. 8. c. 53	Shops (Sunday Trading Restrictions) Act 1936	The Shops (Sunday Trading Restrictions) Act, 1936.	In part, namely,— Section sixteen subsection three. Section sixteen subsection four and schedule four.
1 Edw. 8 & 1 Geo. 6. c. 1	Merchant Shipping (Carriage of Munitions to Spain) Act 1936	The Merchant Shipping (Carriage of Munitions to Spain) Act, 1936.	The whole act.
1 Edw. 8 & 1 Geo. 6. c. 4	Expiring Laws Continuance Act 1936	The Expiring Laws Continuance Act, 1936.	The whole act.
1 Edw. 8 & 1 Geo. 6. c. 5	Trunk Roads Act 1936	The Trunk Roads Act, 1936.	In part, namely,— Section one subsections five and six and section five subsection four.
1 Edw. 8 & 1 Geo. 6. c. 6	Public Order Act 1936	The Public Order Act, 1936.	In part, namely,— Section ten subsection three.
1 Edw. 8 & 1 Geo. 6. c. 7	Consolidated Fund (No. 1) Act 1937	The Consolidated Fund (No. 1) Act, 1937.	The whole act.
1 Edw. 8 & 1 Geo. 6. c. 8	Beef and Veal Customs Duties Act 1937	The Beef and Veal Customs Duties Act, 1937.	In part, namely,— Section one subsection six.
1 Edw. 8 & 1 Geo. 6. c. 10	Unemployment Assistance (Temporary Provisions) (Amendment) Act 1937	The Unemployment Assistance (Temporary Provisions) (Amendment) Act, 1937.	The whole act.
1 Edw. 8 & 1 Geo. 6. c. 11	Public Works Loans Act 1937	The Public Works Loans Act, 1937.	The whole act.
1 Edw. 8 & 1 Geo. 6. c. 12	Firearms Act 1937	The Firearms Act, 1937.	In part, namely,— Section thirty-one. Section thirty-four subsection two. Section thirty-four subsection four. Schedule four.
1 Edw. 8 & 1 Geo. 6. c. 14	East India Loans Act 1937	The East India Loans Act, 1937.	In part, namely,— Section nine. Section twelve subsection two. Section twelve subsection three and schedule two.
1 Edw. 8 & 1 Geo. 6. c. 16	Regency Act 1937	The Regency Act, 1937.	In part, namely,— Section seven.
1 Edw. 8 & 1 Geo. 6. c. 19	Merchant Shipping (Spanish Frontiers Observation) Act 1937	The Merchant Shipping (Spanish Frontiers Observation) Act, 1937.	The whole act.
1 Edw. 8 & 1 Geo. 6. c. 20	Consolidated Fund (No. 2) Act 1937	The Consolidated Fund (No. 2) Act, 1937.	The whole act.
1 Edw. 8 & 1 Geo. 6. c. 21	British Shipping (Continuance of Subsidy) Act 1937	The British Shipping (Continuance of Subsidy) Act, 1937.	The whole act.
1 Edw. 8 & 1 Geo. 6. c. 23	Merchant Shipping Act 1937	The Merchant Shipping Act, 1937.	In part, namely,— Section two.
1 Edw. 8 & 1 Geo. 6. c. 26	Army and Air Force (Annual) Act 1937	The Army and Air Force (Annual) Act, 1937.	In part, namely,— Preamble; sections two; three and schedule one.
1 Edw. 8 & 1 Geo. 6. c. 27	County Councils Association Expenses (Amendment) Act 1937	The County Councils Association Expenses (Amendment) Act, 1937.	The whole act.
1 Edw. 8 & 1 Geo. 6. c. 30	Maternity Services (Scotland) Act 1937	The Maternity Services (Scotland) Act, 1937.	In part, namely,— Section ten subsection one from " and shall " to the end of the subsection.
1 Edw. 8 & 1 Geo. 6. c. 33	Diseases of Fish Act 1937	The Diseases of Fish Act, 1937.	In part, namely,— Section fourteen subsection two.
1 Edw. 8 & 1 Geo. 6. c. 37	Children and Young Persons (Scotland) Act 1937	The Children and Young Persons (Scotland) Act, 1937.	In part, namely,— Section one hundred and thirteen subsection two. Section one hundred and thirteen subsection four and schedule four.
1 Edw. 8 & 1 Geo. 6. c. 38	Ministers of the Crown Act 1937	The Ministers of the Crown Act, 1937.	In part, namely,— Section eleven subsection two and schedule four.
1 Edw. 8 & 1 Geo. 6. c. 40	Public Health (Drainage of Trade Premises) Act 1937	The Public Health (Drainage of Trade Premises) Act, 1937.	In part, namely,— Section one subsection three. Sections seven subsection six; nine subsection four; twelve subsection five and fifteen subsection three.
1 Edw. 8 & 1 Geo. 6. c. 42	Exportation of Horses Act 1937	The Exportation of Horses Act, 1937.	In part, namely,— Section two subsection two.
1 Edw. 8 & 1 Geo. 6. c. 43	Public Records (Scotland) Act 1937	The Public Records (Scotland) Act, 1937.	In part, namely,— Sections fifteen and sixteen and schedule two.
1 Edw. 8 & 1 Geo. 6. c. 46	Physical Training and Recreation Act 1937	The Physical Training and Recreation Act, 1937.	In part, namely,— Section eleven subsection two and schedule.
1 Edw. 8 & 1 Geo. 6. c. 47	Teachers (Superannuation) Act 1937	The Teachers (Superannuation) Act, 1937.	In part, namely,— Sections two subsection five; five subsection two and schedule.
1 Edw. 8 & 1 Geo. 6. c. 48	Methylated Spirits (Sale by Retail) (Scotland) Act 1937	The Methylated Spirits (Sale by Retail) (Scotland) Act, 1937.	In part, namely,— Section eight subsection two.
1 Edw. 8 & 1 Geo. 6. c. 50	Livestock Industry Act 1937	The Livestock Industry Act, 1937.	In part, namely,— Section nine. Section thirty-eight subsection two the proviso.
1 Edw. 8 & 1 Geo. 6. c. 53	Agricultural Wages (Regulation) (Scotland) Act 1937	The Agricultural Wages (Regulation) (Scotland) Act, 1937.	In part, namely,— Section sixteen.
1 Edw. 8 & 1 Geo. 6. c. 54	Finance Act 1937	The Finance Act, 1937.	In part, namely,— Sections one and two. Section three subsection five. Section three subsection six. Sections five subsection three and six subsection two. Sections ten; eleven; sixteen and twenty-seven. Sections twenty-eight subsection three; thirty-four subsection six and schedule six.
1 Edw. 8 & 1 Geo. 6. c. 55	Appropriation Act 1937	The Appropriation Act, 1937.	The whole act.
1 Edw. 8 & 1 Geo. 6. c. 57	Matrimonial Causes Act 1937	The Matrimonial Causes Act, 1937.	In part, namely,— Section ten subsection five. Section fourteen subsection two.
1 Edw. 8 & 1 Geo. 6. c. 58	Summary Procedure (Domestic Proceedings) Act 1937	The Summary Procedure (Domestic Proceedings) Act, 1937.	In part, namely,— Section ten subsection four.
1 Edw. 8 & 1 Geo. 6. c. 62	Coal Mines (Employment of Boys) Act 1937	The Coal Mines (Employment of Boys) Act, 1937.	In part, namely,— Section one subsection one the last sentence.
1 Edw. 8 & 1 Geo. 6. c. 63	Nigerian (Remission of Payments) Act 1937	The Nigerian (Remission of Payments) Act, 1937.	The whole act.
1 Edw. 8 & 1 Geo. 6. c. 64	Isle of Man (Customs) Act 1937	The Isle of Man (Customs) Act, 1937.	In part, namely,— Section one. Section three subsection five.
1 Edw. 8 & 1 Geo. 6. c. 66	Milk (Amendment) Act 1937	The Milk (Amendment) Act, 1937.	In part, namely,— Sections one; two; three; four; five; six and section eight subsection two. Section nine subsection two. Schedule one, except the amendment to s. 12 of the Principal Act contained in Part I of the schedule. Schedule two.
1 Edw. 8 & 1 Geo. 6. c. 67	Factories Act 1937	The Factories Act, 1937.	In part, namely,— Section one hundred and fifty-nine subsection one to " Provided that ". Section one hundred and sixty subsection two. Schedule four.
1 Edw. 8 & 1 Geo. 6. c. 68	Local Government Superannuation Act 1937	The Local Government Superannuation Act, 1937.	In part, namely,— Section forty-one subsection one and schedule four.
1 Edw. 8 & 1 Geo. 6. c. 69	Local Government Superannuation (Scotland) Act 1937	The Local Government Superannuation (Scotland) Act, 1937.	In part, namely,— Section twenty-eight subsection one. Section thirty-five subsection one.
1 Edw. 8 & 1 Geo. 6. c. 70	Agriculture Act 1937	The Agriculture Act, 1937.	In part, namely,— Section thirteen subsection three. Sections eighteen subsection two and thirty-four subsection three. Section thirty-four subsection four. Schedule two so far as relates to the Milk and Dairies (Consolidation) Act, 1915. Schedule three.
1 & 2 Geo. 6. c. 1	Expiring Laws Continuance Act 1937	The Expiring Laws Continuance Act, 1937.	The whole act.
1 & 2 Geo. 6. c. 6	Air-Raid Precautions Act 1937	The Air-Raid Precautions Act, 1937.	In part, namely,— Section ten.
1 & 2 Geo. 6. c. 7	Public Works Loans Act 1937	The Public Works Loans Act, 1937.	In part, namely,— Sections one; two and schedule.
1 & 2 Geo. 6. c. 9	Consolidated Fund (No. 1) Act 1938	The Consolidated Fund (No. 1) Act, 1938.	The whole act.
1 & 2 Geo. 6. c. 11	Blind Persons Act 1938	The Blind Persons Act, 1938.	In part, namely,— Section six subsection two.
1 & 2 Geo. 6. c. 15	Cotton Industry Act 1938	The Cotton Industry Act, 1938.	The whole act.
1 & 2 Geo. 6. c. 17	Cinematograph Films Act 1938	The Cinematograph Films Act, 1938.	In part, namely,— Section forty-six subsection two.
1 & 2 Geo. 6. c. 20	Army and Air Force (Annual) Act 1938	The Army and Air Force (Annual) Act, 1938.	In part, namely,— Preamble; sections two and three. Section six. Schedule.
1 & 2 Geo. 6. c. 22	Trade Marks Act 1938	The Trade Marks Act, 1938.	In part, namely,— Section seventy subsection one. Section seventy-one subsection two. Schedule four.
1 & 2 Geo. 6. c. 24	Conveyancing Amendment (Scotland) Act 1938	The Conveyancing Amendment (Scotland) Act, 1938.	In part, namely,— Section two subsection three. Section three. Section twelve subsection three.
1 & 2 Geo. 6. c. 28	Evidence Act 1938	The Evidence Act, 1938.	In part, namely,— Section seven subsection three.
1 & 2 Geo. 6. c. 29	Patents etc. (International Conventions) Act 1938	The Patents etc. (International Conventions) Act, 1938.	In part, namely,— Section seven. Section twelve subsection seven.
1 & 2 Geo. 6. c. 30	Sea Fish Industry Act 1938	The Sea Fish Industry Act, 1938.	In part, namely,— Section forty.
1 & 2 Geo. 6. c. 35	Housing (Rural Workers) Amendment Act 1938	The Housing (Rural Workers) Amendment Act, 1938.	In part, namely,— Section one.
1 & 2 Geo. 6. c. 36	Infanticide Act 1938	The Infanticide Act, 1938.	In part, namely,— Section two subsection three.
1 & 2 Geo. 6. c. 40	Children and Young Persons Act 1938	The Children and Young Persons Act, 1938.	In part, namely,— Section eight the words " and in the Education Act, 1921." Section nine subsection three. The Schedule so far as relates to the Education Act, 1921.
1 & 2 Geo. 6. c. 42	Herring Industry Act 1938	The Herring Industry Act, 1938.	In part, namely,— Section nine the proviso and section ten subsection two. Section ten subsection four and schedule three.
1 & 2 Geo. 6. c. 44	Road Haulage Wages Act 1938	The Road Haulage Wages Act, 1938.	In part, namely,— Section seventeen subsection three. Section seventeen subsection four.
1 & 2 Geo. 6. c. 45	Inheritance (Family Provision) Act 1938	The Inheritance (Family Provision) Act, 1938.	In part, namely,— Section six subsection two.
1 & 2 Geo. 6. c. 46	Finance Act 1938	The Finance Act, 1938.	In part, namely,— Section one subsection three. Section two subsection four. Sections three subsection four and five subsection two. Sections eight; fourteen and fifteen. Section forty-three subsection three. Sections fifty-four; fifty-five subsection seven and schedules two and five.
1 & 2 Geo. 6. c. 47	Appropriation Act 1938	The Appropriation Act, 1938.	The whole act.
1 & 2 Geo. 6. c. 48	Criminal Procedure (Scotland) Act 1938	The Criminal Procedure (Scotland) Act, 1938.	In part, namely,— Section eleven subsection two.
1 & 2 Geo. 6. c. 50	Divorce (Scotland) Act 1938	The Divorce (Scotland) Act, 1938.	In part, namely,— Section seven.
1 & 2 Geo. 6. c. 53	Hire Purchase Act 1938	The Hire Purchase Act, 1938.	In part, namely,— Section twenty-two subsection two.
1 & 2 Geo. 6. c. 54	Architects Registration Act 1938	The Architects Registration Act, 1938.	In part, namely,— Section one subsection four. Section one subsection five.
1 & 2 Geo. 6. c. 55	Registration of Still-Births (Scotland) Act 1938	The Registration of Still-Births (Scotland) Act, 1938.	In part, namely,— Section five subsection three.
1 & 2 Geo. 6. c. 56	Food and Drugs Act 1938	The Food and Drugs Act, 1938.	In part, namely,— Sections ninety-eight; one hundred and one subsection one and schedule four.
1 & 2 Geo. 6. c. 58	Chimney Sweepers Acts (Repeal) Act 1938	The Chimney Sweepers Acts (Repeal) Act, 1938.	The whole act.
1 & 2 Geo. 6. c. 59	Local Government (Hours of Poll) Act 1938	The Local Government (Hours of Poll) Act, 1938.	In part, namely,— Section two subsection two.
1 & 2 Geo. 6. c. 61	Milk (Extension and Amendment) Act 1938	The Milk (Extension and Amendment) Act, 1938.	The whole act.
1 & 2 Geo. 6. c. 63	Administration of Justice (Miscellaneous Provisions) Act 1938	The Administration of Justice (Miscellaneous Provisions) Act, 1938.	In part, namely,— Sections ten subsection two; nineteen subsection two and twenty subsection three. Section twenty subsection five. Schedules three and four.
1 & 2 Geo. 6. c. 68	Isle of Man (Customs) Act 1938	The Isle of Man (Customs) Act, 1938.	In part, namely,— Section one. Sections two subsection three; three subsection three and five subsection three. Section six subsection one. Sections seven subsection one; twelve subsection two and schedule two.
1 & 2 Geo. 6. c. 69	Young Persons (Employment) Act 1938	The Young Persons (Employment) Act, 1938.	In part, namely,— Section fourteen subsection three.
1 & 2 Geo. 6. c. 71	Bacon Industry Act 1938	The Bacon Industry Act, 1938.	In part, namely,— Section fifty-six subsection two.
1 & 2 Geo. 6. c. 73	Nursing Home Registration (Scotland) Act 1938	The Nursing Home Registration (Scotland) Act, 1938.	In part, namely,— Section eleven subsection two to " Provided that ". Section eleven subsection three. Schedule.
2 & 3 Geo. 6. c. 1	Expiring Laws Continuance Act 1938	The Expiring Laws Continuance Act, 1938.	The whole act.
2 & 3 Geo. 6. c. 2	Public Works Loans Act 1938	The Public Works Loans Act, 1938.	The whole act.
2 & 3 Geo. 6. c. 3	Housing (Financial Provisions) (Scotland) Act 1938	The Housing (Financial Provisions) (Scotland) Act, 1938.	In part, namely,— Section four subsection four. Section seven.
2 & 3 Geo. 6. c. 7	Currency and Bank Notes Act 1939	The Currency and Bank Notes Act, 1939.	In part, namely,— Section five subsection two. Section five subsection three and schedule.
2 & 3 Geo. 6. c. 9	Mining Industry (Welfare Fund) Act 1939	The Mining Industry (Welfare Fund) Act, 1939.	In part, namely,— Section two subsection six and schedule two.
2 & 3 Geo. 6. c. 12	Consolidated Fund (No. 1) Act 1939	The Consolidated Fund (No. 1) Act, 1939.	The whole act.
2 & 3 Geo. 6. c. 16	Prevention of Fraud (Investments) Act 1939	The Prevention of Fraud (Investments) Act, 1939.	In part, namely,— Section twenty-five.
2 & 3 Geo. 6. c. 17	Army and Air Force (Annual) Act 1939	The Army and Air Force (Annual) Act, 1939.	In part, namely,— Preamble; sections two; three; eight subsection two and schedule.
2 & 3 Geo. 6. c. 19	Wild Birds (Duck and Geese) Protection Act 1939	The Wild Birds (Duck and Geese) Protection Act, 1939.	In part, namely,— Section five subsection two.
2 & 3 Geo. 6. c. 20	Reorganisation of Offices (Scotland) Act 1939	The Reorganisation of Offices (Scotland) Act, 1939.	In part, namely,— Section five. Section six subsection one from " the expression ' appointed day ' " to the end of the subsection. Schedule.
2 & 3 Geo. 6. c. 21	Limitation Act 1939	The Limitation Act, 1939.	In part, namely,— Section thirty-four subsection two. Section thirty-four subsection four and schedule.
2 & 3 Geo. 6. c. 24	Reserve and Auxiliary Forces Act 1939	The Reserve and Auxiliary Forces Act, 1939.	The whole act.
2 & 3 Geo. 6. c. 25	Military Training Act 1939	The Military Training Act, 1939.	The whole act.
2 & 3 Geo. 6. c. 27	Adoption of Children (Regulation) Act 1939	The Adoption of Children (Regulation) Act, 1939.	In part, namely,— Section eight subsection two. Section fifteen paragraph (d) so far as it substitutes a new subsection for subsection (5) of s. 2 of 20 & 21 Geo. 5. c. 37. Section seventeen subsection two.
2 & 3 Geo. 6. c. 30	Access to Mountains Act 1939	The Access to Mountains Act, 1939.	In part, namely,— Section twelve subsection one from " and shall " to the end of the subsection.
2 & 3 Geo. 6. c. 31	Civil Defence Act 1939	The Civil Defence Act, 1939.	In part, namely,— Section fifty-six subsection seven.
2 & 3 Geo. 6. c. 32	Patents and Designs (Limits of Time) Act 1939	The Patents and Designs (Limits of Time) Act, 1939.	In part, namely,— Section five subsection five.
2 & 3 Geo. 6. c. 34	Marriage (Scotland) Act 1939	The Marriage (Scotland) Act, 1939.	In part, namely,— Section eight to " Provided that ". Section nine from " shall come " to " forty, and ". Schedule two.
2 & 3 Geo. 6. c. 36	Hall-marking of Foreign Plate Act 1939	The Hall-marking of Foreign Plate Act, 1939.	In part, namely,— Section two subsection two.
2 & 3 Geo. 6. c. 39	Coast Protection Act 1939	The Coast Protection Act, 1939.	In part, namely,— Section five subsection two and schedule two.
2 & 3 Geo. 6. c. 40	London Government Act 1939	The London Government Act, 1939.	In part, namely,— Sections two hundred and five; two hundred and seven to " Provided that ". Section two hundred and eight from " and shall " to the end of the section. Schedules seven and eight.
2 & 3 Geo. 6. c. 41	Finance Act 1939	The Finance Act, 1939.	In part, namely,— Section one subsections one and two. Section one subsection four. Section two subsection one. Section two subsections three and seven subsection four. Sections eleven and twelve. Section thirty-three. Schedule one, Parts I and II. Schedule two, Parts I, II and III.
2 & 3 Geo. 6. c. 44	House to House Collections Act 1939	The House to House Collections Act, 1939.	In part, namely,— Section twelve subsection two.
2 & 3 Geo. 6. c. 46	Milk Industry Act 1939	The Milk Industry Act, 1939.	In part, namely,— Sections one; two; three; four; five and schedule.
2 & 3 Geo. 6. c. 47	Overseas Trade Guarantees Act 1939	The Overseas Trade Guarantees Act, 1939.	In part, namely,— Section eight.
2 & 3 Geo. 6. c. 48	Agricultural Development Act 1939	The Agricultural Development Act, 1939.	In part, namely,— Section nine. Section ten subsection two. Section twenty.
2 & 3 Geo. 6. c. 52	Appropriation Act 1939	The Appropriation Act, 1939.	The whole act.
2 & 3 Geo. 6. c. 53	Isle of Man (Customs) Act 1939	The Isle of Man (Customs) Act, 1939.	In part, namely,— Section two. Sections three subsection five; four subsection three and five subsection two. Section six subsection two and schedule four.
2 & 3 Geo. 6. c. 55	Building Societies Act 1939	The Building Societies Act, 1939.	In part, namely,— Section eighteen subsection three.
2 & 3 Geo. 6. c. 56	Riding Establishments Act 1939	The Riding Establishments Act, 1939.	In part, namely,— Section four subsection two.
2 & 3 Geo. 6. c. 57	War Risks Insurance Act 1939	The War Risks Insurance Act, 1939.	In part, namely,— Section one subsection four.
2 & 3 Geo. 6. c. 59	Air Ministry (Heston and Kenley Aerodromes Extension) Act 1939	The Air Ministry (Heston and Kenley Aerodromes Extension) Act, 1939.	In part, namely,— Section one subsection two. Section seven subsection two.
2 & 3 Geo. 6. c. 63	Appropriation (No. 2) Act 1939	The Appropriation (No. 2) Act, 1939.	The whole act.
2 & 3 Geo. 6. c. 64	Currency (Defence) Act 1939	The Currency (Defence) Act, 1939.	In part, namely,— Section two subsection one. Section three. Section four subsection two.
2 & 3 Geo. 6. c. 71	Rent and Mortgage Interest Restrictions Act 1939	The Rent and Mortgage Interest Restrictions Act, 1939.	In part, namely,— Sections two; five; nine subsection three. Section nine subsection four. Schedule two.
2 & 3 Geo. 6. c. 75	Compensation (Defence) Act 1939	The Compensation (Defence) Act, 1939.	In part, namely,— Section twenty subsection two.
2 & 3 Geo. 6. c. 76	Regional Commissioners Act 1939	The Regional Commissioners Act, 1939.	The whole act.
2 & 3 Geo. 6. c. 78	Administration of Justice (Emergency Provisions) Act 1939	The Administration of Justice (Emergency Provisions) Act, 1939.	The whole act but without prejudice to the temporary and transitional provisions made by the Administration of Justice (Emergency Provisions) Act (Expiry) Order, 1947.
2 & 3 Geo. 6. c. 79	Administration of Justice (Emergency Provisions) (Scotland) Act 1939	The Administration of Justice (Emergency Provisions) (Scotland) Act, 1939.	The whole act but without prejudice to the temporary and transitional provisions made by the Administration of Justice (Emergency Provisions) (Scotland) Act (Expiry) Order, 1947.
2 & 3 Geo. 6. c. 82	Personal Injuries (Emergency Provisions) Act 1939	The Personal Injuries (Emergency Provisions) Act, 1939.	In part, namely,— Section nine subsection three.
2 & 3 Geo. 6. c. 89	Trading with the Enemy Act 1939	The Trading with the Enemy Act, 1939.	In part, namely,— Section seventeen subsection three to " Provided that ", and schedule.
2 & 3 Geo. 6. c. 94	Local Government Staffs (War Service) Act 1939	The Local Government Staffs (War Service) Act, 1939.	In part, namely,— Section seventeen subsection two.
2 & 3 Geo. 6. c. 95	Teachers Superannuation (War Service) Act 1939	The Teachers Superannuation (War Service) Act, 1939.	In part, namely,— Section thirteen subsection three.
2 & 3 Geo. 6. c. 96	Education (Scotland) (War Service Superannuation) Act 1939	The Education (Scotland) (War Service Superannuation) Act, 1939.	In part, namely,— Section eight subsection two.
2 & 3 Geo. 6. c. 99	Income Tax Procedure (Emergency Provisions) Act 1939	The Income Tax Procedure (Emergency Provisions) Act, 1939.	The whole act.
2 & 3 Geo. 6. c. 102	Liability for War Damage (Miscellaneous Provisions) Act 1939	The Liability for War Damage (Miscellaneous Provisions) Act, 1939.	In part, namely,— Section eight subsection four.
2 & 3 Geo. 6. c. 103	Police and Firemen (War Service) Act 1939	The Police and Firemen (War Service) Act, 1939.	In part, namely,— Section sixteen subsection two.
2 & 3 Geo. 6. c. 104	Control of Employment Act 1939	Control of Employment Act, 1939.	The whole act.
2 & 3 Geo. 6. c. 105	Administration of Justice (Emergency Provisions) (Northern Ireland) Act 1939	The Administration of Justice (Emergency Provisions) (Northern Ireland) Act, 1939.	The whole act but without prejudice to the temporary and transitional provisions made by the Administration of Justice (Emergency Provisions) (Northern Ireland) Act (End of Emergency) Order, 1947.
2 & 3 Geo. 6. c. 106	Universities and Colleges (Emergency Provisions) Act 1939	The Universities and Colleges (Emergency Provisions) Act, 1939.	The whole act.
2 & 3 Geo. 6. c. 107	Patents, Designs, Copyright and Trade Marks (Emergency) Act 1939	The Patents, Designs, Copyright and Trade Marks (Emergency) Act, 1939.	In part, namely,— Section eleven subsection two.
2 & 3 Geo. 6. c. 109	Finance (No. 2) Act 1939	The Finance (No. 2) Act, 1939.	In part, namely,— Section one subsection seven. Section two. Sections three subsection four; five subsection four and six subsection three. Section eight. Section nine subsection six. Schedule two.
2 & 3 Geo. 6. c. 113	Courts (Emergency Powers) (Scotland) Act 1939	The Courts (Emergency Powers) (Scotland) Act, 1939.	In part, namely,— Section one subsection one the proviso paragraph (b) and subsection two the first proviso.
2 & 3 Geo. 6. c. 117	National Loans Act 1939	The National Loans Act, 1939.	In part, namely,— Section five subsection four and schedule three.
3 & 4 Geo. 6. c. 1	Expiring Laws Continuance Act 1939	The Expiring Laws Continuance Act, 1939.	The whole act.
3 & 4 Geo. 6. c. 2	Postponement of Enactments (Miscellaneous Provisions) Act 1939	The Postponement of Enactments (Miscellaneous Provisions) Act, 1939.	In part, namely,— Section one and schedule.
3 & 4 Geo. 6. c. 9	Cotton Industry Act 1940	The Cotton Industry Act, 1940.	The whole act.
3 & 4 Geo. 6. c. 11	Consolidated Fund (No. 1) Act 1940	The Consolidated Fund (No. 1) Act, 1940.	The whole act.
3 & 4 Geo. 6. c. 14	Agriculture (Miscellaneous War Provisions) Act 1940	The Agriculture (Miscellaneous War Provisions) Act, 1940.	In part, namely,— Section thirteen subsection four and schedule four.
3 & 4 Geo. 6. c. 18	Army and Air Force (Annual) Act 1940	The Army and Air Force (Annual) Act, 1940.	In part, namely,— Preamble and section two.
3 & 4 Geo. 6. c. 19	Societies (Miscellaneous Provisions) Act 1940	The Societies (Miscellaneous Provisions) Act, 1940.	In part, namely,— Section twelve subsection three and schedule.
3 & 4 Geo. 6. c. 20	Emergency Powers (Defence) Act 1940	The Emergency Powers (Defence) Act, 1940.	In part, namely,— Section one subsection three.
3 & 4 Geo. 6. c. 25	Post Office and Telegraph Act 1940	The Post Office and Telegraph Act, 1940.	In part, namely,— Section one.
3 & 4 Geo. 6. c. 28	Evidence and Powers of Attorney Act 1940	The Evidence and Powers of Attorney Act, 1940.	In part, namely,— Section four subsection two.
3 & 4 Geo. 6. c. 29	Finance Act 1940	The Finance Act, 1940.	In part, namely,— Sections one subsection five; three subsection four; four subsection four and five subsection three. Section six. Section eight subsection seven. Sections eleven and twelve. Section forty-two. Section sixty-two. Section sixty-five subsection eight and schedule eight.
3 & 4 Geo. 6. c. 30	Marriage (Scotland) (Emergency Provisions) Act 1940	The Marriage (Scotland) (Emergency Provisions) Act, 1940.	The whole act.
3 & 4 Geo. 6. c. 39	Consolidated Fund (No. 2) Act 1940	The Consolidated Fund (No. 2) Act, 1940.	The whole act.
3 & 4 Geo. 6. c. 42	Law Reform (Miscellaneous Provisions) (Scotland) Act 1940	The Law Reform (Miscellaneous Provisions) (Scotland) Act, 1940.	In part, namely,— Section eleven subsection three and schedule.
3 & 4 Geo. 6. c. 46	Appropriation Act 1940	The Appropriation Act, 1940.	The whole act.
3 & 4 Geo. 6. c. 48	Finance (No. 2) Act 1940	The Finance (No. 2) Act, 1940.	In part, namely,— Sections one subsection four; three subsection three and four subsection four. Section six subsection one. Section forty-two subsection eight and schedule ten.
3 & 4 Geo. 6. c. 49	Isle of Man (Customs) Act 1940	The Isle of Man (Customs) Act, 1940.	In part, namely,— Section eight. Section nine subsection three and schedule six.
3 & 4 Geo. 6. c. 50	Agriculture (Miscellaneous War Provisions) (No. 2) Act 1940	The Agriculture (Miscellaneous War Provisions) (No. 2) Act, 1940.	In part, namely,— Section four subsection two.
3 & 4 Geo. 6. c. 52	Consolidated Fund (No. 3) Act 1940	The Consolidated Fund (No. 3) Act, 1940.	The whole act.
3 & 4 Geo. 6. c. 53	Prolongation of Parliament Act 1940	The Prolongation of Parliament Act, 1940.	The whole act.
3 & 4 Geo. 6. c. 54	Appropriation (No. 2) Act 1940	The Appropriation (No. 2) Act, 1940.	The whole act.
4 & 5 Geo. 6. c. 2	Expiring Laws Continuance Act 1940	The Expiring Laws Continuance Act, 1940.	The whole act.
4 & 5 Geo. 6. c. 6	Consolidated Fund (No. 1) Act 1941	The Consolidated Fund (No. 1) Act, 1941.	The whole act.
4 & 5 Geo. 6. c. 9	Consolidated Fund (No. 2) Act 1941	The Consolidated Fund (No. 2) Act, 1941.	The whole act.
4 & 5 Geo. 6. c. 10	Air Raid Precautions (Postponement of Financial Investigation) Act 1941	The Air Raid Precautions (Postponement of Financial Investigation) Act, 1941.	The whole act.
4 & 5 Geo. 6. c. 12	War Damage Act 1941	The War Damage Act, 1941.	In part, namely,— Section seventy-four subsection two.
4 & 5 Geo. 6. c. 14	Public Works Loans Act 1941	The Public Works Loans Act, 1941.	In part, namely,— Sections one and two. Sections three, four and the schedule.
4 & 5 Geo. 6. c. 17	Army and Air Force (Annual) Act 1941	The Army and Air Force (Annual) Act, 1941.	In part, namely,— Preamble and section two. Section eight.
4 & 5 Geo. 6. c. 20	Public and Other Schools (War Conditions) Act 1941	The Public and Other Schools (War Conditions) Act, 1941.	The whole act.
4 & 5 Geo. 6. c. 21	Allied Powers (Maritime Courts) Act 1941	The Allied Powers (Maritime Courts) Act, 1941.	The whole act.
4 & 5 Geo. 6. c. 22	Fire Services (Emergency Provisions) Act 1941	The Fire Services (Emergency Provisions) Act, 1941.	The whole act.
4 & 5 Geo. 6. c. 26	Consolidated Fund (No. 3) Act 1941	The Consolidated Fund (No. 3) Act, 1941.	The whole act.
4 & 5 Geo. 6. c. 30	Finance Act 1941	The Finance Act, 1941.	In part, namely,— Sections one; four and five. Sections thirteen subsection three and thirty-three subsection four. Section fifty. Sections fifty-one; fifty-two subsection seven and schedule five.
4 & 5 Geo. 6. c. 31	Goods and Services (Price Control) Act 1941	The Goods and Services (Price Control) Act, 1941.	In part, namely,— Section twenty-three subsection two to " Provided that " and schedule three.
4 & 5 Geo. 6. c. 32	Isle of Man (Customs) Act 1941	The Isle of Man (Customs) Act, 1941.	The whole act.
4 & 5 Geo. 6. c. 34	Repair of War Damage Act 1941	The Repair of War Damage Act, 1941.	In part, namely,— Section one subsection three to " hereby repealed, and ". Sections three and six the words from " and the Essential " to " War Damage) Act, 1939." Sections four and seven subsection two. Section eight subsection two. Schedule paragraphs four and five.
4 & 5 Geo. 6. c. 36	Financial Powers (U.S.A. Securities) Act 1941	The Financial Powers (U.S.A. Securities) Act, 1941.	In part, namely,— Section three subsection two the proviso.
4 & 5 Geo. 6. c. 38	Appropriation Act 1941	The Appropriation Act, 1941.	The whole act.
4 & 5 Geo. 6. c. 42	Pharmacy and Medicines Act 1941	The Pharmacy and Medicines Act, 1941.	In part, namely,— Sections seven; eleven subsection four and twelve subsection six.
4 & 5 Geo. 6. c. 43	Appropriation (No. 2) Act 1941	The Appropriation (No. 2) Act, 1941.	The whole act.
4 & 5 Geo. 6. c. 46	Solicitors Act 1941	The Solicitors Act, 1941.	In part, namely,— Section twenty-six subsections six and seven. Section thirty subsection two.
4 & 5 Geo. 6. c. 48	Prolongation of Parliament Act 1941	The Prolongation of Parliament Act, 1941.	The whole act.
4 & 5 Geo. 6. c. 50	Agriculture (Miscellaneous Provisions) Act 1941	The Agriculture (Miscellaneous Provisions) Act, 1941.	In part, namely,— Section one subsection three.
5 & 6 Geo. 6. c. 2	Consolidated Fund (No. 1) Act 1941 (Session 2)	The Consolidated Fund (No. 1) Act, 1941 (Session 2).	The whole act.
5 & 6 Geo. 6. c. 3	Expiring Laws Continuance Act 1941	The Expiring Laws Continuance Act, 1941.	The whole act.
5 & 6 Geo. 6. c. 6	Patents and Designs Act 1942	The Patents and Designs Act, 1942.	In part, namely,— Section two subsection three. Section two subsection four.
5 & 6 Geo. 6. c. 8	War Orphans Act 1942	The War Orphans Act, 1942.	In part, namely,— Section two subsection two.
5 & 6 Geo. 6. c. 12	Consolidated Fund (No. 2) Act 1942	The Consolidated Fund (No. 2) Act, 1942.	The whole act.
5 & 6 Geo. 6. c. 15	Army and Air Force (Annual) Act 1942	The Army and Air Force (Annual) Act, 1942.	In part, namely,— Preamble and section two.
5 & 6 Geo. 6. c. 21	Finance Act 1942	The Finance Act, 1942.	In part, namely,— Sections one subsection three and five subsection four. Section seven. Section sixteen. Sections twenty-one; twenty-two; twenty-seven and forty-six. Section forty-nine subsection eight. In Schedule nine the words from " For subsection (4) of section nineteen " to the end of the schedule. Schedules eleven, Part III and twelve.
5 & 6 Geo. 6. c. 22	Consolidated Fund (No. 3) Act 1942	The Consolidated Fund (No. 3) Act, 1942.	The whole act.
5 & 6 Geo. 6. c. 27	Appropriation Act 1942	The Appropriation Act, 1942.	The whole act.
5 & 6 Geo. 6. c. 32	Housing (Rural Workers) Act 1942	The Housing (Rural Workers) Act, 1942.	In part, namely,— Section one subsection one.
5 & 6 Geo. 6. c. 33	Appropriation (No. 2) Act 1942	The Appropriation (No. 2) Act, 1942.	The whole act.
5 & 6 Geo. 6. c. 34	Appropriation (No. 3) Act 1942	The Appropriation (No. 3) Act, 1942.	The whole act.
5 & 6 Geo. 6. c. 37	Prolongation of Parliament Act 1942	The Prolongation of Parliament Act, 1942.	The whole act.
6 & 7 Geo. 6. c. 1	Expiring Laws Continuance Act 1942	The Expiring Laws Continuance Act, 1942.	The whole act.
6 & 7 Geo. 6. c. 2	Supreme Court (Northern Ireland) Act 1942	The Supreme Court (Northern Ireland) Act, 1942.	In part, namely,— Section three subsection three and schedule.
6 & 7 Geo. 6. c. 4	Consolidated Fund (No. 1) Act 1943	The Consolidated Fund (No. 1) Act, 1943.	The whole act.
6 & 7 Geo. 6. c. 11	Consolidated Fund (No. 2) Act 1943	The Consolidated Fund (No. 2) Act, 1943.	The whole act.
6 & 7 Geo. 6. c. 15	Army and Air Force (Annual) Act 1943	The Army and Air Force (Annual) Act, 1943.	In part, namely,— Preamble and section two. Section three subsection three.
6 & 7 Geo. 6. c. 16	Agriculture (Miscellaneous Provisions) Act 1943	The Agriculture (Miscellaneous Provisions) Act, 1943.	In part, namely,— Section one subsection two. Section two. Section eighteen subsection two.
6 & 7 Geo. 6. c. 17	Nurses Act 1943	The Nurses Act, 1943.	In part, namely,— Section thirteen subsection four. Section sixteen subsection three.
6 & 7 Geo. 6. c. 19	Courts (Emergency Powers) Act 1943	The Courts (Emergency Powers) Act, 1943.	In part, namely,— Section fourteen subsection two and schedule two.
6 & 7 Geo. 6. c. 20	Consolidated Fund (No. 3) Act 1943	The Consolidated Fund (No. 3) Act, 1943.	The whole act.
6 & 7 Geo. 6. c. 21	War Damage Act 1943	The War Damage Act, 1943.	In part, namely,— Sections one hundred and eight subsection one the last sentence; and one hundred and nineteen subsection four. Section one hundred and twenty-seven subsection one and schedule eight.
6 & 7 Geo. 6. c. 25	Settled Land and Trustees Act 1943	The Settled Land and Trustees Act, 1943.	In part, namely,— Section two.
6 & 7 Geo. 6. c. 26	Telegraph Act 1943	The Telegraph Act, 1943.	In part, namely,— Section two subsection four.
6 & 7 Geo. 6. c. 28	Finance Act 1943	The Finance Act, 1943.	In part, namely,— Sections one subsection three and five subsection six. Sections thirteen; fourteen and thirty. Section thirty-one subsection seven and schedule nine.
6 & 7 Geo. 6. c. 31	Appropriation Act 1943	The Appropriation Act, 1943.	The whole act.
6 & 7 Geo. 6. c. 33	Nurses (Scotland) Act 1943	The Nurses (Scotland) Act, 1943.	In part, namely,— Section sixteen subsection four.
6 & 7 Geo. 6. c. 35	Foreign Service Act 1943	The Foreign Service Act, 1943.	In part, namely,— Section one subsection two.
6 & 7 Geo. 6. c. 41	Appropriation (No. 2) Act 1943	The Appropriation (No. 2) Act, 1943.	The whole act.
6 & 7 Geo. 6. c. 45	Income Tax (Employments) Act 1943	The Income Tax (Employments) Act, 1943.	In part, namely,— Section five subsection three to " Provided that " and schedule three.
6 & 7 Geo. 6. c. 46	Prolongation of Parliament Act 1943	The Prolongation of Parliament Act, 1943.	The whole act.
6 & 7 Geo. 6. c. 48	Parliament (Elections and Meeting) Act 1943	The Parliament (Elections and Meeting) Act, 1943.	In part, namely,— Section thirty-three so far as unrepealed and schedule seven.
7 & 8 Geo. 6. c. 1	Expiring Laws Continuance Act 1943	The Expiring Laws Continuance Act, 1943.	The whole act.
7 & 8 Geo. 6. c. 4	Consolidated Fund (No. 1) Act 1944	The Consolidated Fund (No. 1) Act, 1944.	The whole act.
7 & 8 Geo. 6. c. 9	Supreme Court of Judicature (Amendment) Act 1944	The Supreme Court of Judicature (Amendment) Act, 1944.	In part, namely,— Section two subsection two.
7 & 8 Geo. 6. c. 10	Disabled Persons (Employment) Act 1944	The Disabled Persons (Employment) Act, 1944.	In part, namely,— Section twenty-three subsection three.
7 & 8 Geo. 6. c. 12	Income Tax (Offices and Employments) Act 1944	The Income Tax (Offices and Employments) Act, 1944.	In part, namely,— Section nine subsection four and schedule.
7 & 8 Geo. 6. c. 15	Reinstatement in Civil Employment Act 1944	The Reinstatement in Civil Employment Act, 1944.	In part, namely,— Section twenty-four subsection two. Section twenty-four subsection three so far as unrepealed and schedule three.
7 & 8 Geo. 6. c. 16	Public Works Loans Act 1944	The Public Works Loans Act, 1944.	In part, namely,— Sections one; two and three and schedule.
7 & 8 Geo. 6. c. 17	Consolidated Fund (No. 2) Act 1944	The Consolidated Fund (No. 2) Act, 1944.	The whole act.
7 & 8 Geo. 6. c. 18	Army and Air Force (Annual) Act 1944	The Army and Air Force (Annual) Act, 1944.	In part, namely,— Preamble; sections two and three subsection two.
7 & 8 Geo. 6. c. 20	Consolidated Fund (No. 3) Act 1944	The Consolidated Fund (No. 3) Act, 1944.	The whole act.
7 & 8 Geo. 6. c. 23	Finance Act 1944	The Finance Act, 1944.	In part, namely,— Section one subsections one and three. Section two subsection one. Sections six and seven. Section forty-eight. Section forty-nine subsection nine and schedule five.
7 & 8 Geo. 6. c. 26	Rural Water Supplies and Sewerage Act 1944	The Rural Water Supplies and Sewerage Act, 1944.	In part, namely,— Section eight subsection three to " Provided that " and the schedule.
7 & 8 Geo. 6. c. 27	Isle of Man (Customs) Act 1944	The Isle of Man (Customs) Act, 1944.	The whole act.
7 & 8 Geo. 6. c. 30	Appropriation Act 1944	The Appropriation Act, 1944.	The whole act.
7 & 8 Geo. 6. c. 31	Education Act 1944	The Education Act, 1944.	In part, namely,— Section forty-three subsection one to " Part of this Act,". Section fifty-three subsection four.
7 & 8 Geo. 6. c. 36	Housing (Temporary Accommodation) Act 1944	The Housing (Temporary Accommodation) Act, 1944.	In part, namely,— Section six subsections one, two and three.
7 & 8 Geo. 6. c. 37	Appropriation (No. 2) Act 1944	The Appropriation (No. 2) Act, 1944.	The whole act.
7 & 8 Geo. 6. c. 39	Housing (Scotland) Act 1944	The Housing (Scotland) Act, 1944.	In part, namely,— Sections one and two.
7 & 8 Geo. 6. c. 40	Liabilities (War Time Adjustment) Act 1944	The Liabilities (War Time Adjustment) Act, 1944.	In part, namely,— Sections ten and eleven subsection two.
7 & 8 Geo. 6. c. 45	Prolongation of Parliament Act 1944	The Prolongation of Parliament Act, 1944.	The whole act.
8 & 9 Geo. 6. c. 1	Consolidated Fund (No. 1) Act 1944 (Session 2)	The Consolidated Fund (No. 1) Act, 1944 (Session 2).	The whole act.
8 & 9 Geo. 6. c. 2	Expiring Laws Continuance Act 1944	The Expiring Laws Continuance Act, 1944.	The whole act.
8 & 9 Geo. 6. c. 4	Consolidated Fund (No. 2) Act 1945	The Consolidated Fund (No. 2) Act, 1945.	The whole act.
8 & 9 Geo. 6. c. 5	Representation of the People Act 1945	The Representation of the People Act, 1945.	In part, namely,— Section forty subsection two and schedule five.
8 & 9 Geo. 6. c. 8	Road Transport Lighting (Cycles) Act 1945	The Road Transport Lighting (Cycles) Act, 1945.	In part, namely,— Section one.
8 & 9 Geo. 6. c. 9	Export Guarantees Act 1945	The Export Guarantees Act, 1945.	In part, namely,— Section four from " and the provisions " to the end of the section. Schedule, Part II.
8 & 9 Geo. 6. c. 13	Consolidated Fund (No. 3) Act 1945	The Consolidated Fund (No. 3) Act, 1945.	The whole act.
8 & 9 Geo. 6. c. 14	Teachers Superannuation Act 1945	The Teachers Superannuation Act, 1945.	In part, namely,— Section fourteen subsection three.
8 & 9 Geo. 6. c. 16	Limitation (Enemies and War Prisoners) Act 1945	The Limitation (Enemies and War Prisoners) Act, 1945.	In part, namely,— Section six subsection two.
8 & 9 Geo. 6. c. 17	Wages Council Act 1945	The Wages Council Act, 1945.	In part, namely,— Section twenty-five subsection three and schedule four.
8 & 9 Geo. 6. c. 18	Local Authorities Loans Act 1945	The Local Authorities Loans Act, 1945.	In part, namely,— Section twelve subsection two.
8 & 9 Geo. 6. c. 19	Ministry of Fuel and Power Act 1945	The Ministry of Fuel and Power Act, 1945.	In part, namely,— Section seven subsection one from " and the enactments " to the end of the subsection. Schedule three.
8 & 9 Geo. 6. c. 22	Army and Air Force (Annual) Act 1945	The Army and Air Force (Annual) Act, 1945.	In part, namely,— Preamble and section two.
8 & 9 Geo. 6. c. 24	Finance Act 1945	The Finance Act, 1945.	In part, namely,— Section two subsection two.
8 & 9 Geo. 6. c. 25	Appropriation Act 1945	The Appropriation Act, 1945.	The whole act.
8 & 9 Geo. 6. c. 27	Welsh Church (Burial Grounds) Act 1945	The Welsh Church (Burial Grounds) Act, 1945.	In part, namely,— Section six subsection two.
8 & 9 Geo. 6. c. 35	Forestry Act 1945	The Forestry Act, 1945.	In part, namely,— Sections three subsection three; ten subsection four and schedule two.
8 & 9 Geo. 6. c. 38	Local Government (Boundary Commission) Act 1945	The Local Government (Boundary Commission) Act, 1945.	In part, namely,— Section eight subsection two and schedule two.
8 & 9 Geo. 6. c. 40	Postponement of Polling Day Act 1945	The Postponement of Polling Day Act, 1945.	The whole act.
8 & 9 Geo. 6. c. 41	Family Allowances Act 1945	The Family Allowances Act, 1945.	In part, namely,— Section twenty-eight subsection one.
8 & 9 Geo. 6. c. 42	Water Act 1945	The Water Act, 1945.	In part, namely,— Section sixty-two to " Provided that ". Section sixty-three subsection three. Schedule five.
8 & 9 Geo. 6. c. 43	Requisitioned Land and War Works Act 1945	The Requisitioned Land and War Works Act, 1945.	In part, namely,— Section forty-four.
9 & 10 Geo. 6. c. 1	Local Elections (Service Abroad) Act 1945	The Local Elections (Service Abroad) Act, 1945.	The whole act.
9 & 10 Geo. 6. c. 4	Consolidated Fund (No. 1) Act 1945	The Consolidated Fund (No. 1) Act, 1945.	The whole act.
9 & 10 Geo. 6. c. 9	Expiring Laws Continuance Act 1945	The Expiring Laws Continuance Act, 1945.	The whole act.
9 & 10 Geo. 6. c. 10	Supplies and Services (Transitional Powers) Act 1945	The Supplies and Services (Transitional Powers) Act, 1945.	In part, namely,— Section four subsection three.
9 & 10 Geo. 6. c. 13	Finance (No. 2) Act 1945	The Finance (No. 2) Act, 1945.	In part, namely,— Section twenty-one subsection six. Section sixty-one. Section sixty-two subsection eight and schedules three Part III and ten.
9 & 10 Geo. 6. c. 14	Isle of Man (Customs) Act 1945	The Isle of Man (Customs) Act, 1945.	The whole act.
9 & 10 Geo. 6. c. 18	Statutory Orders (Special Procedure) Act 1945	The Statutory Orders (Special Procedure) Act, 1945.	In part, namely,— Section twelve subsection two.
9 & 10 Geo. 6. c. 26	Emergency Laws (Transitional Provisions) Act 1946	The Emergency Laws (Transitional Provisions) Act, 1946.	In part, namely,— Section seventeen.
9 & 10 Geo. 6. c. 27	Bank of England Act 1946	The Bank of England Act, 1946.	In part, namely,— Section three subsection four. Section four subsection eight. Schedule three.
9 & 10 Geo. 6. c. 28	Assurance Companies Act 1946	The Assurance Companies Act, 1946.	In part, namely,— Section thirteen subsection two and schedule four.
9 & 10 Geo. 6. c. 33	Consolidated Fund (No. 1) Act 1946	The Consolidated Fund (No. 1) Act, 1946.	The whole act.
9 & 10 Geo. 6. c. 40	Miscellaneous Financial Provisions Act 1946	The Miscellaneous Financial Provisions Act, 1946.	In part, namely,— Section six subsection three and schedule.
9 & 10 Geo. 6. c. 41	Public Works Loans Act 1946	The Public Works Loans Act, 1946.	In part, namely,— Section two. Sections three and four. Section five subsection two and schedule two.
9 & 10 Geo. 6. c. 42	Water (Scotland) Act 1946	The Water (Scotland) Act, 1946.	In part, namely,— Section eighty-seven. Section eighty-nine subsection two. Schedule five.
9 & 10 Geo. 6. c. 46	Police Act 1946	The Police Act, 1946.	In part, namely,— Section twenty subsection four and schedule five.
9 & 10 Geo. 6. c. 47	Army and Air Force (Annual) Act 1946	The Army and Air Force (Annual) Act, 1946.	In part, namely,— Preamble and section two.
9 & 10 Geo. 6. c. 48	Housing (Financial and Miscellaneous Provisions) Act 1946	The Housing (Financial and Miscellaneous Provisions) Act, 1946.	In part, namely,— Sections nine subsection three and sixteen subsection seven.
9 & 10 Geo. 6. c. 49	Acquisition of Land (Authorisation Procedure) Act 1946	The Acquisition of Land (Authorisation Procedure) Act, 1946.	In part, namely,— Section ten subsection three and schedule six.
9 & 10 Geo. 6. c. 55	Ministerial Salaries Act 1946	The Ministerial Salaries Act, 1946.	In part, namely,— Section four subsection two.
9 & 10 Geo. 6. c. 59	Coal Industry (Nationalisation) Act 1946	The Coal Industry (Nationalisation) Act, 1946.	In part, namely,— Section sixty-five subsection three and schedule four.
9 & 10 Geo. 6. c. 64	Finance Act 1946	The Finance Act, 1946.	In part, namely,— Section four. Section eight subsection two. Sections forty-eight subsection two and sixty-five. Section sixty-three subsection two; sixty-seven subsections ten and eleven and schedule twelve.
9 & 10 Geo. 6. c. 65	Appropriation Act 1946	The Appropriation Act, 1946.	The whole act.
9 & 10 Geo. 6. c. 69	Isle of Man (Customs) Act 1946	The Isle of Man (Customs) Act, 1946.	In part, namely,— Section one subsection three. Section two.
9 & 10 Geo. 6. c. 70	Civil Aviation Act 1946	The Civil Aviation Act, 1946.	In part, namely,— Section forty-one subsection four.
9 & 10 Geo. 6. c. 71	Police (Scotland) Act 1946	The Police (Scotland) Act, 1946.	In part, namely,— Section thirteen subsection three and schedule four.
9 & 10 Geo. 6. c. 72	Education (Scotland) Act 1946	The Education (Scotland) Act, 1946.	In part, namely,— Section thirty-two subsection two. Section one hundred and forty-four subsection four to " Provided that "; and schedule eight.
9 & 10 Geo. 6. c. 73	Hill Farming Act 1946	The Hill Farming Act, 1946.	In part, namely,— Section twenty-two.
9 & 10 Geo. 6. c. 75	Public Works Loans (No. 2) Act 1946	The Public Works Loans (No. 2) Act, 1946.	In part, namely,— Section one. Section three.
9 & 10 Geo. 6. c. 77	Association of County Councils (Scotland) Act 1946	The Association of County Councils (Scotland) Act, 1946.	In part, namely,— Section five subsections two and three.
9 & 10 Geo. 6. c. 81	National Health Service Act 1946	The National Health Service Act, 1946.	In part, namely,— Section twenty-six subsection five. Section forty-nine subsections six and seven. Schedules nine Part II and ten Part II.
10 & 11 Geo. 6. c. 1	Expiring Laws Continuance Act 1946	The Expiring Laws Continuance Act, 1946.	The whole act.
10 & 11 Geo. 6. c. 3	Unemployment and Family Allowances (Northern Ireland Agreement) Act 1946	The Unemployment and Family Allowances (Northern Ireland Agreement) Act, 1946.	In part, namely,— Section two subsection two.
10 & 11 Geo. 6. c. 5	Greenwich Hospital Act 1947	The Greenwich Hospital Act, 1947.	In part, namely,— Section three subsection two and schedule two.
10 & 11 Geo. 6. c. 12	Births and Deaths Registration Act 1947	The Births and Deaths Registration Act, 1947.	In part, namely,— Section two subsection two.
10 & 11 Geo. 6. c. 14	Exchange Control Act 1947	The Exchange Control Act, 1947.	In part, namely,— Section forty-four subsection three.
10 & 11 Geo. 6. c. 15	Agricultural Wages (Regulation) Act 1947	The Agricultural Wages (Regulation) Act, 1947.	In part, namely,— Section twelve subsection five and schedule three.
10 & 11 Geo. 6. c. 17	Consolidated Fund (No. 1) Act 1947	The Consolidated Fund (No. 1) Act, 1947.	The whole act.
10 & 11 Geo. 6. c. 18	Air Navigation Act 1947	The Air Navigation Act, 1947.	In part, namely,— Section eight subsection three and schedule.
10 & 11 Geo. 6. c. 20	Dog Racecourse Betting (Temporary Provisions) Act 1947	The Dog Racecourse Betting (Temporary Provisions) Act, 1947.	The whole act.
10 & 11 Geo. 6. c. 25	Army and Air Force (Annual) Act 1947	The Army and Air Force (Annual) Act, 1947.	In part, namely,— Preamble and section two.
10 & 11 Geo. 6. c. 27	National Health Service (Scotland) Act 1947	The National Health Service (Scotland) Act, 1947.	In part, namely,— Schedules nine Part II and eleven Part II.
10 & 11 Geo. 6. c. 28	Isle of Man Harbours Act 1947	The Isle of Man Harbours Act, 1947.	In part, namely,— Section one subsection three and the schedule.
10 & 11 Geo. 6. c. 33	Foreign Marriage Act 1947	The Foreign Marriage Act, 1947.	In part, namely,— Section four subsection one.
10 & 11 Geo. 6. c. 35	Finance Act 1947	The Finance Act, 1947.	In part, namely,— Section five subsection seven to " Provided that ". Section thirty-two subsection two. Section sixty-nine. Schedule two Part III.
10 & 11 Geo. 6. c. 39	Statistics of Trade Act 1947	The Statistics of Trade Act, 1947.	In part, namely,— Section nineteen subsection four.
10 & 11 Geo. 6. c. 40	Industrial Organisation and Development Act 1947	The Industrial Organisation and Development Act, 1947.	In part, namely,— Section sixteen.
10 & 11 Geo. 6. c. 41	Fire Services Act 1947	The Fire Services Act, 1947.	In part, namely,— Section thirty-nine subsection four and schedule six.
10 & 11 Geo. 6. c. 42	Acquisition of Land (Authorisation of Procedure) (Scotland) Act 1947	The Acquisition of Land (Authorisation of Procedure) (Scotland) Act, 1947.	In part, namely,— Section eight subsection one and schedule five.
10 & 11 Geo. 6. c. 43	Local Government (Scotland) Act 1947	The Local Government (Scotland) Act, 1947.	In part, namely,— Section three hundred and seventy-eight. Section three hundred and eighty-one to " Provided that ". Schedule thirteen. Schedule fourteen.
10 & 11 Geo. 6. c. 44	Crown Proceedings Act 1947	The Crown Proceedings Act, 1947.	In part, namely,— Section thirty-nine subsection one. Section fifty-four subsection two. Schedule two.
10 & 11 Geo. 6. c. 47	Companies Act 1947	The Companies Act, 1947.	In part, namely,— Section one hundred and twenty-three subsection three so far as unrepealed and Schedule nine Part II.
10 & 11 Geo. 6. c. 50	Isle of Man (Customs) Act 1947	The Isle of Man (Customs) Act, 1947.	In part, namely,— Section five. Section six subsection two.
10 & 11 Geo. 6. c. 51	Town and Country Planning Act 1947	The Town and Country Planning Act, 1947.	In part, namely,— Section one hundred and twenty subsection two.
10 & 11 Geo. 6. c. 52	Appropriation Act 1947	The Appropriation Act, 1947.	The whole act.
10 & 11 Geo. 6. c. 53	Town and Country Planning (Scotland) Act 1947	The Town and Country Planning (Scotland) Act, 1947.	In part, namely,— Section one hundred and fourteen subsection two.
10 & 11 Geo. 6. c. 54	Electricity Act 1947	The Electricity Act, 1947.	In part, namely,— Section fifty-seven subsection seven to " of that Schedule, and ". Schedule five.
11 & 12 Geo. 6. c. 3	Burma Independence Act 1947	The Burma Independence Act, 1947.	In part, namely,— Section five subsection three to " Provided that " and schedule two.
11 & 12 Geo. 6. c. 9	Finance (No. 2) Act 1947	The Finance (No. 2) Act, 1947.	In part, namely,— Section one subsection one. Section nine subsection five and schedule six.
11 & 12 Geo. 6. c. 10	Emergency Laws (Miscellaneous Provisions) Act 1947	The Emergency Laws (Miscellaneous Provisions) Act, 1947.	In part, namely,— Sections four subsection three and ten.
11 & 12 Geo. 6. c. 13	Public Works Loans Act 1947	The Public Works Loans Act, 1947.	In part, namely,— Sections one; three; four and schedule.
11 & 12 Geo. 6. c. 23	Cinematograph Films Act 1948	The Cinematograph Films Act, 1948.	In part, namely,— Section ten subsection five. Schedule one Part II.
11 & 12 Geo. 6. c. 24	Police Pensions Act 1948	The Police Pensions Act, 1948.	In part, namely,— Sections four subsection five; five subsection six; six; nine subsection two and schedule two.
11 & 12 Geo. 6. c. 25	Royal Marines Act 1948	The Royal Marines Act, 1948.	In part, namely,— Section one subsection six.
11 & 12 Geo. 6. c. 26	Local Government Act 1948	The Local Government Act, 1948.	In part, namely,— Sections one hundred and thirteen subsection three and one hundred and thirty-two subsection eight.
11 & 12 Geo. 6. c. 28	Army and Air Force (Annual) Act 1948	The Army and Air Force (Annual) Act, 1948.	In part, namely,— Sections seven; eleven subsection two; thirteen subsection three; fourteen paragraph (a) and schedule Parts I, II and III.
11 & 12 Geo. 6. c. 29	National Assistance Act 1948	The National Assistance Act, 1948.	In part, namely,— Section sixty-two subsection three and schedule seven.
11 & 12 Geo. 6. c. 32	River Boards Act 1948	The River Boards Act, 1948.	In part, namely,— Section thirty-seven subsection four.
11 & 12 Geo. 6. c. 33	Superannuation (Miscellaneous Provisions) Act 1948	The Superannuation (Miscellaneous Provisions) Act, 1948.	In part, namely,— Section twelve subsection four.
11 & 12 Geo. 6. c. 35	Animals Act 1948	The Animals Act, 1948.	In part, namely,— Sections twelve subsection two and thirteen subsection five and schedule.
11 & 12 Geo. 6. c. 40	Education (Miscellaneous Provisions) Act 1948	The Education (Miscellaneous Provisions) Act, 1948.	In part, namely,— Section eleven subsection two and schedule two.
11 & 12 Geo. 6. c. 43	Children Act 1948	The Children Act, 1948.	In part, namely,— Section sixty subsection three. Section sixty-two subsection two. Schedule four.
11 & 12 Geo. 6. c. 46	Employment and Training Act 1948	The Employment and Training Act, 1948.	In part, namely,— Section twenty-one subsection one and schedule two.
11 & 12 Geo. 6. c. 47	Agricultural Wages Act 1948	The Agricultural Wages Act, 1948.	In part, namely,— Section twenty subsection one and schedule five.
11 & 12 Geo. 6. c. 49	Finance Act 1948	The Finance Act, 1948.	In part, namely,— Section fifteen subsection five.
11 & 12 Geo. 6. c. 52	Veterinary Surgeons Act 1948	The Veterinary Surgeons Act, 1948.	In part, namely,— Sections twenty-five subsection five and twenty-seven subsection two.
11 & 12 Geo. 6. c. 55	Factories Act 1948	The Factories Act, 1948.	In part, namely,— Section sixteen subsection two and schedule three.
11 & 12 Geo. 6. c. 56	British Nationality Act 1948	The British Nationality Act, 1948.	In part, namely,— Section thirty-four subsection two.
11 & 12 Geo. 6. c. 57	Public Registers and Records (Scotland) Act 1948	The Public Registers and Records (Scotland) Act, 1948.	In part, namely,— Section one subsection eight. Section seven subsection two and schedule.
11 & 12 Geo. 6. c. 61	Isle of Man (Customs) Act 1948	The Isle of Man (Customs) Act, 1948.	In part, namely,— Section eight subsection three and schedule four.
11 & 12 Geo. 6. c. 62	Statute Law Revision Act 1948	The Statute Law Revision Act, 1948.	In part, namely,— Schedule one.
11 & 12 Geo. 6. c. 65	Representation of the People Act 1948	The Representation of the People Act, 1948.	In part, namely,— Schedule ten Part II paragraph seven sub-paragraph one and in sub-paragraph two the words to " any subsequent year " and the words from " (a) the amendments made " to " shall not apply ".
12 & 13 Geo. 6. c. 5	Civil Defence Act 1948	The Civil Defence Act, 1948.	In part, namely,— Section eleven subsection two and schedule.
12 & 13 Geo. 6. c. 7	Wages Councils Act 1948	The Wages Councils Act, 1948.	In part, namely,— Section eight subsection four and schedule three.
12 & 13 Geo. 6. c. 10	Administration of Justice (Scotland) Act 1948	The Administration of Justice (Scotland) Act, 1948.	In part, namely,— Section five subsection two and schedule.

==== Second schedule: Enactments of the Irish Parliament passed before the commencement of the Union with Ireland Act, 1800 ====
Second schedule — Enactments of the Irish Parliament passed before the commencement of the Union with Ireland Act, 1800
Citation	Short title	Description	Extent of repeal
7 Edw. 4. c. 2 (I)	N/A	An Act that none shall purchase Benefices from Rome.	The whole act.
28 Hen. 8. c. 5 (I)	Act of Supremacy (Ireland) 1537	An Act authorising the King, His Heirs and Successors, to be supreme Head of the Church of Ireland.	The whole act so far as unrepealed.
33 Hen. 8. c. 1 (I)	Crown of Ireland Act 1542	An Act that the King of England, His Heirs and Successors, be Kings of Ireland.	In part, namely,— In section two the words " And be it enacted by authority aforesaid, That on this side the first day of July next coming proclamation shall be made in all Shires within this land of Ireland of the tenour and sentences of this Act " and the words " after the said first day of July ".
33 Hen. 8. c. 10 (I)	Joint Tenants Act 1542	An Act for Jointenants.	The whole act.
33 Hen. 8. Sess. 2. c. 3 (I)	Mishaps and Jeofails Act 1542	An Act touching Mispleading and Jeoyfailes.	The whole act so far as unrepealed.
2 Eliz. 1. c. 2 (I)	Act of Uniformity 1560	An Act for the Uniformitie of Common Prayer and Service in the Church, and the Administration of the Sacraments.	The whole act so far as unrepealed.
12 Eliz. 1. c. 2 (I)	Exemplifications of Records Act 1570	An Act that Exemplifications shall be of the same Effect and Strength, as the Record or Matter exemplified should be.	The whole act.
11, 12 & 13 Jam. 1. c. 8 (I)	Outlawry Act 1613	An Act for the avoyding of privie and secret outlawries of His Majesties' subjects in personall actions.	The whole act so far as unrepealed.
10 Chas. 1. Sess. 2. c. 17 (I)	Nonsuit Costs Act 1634	An Act, that where the plaintiffe is non-suite, the defendant shall recover costs.	The whole act.
10 Chas. 1. Sess. 3. c. 7 (I)	Debts upon Execution Act 1634	An Act for contentation of debts upon execution.	The whole act.
10 Chas. 1. Sess. 3. c. 18 (I)	Sheriffs Act 1634	An Act for the swearing of under-sheriffs, and other officers.	In part, namely,— Sections one and two. In section five the words " sheriffe or other " and " or any of them ".
10 & 11 Chas. 1. c. 8 (I)	Defendant's Costs Act 1634	An Act to give costs to the defendant, upon a non-suite of the plaintiffe, or verdict against him.	The whole act.
10 & 11 Chas. 1. c. 10 (I)	Certiorari and Supersedeas Act 1634	An Act to prevent and punish the abuses in procuring processe and supersedeas of the peace and good behaviour out of his Majesties Courts of Chancery, Kings Bench, and to prevent abuses in procuring writs of certiorari, etc.	In part, namely,— Section two. Section three. Section four.
14 & 15 Chas. 2. c. 21 (I)	Lord Chancellor's Seal Fee Act 1662	An Act for increasing the fee of the seal due to the lord chancellor of Ireland.	The whole act.
17 & 18 Chas. 2. c. 6 (I)	Act of Uniformity 1665	An Act for the Uniformity of Publique Prayers and Administration of Sacraments, and other Rites and Ceremonies; and for establishing the Forme of making, ordaining, and consecrating Bishops, Priests and Deacons, in the Church of Ireland.	The whole act so far as unrepealed.
17 & 18 Chas. 2. c. 11 (I)	Judgments and Recognizances Act 1665	An Act to prevent Delays in extending Statutes, Judgments, and Recognizances.	The whole act, so far as unrepealed.
17 & 18 Chas. 2. c. 20 (I)	Dublin Nisi Prius Trials Act 1665	An Act for the trial by Nisi Prius, of Issues laid in the City of Dublin and County of Dublin.	The whole act.
4 Will. & Mar. c. 4 (I)	Commissioners for Taking Affidavits Act 1692	An Act for taking Affidavits in the Country, to be made use of in the Courts of King's Bench, Common Pleas and Exchequer.	The whole act.
7 Will. 3. c. 2 (I)	Ecclesiastical Jurisdiction Act 1695	An Act for taking away the Writ de heretico comburendo.	The whole act so far as unrepealed.
7 Will. 3. c. 18 (I)	Bail in Civil Actions Act 1695	An Act for taking Special Bails in the Country, upon Actions and Suits depending in the Courts of King's Bench, Common Pleas, and Exchequer at Dublin.	The whole act.
7 Will. 3. c. 22 (I)	Distress for Rent Act 1695	An Act for the more speedy and effectual proceeding upon Distresses and Avowries for Rent.	In part, namely,— Sections one and two.
9 Will. 3. c. 10 (I)	Frivolous Suits Act 1697	An Act for the preventing frivolous and vexatious Law-suits; and giving remedy to the Parties aggrieved to recover their Costs at Law, in certain Cases, where heretofore no Costs were given.	The whole act, so far as unrepealed.
9 Will. 3. c. 13 (I)	Transferring Suits from Inferior Courts Act 1697	An Act for avoiding of vexatious Delays, caused by removing Actions and Sutes out of the inferior Courts.	The whole act.
10 Will. 3. c. 8 (I)	Deer Protection Act 1698	An Act for the Preservation of the Game, and the more easy Conviction of such as shall destroy the same.	In part, namely,— Section thirteen.
6 Anne c. 10 (I)	Administration of Justice Act 1707	An Act for the Amendment of the Law, and the better Advancement of Justice.	In part, namely,— Section one. Section two. Section three. Section four. Section five. Section seven. Section eleven. Section eighteen. Section twenty. Section twenty-one. Section twenty-two. In section twenty-three the words from " and the auditors " to the end of the section.
6 Anne c. 15 (I)	Outlawry Act 1707	An Act to supply the Defects, and for the better Execution of an Act, entituled, an Act for the avoiding of privy and secret Outlawries of His Majesty's Subjects in Personal Actions.	The whole act so far as unrepealed.
8 Anne c. 5 (I)	Assizes and Sessions Delays Act 1709	An Act to prevent Delays of Proceedings at the Assizes and Sessions.	The whole act.
2 Geo. 1. c. 11 (I)	Small Debts Recovery Act 1715	An Act for reviving and amending an Act, intituled, an Act for Recovery of small Debts in a summary Way, before the Judges of Assize.	The whole act, so far as unrepealed.
4 Geo. 1. c. 7 (I)	Barracks and Lighthouses Act 1717	An Act for Vesting in His Majesty, His Heirs and Successors, the several Lands, Tenements and Hereditaments, whereon the Barracks in this Kingdom are built, or building or contracted for, and whereon Lighthouses are or shall be built: and for making reasonable Satisfaction to the several Owners and Proprietors for the same; and likewise for amending an Act made in the sixth Year of her late Majesty's reign, intituled, An Act to prevent the Disorders that may happen by the Marching of Soldiers, and for providing Carriages for the Baggage of Soldiers in their March.	In part, namely,— Sections three, four, five and eight.
4 Geo. 1. c. 8 (I)	Officers' Fees Return Act 1717	An Act to oblige all Officers to return a List of their Fees by a Day certain.	The whole act, so far as unrepealed.
4 Geo. 1. c. 13 (I)	Frivolous Suits Act 1717	An Act for explaining and amending an Act of Parliament made in the ninth year of his late Majesty King William, intituled, An Act for the preventing frivolous and vexatious Law Suits; and giving Remedy to the Parties grieved to recover their Costs at Law in certain Cases, where heretofore no Costs were given.	The whole act.
6 Geo. 1. c. 5 (I)	Toleration Act 1719	An Act for exempting the Protestant Dissenters of this Kingdom from certain penalties, to which they are now subject.	In part, namely,— Section eight.
8 Geo. 1. c. 6 (I)	Law Amendment and Expiring Acts Act 1721	An Act for the further amendment of the Law, and for continuing and amending several acts near expiring.	The whole act, so far as unrepealed.
3 Geo. 2. c. 9 (I)	Sheriffs Act 1729	An Act for the further explaining and amending several statutes for prohibiting under sheriffs and sheriffs clerks from officiating as sub-sheriffs or sheriffs clerks more than one year; and to render more effectual an act to prevent fees being taken in certain cases; and to take away the pretended office of barony-clerk, and to oblige sheriffs to appoint deputies for granting replevins; and also for discharging of prisoners unable to pay their fees.	In part, namely,— Section three.
7 Geo. 2. c. 14 (I)	Relief of Mortgages Act 1733	An Act for the Relief of Mortgagees; and for making the Process in Courts of Equity more effectual against Mortgagors, who abscond and cannot be served therewith, and against persons, who being served refuse to appear; and also for better regulating the Payment of the Fees of Attornies and Solicitors.	The whole act.
11 Geo. 2. c. 6 (I)	Administration of Justice (Language) Act (Ireland) 1737	An Act that all Proceedings in Courts of Justice within this Kingdom shall be in the English Language.	In part, namely,— Section six.
13 Geo. 2. c. 9 (I)	Mortgagees Relief, Witnesses, and Christ Church Act 1739	An Act for explaining and amending an Act for the Relief of Mortgagees; and for the perpetuating the Testimony of Witnesses in Suits in Equity; and for impowering the Dean and Chapter of the Holy Trinity or Christ-Church Dublin to grant to His Majesty for any Term of Years the Rooms over the Room commonly called the Exchequer Chamber and other Rooms therein mentioned; and for amending a Misnomer in an Act to enable Charles Coote, Esquire, to raise Portions for younger Children.	The whole act, so far as unrepealed.
19 & 20 Geo. 3. c. 38 (I)	Frivolous Arrests Act 1779	An Act to prevent vexatious and frivolous arrests, and for other purposes.	The whole act, so far as unrepealed.
21 & 22 Geo. 3. c. 50 (I)	Courts Act 1781	An Act for securing the Independency of Judges, and the impartial Administration of Justice.	The whole act.
23 & 24 Geo. 3. c. 22 (I)	Funds in Chancery Act 1783	An Act for better securing the Monies and Effects of the Suitors of the Court of Chancery, and the Court of Exchequer, by depositing the same in the National Bank; and to prevent the forging and counterfeiting any Draft, Order, or other Voucher, for the Payment or Delivery of such Money or Effects, and for other Purposes.	The whole act, so far as unrepealed.
26 Geo. 3. c. 31 (I)	Writ of Scire Facias Act 1786	An Act for making more effectual an Act made in the Seventeenth Year of the Reign of His late Majesty King Charles the Second, Entitled, an Act to prevent Delays in extending Statutes, Judgments, and Recognizances, and for explaining an Act made in the Tenth Year of the Reign of His late Majesty King Charles the First, Entitled, An Act for Contentation of Debts upon execution.	The whole act.
28 Geo. 3. c. 24 (I)	Election of Lord Justice and Governor of Ireland Act 1788	An Act for repealing an Act made in the Thirty-third Year of the Reign of King Henry the Eighth, entitled, An Act for the Election of the Lord Justice, and also for the Election of a Lord Justice and Governor of this Realm upon the Event, and in the Manner therein mentioned.	The whole act, so far as unrepealed.
30 Geo. 3. c. 41 (I)	Funds in Chancery Act 1790	An Act for enabling the Lord High Chancellor, and the Court of Exchequer respectively, to make Orders on the Governor and Company of the Bank of Ireland for payment, out of the General Fund of monies belonging to the Suitors of the Courts of Chancery and Exchequer, the Sum therein mentioned, towards building the Principal Courts of Justice at Dublin, and Law Offices, and for amending an Act, Entitled, an Act for better securing the Monies and Effects of the Suitors of the Court of Chancery and Court of Exchequer, by depositing the same in the National Bank, and to prevent the forging and counterfeiting any Draft, Order or other Voucher, for the payment or delivery of such Money or Effects, and for other Purposes.	The whole act, so far as unrepealed.
36 Geo. 3. c. 1 (I)	National Debt Act (Ireland) 1796	An Act for securing the Payment of the Annuities, and of the Interest upon the Principal Sums therein provided for, and towards the Discharge of such Principal Sums in such Manner as therein is directed, and for enabling the Officers of His Majesty's Treasury to receive certain Sums for a limited Time, in Manner therein mentioned, and for granting to His Majesty certain Sum of Money out of the Consolidated Fund, and for applying a certain Sum of Money therein mentioned, for the Service of the Year One thousand seven hundred and ninety-six and for other purposes.	The whole act, so far as unrepealed.
38 Geo. 3. c. 39 (I)	Proctors' Bills of Costs Act 1798	An Act for the better ascertaining the Amount, and securing the payment of the Bills of Cost of Proctors, employed in carrying on and defending Suits and transacting Business in the High Court of Admiralty, in His Majesty's Court of Prerogative, in the Court of Delegates and in all Ecclesiastical Courts within the Kingdom of Ireland.	The whole act.
39 Geo. 3. c. 19 (I)	Cathedrals used as Parish Churches Act 1799	An Act for the Repairing of Cathedral Churches in Cases where the Parish Churches have been long in Ruins.	The whole act, so far as unrepealed.
40 Geo. 3. c. 69 (I)	Judicial Salaries and Pensions Act (Ireland) 1800	An Act to enable his Majesty to grant Annuities to the Lord High Chancellor, and to the Judges of the Court of King's Bench, Master of the Rolls, Judges of the Courts of Common Pleas and Exchequer, Judge or Commissionary of the Court of Prerogative, the Judge of the Court of Admiralty, the Chairman of the Quarter Sessions of the County of Dublin, and Assistant Barristers of the several other Counties, on the Resignation of their respective Offices and to amend an Act passed in the Thirty-sixth Year of his present Majesty, entitled, An Act for encreasing the Salaries of the Chief and other Judges of the Courts of King's Bench and Common Pleas, and of the Chief Baron and other Barons of the Court of Exchequer in this Kingdom.	In part, namely,— From the words " whereas it is expedient that His Majesty should be able to make appropriate provision " to the words " so as such annuity to be granted as aforesaid, together with the salary and profits of such other office shall together not exceed, in the whole, the said sum of four thousand pounds."

==== Third schedule: Enactments contained in Church Assembly Measures ====
Third schedule — Enactments contained in Church Assembly Measures
Citation	Short title	Extent of repeal
11 & 12 Geo. 5. No. 3	Union of Benefices Measure 1921	The whole measure.
12 & 13 Geo. 5. No. 2	Pluralities Act 1838 (Amendment) Measure 1922	The whole measure.
14 & 15 Geo. 5. No. 5	Diocese of Southwell (Division) Measure 1923	In part, namely,— Section thirteen subsection two. The Schedule.
16 & 17 Geo. 5. No. 1	Brislington Parishes Transfer Measure 1926	In part, namely,— Section three.
16 & 17 Geo. 5. No. 2	Rural Deaneries of Pontefract and Hemsworth (Transfer) Measure 1926	In part, namely,— Section three.
16 & 17 Geo. 5. No. 5	First Fruits and Tenths Measure 1926	In part, namely,— The second Schedule.
16 & 17 Geo. 5. No. 8	Benefices (Ecclesiastical Duties) Measure 1926	In part, namely,— The third Schedule.
19 & 20 Geo. 5. No. 2	Representation of the Laity Measure 1929	In part, namely,— Section two.
19 & 20 Geo. 5. No. 3	Ecclesiastical Dilapidations (Amendment) Measure 1929	In part, namely,— Section ten subsection six.
20 & 21 Geo. 5. No. 6	Clergy Pensions (Older Incumbents) Measure 1930	In part, namely,— Section eleven.
21 & 22 Geo. 5. No. 1	Episcopal Pensions (Sodor and Man) Measure 1931	In part, namely,— Section three.
21 & 22 Geo. 5. No. 7	Cathedrals Measure 1931	In part, namely,— Section thirty-one and the third schedule.
23 & 24 Geo. 5. No. 2	Wythenshawe Parishes (Transfer) Measure 1933	In part, namely,— Section three.
25 & 26 Geo. 5. No. 2	Farnham Castle Measure 1935	In part, namely,— Section two paragraph (iii).
26 Geo. 5 & 1 Edw. 8. No. 2	Union of Benefices (Amendment) Measure 1936	In part, namely,— Section two subsection two and section seventeen subsection two.
1 & 2 Geo. 6. No. 3	Parsonages Measure 1938	In part, namely,— Section twenty-three.
2 & 3 Geo. 6. No. 3	Clergy (National Emergency Precautions) Measure 1939	The whole measure.
6 & 7 Geo. 6. No. 1	New Parishes Measure 1943	In part, namely,— Section thirty-two subsection one from " The enactments " to " Provided that:—". The Schedule.
7 & 8 Geo. 6. No. 1	Reorganisation Areas Measure 1944	In part, namely,— Section fifty-six and third Schedule.
8 & 9 Geo. 6. No. 1	Emergency Legislation Measure 1944	In part, namely,— Section ten.
8 & 9 Geo. 6. No. 2	Episcopal Pensions Measure 1945	In part, namely,— Section nine.

== Subsequent developments ==
Section 1 of, and the first, second and third schedules to, the act were repealed by section 1 of, and the first schedule to, the Statute Law Revision Act 1953 (2 & 3 Eliz. 2. c. 5), which came into force on 18 December 1953.

The words "to the court of the county palatine of Lancaster or" in section 2 of the act were repealed by section 56(4) of, and part II of schedule 11 to, the Courts Act 1971, which came into force on 1 January 1972.

Section 5(4) of the act was repealed by section 41(1) of, and part I of schedule 6 to, the Northern Ireland Constitution Act 1973, which came into force on 18 July 1973.

Section 2 of the act was repealed by section 32(4) of, and part V of schedule 5 to, the Administration of Justice Act 1977, which came into force on 29 July 1977.

The enactments which were repealed (whether for the whole or any part of the United Kingdom) by the act were repealed so far as they extended to the Isle of Man by section 1(1) of, and schedule 1 to, the Statute Law Revision (Isle of Man) Act 1991, which came into force on 25 July 1991.

Section 3(1) of the act from "the Union" to "Ceylon" and the word "Burma", and section 5(3) of the act were repealed by section 1(1) of, and group 1 of part XVI of schedule 1 to, the Statute Law (Repeals) Act 1993, which came into force on 5 November 1993.

Section 3(2) of the act was repealed by section 1(1) of, and group 1 of part IX of schedule 1 to, the Statute Law (Repeals) Act 1998, which came into force on 19 November 1998.

== See also ==
- Statute Law Revision Act

== Bibliography ==
- Halsbury's Statutes. Fourth Edition. 2008 Reissue. Volume 41. Page 759.
- Current Law Statutes Annotated 1950. Part 1. Sweet & Maxwell. Stevens and Sons. W Green & Son.
- HL Deb vol 166, cols 197 to 199 (second reading), HC Deb vol 475, col 1480 to 1481
