= De heretico comburendo =

1401 Act of the Parliament of England

- Act of Parliament
- Parliament of England
- Long title: The orthodoxy of the faith of the church of England asserted, and provision made against the oppugners of the same; with the punishment of Hereticks.
- Citation: 2 Hen. 4. c. 15
- Territorial extent: England and Wales; Ireland

Dates
- Royal assent: 10 March 1401
- Commencement: 20 January 1401 (Note: Start of session.)
- Repealed: 23 January 1559
Other legislation
Amended by	Revival of the Heresy Acts; Act of Supremacy 1558
Repealed by	Statute Law (Ireland) Revision Act 1872
Relates to	Heresy Act 1382; Suppression of Heresy Act 1414

Status: Repealed

Text of statute as originally enacted

De heretico comburendo or the Suppression of Heresy Act 1400 (2 Hen. 4. c. 15) was an act of the Parliament of England passed under King Henry IV of England in 1401 for the suppression of the Lollards. The act punished seditious heretics with burning at the stake. The act was one of the strictest religious censorship statutes ever enacted in England, affecting preaching and possession of Lollard literature.

== Meaning and linguistics ==
De heretico comburendo is a Latin phrase meaning "On the subject of heretics to be burnt". An alternate spelling is De haeretico comburendo, reflecting the proper ancient and Middle Ages spelling (by the second century the diphthong ae had been changed in pronunciation from [ae̯] to [e]; most texts today use the spelling without the letter a). See Latin spelling and pronunciation for more information.

== Details ==
The statute declared there were "divers false and perverse people of a certain new sect…preach and teach…divers new doctrines, and wicked heretical and erroneous opinions contrary…of the Holy Church, and…they make unlawful conventicles and confederacies, they hold and exercise schools, they make and write books, they do wickedly instruct and inform people, and as such they may excite and stir them to sedition and insurrection, and make great strife and division among the people, and…do perpetrate and commit subversion of the said catholic faith…".

De heretico comburendo urged "that this wicked sect, preachings, doctrines, and opinions, should from henceforth cease and be utterly destroyed", and declared "that all and singular having such books or any writings of such wicked doctrine and opinions, shall really with effect deliver or cause to be delivered all such books and writings to the diocesan of the same place within forty days from the time of the proclamation of this ordinance and statute".

"And if any person ... such books in the form aforesaid do not deliver, then the diocesan of the same place in his diocese such person or persons in this behalf defamed or evidently suspected and every of them may by the authority of the said ordinance and statute cause to be arrested". If they failed to abjure their heretical beliefs, or relapsed after an initial abjuration, they would "be burnt, that such punishment may strike fear into the minds of others".

== History ==
Radical English theologian John Wycliffe of the University of Oxford wrote several books that inspired what would become the Lollard movement, which was considered seditious by the state and heretical by the Church. The Lollards went beyond Wycliffe in several areas, explicitly rejecting the authority of the Church.

In March 1401 William Sawtrey became the first Lollard to be burned.

The Oxford Constitutions, established in 1409 by Archbishop Thomas Arundel, were further punitive measures intended to punish heresy in England that grew in large part out of the De heretico comburendo

The Suppression of Heresy Act 1414 (2 Hen. 5. Stat. 1. c. 7) clarified the procedures by which heresy charges could be brought and prosecuted by state officials.

According to Edward Coke, in Hil. 9 Jac. I. (Note: Hilary Term in the ninth year of James I's reign – that is, 1612) he was consulted about whether "this writ De heretico comburendo lieth" upon a conviction for heresy before an "Ordinary" court. According to Coke, the magistrates "certify the King, that a writ De heretico comburendo lieth upon a conviction before the Ordinary, but that the most convenient and sure way was to convict a heretic before the High Commissioners." His editor adds that the writ is abrogated by the Ecclesiastical Jurisdiction Act 1677 (29 Cha. 2. c. 9).

The act was extended to Ireland by Poynings' Law 1495 (10 Hen. 7 c. 22 (I)).

Section 6 of the Act of Supremacy 1558 (1 Eliz. 1. c. 1) (1559) repealed the statutes but it was not until March 1677 that a bill to take away the Crown's right to the writ was introduced in the House of Commons. It passed in that session. The writ was abolished by the Ecclesiastical Jurisdiction Act 1677 (29 Cha. 2. c. 9) in England, and in 1695 in Ireland.

The whole act was repealed for Ireland by the Statute Law (Ireland) Revision Act 1872 (35 & 36 Vict. c. 98).

== Controversy: Vernacular Bibles ==
Although partial English translations and metrical paraphrases of the Bible had existed for hundreds of years, the Middle English translations published under the direction of John Wycliffe in the 1380s, known as Wycliffe's Bibles, were the first complete translations and the first to gain widespread acceptance and use. De heretico comburendo does not mention language or translation.

According to some scholars, English Church authorities condemned editions of the Wycliffite translations not only because they deemed the commentary sometimes included with the work to be heretical, but because they feared a vernacular translation of the Bible from the Latin Vulgate, absent appropriate, Catechists/Catechism would lead the ignorant laity to reject Church authority and fall into heresy. (De heretico comburendo was an act of the English parliament, not by the Church.)

== See also ==
- Britain in the Middle Ages
- History of the English Bible
- Inquisition
- Censorship of the Bible
