= Ecclesiastical Courts Jurisdiction Act 1860 =

Act of the Parliament of the United Kingdom

Ecclesiastical Courts Jurisdiction Act 1860 (Note: The citation of this act by this short title was authorised by section 1 of, and the first schedule to, the Short Titles Act 1896. Due to the repeal of those provisions it is now authorised by section 19(2) of the Interpretation Act 1978.)
- Act of Parliament
- Parliament of the United Kingdom
- Long title: An Act to abolish the Jurisdiction of the Ecclesiastical Courts [in Ireland in Cases of Defamation, and] in England and Ireland in certain Cases of Brawling. (Note: Words in brackets omitted by the Statute Law Revision Act 1892.)
- Citation: 23 & 24 Vict. c. 32
- Territorial extent: England and Wales; Ireland; (Note: Sections 2 and 3.)

Dates
- Royal assent: 3 July 1860
- Commencement: 3 July 1860 (Note: The Acts of Parliament (Commencement) Act 1793.)
Other legislation
| Amended by | Statute Law Revision Act 1875; Summary Jurisdiction Act 1884; Ecclesiastical Jurisdiction Measure 1963; Statute Law (Repeals) Act 1969 |

Status: Amended

Text of statute as originally enacted

Text of the Ecclesiastical Courts Jurisdiction Act 1860 as in force today (including any amendments) within the United Kingdom, from legislation.gov.uk.

The Ecclesiastical Courts Jurisdiction Act 1860 (ECJA) (23 & 24 Vict. c. 32) is an act of the Parliament of the United Kingdom. It is one of the Ecclesiastical Courts Acts 1787 to 1860.

== Sections still in force ==
=== Section 2 ===
Section 2 provides that it is not lawful for any person to behave in a 'riotous, violent, or indecent' way in a number of religious locations, whether during 'the celebration of divine service or at any other time'. Locations include cathedral, parish and district churches, chapels of the Church of England or other religious denominations or locations outlined in the Places of Worship Registration Act 1855. Locations also include any churchyards or burial grounds.

Furthermore, Section 2 states that it is not lawful for any person to interfere with any preacher or clergyman in any cathedral, church, chapel, churchyard or burial ground, by way of molesting, letting, disturbing, vexing, troubling or by 'any other unlawful means disquiet or misuse'.

If a person is found guilty of those offences, they are liable to a fine or imprisonment of up to two months.

=== Section 3 ===
Section 3 relates to Section 2, stating that a person 'in the premises after the said mis-demeanor' may be apprehended by a constable or church warden and taken before a magistrates' court.

=== Section 4 ===
Section 4 also relates to Section 2, stating that a person who is 'aggrieved' by their conviction under Section 2, may appeal it at a Crown Court.

This section was repealed in Ireland by the Statute Law Revision Act 1983.

=== Section 7 ===
Section 7 states that 'provided also, that nothing herein contained shall limit, restrain or abolish the power possessed by the ordinary over the fabric of any church or over the churchyard or burial ground connected therewith'.

This section was repealed in Ireland by the Statute Law Revision Act 1983.

== Repealed sections ==
All of the following that were not already repealed at independence were repealed in Ireland by the Statute Law Revision Act 1983.

=== Section 1 ===
Section 1 provided that it was not lawful for an ecclesiastical court in England or Ireland to entertain or adjudicate on a suit or cause of brawling or defamation against any person not in holy orders.

Where a person had been committed to gaol under a writ de contumace capiendo, that person was to be discharged.

=== Section 5 ===
Section 5 of the act repealed the Brawling Act 1551 (5 & 6 Edw. 6. c. 4).

=== Section 6 ===
Section 6 of the act provided that nothing contained hereinbefore in the act was to be taken to repeal or alter the Brawling Act 1553 (1 Mar. Sess. 2 c. 3), the Act of Uniformity 1558 (1 Eliz. 1 c. 2) or section 18 of the Toleration Act 1688 (1 Will. & Mar. c. 18).

== Subsequent developments ==
Section 5 of the act was repealed by section 1 of, and the schedule to, the Statute Law Revision Act 1875 (38 & 39 Vict. c. 66), which came into force on 11 August 1875.

Section 6 of the act was repealed by section 1 of, and part II of the schedule to, the Statute Law (Repeals) Act 1969, which came into force on 1 January 1970.

Section 1 of the act was repealed by section 87 of, and the fifth schedule to, the Ecclesiastical Jurisdiction Measure 1963 (No. 1), which came into force on 1 March 1965.

In 1966, a church service at the Labour Party Conference in Blackpool was interrupted by several protesters calling out, angered by the Labour government's stand on Vietnam. Under Section 2 of the Act, one of the group was sentenced to two months in prison and a £200 fine.

In 1998, campaigners from OutRage! interrupted a service at Canterbury Cathedral led by Archbishop George Carey, climbing into the pulpit to protest his "support for discrimination against lesbians and gay men". Under Section 2 of the Act, Peter Tatchell was fined £18.60 and ordered to pay costs of £320.

In 2002, the First Report of the House of Lords' Select Committee on Religious Offences in England and Wales discussed the 1860 act. It states that Home Office statistics for the six years 1997–2002 showed 60 prosecutions under the act, leading to 21 convictions. In his evidence to the Committee, David Calvert-Smith, the Director of Public Prosecutions, said that: "We use it sufficiently often or have used it in the past for it obviously to be the right offence to use and a redrafted Section 2 would probably be a (albeit infrequently used) valuable offence." Peter Tatchell submitted that his 1998 charge of "indecent behaviour" was both inappropriately named and a violation of his right to peaceful protest.

After the "Alan Turing Law" was passed in 2017 to pardon those convicted under specific obsolete laws which had criminalised homosexual acts, Peter Tatchell complained that the pardons did not encompass convictions targeting homosexual behaviour under other laws, including the Ecclesiastical Courts Jurisdiction Act 1860.
