= Suppression of Heresy Act 1414 =

Act of the Parliament of England

- Act of Parliament
- Parliament of England
- Long title: The intent of the hereticks called Lollards. Magistrates shall assist the ordinaries in extirpating heresies and punishing hereticks. Penalty on hereticks convited.
- Citation: 2 Hen. 5. Stat. 1. c. 7
- Territorial extent: England and Wales; Ireland

Dates
- Royal assent: 29 May 1414
- Commencement: 30 April 1414 (Note: Start of session.)
- Repealed: 10 August 1872
Other legislation
Amends	Treason Act 1547; Act of Supremacy 1558
Amended by	Statute of the Six Articles; Revival of the Heresy Acts
Repealed by	Statute Law (Ireland) Revision Act 1872
Relates to	Heresy Act 1382; De heretico comburendo

Status: Repealed

Text of statute as originally enacted

The Suppression of Heresy Act 1414 (2 Hen. 5. Stat. 1. c. 7) was an act of the Parliament of England. The act made heresy an offence against the common law and temporal officers were to swear to help the spiritual officers in the suppression of heresy. Justices of the peace were given the power of inquiry; to issue an order to arrest; and to hand over the suspected heretic to the ecclesiastical court for trial.

After arrest and allocation to a diocese, the initial vetting as to whether the person has heresies, errours, or Lolardies was up to the local bishops (the "ordinaries") – secular authorities were not to make spiritual judgements – if the bishop found no serious or persistent heresy, the accused was then, in theory, protected from the secular authorities. The discovery of Lollard literature by sheriffs was not to be taken as direct evidence of heresy etc., but just as information: the indicted person is innocent until proven guilty and the bishops must establish the truth themselves and not rely on the claims of the indictment presented to them:

...þe sayd indightmentes be not taken in evidence but onely for information before the Judges spirituall, agaynst such persons indighted: but that the Ordinaries begin their proces agaynst such persons indited, in the same maner, as though no such iudgement were, hauyng no regarde to such inditementes.

— an. 2. Henrici. 5. cap. 7

If found to be heretics, they should be handed back to the secular authority and have a jury trial of men of independent means.

== Controversy: Spurious quotation ==
A typical modern English rendition of a notorious section of the act has it

that whoever should read the Scriptures in English (which was then called Wicliffe's Learning) should forfeit land, cattle, goods, and life, and be condemned as heretics to God, enemies to the crown, and traitors to the kingdom; that they should not have the benefit of any sanctuary, though this was a privilege then granted to the most notorious malefactors; and that, if they continued obstinate, or relapsed after pardon, they should first be hanged for treason against the king, and then burned for heresy against God.

— Quotation in Medley, A Student's Manual of English Constitutional History

However, those words do not seem to appear in the act; they summarize and interpret the act, with some embellishment, but at some time have been mistaken as the actual words of the act. The phrase Wycliffe's learning in modern English is Wycliffe's teachings which are not fairly summarized as only "reading the Scriptures in English," but involve his teaching of the illegitimacy of rule by those in mortal sin, etc.

John Foxe in Acts and Monuments provided an English translation of the Latin act. 1576 edition has his introductory text:

a statute was made to this effect: that all and singular such as were of Wickliffes learnyng, if they would not geve over (as in case of felony and other trespasses, loosing all their goodes to the kyng) should suffer death in two maner of kindes, that is, they should first be hanged for treasō against the kyng, and then be burned for heresie agaynst God. &c.

— John Foxe

Foxe then gives the 1415 act in English translation. The equivalent passages seem to be first that judicial officials:

have full power to inquire of all such, which hold any errours or heresies, as Lolardes and who be their maintainours, recevours, factours, and sustainers, common writers of such bookes, as well of their Sermons as scholes, conventicles, congregations, and confederacies, …all persons convicte of heresie of what soever estate, condition or degree they be, by the sayd ordinaries (Note: i.e., the local bishops) or their commissaries left unto the secular power accordyng to the lawes of holy Church, shall leese and forfaite all their landes and tenementes, whiche they have in fee simple in maner and forme as foloweth: That is to say that the kyng shal have all the landes & tenementes, which the sayd convictes have in fee simple & which be immediatly holden of hym, as forfaited

— an. 2. Henrici. 5. cap. 7

Indeed, on John Foxe's reading he cannot find that this act explicitly allowed burning of Lollard heretics: "by what lawe or statute of the realme were these men brent?" Furthermore, Foxe denied having written in a previous edition that "there was no other cause of devising this sharpe law & punishmēt against these men, but onely for havyng the Scripture bookes," which he said was a misreading of a margin note.

== Legacy ==
The act was extended to Ireland by Poynings' Law 1495 (10 Hen. 7. c. 22 (I)).

The act was annulled and made void by section 2 of the Statute of the Six Articles (25 Hen. 8. c. 14).

The whole act was repealed for England and Wales by the Act of Supremacy 1558 (1 Eliz. 1. c. 1) and Ireland by the Statute Law (Ireland) Revision Act 1872 (35 & 36 Vict. c. 98).

== See also ==
- De heretico comburendo
- Oxford Constitutions
