= List of acts of the Parliament of England from 1640 =

This is a list of acts of the Parliament of England for the year 1640.

For acts passed during the period 1707–1800, see the list of acts of the Parliament of Great Britain. See also the list of acts of the Parliament of Scotland, and the list of acts of the Parliament of Ireland.

For acts passed from 1801 onwards, see the list of acts of the Parliament of the United Kingdom. For acts of the devolved parliaments and assemblies in the United Kingdom, see the list of acts of the Scottish Parliament, the list of acts of the Northern Ireland Assembly, and the list of acts and measures of Senedd Cymru; see also the list of acts of the Parliament of Northern Ireland.

For medieval statutes, etc. that are not considered to be acts of Parliament, see the list of English statutes.

See also the List of ordinances and acts of the Parliament of England, 1642–1660 for ordinances and acts passed by the Long Parliament and other bodies without royal assent, and which were not considered to be valid legislation following the Restoration in 1660.

The number shown after each act's title is its chapter number. Acts are cited using this number, preceded by the years of the reign during which the relevant parliamentary session was held; thus the Union with Ireland Act 1800 is cited as "39 & 40 Geo. 3. c. 67", meaning the 67th act passed during the session that started in the 39th year of the reign of George III and which finished in the 40th year of that reign. The modern convention is to use Arabic numerals in citations (thus "41 Geo. 3" rather than "41 Geo. III"). Acts of the last session of the Parliament of Great Britain and the first session of the Parliament of the United Kingdom are both cited as "41 Geo. 3".

Acts passed by the Parliament of England did not have a short title; however, some of these acts have subsequently been given a short title by acts of the Parliament of the United Kingdom, such as the Short Titles Act 1896 (59 & 60 Vict. c. 14).

Acts passed by the Parliament of England were deemed to have come into effect on the first day of the session in which they were passed. Because of this, the years given in the list below may in fact be the year before a particular act was passed.

== 16 Cha. 1 ==
The first session of the 5th Parliament of King Charles I (the 'Long Parliament') which met from 3 November 1640 until 21 August 1642.

Note that this session was traditionally cited as 16 Car. 1, 16 Chas. 1 or 16 C. 1; it is listed in the "Chronological Table of the Statutes" as 16 Cha. 1

Private act c. 1 is printed as public act c. 38 in The Statutes of the Realm; it is also listed in the Chronological Table of the Statutes as c. 38.

Acts in this session were passed between 1641 and 1642.

=== Public acts ===
| Short title | Citation | Royal assent |
Long title
| Triennial Act 1640 or the Triennial Act 1641 or the Dissolution Act 1640 (repealed) | 16 Cha. 1. c. 1 | 16 February 1641 |
An Act for preventing of Inconveniences happening by the long Intermission of Parliaments. (Repealed by Triennial Parliaments Act 1664 (16 Cha. 2. c. 1))
| Taxation Act 1640 (repealed) | 16 Cha. 1. c. 2 | 16 February 1641 |
An Act for Relief of His Majesty's Army and the Northern Parts of the Kingdom. (Repealed by Statute Law Revision Act 1863 (26 & 27 Vict. c. 125))
| Taxation (No. 2) Act 1640 (repealed) | 16 Cha. 1. c. 3 | 25 March 1641 |
An Act for the reforming of some things mistaken in the late act made in this present parliament for the granting of four subsidies, intituled, "An act for the relief of his Majesty's army, and the northern parts of this kingdom," (Note: Taxation Act 1640 (16 Cha. 1. c. 2)) and to make good the acts of the commissions and other officers by them authorized or appointed, and to be authorized or appointed. (Repealed by Statute Law Revision Act 1863 (26 & 27 Vict. c. 125))
| Taxation (No. 3) Act 1640 (repealed) | 16 Cha. 1. c. 4 | 13 May 1641 |
An Act for the relief of his Majesty's army, and the northern parts of the kingdom. (Repealed by Statute Law Revision Act 1950 (14 Geo. 6. c. 6))
| Impressment of Seamen Act 1640 (repealed) | 16 Cha. 1. c. 5 | 13 May 1641 |
An Act for the better raising and levying of mariners, sailors and others for the present guarding of the seas, and necessary defence of the realm. (Repealed by Statute Law Revision Act 1863 (26 & 27 Vict. c. 125))
| Michaelmas Term Act 1640 (repealed) | 16 Cha. 1. c. 6 | 13 May 1641 |
An Act concerning the limitation and abbreviation of Michaelmas term. (Repealed by Statute Law Revision Act 1863 (26 & 27 Vict. c. 125))
| Parliament Act 1640 (repealed) | 16 Cha. 1. c. 7 | 10 May 1641 |
An Act to prevent inconveniences which may happen by the untimely adjourning, proroguing, or dissolving this present Parliament. (Repealed by Statute Law Revision Act 1863 (26 & 27 Vict. c. 125))
| Tonnage and Poundage Act 1640 (repealed) | 16 Cha. 1. c. 8 | 22 June 1641 |
A subsidy granted to the King of tonnage, poundage, and other sums of money payable upon merchandize exported and imported. (Repealed by Statute Law Revision Act 1863 (26 & 27 Vict. c. 125))
| Taxation (No. 4) Act 1640 (repealed) | 16 Cha. 1. c. 9 | 3 July 1641 |
An Act for the speedy Provision of Money, for disbanding the Armies and settling the Peace of the Two Kingdoms of England and Scotland. (Repealed by Statute Law Revision Act 1863 (26 & 27 Vict. c. 125))
| Habeas Corpus Act 1640 (repealed) | 16 Cha. 1. c. 10 | 5 July 1641 |
An Act for the regulating of the privy council, and for taking away the court commonly called the star-chamber. (Repealed by Statute Law Revision Act 1863 (26 & 27 Vict. c. 125) and Justices of the Peace Act 1968 (c. 69))
| Abolition of High Commission Court Act 1640 or the Ecclesiastical Causes Act 1640 or the High Commission Abolition Act 1641 or the Abolition of the Court of High Commission Act 1640 or the High Commission Court Abolition Act 1640 or the Act for the Abolition of the High Commission 1640 or the Act for the Abolition of the High Commission Court 1640 or the Act for the Abolition of the Court of High Commission 1640 (repealed) | 16 Cha. 1. c. 11 | 5 July 1641 |
A repeal of a branch of a statute primo Elizabethæ, (Note: Act of Supremacy 1558 (1 Eliz. 1. c. 1)) concerning commissions for causes ecclesiastical. (Repealed by Ecclesiastical Jurisdiction Measure 1963 (No. 1))
| Taxation (No. 5) Act 1640 (repealed) | 16 Cha. 1. c. 12 | 12 July 1641 |
A subsidy granted to the King of tonnage and poundage, and other sums of money payable upon merchandizes exported and imported. (Repealed by Statute Law Revision Act 1863 (26 & 27 Vict. c. 125))
| Payment for Billets Act 1640 (repealed) | 16 Cha. 1. c. 13 | 7 August 1641 |
An Act for the securing of such Monies as are or shall be due to the Inhabitants of the County of Yorke, and the other adjoining Counties, wherein His Majesty's Army is or hath been billeted, for the Billet of the Soldiers of the said Army; as also to certain Officers of the said Army, who do forbear Part of their Pay, according to an Order in that Behalf made in the House of Commons this present Session, for such Part of their Pay as they shall forbear. (Repealed by Statute Law Revision Act 1863 (26 & 27 Vict. c. 125))
| Ship Money Act 1640 (repealed) | 16 Cha. 1. c. 14 | 7 August 1641 |
An Act for the declaring unlawful and void the late Proceedings touching Ship-money, and for the vacating of all Records and Process concerning the same. (Repealed by Statute Law Revision Act 1888 (51 & 52 Vict. c. 3) and Statute Law (Repeals) Act 1969 (c. 52))
| Stannaries Court Act 1640 (repealed) | 16 Cha. 1. c. 15 | 7 August 1641 |
An Act against divers Incroachments and Oppressions in the Stannary Courts. (Repealed by Stannaries Court (Abolition) Act 1896 (59 & 60 Vict. c. 45))
| Delimitation of Forests Act 1640 or Selden's Act (repealed) | 16 Cha. 1. c. 16 | 7 August 1641 |
An Act for the Certainty of Forests, and of the Meers, Metes, Limits, and Bounds of the Forests. (Repealed by Wild Creatures and Forest Laws Act 1971 (c. 47))
| Pacification, England and Scotland Act 1640 (repealed) | 16 Cha. 1. c. 17 | 10 August 1641 |
An Act for the Confirmation of the Treaty of Pacification between the Two Kingdoms of England and Scotland. (Repealed by Statute Law Revision Act 1863 (26 & 27 Vict. c. 125))
| Payment to Scotland Act 1640 (repealed) | 16 Cha. 1. c. 18 | 10 August 1641 |
An Act for securing by Publick Faith the Remainder of the Friendly Assistance and Relief promised to our Brethren of Scotland. (Repealed by Statute Law Revision Act 1863 (26 & 27 Vict. c. 125))
| Clerk of the Market Act 1640 (repealed) | 16 Cha. 1. c. 19 | 10 August 1641 |
An Act for the better ordering and regulating of the Office of the Clerk of the Market, allowed and confirmed by this Statute; and for the Reformation of false Weights and Measures. (Repealed by Statute Law Revision Act 1863 (26 & 27 Vict. c. 125))
| Knighthood Act 1640 (repealed) | 16 Cha. 1. c. 20 | 10 August 1641 |
An Act for the Prevention of vexatious Proceedings touching the Order of Knighthood. (Repealed by Statute Law Revision Act 1863 (26 & 27 Vict. c. 125))
| Gunpowder Act 1640 (repealed) | 16 Cha. 1. c. 21 | 10 August 1641 |
An Act for the free bringing in of Gunpowder and Salt-petre from Foreign Parts, and for the free making of Gunpowder in this Realm. (Repealed by Statute Law Revision Act 1863 (26 & 27 Vict. c. 125))
| Subsidy Act 1640 (repealed) | 16 Cha. 1. c. 22 | 2 December 1641 |
A subsidy granted to the King of tonnage and poundage, and other sums of money, payable upon merchandize exported and imported. (Repealed by Statute Law Revision Act 1863 (26 & 27 Vict. c. 125))
| Impressment of Seamen (No. 2) Act 1640 (repealed) | 16 Cha. 1. c. 23 | 15 January 1642 |
An Act for pressing of Mariners and Sailors, for the present Guarding of the Seas, and the Defence of His Majesty's Dominions. (Repealed by Impressment of Seamen (No. 3) Act 1640 (16 Cha. 1. c. 26))
| Piracy Act 1640 (repealed) | 16 Cha. 1. c. 24 | 15 January 1642 |
An Act for the freeing of the Captives at Algier; and to prevent the taking of others. (Repealed by Statute Law Revision Act 1863 (26 & 27 Vict. c. 125))
| Taxation (No. 6) Act 1640 (repealed) | 16 Cha. 1. c. 25 | 31 January 1642 |
A subsidy granted to the King of tonnage and poundage, and other sums of money, payable upon merchandize exported and imported. (Repealed by Statute Law Revision Act 1863 (26 & 27 Vict. c. 125))
| Impressment of Seamen (No. 3) Act 1640 (repealed) | 16 Cha. 1. c. 26 | 4 February 1642 |
An Act for the better raising and levying of Mariners, Sailors, and others, for the present guarding of the Seas, and necessary Defence of this Realm and other of His Majesty's Dominions. (Repealed for England and Wales by Statute Law Revision Act 1863 (26 & 27 Vict. c. 125) and for Northern Ireland by Statute Law Revision Act 1950 (14 Geo. 6. c. 6))
| Clergy Act 1640 or the Bishops Exclusion Act 1640 or the Clerical Disabilities Act 1640 (repealed) | 16 Cha. 1. c. 27 | 14 February 1642 |
An Act for the disenabling all persons in holy orders to exercise any temporal jurisdiction or authority. (Repealed by Clergy Act 1661 (13 Cha. 2 St. 1. c. 2))
| Impressment of Soldiers Act 1640 (repealed) | 16 Cha. 1. c. 28 | 14 February 1642 |
An Act for the raising of soldiers for the defence of England and Ireland. (Repealed for England and Wales by Statute Law Revision Act 1863 (26 & 27 Vict. c. 125) and for Northern Ireland by Statute Law Revision Act 1950 (14 Geo. 6. c. 6))
| Subsidy Act 1640 (repealed) | 16 Cha. 1. c. 29 | 16 August 1641 |
A Subsidy granted to the King of Tonnage and Poundage and other Sums of Money payable upon Merchandize exported and imported. (Repealed by Statute Law Revision Act 1863 (26 & 27 Vict. c. 125))
| Relief of Ireland Act 1640 (repealed) | 16 Cha. 1. c. 30 | 31 January 1642 |
An Act for a contribution and loan for the distressed people of Ireland. (Repealed for England and Wales by Statute Law Revision Act 1863 (26 & 27 Vict. c. 125) and for Northern Ireland by Statute Law Revision Act 1950 (14 Geo. 6. c. 6))
| Taxation (No. 7) Act 1640 (repealed) | 16 Cha. 1. c. 31 | 29 March 1642 |
A Subsidy granted to the King of Tonnage and Poundage and other Sums of Money payable upon Merchandizes exported and imported. (Repealed by Statute Law Revision Act 1863 (26 & 27 Vict. c. 125))
| Taxation (No. 8) Act 1640 (repealed) | 16 Cha. 1. c. 32 | 26 March 1642 |
An Act for the raising and levying of Monies for the necessary Defence, and great Affairs of the Kingdoms of England and Ireland, and for the Payment of Debts undertaken by Parliament. (Repealed by for England and Wales by Statute Law Revision Act 1863 (26 & 27 Vict. c. 125) and for Northern Ireland by Statute Law Revision Act 1950 (14 Geo. 6. c. 6))
| Adventurers' Act 1640 (repealed) | 16 Cha. 1. c. 33 | 19 March 1642 |
An Act for reducing the rebels in Ireland to their obedience to his Majesty and the crown of England. (Repealed for England and Wales by Statute Law Revision Act 1863 (26 & 27 Vict. c. 125) and for Northern Ireland by Statute Law Revision Act 1950 (14 Geo. 6. c. 6))
| Lands of Irish Rebels (Adventurers' Subscriptions) Act 1640 (repealed) | 16 Cha. 1. c. 34 | 6 April 1642 |
An Act for the explanation of a former act for reducing the rebels in Ireland. (Repealed for Northern Ireland by Statute Law Revision Act 1950 (14 Geo. 6. c. 6))
| Lands of Irish Rebels (Adventurers' Subscriptions) (No. 2) Act 1640 (repealed) | 16 Cha. 1. c. 35 | 22 April 1642 |
An Act to enable Corporations and Bodies Politic to participate of the Benefit of an Act lately passed, intituled, "An Act for the speedy and effectual reducing of the Rebels in His Majesty's Kingdom of Ireland to their due Obedience to his Majesty and the Crown of England." (Note: Adventurers' Act 1640 (16 Cha. 1. c. 33)) (Repealed for Northern Ireland by Statute Law Revision Act 1950 (14 Geo. 6. c. 6))
| Taxation (No. 9) Act 1640 (repealed) | 16 Cha. 1. c. 36 | 3 May 1642 |
A Subsidy granted to the King of Tonnage, Poundage, and other Sums of Money payable upon Merchandize exported and imported. (Repealed by Statute Law Revision Act 1863 (26 & 27 Vict. c. 125))
| Irish Rebels Act 1640 (repealed) | 16 Cha. 1. c. 37 | 22 June 1642 |
An Act for the further Advancement of an effectual and speedy Reduction of the Rebels in Ireland to the Obedience of His Majesty and the Crown of England. (Repealed for England and Wales by Statute Law Revision Act 1863 (26 & 27 Vict. c. 125) and for Northern Ireland Statute Law Revision Act 1950)
| Earl of Strafford's Attainder Act 1640 (repealed) | 16 Cha. 1. c. 38 (Note: Also cited as 16 Cha. 1. c. 1 Pr..) | 10 May 1641 |
An Act for the Attainder of Thomas Earl of Strafford for High Treason. (Repealed by Strafford Attainder Act 1662 (14 Cha. 2. c. 29))

=== Private acts ===
| Short title | Citation | Royal assent |
Long title
| Earl of Strafford's Attainder Act 1640 (repealed) | 16 Cha. 1. c. 1 Pr. (Note: Also cited as 16 Cha. 1. c. 38.) | 10 May 1641 |
An Act for the Attainder of Thomas Earl of Strafford for High Treason. (Repealed by Strafford Attainder Act 1662 (14 Cha. 2. c. 29))
| Marquis of Winchester's Estate Act 1640 | 16 Cha. 1. c. 2 Pr. | 27 May 1641 |
An Act to enable the marquis of Winchester to grant estates for three lives or one and twenty years, &c. of lands in the county of Southampton, &c. reserving the old rents.
| Naturalization of Dorothy Spencer Act 1640 | 16 Cha. 1. c. 3 Pr. | 27 May 1641 |
An Act for naturalizing of Dorothy Spencer, daughter of Henry lord Spencer, baron Spencer of Wormleighton.
| Earl of Winchelsea's Estate Act 1640: sale and leasing of lands for payment of debts. | 16 Cha. 1. c. 4 Pr. | 27 May 1641 |
An Act for enabling the sale and leasing of lands for payment of the debts of Thomas late earl of Winchelsea.
| Estate of Elizabeth, Dowager Countess of Exeter Act 1640 | 16 Cha. 1. c. 5 Pr. | 22 June 1641 |
An Act for the settling and estating upon the right honourable the lady Elizabeth countess dowager of Exeter, her heirs and assigns for ever, the scite of the hospital of Saint Leonards without the town of Newarke upon Trent in the county of Nottingham, with the dwelling house and other buildings thereupon built, and of certain closes and grounds parcel of the possessions of the said hospital, and for the annexing of divers lands and tenements of better value, being the inheritance of the said countess, unto the possessions of the said hospital for ever, in lieu of the same.
| Hoole Chapel (Lancashire) Act 1640 | 16 Cha. 1. c. 6 Pr. | 7 August 1641 |
An Act for the making of the Chapel of Hoole, in the County of Lancaster, a Parish Church, and no Part of the Parish of Croston.
| John Eggar's Free School Act 1640 | 16 Cha. 1. c. 7 Pr. | 7 August 1641 |
An Act for John Eggar's Free-school, within the Parish of Alton, in the County of Southampton.
| Settling Property on Katherine, Dowager Countess of Bedford, William, Earl of Bedford, John Russell and Edward Russell Act 1640 | 16 Cha. 1. c. 8 Pr. | 7 August 1641 |
An Act for the settling of certain Manors, Lands, Tenements, and Hereditaments, on Katherine Countess Dowager of Bedford, William now Earl of Bedford, John Russell and Edward Russell, Esquires, Sons of Francis Earl of Bedford, deceased.
| Confirmation of Letters Patent to Plymouth, etc. Act 1640 | 16 Cha. 1. c. 9 Pr. | 7 August 1641 |
An Act for the Confirmation of His Majesty's Letters Patents to the Town of Plymouth, and for dividing the Parish and building of a new Church there.
| Bishop of London's Estate Act 1640 | 16 Cha. 1. c. 10 Pr. | 7 August 1641 |
An Act for the Alteration of the Estate and Tenure of some Lands, within the Parish of Fulham, in the County of Middlesex, held of the Lord Bishop of London, as of the Manor of Fulham.
| Manor of Belgrave Act 1640 | 16 Cha. 1. c. 11 Pr. | 7 August 1641 |
An Act to settle the Manor of Belgrave, and other Lands, in the County of Leycester, to and upon William Byerly, Esquire, his Heirs and Assigns, for and towards Payment of the Debts of William Davenport, Esquire, deceased.
| Sir Alexander Denton's Estate Act 1640 | 16 Cha. 1. c. 12 Pr. | 7 August 1641 |
An Act to enable Sir Alexander Denton, Knight, to sell the Manor of Great Barvard, alias Barford Saint Michaell, and other Lands in this present Act mentioned, for the Payment of his Debts, and Preferment of his younger Children.
| Bishop of Durham's Estate Act 1640 | 16 Cha. 1. c. 13 Pr. | 10 August 1641 |
An Act for the assing of a messusage called Duresme House alias Durham House, and certain stables, part of the possessions of the bishop of Durham, situate in the parish of Saint Martin in the Fields in the county of Middlesex, unton the right honourable Philip earl of Pembroke and Mountgomerie and his heirs, and of a yearly rent of two hundred pounds per annum to the said bishop of Durham and his successors in lieu thereof.

=== Sources ===
- Raithby, John, ed. (1963) [1819]. "16° Car. I.". Statutes of the Realm. Vol. 5: The Statutes of King Charles I and King Charles II (1625–1680). London: Dawsons. pp. 55–178 – via HathiTrust.
- Raithby, John, ed. (1819). Statutes of the Realm. Vol. 5: 1628-80 – via British History Online.
- Pickering, Danby, ed. (1763). "Anno decimo sexto Caroli". The Statutes at Large. Vol. 7: From the Thirty-ninth Year of Q. Elizabeth to the Twelfth Year of K. Charles. Inclusive. Cambridge: Joseph Bentham. pp. 333–358 – via Internet Archive.
- Journal of the House of Commons. Vol. 2 – 1640-1643. His Majesty's Stationery Office. 1802 – via British History Online.
- Journal of the House of Lords. Vol. 4: 1629-1642. London: His Majesty's Stationery Office. 1830 – via British History Online.
- Chronological Table of and Index to the Statutes. Vol. 1: To the End of the Session 59 Vict. Sess. 2 (1895) (13th ed.). London: Her Majesty's Stationery Office. 1896. pp. 67–68 – via Google Books.
- Chronological Table of the Statutes: Covering the Period from 1235 to the End of 1971. London: Her Majesty's Stationery Office. 1972. pp. 65–66. ISBN 978-0-11-840096-1 – via Google Books.
- "Chronological Tables of the Private and Personal Acts: Part 2 (1603–1640)". legislation.gov.uk. The National Archives.

== See also ==
- List of acts of the Parliament of England
