= Acts of Supremacy =

16th-century English and Irish laws

The Acts of Supremacy are two acts passed by the Parliament of England in the 16th century that established the English monarchs as the head of the Church of England; two similar laws were passed by the Parliament of Ireland establishing the English monarchs as the head of the Church of Ireland. The 1534 act declared King Henry VIII and his successors as the Supreme Head of the Church, replacing the Pope. This first act was repealed during the reign of the Catholic Queen Mary I. The 1558 act declared Queen Elizabeth I and her successors the Supreme Governor of the Church, a title that the British monarch still holds.

Royal supremacy is the legal sovereignty of the king as civil law over Church of England canon law.

== First Act of Supremacy 1534 ==
Act of Supremacy 1534
- Act of Parliament
- Parliament of England
- Long title: An Act concerning the King's Highness to be Supreme Head of the Church of England, and to have Authority to reform and redress all Errors, Heresies and Abuses in the same.
- Citation: 26 Hen. 8. c. 1
- Territorial extent: England and Wales

Dates
- Royal assent: 18 December 1534
- Commencement: 3 November 1534 (Note: Start of session.)
- Repealed: 12 November 1554
Other legislation
Repealed by	See of Rome Act 1554
Relates to	Treasons Act 1534

Status: Repealed

Text of statute as originally enacted

The first Act of Supremacy, the Act of Supremacy 1534 (26 Hen. 8. c. 1), was passed on 3 November 1534 by the Parliament of England was one of the first major events in the English Reformation. It granted King Henry VIII of England and subsequent monarchs royal supremacy and stated that the reigning monarch was the supreme head of the Church of England.

The act declared that the king was "the only supreme head on Earth of the Church of England" and that the Crown shall enjoy "all honours, dignities, preeminences, jurisdictions, privileges, authorities, immunities, profits, and commodities to the said dignity." The wording of the act made clear that Parliament was not granting the king the title (thereby suggesting that they had the right to withdraw it later); rather, it was acknowledging an established fact. In the Act of Supremacy, Henry VIII withdrew support for the authority of the Pope and the Catholic Church and asserted the independence of the Ecclesia Anglicana. He appointed himself and his successors as the supreme rulers of the English church. Earlier, Henry VIII had been declared "Defender of the Faith" (Fidei defensor) in 1521 by Pope Leo X for his pamphlet accusing Martin Luther of heresy. Parliament later conferred this title upon the king in 1544.

Henry VIII was motivated to issue the act for multiple reasons. He desperately wanted a male heir to continue his line, and after wars and succession crises, aimed to ensure that his dynastic lineage would continue without challenge. When Catherine of Aragon did not bear a son, the king tried for years to annul his marriage to her, having convinced himself that God was punishing him for marrying his brother's widow.

Despite the King's close alignment with the Catholic Church and other papal annulments, Pope Clement VII refused to grant him an annulment. Catholic doctrine viewed a marriage contract as indissoluble until death, and the papacy argued that a marriage could not simply be annulled because of a canonical impediment previously dispensed. (Note: To marry Catherine originally, Henry received a special dispensation from Pope Julius II to allow the wedding.) Additionally, the emperor of the Habsburg empire at this time, Charles V, was the nephew of Catherine of Aragon, and for the Pope to declare that marriage invalid would be to separate the Church from the good favour of the emperor.

Henry VIII subsequently passed the Treasons Act 1534 (26 Hen. 8. c. 13), which stated that to disavow the Act of Supremacy and to deprive the king of his "dignity, title, or name" was to be considered treason. Thus, the king's control over the English religion was absolute and those who held to Catholic beliefs were swiftly punished. The most famous public figure to resist the Treasons Act was Thomas More, who was convicted of treason and executed by beheading.

=== Irish Act of Supremacy 1537 ===
Act of Supremacy (Ireland) 1537
- Act of Parliament
- Parliament of Ireland
- Long title: An Act authorizing the King, His Heirs, and Successors, to be supreme Head of the Church of Ireland.
- Citation: 28 Hen. 8. c. 5 (I)
- Territorial extent: Ireland

Dates
- Royal assent: 1537
- Commencement: 1537
- Repealed: 23 May 1950
Other legislation
Repealed by	Statute Law Revision Act 1950
Relates to	Act of Supremacy 1534; Act of Supremacy 1558; Act of Supremacy (Ireland) 1560

Status: Repealed

Text of statute as originally enacted

In 1537, the Act of Supremacy (Ireland) 1537 (28 Hen. 8. c. 5 (I), An Act authorising the King, His Heirs and Successors, to be supreme Head of the Church of Ireland) was passed by the Parliament of Ireland, establishing Henry VIII as the supreme head of the Church of Ireland, as had earlier been done in England.

The whole act, so far as unrepealed, was repealed for Northern Ireland by section 1(1) of, and the first schedule to, the Statute Law Revision Act 1950 (14 Geo. 6. c. 6), which came into force on 23 May 1950.

== Second Act of Supremacy 1558 ==
Act of Supremacy 1558
- Act of Parliament
- Parliament of England
- Long title: An Acte restoring to the Crowne thauncyent Jurisdiction over the State Ecclesiasticall and Spirituall, and abolyshing all Forreine Power repugnaunt to the same.
- Citation: 1 Eliz. 1. c. 1
- Territorial extent: England and Wales

Dates
- Royal assent: 8 May 1559
- Commencement: 23 January 1559
Other legislation
Repeals/revokes	Suppression of Heresy Act 1400
Amended by	Religious Disabilities Act 1846; Statute Law Revision Act 1948; Statute Law Revision Act 1950; Statute Law Revision Act 1953; Criminal Law Act 1967; Statute Law (Repeals) Act 1969
Relates to	Act of Supremacy 1534; Act of Supremacy (Ireland) 1537; Act of Supremacy (Ireland) 1560

Status: Amended

Text of statute as originally enacted

Revised text of statute as amended

Text of the Acts of Supremacy as in force today (including any amendments) within the United Kingdom, from legislation.gov.uk.

Henry VIII's Act of Supremacy was repealed in 1554 during the reign of his staunchly Catholic daughter, Queen Mary I. Upon her death in November 1558, her Protestant half-sister Elizabeth I succeeded to the throne. The first Elizabethan Parliament passed the Act of Supremacy 1558 (1 Eliz. 1. c. 1) (Note: The Act of Supremacy was passed in April 1559, so many sources refer to it by the year 1559. However, prior to 1793 all but three acts of Parliament were ex post facto laws that came into effect on the first day of the session. The first Parliament of Elizabeth I met three months earlier in January, which was still in 1558 because the next year began on 25 March 1559. Therefore, the Act of Supremacy is officially dated 1558.) that declared Elizabeth the Supreme Governor of the Church of England and instituted an Oath of Supremacy requiring anyone taking public or church office to swear allegiance to the monarch as head of the Church and state. Anyone refusing to take the oath could be charged with treason.

The use of the term Supreme Governor as opposed to Supreme Head pacified some Catholics and those Protestants concerned about a female leader of the Church of England. Elizabeth, who was a politique, did not prosecute nonconformist laymen, or those who did not follow the established rules of the Church of England unless their actions directly undermined the authority of the English monarch, as was the case in the vestments controversy. Thus, it was through the Second Act of Supremacy that Elizabeth I officially established the now reformed Church of England. This was a part of the Elizabethan Religious Settlement.

Historian G. R. Elton has argued that, "in law and political theory the Elizabethan supremacy was essentially parliamentary, while Henry VIII's had been essentially personal." The royal supremacy was extinguished during the British Interregnum from 1649, but was restored in 1660. The Stuart kings used it as a justification for controlling the appointment of bishops.

The conflation in the Crown of supreme lay authority over church and state made every secular subject of the Crown a spiritual subject of the Church as well; the Church was co-extensive with the State. Contemporary English theologian Richard Hooker described the situation thus:

There is not any man of the Church of England but the same man is a member of the Commonwealth, nor a member of the Commonwealth which is not also a member of the Church of England.

=== Irish Act of Supremacy 1560 ===
Act of Supremacy (Ireland) 1560
- Act of Parliament
- Parliament of Ireland
- Long title: An Act restoring to the Crown, the auncient Jurisdiction over the State Ecclesiasticall and Spirituall, and abolishing all forreine Power repugnant to the same.
- Citation: 2 Eliz. 1. c. 1 (I)
- Territorial extent: Ireland

Dates
- Royal assent: 1 February 1560
- Commencement: 12 February 1560
Other legislation
Amended by	Religious Disabilities Act 1846; Promissory Oaths Act 1871; Criminal Justice Act 1948; Statute Law Revision Act 1953; Criminal Law Act (Northern Ireland) 1967; Statute Law (Repeals) Act 1969; Statute Law (Repeals) Act 1973; Family Law (Miscellaneous Provisions) (Northern Ireland) Order 1984; Crime and Disorder Act 1998
Relates to	3 & 4 Phil. & Mar. c. 8 (I); Act of Supremacy 1534; Act of Supremacy (Ireland) 1537; Act of Supremacy 1558

Status: Amended

Text of statute as originally enacted

Revised text of statute as amended

Text of the Act of Supremacy (Ireland) 1560 as in force today (including any amendments) within the United Kingdom, from legislation.gov.uk.

In 1560, the Parliament of Ireland passed the Act of Supremacy (Ireland) 1560 (2 Eliz. 1. c. 1 (I)), "An Act restoring to the Crown, the auncient Jurisdiction over the State Ecclesiasticall and Spirituall, and abolishing all forreine Power repugnant to the same."

Sections 7–11 of the act were repealed by section 1 of, and part II of schedule three to, the Promissory Oaths Act 1871 (34 & 35 Vict. c. 48), which came into force on 13 July 1871.

== See also ==
- Supreme Governor of the Church of England
- State religion
- Dissolution of the Monasteries
