= Heresy Act 1382 =

Act of the Parliament of England

- Act of Parliament
- Parliament of England
- Long title: Sheriffs commissioned to apprehend preachers of heresy, and their abettors. The enormities ensuing the preaching of heresies.
- Citation: 5 Ric. 2. Stat. 2. c. 5
- Territorial extent: England and Wales; Ireland

Dates
- Royal assent: 1382
- Commencement: 7 May 1382 (Note: Start of session.)
- Repealed: 23 January 1559

Other legislation
- Amended by: Revival of the Heresy Acts
- Repealed by: England and Wales: Statute Law Revision Act 1863; Ireland: Statute Law (Ireland) Revision Act 1872
- Relates to: De heretico comburendo; Suppression of Heresy Act 1414

Status: Repealed

Text of statute as originally enacted

The Heresy Act 1382 (5 Ric. 2. Stat. 2. c. 5) was an act of the Parliament of England. The act stated that the Chancellor should issue commissions authorizing the arrest of heretical preachers, based on certificates issued by the bishops.

The act was repealed in a later Parliament of the same year as the knights of the shires claimed it had not passed the House of Commons.

== Subsequent developments ==
The act was extended to Ireland by Poynings' Law 1495 (10 Hen. 7. c. 22 (I)).

The whole act was repealed for England and Wales by section 6 of the Act of Supremacy 1558 (1 Eliz. 1. c. 1).

The whole statute, of which this chapter was a part, except chapter 4, was repealed for England and Wales by section 1 of, and the schedule to, the Statute Law Revision Act 1863 (26 & 27 Vict. c. 125), which came into force on 28 July 1863.

The whole statute, of which this chapter was a part, except chapter 4, was repealed for Ireland by section 1 of, and the schedule to, the Statute Law (Ireland) Revision Act 1872 (35 & 36 Vict. c. 98), which came into force on 10 August 1872.
