= 1st Parliament of Elizabeth I =

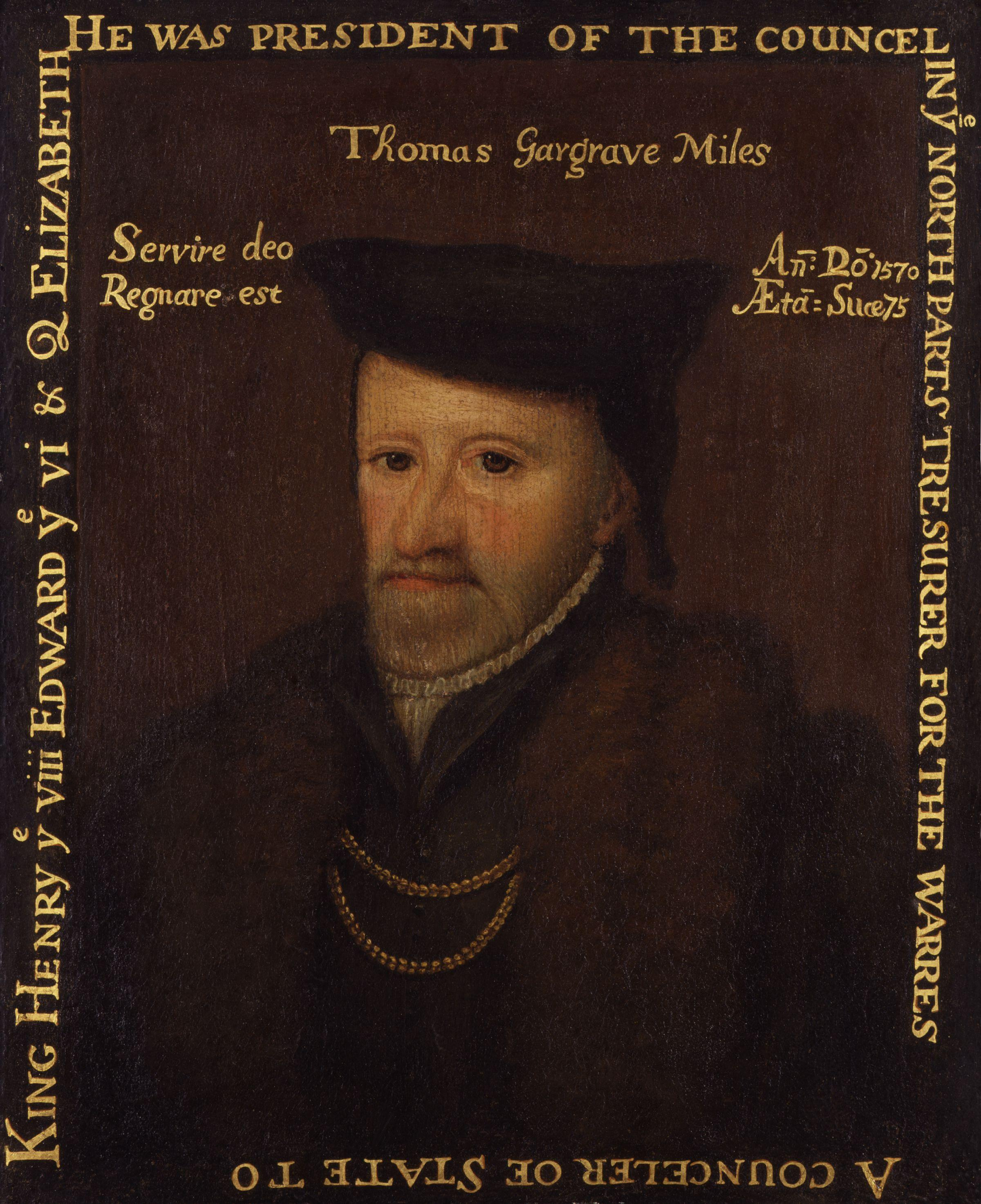
The Speaker, Sir Thomas Gargrave

The 1st Parliament of Queen Elizabeth I was summoned by Queen Elizabeth I of England on 5 December 1558 and first assembled on 23 January 1559. This Parliament would restore many of the laws created by Henry VIII and the English Reformation Parliament. Queen Elizabeth's 1st Parliament passed some 24 public statutes and seventeen private measures before being dissolved on 8 May 1559.

== Background ==
At the state opening of Parliament, the Lord Keeper of the Privy Seal Sir Nicholas Bacon informed parliament that one of the main reasons for summoning the Parliament was to establish a 'uniform order of religion'. He also drew attention to the recent loss of the Pale of Calais and the need to maintain England's navy and coastal defences. His speech summarised Elizabeth’s manifesto for the whole of her reign as to restore stability, prosperity, and peace to the country. She approved the appointment of Sir Thomas Gargrave, sitting for Yorkshire, as Speaker of the House of Commons.

The membership of the House of Commons of England then numbered 402, of whom only about a quarter had returned who had sat in the previous Parliament, in the reign of the Roman Catholic Queen Mary. However, most of the Peerage of England summoned to the House of Lords still favoured the Church of Rome. After much debate, the Commons prevailed, and two essential acts of parliament were enacted into law, the Act of Supremacy 1558 and the Act of Uniformity 1558. Collectively referred to as the Elizabethan Religious Settlement, the former confirmed the break with Rome and the latter more Protestant practices for the Church of England.

A committee was established to guarantee the Queen's financial stability. She was also petitioned to marry and to secure the succession, notwithstanding parliament's concern about a proposal of marriage from Queen Mary's widower, King Philip II of Spain, which in the event was rebuffed by Elizabeth.

== Acts ==
The major pieces of legislation from the first Parliament of Elizabeth included:

=== Act of Supremacy 1558 ===
This act gave full ecclesiastical authority to the monarchy and abolished the authority of the Pope in England. This act restored a law previously enacted by Henry VIII's English Reformation Parliament in 1534, partially repealed by Mary I in 1555.

=== Act of Uniformity 1558 ===
This re-introduced the English Book of Common Prayer, but with the order of prayer amended to make the Reformed book more acceptable to traditional Catholic worshippers and clergy. It also established that all English subjects were required to attend Church at least once a week, or suffer a fine.

=== Treason Act 1558 ===
This declared that directly saying, publishing, declaring, or holding the opinion that the Queen or her heirs were not the rightful monarch of England was an act of Treason. All persons so convicted would lose their property to the Crown and could be imprisoned for the rest of their lives.

=== First Fruits and Tenths Act 1558 ===
This Act restored the “First and Tenths”, a tax on the clergy of England. The clergy would pay a portion of their first year’s earnings, and thereafter pay a tenth of their revenue once per year. This tax had originally been established by Henry VIII to claim money intended for the papacy.

== See also ==
- Acts of the 1st Parliament.
- List of parliaments of England
- English Reformation Parliament
