= Abolition of High Commission Court Act 1640 =

Act of the Parliament of England

- Act of Parliament
- Parliament of England
- Long title: An Act for repeal of a branch of a Statute primo Elizabethe concerning Commissioners for causes Ecclesiasticall.
- Citation: 16 Cha. 1. c. 11
- Territorial extent: England and Wales

Dates
- Royal assent: 5 July 1641
- Commencement: 3 November 1640 (Note: Start of session.)
- Repealed: 1 March 1965
Other legislation
Amends	Act of Supremacy 1558
Amended by	Ecclesiastical Jurisdiction Act 1661; Statute Law Revision Act 1887
Repealed by	Ecclesiastical Jurisdiction Measure 1963

Status: Repealed

Text of statute as originally enacted

The Abolition of High Commission Court Act 1640 (16 Cha. 1. c. 11), sometimes referred to as the Ecclesiastical Causes Act 1640, the Abolition of High Commission Court Act 1640, the High Commission Abolition Act 1641, the Abolition of the Court of High Commission Act, the High Commission Court Abolition Act, the Act for the Abolition of the High Commission, the Act for the Abolition of the High Commission Court, or the Act for the Abolition of the Court of High Commission, was an act of the Parliament of England, passed by the Long Parliament. It abolished the Court of High Commission and repealed the clause in the Act of Supremacy 1558 (1 Eliz. 1. c. 1) that gave the Court legal authority. Horder said the act 16 Cha. 1. c. 11 is "important". It is a precursor to the Self-Incrimination Clause which is included in the Fifth Amendment to the United States Constitution.

== Subsequent developments ==
The whole act, except what concerned the High Commission court or the new erection of some such like court by commission, was repealed by section 2 of the Ecclesiastical Jurisdiction Act 1661 (13 Cha. 2. St. 1. c. 12). The effect of this amendment was to repeal sections 2 and 3 of the Act 16 Cha. 1. c. 11.

The preamble and section 1 were repealed by section 1 of, and the schedule to, the Statute Law Revision Act 1887 (50 & 51 Vict. c. 59), which came into force on 16 September 1887.

The words of commencement in section 4 of the act were repealed by section 1 of, and the first schedule to, the Statute Law Revision Act 1948 (11 & 12 Geo. 6. c. 62), which came into force on 30 July 1948.

The whole act was repealed by section 87 of, and the fifth schedule to, the Ecclesiastical Jurisdiction Measure 1963 (No. 1), which came into force on 1 March 1965.

== Provisions ==
=== Section 4 ===
This is section 5 in Pickering's edition and in Ruffhead's edition reprinted in 1770.

This section was annexed to the original act in a separate schedule.

== Bibliography ==
- "16 Car 1 C 11 (1650)". Halsbury's Statutes of England. 2nd Ed. Butterworth & Co (Publishers) Ltd. 1948. vol 5. p 156.
- "Stat (1640) 16 Car 1 c 11". Halsbury's Statutes of England. (The Complete Statutes of England). Butterworth & Co (Publishers) Ltd. 1929. vol 4: . p 8. See also vol 6 at pp 53, 174 & 175.
- Stephens. "XX. Stat 16 Caroli c 11 AD 1640". The Statutes relating to the Ecclesiastical and Eleemosynary Institutions of England, Wales, Ireland, India, and the Colonies. John W Parker. 1845. Volume 1. Pages 554 to 560.
- Gibson. Codex Juris Ecclesiastici Anglicani. 1761. vol 1. pp 49 & 50.
- Wade, Phillips and Bradley. Constitutional and Administrative Law. 9th Ed. Longman. 1977. p 456.
- Phillips and Jackson. O Hood Phillips' Constitutional and Administrative Law. 7th Ed. Sweet & Maxwell. 1987. p 294.
