= Supreme Head of the Church of England =

1536–1555 office in the Kingdom of England

- Flag of England and the Church of England

- Longest in office Henry VIII; 1531–1547
- Church of England
- Style: Majesty
- Residence: Palace of Whitehall
- Constituting instrument: Act of Supremacy of 1534
- Precursor: The Pope (as head of the Roman Catholic Church)
- Formation: 1531
- First holder: Henry VIII
- Final holder: Mary I
- Abolished: 1555
- Succession: Supreme Governor of the Church of England

The title of Supreme Head of the Church of England was created in 1531 for King Henry VIII when he first began to separate the Church of England from the authority of the Holy See and allegiance to the papacy, then represented by Pope Clement VII. The Act of Supremacy of 1534 confirmed the King's status as having supremacy over the church and required the nobility to swear an oath recognising Henry's supremacy. By 1536, Henry had broken with Rome, seized assets of the Catholic Church in England and Wales and declared the Church of England as the established church with himself as its head. Pope Paul III excommunicated Henry in 1538 over his divorce from Catherine of Aragon.

Similarly, in Ireland, the Parliament of Ireland passed the Act of Supremacy (Ireland) 1537, establishing Henry as Supreme Head of the Church of Ireland. Again Henry seized assets of the Catholic Church in Ireland and declared the Church of Ireland as the established church with himself as its head. He made himself King of Ireland in 1541, which reinforced his status (previous English kings had held the title of Lord of Ireland, and the island was considered a papal fief based on an 1155 papal bull).

Henry's daughter, Queen Mary I, a staunch Catholic, attempted to restore the English and Irish churches' allegiance to the Pope and repealed the Act of Supremacy in 1555. Her half-sister, Elizabeth I, took the throne in 1558 and the English Parliament passed the Act of Supremacy of 1558 that restored the original act; the Irish Parliament passed the similar Act of Supremacy (Ireland) 1560. The new Oath of Supremacy that nobles were required to swear gave the Queen's title as supreme governor of the church rather than supreme head, to avoid the charge that the monarchy was claiming divinity or usurping Christ, whom the Bible explicitly identifies as Head of the Church.

== List of supreme heads ==
Name	Years	Notes
Henry VIII	1531–1547	
Edward VI	1547–1553	With Thomas Cranmer, authorised the Book of Common Prayer.
Lady Jane Grey	1553	Reign's legitimacy is disputed.
Mary I and Philip	1553–1555	From 1554 the couple omitted the title, without statutory authority until authorised by Parliament in 1555. Promoted the Counter-Reformation in England, Wales and Ireland.
