= Act for the Repeal of several Clauses in Statutes imposing Penalties for not coming to Church =

The Act for the Repeal of several Clauses in Statutes imposing Penalties for not coming to Church was passed on 27 September 1650 by the Rump Parliament of the Commonwealth of England. It repealed the Act of Supremacy, Act of Uniformity, and all laws making recusancy a crime. There was no longer a legal requirement to attend the parish church on Sundays (for both Protestants and Catholics).

This act was rendered null and void after the Restoration of the monarchy in 1660 as part of a general re-establishment of the Anglican church.
