= Brawling Act 1553 =

Act of the Parliament of England

Brawling Act 1553 (Note: The citation of this act by this short title was authorised by section 5 of, and the second schedule to, the Statute Law Revision Act 1948. Due to the repeal of those provisions, it is now authorised by section 19(2) of the Interpretation Act 1978.)
- Act of Parliament
- Parliament of England
- Long title: An Acte against Offenders of Preachers and other Ministers in the Churche. (Note: These words are printed against this act in the second column of the second schedule to the Statute Law Revision Act 1948, which is headed "Title".)
- Citation: 1 Mar. Sess. 2. c. 3
- Territorial extent: England and Wales

Dates
- Royal assent: 5 December 1553
- Commencement: 21 December 1553 (Note: Section 1.)
- Repealed: 1 January 1968
Other legislation
Amended by	Ecclesiastical Courts Jurisdiction Act 1860; Statute Law Revision Act 1888; Ecclesiastical Jurisdiction Measure 1963
Repealed by	Criminal Law Act 1967
Relates to	Brawling Act 1551

Status: Repealed

Text of statute as originally enacted

The Brawling Act 1553 (1 Mar. Sess. 2. c. 3) was an act of the Parliament of England.

== Subsequent developments ==
Section 6 of the Ecclesiastical Courts Jurisdiction Act 1860 (23 & 24 Vict. c. 32) provided that nothing contained in that act was to be taken to repeal or alter this act.

Sections 5 or 6 of the act were repealed by section 87 of, and the fifth schedule to, the Ecclesiastical Jurisdiction Measure 1963 (No. 1), which came into force on 1 March 1965.

The whole act was repealed by section 13(2) of, and part I of schedule 4 to, the Criminal Law Act 1967.

== See also ==
- Brawling (legal definition)
- Halsbury's Statutes
