= Circumspecte Agatis =

Statute issued in 1285

Statute of Circumspecte Agatis
- Act of Parliament
- Parliament of England
- Long title: Statutū Circumspecte Agatis
- Citation: 13 Edw. 1.
- Territorial extent: England and Wales; Ireland

Dates
- Royal assent: 1285
- Commencement: 1285
- Repealed: 1 March 1965

Other legislation
- Repealed by: Ecclesiastical Jurisdiction Measure 1963

Status: Repealed

Text of statute as originally enacted

The statute of Circumspecte agatis (Latin: Statutū Circumspecte Agatis), or Circumspecte Agatis, was an English statute issued in 1285 by King Edward I. It defines the jurisdictions of Church and State, forcing church courts to confine themselves to ecclesiastical cases. This, along with the Articuli Cleri of Edward II, the Act of the 18th of Edward III (1344) and the Charter of Edward IV (1462), eventually settled this long-standing dispute.

The original statute issued by Edward I was a response to a dispute involving the bishop of Norwich. The instructions to the king's judges were to:

...use yourselves circumspectly in all matters concerning the Bishop of Norwich and his Clergy, not punishing them if they hold Plea in Court Christian, of such things as be meer spiritual, that is to wit, of Penance, enjoined by Prelates for deadly Sin, as Fornication, Adultery, and such like.

== Subsequent developments ==
The whole statute was repealed by section 87 of, and the fifth schedule to, the Ecclesiastical Jurisdiction Measure 1963, which came into force on 1 March 1965.

== See also ==
- Benefit of clergy.
