= Writ De Excommunicato Capiendo Act 1562 =

Act of the Parliament of England

Writ De Excommunicato Capiendo Act 1562 (Note: The citation of this act by this short title was authorised by section 5 of, and the second schedule to, the Statute Law Revision Act 1948. Due to the repeal of those provisions, it is now authorised by section 19(2) of the Interpretation Act 1978.)
- Act of Parliament
- Parliament of England
- Long title: An Acte for the due Execucion of the Writ De Excommunicato capiendo. (Note: These words are printed against this act in the second column of the second schedule to the Statute Law Revision Act 1948, which is headed "Title".)
- Citation: 5 Eliz. 1. c. 23
- Territorial extent: England and Wales

Dates
- Royal assent: 10 April 1563
- Commencement: 1 May 1563 (Note: Section 1.)
- Repealed: 1 March 1965
Other legislation
Amended by	Sheriffs Act 1887; Statute Law revision Act 1888
Repealed by	Ecclesiastical Jurisdiction Measure 1963

Status: Repealed

Text of statute as originally enacted

The Writ De Excommunicato Capiendo Act 1562 (5 Eliz. 1. c. 23) was an act of the Parliament of England.

== Writ ==
A writ de excommunicato capiendo (Latin for "taking one who is excommunicated") was a writ commanding the sheriff to arrest one who was excommunicated, and imprison him till he should become reconciled to the church.

== Subsequent developments ==
The whole act was repealed by section 87 of, and the fifth schedule to, the Ecclesiastical Jurisdiction Measure 1963 (No. 1), which came into force on 1 March 1965.

== See also ==
- De Excommunicato Deliberando
