= Brawling (legal definition) =

Brawling (probably connected with German language brüllen, to roar, shout), in law, was the offence of quarrelling, or creating a disturbance in a church or churchyard. Brawling was covered in ecclesiastic courts until 1860. It has rarely been prosecuted since then.

== History ==
During the early stages of the Reformation in England, religious controversy too often became converted into actual disturbance, and the ritual lawlessness of the parochial clergy very frequently provoked popular violence. To repress these disturbances, the Brawling Act 1551 (5 & 6 Edw. 6. c. 4) was passed, by which it was enacted: "that if any person shall, by words only, quarrel, chide or brawl in any church or churchyard, it shall be lawful for the ordinary of the place where the same shall be done and proved by two lawful witnesses, to suspend any person so offending, if he be a layman, from the entrance of the church, and if he be a clerk, from the ministration of his office, for so long as the said ordinary shall think meet, according to the fault."

The Brawling Act 1553 (1 Mar. Sess. 2. c. 3) added the punishment of imprisonment until the party should repent. The Brawling Act 1551 was partly repealed in 1828 and wholly repealed as regards laymen by the Ecclesiastical Courts Jurisdiction Act 1860. Under that Act, which applies to Ireland as well as to England, persons guilty of riotous, violent or indecent behaviour, in churches and chapels of the Church of England or Ireland, or in any chapel of any religious denomination, or in England in any place of religious worship duly certified, or in churchyards or burial-grounds, were liable on conviction before two justices to a penalty of not more than £5, or imprisonment for any term not exceeding two months. This enactment applied to clergy as well as to laity, and a clergyman of the Church of England convicted under it could also be dealt with under the Clergy Discipline Act 1892 (Girt v. Fillingham, 1901, L.R. Prob. 176).

When Mr J. Kensit during an ordination service in St Paul's Cathedral "objected" to one of the candidates for ordination, on grounds which did not constitute an impediment or notable crime within the meaning of the ordination service, he was held to have unlawfully disturbed the Bishop of London in the conduct of the service, and to be liable to conviction under the Ecclesiastical Courts Jurisdiction Act 1860 (Kensit v. Dean and Chapter of St Paul's, 1905, L.R. 2 K.B. 249). The public worship of Protestant Dissenters, Roman Catholics and Jews in England had before 1860 been protected by a series of statutes beginning with the Toleration Act 1688, and ending with the Liberty of Religious Worship Act 1855. These enactments, though not repealed, were for practical purposes superseded by the summary remedy given by the Ecclesiastical Courts Jurisdiction Act 1860. In Scotland disturbance of public worship is punishable as a breach of the peace (Dougall v. Dykes, 1861, 4 Irvine 101).

=== In the British Empire ===
In British possessions, interference with religious worship was usually dealt with by legislation, and not as a common-law offence. In India it was an offence voluntarily to cause disturbance to any assembly lawfully engaged in the performance of religious worship or religious ceremonies (Penal Code, s. 296). Under the Queensland Criminal Code of 1899 (s. 207) penalties were imposed on persons who wilfully and without lawful justification or excuse (the proof of which lies on them) disquiet or disturb any meeting of persons lawfully assembled for religious worship, or assault any forces lawfully officiating at such meeting, or any of the persons there assembled.

=== In the United States ===
In the United States disturbance of religious worship is treated as an offense under the common law, which is in many states supplemented by legislation (see Bishop, Amer. Crim. Law, 8th ed. 1892, vol. i. s. 542, vol. ii. ss. 303-305; California Penal Code, s. 302; Revised Laws of Massachusetts, 1902, chap. 212, s. 30.). -- (Dissenting correction to the above)

== Modern case ==
In 1998, Peter Tatchell of OutRage! was prosecuted for interrupting the Archbishop of Canterbury's Easter sermon with a short gay rights speech. The 1860 legislation (which transferred jurisdiction away from the ecclesiastic courts) was used to try him; his defense focused on the Human Rights Act 1998. He was convicted and fined £18.60 (referring to the 1860 legislation) plus court costs.

== See also ==
- Brawling Act 1551
- Brawling Act 1553
