= Commonwealth of England =

Period of republican government, 1649–1660

- 1649–1660
Second English Civil War	Stuart Restoration (1660)
- The last flag of the Commonwealth, used from 1658 until the 1660 Stuart Restoration.
- Including: Third English Civil War; Interregnum (1649–1660); The Protectorate (1653–1659)
- Lord Protector: Oliver Cromwell (1653–1658); Richard Cromwell (1658–1659)

The Commonwealth of England, enlarged in 1653 as the Commonwealth of England, Scotland and Ireland, was the political structure during the period from 1649 to 1660 when the Kingdom of England was dissolved into a republic after the end of the Second English Civil War and the trial and execution of Charles I. The republic's existence was declared through "An Act declaring England to be a Commonwealth", adopted by the Rump Parliament on 19 May 1649. Power in the early Commonwealth was vested primarily in the Parliament and a Council of State. During the period, fighting continued, particularly in Ireland and Scotland, between the parliamentary forces and those opposed to them, in the Cromwellian conquest of Ireland and the Anglo-Scottish war of 1650–1652.

In 1653, after dissolution of the Rump Parliament, the Army Council adopted the Instrument of Government, by which Oliver Cromwell was made Lord Protector of a united "Commonwealth of England, Scotland and Ireland", inaugurating the period now usually known as the Protectorate. After Cromwell's death, and following a brief period of rule under his son, Richard Cromwell, the Protectorate Parliament was dissolved in 1659 and the Rump Parliament recalled, starting a process that led to the restoration of the monarchy in 1660. The term Commonwealth is sometimes used for the whole of 1649 to 1660 – called by some the Interregnum – although for other historians, the use of the term is limited to the years prior to Cromwell's formal assumption of power in 1653.

In retrospect, the period of republican rule for England was a failure in the short term. During the 11-year period, no stable government was established to rule the English state for longer than a few months at a time. Several administrative structures were tried, and several Parliaments called and seated, but little in the way of meaningful, lasting legislation was passed. The only force keeping it together was the personality of Oliver Cromwell, who exerted control through the military by way of the "Grandees", being the Major-Generals and other senior military leaders of the New Model Army. Not only did Cromwell's regime crumble into near anarchy upon his death and the brief administration of his son, but the monarchy he had overthrown was restored in 1660, and its first act was officially to erase all traces of any constitutional reforms of the Republican period. Still, the memory of the Parliamentarian cause, dubbed the Good Old Cause by the soldiers of the New Model Army, lingered on.

The Commonwealth period is better remembered for the military success of Thomas Fairfax, Oliver Cromwell, and the New Model Army. Besides resounding victories in the English Civil War, the reformed Navy under the command of Robert Blake defeated the Dutch in the First Anglo-Dutch War, which marked the first step towards England's naval supremacy. In Ireland, the Commonwealth period is remembered for Cromwell's conquest of Ireland, which continued and completed the policies of the Tudor and Stuart periods.

== History ==
=== 1649–1653 ===
==== Rump Parliament ====
The Rump was created by Pride's Purge of those members of the Long Parliament who did not support the political position of the Grandees in the New Model Army. Just before and after the execution of King Charles I on 30 January 1649, the Rump passed a number of acts of Parliament creating the legal basis for the republic. With the abolition of the monarchy, Privy Council and the House of Lords, it had unchecked executive and legislative power.

The English Council of State, which replaced the Privy Council, took over many of the executive functions of the monarchy. It was selected by the Rump, and most of its members were MPs. The Rump depended on the support of the Army with which it had a very uneasy relationship. After the execution of Charles I, the House of Commons abolished the monarchy and the House of Lords. It declared the people of England "and of all the Dominions and Territories thereunto belonging" to be henceforth under the governance of a "Commonwealth", effectively a republic.

===== Structure =====
In Pride's Purge, all members of parliament, including most of the political Presbyterians, who would not accept the need to bring the King to trial had been removed. Thus the Rump never had more than two hundred members, less than half the number of the Commons in the original Long Parliament. They included: supporters of religious independents who did not want an established church and some of whom had sympathies with the Levellers; Presbyterians who were willing to countenance the trial and execution of the King; and later admissions, such as formerly excluded MPs who were prepared to denounce the Newport Treaty negotiations with the King.

Most members of the Rump were gentry, though there was a higher proportion of lesser gentry and lawyers than in previous parliaments. Less than one-quarter were regicides. This left the Rump as basically a conservative body whose vested interests in the existing land ownership and legal systems made it unlikely to want to reform them.

===== Issues and achievements =====
Act Declaring and Constituting the People of England to be a Commonwealth and Free-State, enacted on 19 May 1649

For the first two years of the Commonwealth, the Rump faced economic depression and the risk of invasion from Scotland and Ireland. By 1653 Cromwell and the Army had largely eliminated these threats.

There were many disagreements amongst factions of the Rump. Some wanted a republic, but others favoured retaining some type of monarchical government. Most of England's traditional ruling classes regarded the Rump as an illegal government made up of regicides and upstarts. However, they were also aware that the Rump might be all that stood in the way of an outright military dictatorship. High taxes, mainly to pay the Army, were resented by the gentry. Limited reforms were enough to antagonise the ruling class but not enough to satisfy the radicals.

Despite its unpopularity, the Rump was a link with the old constitution and helped to settle England down and make it secure after the biggest upheaval in its history. By 1653, France and Spain had recognised England's new government.

===== Reforms =====
Though the Church of England was retained, episcopacy was suppressed and the Act of Uniformity 1558 was repealed in September 1650. Mainly on the insistence of the Army, many independent churches were tolerated, although everyone still had to pay tithes to the established church.

Some small improvements were made to law and court procedure. For example, all court proceedings were now conducted in English rather than in Law French or Latin. However, there were no widespread reforms of the common law. This would have upset the gentry, who regarded the common law as reinforcing their status and property rights.

The Rump passed many restrictive laws to regulate people's moral behaviour, such as closing down theatres and requiring strict observance of Sunday. Laws were also passed banning the celebration of Easter and Christmas. This antagonised most of the gentry.

===== Dismissal =====
Cromwell, aided by Thomas Harrison, forcibly dismissed the Rump on 20 April 1653, for reasons that are unclear. Theories are that he feared the Rump was trying to perpetuate itself as the government, or that the Rump was preparing for an election which could return an anti-Commonwealth majority. Many former members of the Rump continued to regard themselves as England's only legitimate constitutional authority. The Rump had not agreed to its own dissolution. Their legal, constitutional view that it was unlawful was based on Charles' concessionary Act prohibiting the dissolution of Parliament without its own consent, on 11 May 1641, leading to the entire Commonwealth being the latter years of the Long Parliament in their majority view.

==== Barebone's Parliament, July–December 1653 ====
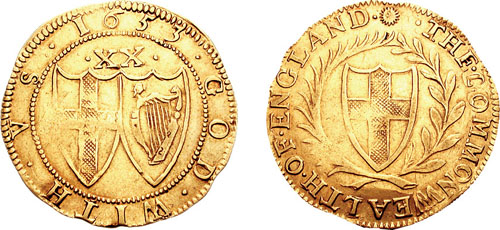
A gold Unite from 1653

The dissolution of the Rump was followed by a short period in which Cromwell and the Army ruled alone. Nobody had the constitutional authority to call an election, but Cromwell did not want to impose a military dictatorship. Instead, he ruled through a "nominated assembly" which he believed would be easy for the Army to control since Army officers did the nominating.

Barebone's Parliament was opposed by former Rumpers and ridiculed by many gentries as being an assembly of inferior people. Over 110 of its 140 members were lesser gentry or of higher social status. An exception was Praise-God Barebone, a Baptist merchant after whom the Assembly got its derogatory nickname. Many were well educated.

The assembly reflected the range of views of the officers who nominated it. The Radicals (approximately 40) included a hard core of Fifth Monarchists who wanted to be rid of Common Law and any state control of religion. The Moderates (approximately 60) wanted some improvements within the existing system and might move to either the radical or conservative side depending on the issue. The Conservatives (approximately 40) wanted to keep the status quo, since common law protected the interests of the gentry, and tithes and advowsons were valuable property.

Cromwell saw Barebone's Parliament as a temporary legislative body which he hoped would produce reforms and develop a constitution for the Commonwealth. Members were divided over key issues, only 25 had previous parliamentary experience, and although many had some legal training, there were no qualified lawyers.

Cromwell seems to have expected this group of amateurs to produce reform without management or direction. When the radicals mustered enough support to defeat a bill which would have preserved the status quo in religion, the conservatives, together with many moderates, surrendered their authority back to Cromwell, who sent soldiers to clear the rest of the Assembly. Barebone's Parliament was over.

=== Protectorate, 1653–1659 ===
The arms of Oliver Cromwell as Lord Protector, used on the great seal from 1655 to 1659.

Throughout 1653, Cromwell and the Army slowly dismantled the machinery of the Commonwealth state. The English Council of State, which had assumed the executive function formerly held by the King and his Privy Council, was forcibly dissolved by Cromwell on 20 April, and in its place a new council, filled with Cromwell's own chosen men, was installed. Three days after Barebone's Parliament dissolved itself, the Instrument of Government was adopted by Cromwell's council and a new state structure, now known historically as The Protectorate, was given its shape. This new constitution granted Cromwell sweeping powers as Lord Protector, an office which ironically had much the same role and powers as the King had under the monarchy, a fact not lost on Cromwell's critics.

On 12 April 1654, under the terms of the Tender of Union, the Ordinance for uniting Scotland into one Commonwealth with England was issued by the Lord Protector and proclaimed in Scotland by the military governor of Scotland, General George Monck, 1st Duke of Albemarle. The ordinance declared that "the people of Scotland should be united with the people of England into one Commonwealth and under one Government" and decreed that a new "Arms of the Commonwealth", incorporating the Saltire, should be placed on "all the public seals, seals of office, and seals of bodies civil or corporate, in Scotland" as "a badge of this Union".

==== First Protectorate Parliament ====
Cromwell and his Council of State spent the first several months of 1654 preparing for the First Protectorate Parliament by drawing up a set of 84 bills for consideration. The Parliament was freely elected (as free as such elections could be in the 17th century) and as such, the Parliament was filled with a wide range of political interests, and as such did not accomplish any of its goals. Having passed none of Cromwell's proposed bills, he dissolved it as soon as law would allow.

==== Rule of the Major-Generals and Second Protectorate Parliament ====
Having decided that Parliament was not an efficient means of getting his policies enacted, Cromwell instituted a system of direct military rule of England during a period known as the Rule of the Major-Generals. All of England was divided into ten regions, and each was governed directly by one of Cromwell's Major-Generals, who were given sweeping powers to collect taxes and enforce the peace. The Major-Generals were highly unpopular, a fact that they themselves noticed, and many urged Cromwell to call another Parliament to give his rule legitimacy.

Unlike the prior Parliament, which had been open to all eligible males in the Commonwealth, the new elections specifically excluded Catholics and Royalists from running or voting. As a result, it was stocked with members who were more in line with Cromwell's own politics. The first major bill to be brought up for debate was the Militia Bill, which was ultimately voted down by the House. As a result, the authority of the Major-Generals to collect taxes to support their own regimes ended, and the Rule of the Major Generals came to an end.

The second piece of major legislation was the passage of the Humble Petition and Advice, a sweeping constitutional reform which had two purposes. The first was to reserve for Parliament certain rights, such as a three-year fixed-term, which the Lord Protector was required to abide by, and to reserve for the Parliament the sole right of taxation. The second, as a concession to Cromwell, was to make the Lord Protector a hereditary position and to convert the title to a formal constitutional Kingship. Cromwell refused the title of King, but accepted the rest of the legislation, which was passed in final form on 25 May 1657.

A second session of the Parliament met in 1658. It allowed previously excluded MPs, who had been not allowed to take their seats because of Catholic and/or Royalist leanings, to take their seats. This made the Parliament far less compliant to the wishes of Cromwell and the Major-Generals. It accomplished little in the way of a legislative agenda and was dissolved after a few months.

==== Richard Cromwell and the Third Protectorate Parliament ====
On the death of Oliver Cromwell in 1658, his son, Richard Cromwell, inherited the title, Lord Protector. Richard had never served in the Army, which meant he lost control over the Major-Generals that had been the source of his own father's power. The Third Protectorate Parliament was summoned in late 1658 and was seated on 27 January 1659. Its first act was to confirm Richard's role as Lord Protector, which it did by a sizeable, but not overwhelming, majority.

Quickly it became apparent that Richard had no control over the Army and divisions quickly developed in the Parliament. One faction called for a recall of the Rump Parliament and a return to the constitution of the Commonwealth, while another preferred the existing constitution. As the parties grew increasingly quarrelsome, Richard dissolved it. He was quickly removed from power. The remaining Army leadership recalled the Rump Parliament, setting the stage for the return of the Monarchy a year later.

=== 1659–1660 ===
After the Grandees in the New Model Army removed Richard, they reinstalled the Rump Parliament in May 1659. Charles Fleetwood was appointed a member of the Committee of Safety and of the Council of State, and one of the seven commissioners for the army. On 9 June he was nominated lord-general (commander-in-chief) of the army. His power was undermined in parliament, which chose to disregard the army's authority in a similar fashion to the pre–Civil War parliament.

On 12 October 1659 the Commons cashiered General John Lambert and other officers, and installed Fleetwood as chief of a military council under the authority of the Speaker. The next day Lambert ordered that the doors of the House be shut and the members kept out.

On 26 October a "Committee of Safety" was appointed, of which Fleetwood and Lambert were members. Lambert was appointed major-general of all the forces in England and Scotland, Fleetwood being general. Lambert was now sent, by the Committee of Safety, with a large force to meet George Monck, who was in command of the English forces in Scotland, and either negotiate with him or force him to come to terms.

It was into this atmosphere that General George Monck marched south with his army from Scotland. Lambert's army began to desert him, and he returned to London almost alone. On 21 February 1660, Monck reinstated the Presbyterian members of the Long Parliament "secluded" by Pride, so that they could prepare legislation for a new parliament. Fleetwood was deprived of his command and ordered to appear before parliament to answer for his conduct.

On 3 March, Lambert was sent to the Tower, from which he escaped a month later. Lambert tried to rekindle the civil war in favour of the Commonwealth by issuing a proclamation calling on all supporters of the "Good Old Cause" to rally on the battlefield of Edgehill. He was recaptured by Colonel Richard Ingoldsby, a regicide who hoped to win a pardon by handing Lambert over to the new regime. The Long Parliament dissolved itself on 16 March.

On 4 April 1660, in response to a secret message sent by Monck, Charles II issued the Declaration of Breda, which made known the conditions of his acceptance of the crown of England. Monck organised the Convention Parliament, which met for the first time on 25 April. On 8 May it proclaimed that King Charles II had been the lawful monarch since the execution of Charles I in January 1649. Charles returned from exile on 23 May. He entered London on 29 May, his birthday. To celebrate "his Majesty's Return to his Parliament" 29 May was made a public holiday, popularly known as Oak Apple Day. He was crowned at Westminster Abbey on 23 April 1661.

== See also ==
- Anglo-Spanish War (1654–1660)
- Flags of the English Interregnum
- List of ordinances and acts of the Parliament of England, 1642–1660
- Knights, baronets and peers of the Protectorate
- Republicanism in the United Kingdom

== Notes ==
Preceded by Charles I in England & Ireland	Commonwealth of England; 1649–1653	Succeeded by Oliver Cromwell; The Protectorate 1653–1658
Preceded by The Covenanters in Scotland	Commonwealth of England; 1649–1653	Succeeded by Oliver Cromwell; The Protectorate 1653–1658
Preceded by Richard Cromwell; The Protectorate 1658–1659	Commonwealth of England; 1659–1660	Succeeded by Charles II; Stuart Restoration
