= Pacification, England and Scotland Act 1640 =

Act of the Parliament of England

- Act of Parliament
- Parliament of England
- Long title: An Act for the Pacification between England and Scotland.
- Citation: 16 Cha. 1. c. 17
- Territorial extent: England and Wales

Dates
- Royal assent: 10 August 1641
- Commencement: 3 November 1640 (Note: Start of session.)
- Repealed: 28 July 1863
Other legislation
Repealed by	Statute Law Revision Act 1863

Status: Repealed

Text of statute as originally enacted

The Pacification, England and Scotland Act 1640 (16 Cha. 1. c. 17) was an act of the Parliament of England passed by the Long Parliament. Its full title was "An Act for the Pacification between England and Scotland".

The act declared that those who resumed fighting "ought to be punished as breakers of the peace" and that amnesty "shall not...extend to...theeves, robbers, murtherers, broaken-men [and] outlawers".

== Subsequent developments ==
The whole act was repealed by section 1 of, and the schedule to, the Statute Law Revision Act 1863 (26 & 27 Vict. c. 125), which came into force on 28 July 1863.
