= Mortuaries Act 1529 =

Act of the Parliament of England

The Mortuaries Act 1529 (Note: The citation of this act by this short title was authorised by section 5 of, and the second schedule to, the Statute Law Revision Act 1948. Due to the repeal of those provisions, it is now authorised by section 19(2) of the Interpretation Act 1978.)
- Act of Parliament
- Parliament of England
- Long title: An Acte concerninge the takinge of Mortuaries or demaundinge receivinge or clayminge of the same. (Note: These words are printed against this act in the second column of the second schedule to the Statute Law Revision Act 1948, which is headed "Title".)
- Citation: 21 Hen. 8. c. 6
- Territorial extent: England and Wales

Dates
- Royal assent: 17 December 1529
- Commencement: 1 April 1530 (Note: Section 1.)
- Repealed: 1 March 1965
Other legislation
Amended by	Statute Law Revision Act 1888; Statute Law Revision Act 1948
Repealed by	Ecclesiastical Jurisdiction Measure 1963

Status: Repealed

Text of statute as originally enacted

The Mortuaries Act 1529 (21 Hen. 8. c. 6), sometimes called the Statute of Mortuaries was an act of the Parliament of England. It was one of the "anti-clerical" acts meant to reduce the power of the clergy, passed along with the Probate Act to limit the fees that the clerical courts could collect.

Such fees had been the source of dispute, for example, in Hunne's Case. In connection with that case it was suggested the clergy had murdered a father who was accused of heresy after he lost a court case over unpaid mortuary fees for his deceased child.

The act put limits on the amount of mortuary fees based on the amount of assets of the deceased, abolished fees for married women and children, and called for payment of fees for deceased travellers in the place of their usual habitation.

== Section 1 ==
In this section, the words of commencement and the words "of det by writ byll plaint" were repealed by section 1 of, and schedule 1 to, the Statute Law Revision Act 1948 (11 & 12 Geo. 6. c. 62).

The whole act was repealed by section 87 of, and the fifth schedule to, the Ecclesiastical Jurisdiction Measure 1963 (No. 1), which came into force on 1 March 1965.
