= Revival of the Heresy Acts =

Act of the Parliament of England

Heresy Revival Act 1554
- Act of Parliament
- Parliament of England
- Long title: An Act for the reviving of Three Statutes, made for the Punishment of Heresy.
- Citation: 1 & 2 Ph. & M. c. 6
- Territorial extent: England and Wales

Dates
- Royal assent: 16 January 1555
- Commencement: 12 November 1554 (Note: Start of session.)
- Repealed: 23 January 1559
Other legislation
Amends	Heresy Act 1382; De heretico comburendo; Suppression of Heresy Act 1414
Repealed by	Act of Supremacy 1558

Status: Repealed

Text of statute as originally enacted

In November 1554, the Revival of the Heresy Acts (1 & 2 Ph. & M. c. 6) revived three former acts against heresy; the Heresy Act 1382 (5 Ric. 2. Stat. 2. c. 5) of King Richard II, Suppression of Heresy Act 1401 (2 Hen. 4. c. 15) of King Henry IV, and the Suppression of Heresy Act 1414 (2 Hen. 5. Stat. 1. c. 7) of King Henry V. All three of these laws had been repealed under King Henry VIII and King Edward VI.

This act reflects Queen Mary I's concern for increased heresy and the lack of authority to deal with it. Edward and his father had sponsored the Reformation in stages, but Mary had always been Roman Catholic and considered Protestants to be heretics, and needed this law to pursue her religious policies.

The act stated its purpose:

For the eschewing and avoiding of errors and heresies, which of late have risen, grown, and much increased within this realm, for that the ordinaries have wanted authority to proceed against those that were infected therewith: be it therefore ordained and enacted by authority of this present Parliament, that the statute made in the fifth year of the reign of King Richard II, concerning the arresting and apprehension of erroneous and heretical preachers, and one other statute made in the second year of the reign of King Henry IV, concerning the repressing of heresies and punishment of heretics, and also one other statute made in the second year of the reign of King Henry V, concerning the suppression of heresy and Lollardy, and every article, branch, and sentence contained in the same three several Acts, and every of them, shall from the twentieth day of January next coming be revived, and be in full force, strength, and effect to all intents, constructions, and purposes for ever.

This act was repealed in 1559 by section 6 of the second Act of Supremacy.

== See also ==
- First Statute of Repeal
