= Supreme Governor of the Church of England =

Title held by the British Monarch

- Incumbent; Charles III since 8 September 2022
- Church of England
- Style: His Majesty
- Residence: Buckingham Palace
- Constituting instrument: Act of Supremacy 1558
- Precursor: Supreme Head of the Church of England
- Formation: 1558
- First holder: Elizabeth I

The supreme governor of the Church of England is the titular head of the Church of England, a position which is vested in the British monarch. Although the monarch's authority over the Church of England is largely ceremonial and is mostly observed in a symbolic capacity, the position is still relevant to the established church. As the supreme governor, the monarch formally appoints high-ranking members of the church on the advice of the prime minister of the United Kingdom, who in turn acts on the advice of the Crown Nominations Commission. Since the Act of Settlement 1701, all supreme governors have been members of the Church of England.

== History ==
By 1536, King Henry VIII had broken with the Holy See, seized assets of the Catholic Church in England and Wales and declared the Church of England as the established church with himself as its supreme head. The Act of Supremacy 1534 confirmed the king's status as having supremacy over the church and required the peers to swear an oath recognising Henry's supremacy. Mary I attempted to restore the English Church's allegiance to the pope and repealed the Act of Supremacy in 1555. Elizabeth I ascended to the throne in 1558, and the Parliament restored the original Act by passing the Act of Supremacy 1558. To placate critics, the Oath of Supremacy, which peers were required to swear, set the monarch's title as supreme governor rather than supreme head of the restored Church of England. This wording avoided the charge that the monarchy was claiming divinity or subordinating Jesus of Nazareth (whom the Christian Bible explicitly identified as the head of the Church in the Epistle to the Ephesians).

"Defender of the Faith" (Fidei Defensor) has been part of the English—and since the union of Scotland and England, the British—monarch's title since Henry VIII was granted it by Pope Leo X in 1521 in recognition of Henry's role in opposing the Protestant Reformation. The pope withdrew the title, but it was later reconferred by Parliament in the reign of Edward VI.

=== Thirty-Nine Articles ===
The monarch's role is acknowledged in the preface to the Thirty-Nine Articles of 1562. It states that:

Being by God's Ordinance, according to Our just Title, Defender of the Faith and Supreme Governor of the Church, within these Our Dominions, We hold it most agreeable to this Our Kingly Office, and Our own religious zeal, to conserve and maintain the Church committed to Our Charge, in Unity of true Religion, and in the Bond of Peace ... We have therefore, upon mature Deliberation, and with the Advice of so many of Our Bishops as might conveniently be called together, thought fit to make this Declaration following ... That We are Supreme Governor of the Church of England ...

Article 37 makes this claim to royal supremacy more explicit:

The Queen's Majesty hath the chief power in this Realm of England, and other her Dominions, unto whom the chief Government of all Estates of this Realm, whether they be Ecclesiastical or Civil, in all causes doth appertain, and is not, nor ought to be, subject to any foreign Jurisdiction. ... [We] give not to our Princes the ministering either of God's Word, or of the Sacraments ... but only that prerogative, which we see to have been given always to all godly Princes in holy Scriptures by God himself; that is, that they should rule all estates and degrees committed to their charge by God, whether they be Ecclesiastical or Temporal, and restrain with the civil sword the stubborn and evildoers. The Bishop of Rome hath no jurisdiction in this Realm of England.

== Church of Scotland ==
The British monarch vows to uphold the constitution of the Church of Scotland (a Presbyterian national church), but does not hold a leadership position in it. Nevertheless, the monarch appoints the Lord High Commissioner to the General Assembly of the Church of Scotland as their personal representative, with a ceremonial role. Elizabeth II on occasion filled the role personally, as when she opened the General Assembly in 1977 and 2002 (her Silver and Golden Jubilee years).

== List of supreme governors ==
=== English ===
Name	Years	Notes
Henry VIII	1531–1547	As supreme head.
Edward VI	1547–1553	As supreme head. With Thomas Cranmer, authorised the Book of Common Prayer.
Mary I and Philip	1553–1555	As supreme head (from 1554 the couple omitted the title, without statutory authority until authorised by Parliament in 1555). Promoted the Catholic Reformation in England and Wales.
Elizabeth I	1558–1603	See Elizabethan religious settlement.
James I	1603–1625	See James VI and I and religious issues. Authorized the King James Version of the Bible.
Charles I	1625–1649	Canonised martyr of the Church of England.
Interregnum	1649–1660	
Charles II	1660–1685	Converted to Catholicism on his deathbed.
James II	1685–1688	Last Catholic to hold the position; he only held it as statutory authority.
Mary II	1689–1694	Reigned jointly with her husband (and cousin) William III.
William III	1689–1702	At first reigned jointly with Mary II, 1689–1694. Calvinist.

=== British ===
Name	Years	Notes
Anne	1702–1714	Raised an Anglican. During her reign, the Acts of Union 1707 merged England and Scotland to form the Kingdom of Great Britain. Since then, monarchs also swear to preserve the Church of Scotland. Married to the Lutheran Prince George of Denmark.
George I	1714–1727	Elector of the Holy Roman Empire. First Protestant in the line set forth by the Succession to the Crown Act 1707. Lutheran.
George II	1727–1760	Elector of the Holy Roman Empire. Lutheran.
George III	1760–1820	Head of the Lutheran Church in Hanover. Creation of the United Church of England and Ireland in 1800.
George IV	1820–1830	Catholic emancipation enacted by the Roman Catholic Relief Act 1829.
William IV	1830–1837	
Victoria	1837–1901	The Church of Ireland was disestablished by the Irish Church Act 1869.
Edward VII	1901–1910	
George V	1910–1936	The Church in Wales was disestablished by the Welsh Church Act 1914.
Edward VIII	1936	Pressured to abdicate, formalised by the His Majesty's Declaration of Abdication Act 1936.
George VI	1936–1952	
Elizabeth II	1952–2022	Longest-serving, at 70 years.
Charles III	2022–present	
