= Head of the Church =

Title in Christian religion

Head of the Church is a title given in the New Testament to Jesus. In Catholic ecclesiology, Jesus Christ is called the invisible Head or the Heavenly Head, while the Pope is called the visible Head or the Earthly Head. Therefore, the Pope is often unofficially called the Vicar of Christ by the faithful.

== New Testament ==
It is found in Colossians 1:18, Colossians 2:19, Ephesians 1:22, Ephesians 4:15 and Ephesians 5:23.

== Catholic Church ==
In Catholic ecclesiology, Jesus Christ is called the invisible Head or the Heavenly Head, while the Pope is called the visible Head or the Earthly Head. Therefore, the Pope is often unofficially called the Vicar of Christ by the faithful.

== Church of England ==
At the time of the English Reformation, Henry VIII took for himself the title of Supreme Head of the Church of England; his daughter Elizabeth I changed this to Supreme Governor of the Church of England.

== Presbyterian and Reformed (Calvinist) ==
The Presbyterian system, codified in the Westminster Standards, outlines teaching elders (Ministers) and ruling elders, and courts presided over by Moderators sitting "primus inter pares", and gives practical effect to the concept of the equal status of all believers behind the one and only head of the church - Jesus Christ. This gives rise to the section of the Westminster Confession of Faith that says in its 25th Chapter entitled "The Church", article 6: "There is no other head of the Church but the Lord Jesus Christ. Nor can the Pope of Rome, in any sense, be head thereof: but is that Antichrist, that man of sin, and son of perdition, that exalteth himself, in the Church, against Christ and all that is called God."

== Evangelical literature ==
In Evangelical literature, this Roman Catholic distinction between Visible Head and Invisible Head is often attacked as being ideas not founded in scripture. Evangelical literature harmonizes christology and ecclesiology within the context of sola scriptura.

== See also ==
- Names and titles of Jesus in the New Testament
