= Relief of Ireland Act 1640 =

Act of the Parliament of England

- Act of Parliament
- Parliament of England
- Long title: An Act for a contribution and loan for the distressed people of Ireland.
- Citation: 16 Cha. 1. c. 30
- Territorial extent: England and Wales; Ireland

Dates
- Royal assent: 31 January 1642
- Commencement: 3 November 1640 (Note: Start of session.)
- Expired: 1 June 1642 (Note: Section 1.)
- Repealed: England and Wales: 28 July 1863; Northern Ireland: 23 May 1950
Other legislation
Repealed by	England and Wales: Statute Law Revision Act 1863; Northern Ireland: Statute Law Revision Act 1950

Status: Repealed

Text of statute as originally enacted

The Relief of Ireland Act 1640 (16 Cha. 1. c. 30) was an act of the Parliament of England passed by the Long Parliament. It was the first act to be passed in relation to the Irish Rebellion of 1641.

The act was "for a speedy contribution and loan" towards the relief of the King's subjects in Ireland. The act empowered churchwardens and overseers to collect benevolences in their parishes that would be handed to Parliament. The act was to remain in force until 1 June 1642.

== Subsequent developments ==
The whole act was repealed for England and Wales by section 1 of, and the schedule to, the Statute Law Revision Act 1863 (26 & 27 Vict. c. 125), which came into force on 28 July 1863.

The whole act was repealed for Northern Ireland by section 1(1) of, and the first schedule to, the Statute Law Revision Act 1950 (14 Geo. 6. c. 6), which came into force on 23 May 1950.
