= Ecclesiastical Jurisdiction Measure 1963 =

Measure of the General Synod of the Church of England

Ecclesiastical Jurisdiction Measure 1963 (Note: Section 89.)
- Measure of the Church of England
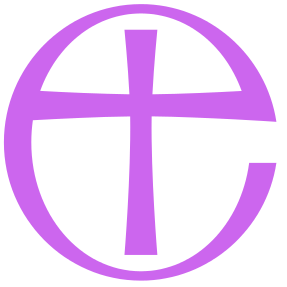
- General Synod of the Church of England
- Long title: A Measure passed by The National Assembly of the Church of England to reform and reconstruct the system of ecclesiastical courts of the Church of England, to replace with new provisions the existing enactments relating to ecclesiastical discipline, to abolish certain obsolete jurisdictions and fees, and for purposes connected therewith.
- Citation: 1963 No. 1
- Territorial extent: England

Dates
- Royal assent: 31 July 1963
- Commencement: 1 March 1965 (Note: Section 88.)

Other legislation
- Amends: See § Repealed enactments
- Repeals/revokes: See § Repealed enactments
- Amended by: Criminal Law Act 1967; Church of England (Worship and Doctrine) Measure 1974; Statute Law (Repeals) Act 1977; Clergy Discipline Measure 2003; Statute Law (Repeals) Act 2004; Statute Law (Repeals) Measure 2018; Ecclesiastical Jurisdiction and Care of Churches Measure 2018

Status: Amended

Text of statute as originally enacted

Revised text of statute as amended

Text of the Ecclesiastical Jurisdiction Measure 1963 as in force today (including any amendments) within the United Kingdom, from legislation.gov.uk.

The Ecclesiastical Jurisdiction Measure 1963 (No. 1) is a Church of England measure simplifying ecclesiastical law as it applied to the Church of England, following the recommendations of the 1954 Archbishops' Commission on Ecclesiastical Courts. Superseding the Ecclesiastical Jurisdiction Act 1677, other acts of the Parliament of the United Kingdom it repealed included the Church Discipline Act 1840 (3 & 4 Vict. c. 86), the Public Worship Regulation Act 1874 (37 & 38 Vict. c. 85), the Clergy Discipline Act 1892 (55 & 56 Vict. c. 32), and the Incumbents (Discipline) Measure 1947 (No. 1).

The first person to be prosecuted under the new measure was Michael Bland in 1969. The charges against him related to neglect of his duties, and included leaving church services early, refusing to baptise a baby, preventing one of his parishioners from entering the church to object to the marriage of his son when the banns were published, and disallowing another parishioner from receiving Holy Communion without just cause.

== Provisions ==
=== Repealed enactments ===
Section 87 of the act repealed 48 enactments, listed in the fifth schedule to the act.

Citation	Short title	Description	Extent of repeal
13 Edw. 1	Statutū Circumspecte Agatis	The Statute of Circumspecte Agatis.	The whole statute.
18 Edw. 1	Statutum de Consultatione	The Statute of the Writ of the Consultation.	The whole statute.
9 Edw. 2. Stat. 1	Articuli Cleri	Articles for the Clergy...	Chapters I, II, VI and VII.
25 Edw. 3. Stat. 6	An Ordinance for the Clergy	An Ordinance for the Clergy made at Westminster in the Twenty-fifth year of the Reign of K. Edward III.	Chapter VIII.
50 Edw. 3	N/A	Of the Pardons and Graces granted by the King to the Commonalty of His Realm of England; in the Fiftieth year of King Edward III.	The whole act.
2 Hen. 5. Stat. 1	Libels in Spiritual Courts	-	Chapter III.
21 Hen. 8. c. 6	Mortuaries Act 1529	The Mortuaries Act, 1529...	The whole act.
23 Hen. 8. c. 9	Ecclesiastical Jurisdiction Act 1531	The Ecclesiastical Jurisdiction Act, 1531.	The whole act.
24 Hen. 8. c. 12	Ecclesiastical Appeals Act 1532	The Ecclesiastical Appeals Act, 1532.	In section three, the words from “in manner and forme as hereafter ensueth” to the end. In section four, the words from the beginning to “any other courte or courtes”.
25 Hen. 8. c. 19	Submission of the Clergy Act 1533	The Submission of the Clergy Act, 1533.	In section four, the words from “but that all manner of appelles” to the end. Section six.
32 Hen. 8. c. 7	Tithe Act 1540	The Tithe Act, 1540.	In section five, the proviso.
2 & 3 Edw. 6. c. 1	Act of Uniformity 1548	The Act of Uniformity, 1548	Sections five, twelve and thirteen.
5 & 6 Edw. 6. c. 4	Brawling Act 1551	The Brawling Act, 1551.	The whole act.
1 Mary, Sess. 2. c. 3.	Brawling Act 1553	The Brawling Act, 1553.	Sections five and six.
1 Eliz. 1. c. 2	Act of Uniformity 1558	The Act of Uniformity, 1558	Sections six, eleven and twelve.
5 Eliz. 1. c. 23	Writ De Excommunicato Capiendo Act 1562	The Writ De Excommunicato Capiendo Act, 1562.	The whole act.
13 Eliz. 1. c. 12	Ordination of Ministers Act 1571	The Ordination of Ministers Act, 1571.	Section two.
1 Car. 1. c. 1	Sunday Observance Act 1625	The Sunday Observance Act, 1625.	The second proviso.
3 Car. 1. c. 2	Sunday Observance Act 1627	An Act for the further reformacion of sondry abuses committed on the Lord’s Day commonlie called Sonday.	The third proviso.
16 Car. 1. c. 11	Abolition of High Commission Court Act 1640	An Act for repeal of a branch of a Statute primo concerning Commissioners for causes Ecclesiasticall.	The whole act.
13 Car. 2. Stat. 1. c. 12	Ecclesiastical Jurisdiction Act 1661	The Ecclesiastical Jurisdiction Act, 1661.	The whole Chapter except section four.
29 Car. 2. c. 9	Ecclesiastical Jurisdiction Act 1677	The Ecclesiastical Jurisdiction Act, 1677.	The whole act.
28 Geo. 2. c. 6	Mortuaries (Chester) Act 1755	The Mortuaries (Chester) Act, 1755.	The preamble and section one.
21 Geo. 3. c. 49	Sunday Observance Act 1780	The Sunday Observance Act, 1780.	Section seven.
31 Geo. 3. c. 32	Roman Catholic Relief Act 1791	The Roman Catholic Relief Act, 1791.	In section twelve, the words “in any ecclesiastical court or elsewhere”.
53 Geo. 3. c. 127	Ecclesiastical Courts Act 1813	The Ecclesiastical Courts Act, 1813.	Sections one, two and three and the Schedules. In section five, the words “or in any Ecclesiastical Court”. In section seven, the second proviso. The Schedules.
10 Geo. 4. c. 53	Ecclesiastical Courts Act 1829	The Ecclesiastical Courts Act, 1829.	The whole act.
2 & 3 Will. 4. c. 92	Privy Council Appeals Act 1832	The Privy Council Appeals Act, 1832.	The whole act.
2 & 3 Will. 4. c. 93	Ecclesiastical Courts (Contempt) Act 1832	The Ecclesiastical Courts (Contempt) Act, 1832.	The whole act.
3 & 4 Vict. c. 86	Church Discipline Act 1840	The Church Discipline Act, 1840.	The whole act.
3 & 4 Vict. c. 93	Ecclesiastical Courts Act 1840	The Ecclesiastical Courts Act, 1840.	The whole act.
7 & 8 Vict. c. 59	Lecturers and Parish Clerks Act 1844	The Lecturers and Parish Clerks Act, 1844.	In section one, the words from “and in case” to the end, and section five.
10 & 11 Vict. c. 98	Ecclesiastical Jurisdiction Act 1847	The Ecclesiastical Jurisdiction Act, 1847.	Section nine.
17 & 18 Vict. c. 47	Ecclesiastical Courts Act 1854	The Ecclesiastical Courts Act, 1854.	The whole act.
18 & 19 Vict. c. 41	Ecclesiastical Courts Act 1855	The Ecclesiastical Courts Act, 1855.	The whole act.
23 & 24 Vict. c. 32	Ecclesiastical Courts Jurisdiction Act 1860	The Ecclesiastical Courts Jurisdiction Act, 1860.	Section one.
33 & 34 Vict. c. 23	Forfeiture Act 1870	The Forfeiture Act, 1870.	Section two in so far as it relates to ecclesiastical benefices and the holders thereof.
37 & 38 Vict. c. 85	Public Worship Regulation Act 1874	The Public Worship Regulation Act, 1874.	The whole act.
39 & 40 Vict. c. 59	Appellate Jurisdiction Act 1876	The Appellate Jurisdiction Act, 1876.	In section fourteen the words from “Her Majesty may by Order in Council” to the end.
55 & 56 Vict. c. 32	Clergy Discipline Act 1892	The Clergy Discipline Act, 1892.	The whole act.
16 & 17 Geo. 5. No. 4		The Ecclesiastical Commissioners Measure, 1926.	Section five.
26 Geo. 5. & 1 Edw. 8. No. 5	Ecclesiastical Commissioners (Powers) Measure 1936	The Ecclesiastical Commissioners (Powers) Measure, 1936.	Section nine.
10 & 11 Geo. 6. No. 1	Incumbents (Discipline) Measure 1947	The Incumbents (Discipline) Measure , 1947.	The whole measure.
12 & 13 Geo. 6. No. 1	Church Dignitaries (Retirement) Measure 1949	The Church Dignitaries (Retirement) Measure, 1949.	Part II. In section thirteen, in subsection (1), the words “or Part II” and, in subsection (4), the words “and subsection (2) of section five”. In section fourteen, the words “or both under Part II of this Measure and under the Incumbents (Discipline) Measure, 1947”. the words “or the said Measure of 1947”, in both places where they occur, the words “if the proceedings were taken under the Measure of 1945” and the words from “and (ii) if” to “under this Measure”. In section eighteen, in the definition of “prescribed” the words “the Incumbents (Discipline) Measure, 1947, or”.
13 & 14 Geo. 6. No. 1	Incumbents (Discipline) Measure 1947 (Amendment) Measure 1950	The Incumbents (Discipline) Measure, 1947 (Amendment) Measure , 1950.	The whole measure.
14 & 15 Geo. 6. c. 39	Common Informers Act 1951	The Common Informers Act, 1951.	In the Schedule, the entry relating to the Ecclesiastical Jurisdiction Act, 1531.
14 & 15 Geo. 6. No. 2	Bishops (Retirement) Measure 1951	The Bishops (Retirement) Measure, 1951.	Part III. In section thirteen, the words “Part I or Part II of”. In section fifteen, the words from “and in the case” to the end. In section sixteen, in subsection (1), the definition of “The pensions authority” and in subsection (2), the words “or who is a complainant or promoter under Part III hereof”.
1 & 2 Eliz. 2. No. 3	Incumbents (Discipline) and Church Dignitaries (Retirement) Amendment Measure 1953	The Incumbents (Discipline) and Church Dignitaries (Retirement) Amendment Measure, 1953.	The whole measure.

== Bibliography ==
- Cross, F. L.; Livingstone, E. A., eds. (2005), "Ecclesiastical Jurisdiction Measure 1963", Oxford Dictionary of the Christian Church (online ed.), Oxford University Press, ISBN 978-0-19-280290-3 (subscription required)
- Massingberd, Hugh, ed. (2001) [2 July 1987], "The Reverend Michael Bland", The Very Best of the Daily Telegraph Books of Obituaries, Pan Books, pp. 41–43, ISBN 978-0-330-48470-1
