= De Excommunicato Deliberando =

A de excommunicato deliberando is a writ which issued out of chancery to release a prisoner from the county jail after the bishop had certified the prisoner's reconciliation with the Church, following his arrest and imprisonment under a writ de excommunicato capiendo.

== See also ==
- De Excommunicato Capiendo
