= Brawling Act 1551 =

Act of the Parliament of England

Brawling Act 1551 (Note: The citation of this act by this short title was authorised by section 5 of, and the second schedule to, the Statute Law Revision Act 1948. Due to the repeal of those provisions, it is now authorised by section 19(2) of the Interpretation Act 1978.)
- Act of Parliament
- Parliament of England
- Long title: An Acte agaynste fightinge and quarelinge in Churches and Chrcheyardes. (Note: These words are printed against this act in the second column of the second schedule to the Statute Law Revision Act 1948, which is headed "Title".)
- Citation: 5 & 6 Edw. 6. c. 4
- Territorial extent: England and Wales

Dates
- Royal assent: 15 April 1552
- Commencement: 1 May 1552 (Note: Section 2.)
- Repealed: 1 March 1965
Other legislation
Amended by	Offences Against the Person Act 1828; Criminal Law (India) Act 1828; Ecclesiastical Courts Jurisdiction Act 1860; Statute Law Revision Act 1888
Repealed by	Ecclesiastical Jurisdiction Measure 1963

Status: Repealed

Text of statute as originally enacted

The Brawling Act 1551 (5 & 6 Edw. 6. c. 4) was an act of the Parliament of England.

== Subsequent developments ==
So much of the act as related to the punishment of persons convicted of striking with any weapon, or drawing any weapon with intent to strike as therein mentioned, was repealed by section 1 of the Offences against the Person Act 1828 (9 Geo. 4. c. 31). The marginal note to that section said that the effect of this was to repeal section 3 of the act.

The act was repealed, so far as it related to persons not in Holy Orders, by section 5 of the Ecclesiastical Courts Jurisdiction Act 1860 (23 & 24 Vict. c. 32).

Section 2 of the act, from "further" to "aforesaide" was repealed by section 1(1) of, and Part I of the Schedule to, the Statute Law Revision Act 1888 (51 & 52 Vict. c. 3).

The whole act was repealed by section 87 of, and the fifth schedule to, the Ecclesiastical Jurisdiction Measure 1963 (No. 1), which came into force on 1 March 1965.

== See also ==
- Brawling (legal definition)
