= Ecclesiastical Jurisdiction Act 1661 =

Act of the Parliament of England

Ecclesiastical Jurisdiction Act 1661 (Note: The citation of this act by this short title was authorised by section 5 of, and the second schedule to, the Statute Law Revision Act 1948. Due to the repeal of those provisions, it is now authorised by section 19(2) of the Interpretation Act 1978.)
- Act of Parliament
- Parliament of England
- Long title: An Act for Explanation of a Clause contained in Act of Parliament made in the seventeenth yeare of the late King Charles, Entitled An Act for Repeal of a Branch of a Statute Primo Elizabethe concerning Commissioners for Causes Ecclesiasticall. (Note: These words are printed against this act in the second column of the second schedule to the Statute Law Revision Act 1948, which is headed "Title".)
- Citation: 13 Cha. 2 St. 1. c. 12
- Territorial extent: England and Wales

Dates
- Royal assent: 30 July 1661
- Commencement: 8 May 1661 (Note: Start of session.)
- Repealed: 1 January 1970
Other legislation
Amends	Act of Uniformity 1558; Abolition of High Commission Court Act 1640
Repealed by	Statute Law Revision Act 1888; Ecclesiastical Jurisdiction Measure 1963; Statute Law (Repeals) Act 1969

Status: Repealed

Text of statute as originally enacted

The Ecclesiastical Jurisdiction Act 1661 (13 Cha. 2 St. 1. c. 12) was an act of the Parliament of England.

== Subsequent developments ==
The words of enactment in sections 2, 3 and 4 of the act were repealed by section 1(1) of, and part I of the schedule to, the Statute Law Revision Act 1888 (51 & 52 Vict. c. 3), which came into force on 27 March 1888.

The whole act, except section 4, was repealed by section 87 of, and the fifth schedule to, the Ecclesiastical Jurisdiction Measure 1963 (No. 1), which came into force on 1 March 1965.

The whole act, so far as unrepealed, was repealed by section 1 of, and part II of the schedule to, the Statute Law (Repeals) Act 1969, which came into force on 1 January 1970.
