= Act of Uniformity 1558 =

Act of the Parliament of England

Act of Uniformity 1558 (Note: The citation of this act by this short title was authorised by section 5 of, and the second schedule to, the Statute Law Revision Act 1948. Due to the repeal of those provisions, it is now authorised by section 19(2) of the Interpretation Act 1978.)
- Act of Parliament
- Parliament of England
- Long title: An Acte for the Uniformitie of Common Prayoure and Dyvyne Service in the Churche, and the Administration of the Sacramentes. (Note: These words are printed against this act in the second column of the second schedule to the Statute Law Revision Act 1948, which is headed "Title".)
- Citation: 1 Eliz. 1. c. 2
- Territorial extent: England and Wales; Ireland

Dates
- Royal assent: 8 May 1559
- Commencement: 24 June 1559 (Note: Section 1. The Feast of the Nativity of John the Baptist.)
- Repealed: Northern Ireland: 23 May 1950; England and Wales: 1 September 1975
Other legislation
Amends	First Statute of Repeal
Amended by	Ecclesiastical Jurisdiction Act 1661; Roman Catholics Act 1844
Repealed by	Northern Ireland: Statute Law Revision Act 1950; England and Wales: Religious Disabilities Act 1846, Statute Law Revision Act 1863, Statute Law Revision Act 1888, Statute Law Revision Act 1948, Criminal Justice Act 1948, Ecclesiastical Jurisdiction Measure 1963, Criminal Justice Act 1967, Statute Law (Repeals) Act 1969 and Church of England (Worship and Doctrine) Measure 1974
Relates to	Act of Uniformity 1548; Act of Uniformity 1551; Act of Supremacy 1558

Status: Repealed

Text of statute as originally enacted

The Act of Uniformity 1558 (1 Eliz. 1. c. 2) was an act of the Parliament of England, passed in 1559, (Note: The Act of Uniformity was passed in April 1559. However, all acts of Parliament prior to the Acts of Parliament (Commencement) Act 1793 (33 Geo. 3. c. 13) were ex post facto laws that came into effect on the first day of the session. The first Parliament of Elizabeth I met three months earlier in January 1558; the year 1559 did not begin until 25 March 1559. Therefore, the Act of Uniformity was officially dated 1558 by the Statute Law Revision Act 1948 (11 & 12 Geo. 6. c. 62).) to regularise prayer, divine worship and the administration of the sacraments in the Church of England. In so doing, it mandated worship according to the attached 1559 Book of Common Prayer. The act was part of the Elizabethan Religious Settlement in England instituted by Elizabeth I, who wanted to unify the church and abolish the influence of the Catholic Church in England and Wales. Other acts concerned with this settlement were the Act of Supremacy 1558 (1 Eliz. 1. c. 1) and the Thirty-Nine Articles.

== Background ==
Elizabeth was trying to achieve a settlement after 30 years of turmoil during the reigns of Henry VIII, Edward VI, and Mary I, during which England had swung from Roman Catholicism to Protestantism and back to Catholicism. Though reformers had rejoiced with the accession of Elizabeth to the throne, they found that Catholicism was more deeply rooted in England than what they had thought. The bishops issued in February 1559 a document affirming the belief in the Real Presence, Transubstantiation, the sacrificial and sacramental character of the Mass and papal supremacy. Therefore, the reform would need to be pushed through by the parliament. Parliamentary sessions on discussion of the act began on 23 January 1559.

== The act ==
The act was clearly Protestant in its nature and repealed all legislation of Mary. The outcome of the Elizabethan Settlement was a sometimes tense and often fragile union of High Church and Low Church elements within the Church of England and Anglicanism worldwide. Though it was less radical than the act of 1552 and made some minor concessions to Catholics in hope they would comply with the new order. The vote in parliament was passed by only three votes: the creation of the new Church of England was therefore dependent on a slim majority in parliament and against the will of the bishops. Though most Protestants accepted this compromise, some were disappointed which led to the rise of a "Puritan" party that made the case for more thorough and consistent Reformation. These Protestants were against the inclusion of saints' feast days in the Church calendar, against the "cult of Elizabeth" that developed at the court and the use of crosses, vestments, holy water and blessings.

The act replaced the Latin Mass with the Communion Service and set the order of prayer to be used in the 1559 Book of Common Prayer. All persons had to attend Anglican services once a week or be fined 12 pence (equal to about three days wages or around £24 today). (Note: Average earnings in 1558 were £6.06 per annum, equal to 2s. 4d. a week or 4d. a day.)

== Subsequent developments ==
On 27 September 1650, the act was repealed by the Rump Parliament of the Commonwealth of England with the Act for the Repeal of several Clauses in Statutes imposing Penalties for not coming to Church, but this act was rendered null and void with the Restoration of the monarchy in 1660.

So much of the act "as relates to a Person's resorting to his Parish Church or Chapel accustomed, or, upon reasonable Let thereof, to some usual Place where Common Prayer and such Service of God as in such Acts are mentioned are used in such Time of Let, upon Sundays and other Days ordained and used to be kept as holy Days, and to his then and there abiding orderly and soberly during the Time of the Common Prayer, Preaching, or other Service of God there used and ministered" was repealed by section 1 of the Religious Disabilities Act 1846 (9 & 10 Vict. c. 59), which came into force on 18 August 1846.

Section 7 of the act was repealed by section 1 of, and the schedule to, the Statute Law Revision Act 1863 (26 & 27 Vict. c. 125), which came into force on 28 July 1863.

Section three, from "it is" to first "abovesayd"; five, from "it is" to "aforesaid that", section six, section nine, section ten, section eleven, from "and be yt (or it)" to first "aforesaid", section eight, section fourteen, from "be it (or yt)" to "aforesaid that" and in sections twelve and thirteen, the words "and bee it enacted", were repealed by section 1 of, and the schedule to, the Statute Law Revision Act 1888 (51 & 52 Vict. c. 3), which came into force on 27 March 1888.

Sections 6, 11 and 12 of the act repealed by section 87 of, and the fifth schedule to, the Ecclesiastical Jurisdiction Measure 1963 (No. 1), which came into force on 1 March 1965.

Section 10 of the act was repealed by section 10(2) of, and part I of schedule 3 to, the Criminal Law Act 1967, which came into force on 1 January 1968.

The whole act, so far as unrepealed, except section 13, was repealed by section 1 of, and part II of the schedule to, the Statute Law (Repeals) Act 1969, which came into force on 1 January 1970.

The whole act, so far as unrepealed, was repealed by section 6(3) of, and schedule 2 to, the Church of England (Worship and Doctrine) Measure 1974 (1974, No. 3).

== See also ==
- Acts of Supremacy
- Acts of Uniformity
- Conformist
- Nonconformist
- Religion in the United Kingdom
- A View of Popish Abuses yet remaining in the English Church
