= Ecclesiastical Jurisdiction Act 1677 =

Act of the Parliament of England

Ecclesiastical Jurisdiction Act 1677 (Note: The citation of this act by this short title was authorised by section 5 of, and the second schedule to, the Statute Law Revision Act 1948. Due to the repeal of those provisions, it is now authorised by section 19(2) of the Interpretation Act 1978.)
- Act of Parliament
- Parliament of England
- Long title: An Act for takeing away the Writt De Heretico cumburendo (Note: These words are printed against this act in the second column of the second schedule to the Statute Law Revision Act 1948, which is headed "Title".)
- Citation: 29 Cha. 2. c. 9
- Territorial extent: England and Wales

Dates
- Royal assent: 16 April 1677
- Commencement: 15 February 1677 (Note: Start of session.)
- Repealed: 1 March 1965
Other legislation
Repealed by	Ecclesiastical Jurisdiction Measure 1963

Status: Repealed

Text of statute as originally enacted

The Ecclesiastical Jurisdiction Act 1677 (29 Cha. 2. c. 9) was an act of the Parliament of England that abolished the death penalty for heresy, blasphemy, atheism, schism, and such crimes.

== Subsequent developments ==
The whole act was repealed by section 87 of, and the fifth schedule to, the Ecclesiastical Jurisdiction Measure 1963 (No. 1), which came into force on 1 March 1965.

== See also ==
- Blasphemy law in the United Kingdom
- Capital punishment in the United Kingdom
