= Act of Supremacy 1558 =

Act of the Parliament of England

Act of Supremacy 1558 (Note: The act was passed in April 1559, so many sources refer to it by the year 1559. However, all acts of Parliament prior to 1793 were ex post facto laws that came into effect on the first day of the session. The first Parliament of Elizabeth I met three months earlier in January 1558; the year 1559 did not begin until 25 March 1559. Therefore, the Act of Supremacy is officially dated 1558.) (Note: The citation of this act by this short title was authorised by section 5 of, and the second schedule to, the Statute Law Revision Act 1948. Due to the repeal of those provisions, it is now authorised by section 19(2) of the Interpretation Act 1978.)
- Act of Parliament
- Parliament of England
- Long title: An Acte restoring to the Crowne thauncyent Jurisdiction over the State Ecclesiasticall and Spirituall, and abolyshing all Forreine Power repugnaunt to the same.
- Citation: 1 Eliz. 1. c. 1
- Territorial extent: England and Wales; Ireland

Dates
- Royal assent: 8 May 1559
- Commencement: 23 January 1559 (Note: Start of session.)
- Repealed: Northern Ireland: 18 December 1953
Other legislation
Repeals/revokes	Heresy Act 1382; Act of Supremacy 1534; Revival of the Heresy Acts
Amended by	Abolition of High Commission Court Act 1640; Ecclesiastical Jurisdiction Act 1661; Roman Catholics Act 1844; Religious Disabilities Act 1846; Statute Law Revision Act 1863; Promissory Oaths Act 1871; Statute Law Revision Act 1888; Criminal Justice Act 1948; Statute Law Revision Act 1948; Statute Law Revision Act 1950; Criminal Law Act 1967; Statute Law (Repeals) Act 1969
Repealed by	Northern Ireland: Statute Law Revision Act 1950 and Statute Law Revision Act 1953

Status: Partially repealed

Text of statute as originally enacted

Revised text of statute as amended

Text of the Act of Supremacy 1558 as in force today (including any amendments) within the United Kingdom, from legislation.gov.uk.

The Act of Supremacy 1558 (1 Eliz. 1. c. 1), also known as the Act of Supremacy 1559, is an act of the Parliament of England, which replaced the original Act of Supremacy 1534 (26 Hen. 8. c. 1), and becoming law during the reign of Elizabeth I. The 1534 act was issued by Elizabeth's father, Henry VIII, arrogating ecclesiastical authority to the monarch, but this law had been repealed by Mary I. Along with the Act of Uniformity 1558, the Supremacy Act made up what is generally referred to as the Elizabethan Religious Settlement.

The act remained in place until the 19th century, when some sections began to be repealed. By 1969, all provisions, except section 8 (which still remains in force), had been repealed by various acts, with the whole act repealed in Northern Ireland between 1950 and 1953.

== The act ==
The act revived ten acts formerly revoked by Mary I, significantly clarified and narrowed the definition of what constituted heresy, and confirmed Elizabeth as Supreme Governor of the Church of England. Compared to Henry VIII's title of "Supreme Head", Supreme Governor avoided the blasphemous implication that Elizabeth was superior in rank to Jesus, whom the Epistle to the Ephesians identifies as head of the church.

The act also made it a crime to assert the authority of any foreign prince, prelate, or other authority, and was aimed at abolishing the authority of the pope in England. A third offence was high treason, punishable by death.

=== The oath ===
Supremacy of the Crown Act 1562
- Act of Parliament
- Parliament of England
- Long title: An Act for the Assurance of the Queen's Royal Power over all Estates and Subjects within her Dominions.
- Citation: 5 Eliz. 1. c. 1
- Territorial extent: England and Wales; Isle of Man

Dates
- Royal assent: 10 April 1563
- Commencement: 1 April 1563 (Note: Section 1.)
- Repealed: England and Wales: 18 August 1846; Isle of Man: 25 July 1991
Other legislation
Amended by	Roman Catholics Act 1844
Repealed by	England and Wales: Religious Disabilities Act 1846; Isle of Man: Statute Law Revision (Isle of Man) Act 1991
Relates to	Act of Supremacy 1558

Status: Repealed

Text of statute as originally enacted

The Oath of Supremacy, imposed by the act, provided for any person taking public or church office in England to swear allegiance to the monarch as Supreme Governor of the Church of England. Failure to so swear was a crime, although it did not become treason until 1562, when the Supremacy of the Crown Act 1562 (5 Eliz. 1. c. 1) made refusal to take the oath a treasonable offence. The oath was later extended to include Members of Parliament and those studying at universities: all but one of the bishops lost their posts and a hundred fellows of Oxford colleges were deprived of theirs—many dignitaries resigned rather than take the oath. The bishops who were removed from the ecclesiastical bench were replaced by appointees who would agree to the reforms.

Text of the oath as published in 1559:

I, A. B., do utterly testify and declare in my conscience that the Queen's Highness is the only supreme governor of this realm, and of all other her Highness's dominions and countries, as well in all spiritual or ecclesiastical things or causes, as temporal, and that no foreign prince, person, prelate, state or potentate hath or ought to have any jurisdiction, power, superiority, pre-eminence or authority ecclesiastical or spiritual within this realm; and therefore I do utterly renounce and forsake all foreign jurisdictions, powers, superiorities and authorities, and do promise that from henceforth I shall bear faith and true allegiance to the Queen's Highness, her heirs and lawful successors, and to my power shall assist and defend all jurisdictions, pre-eminences, privileges and authorities granted or belonging to the Queen's Highness, her heirs or successors, or united or annexed to the imperial crown of this realm. So help me God, and by the contents of this Book.

This had a specific impact on English Roman Catholics since it expressly indicates that they must forswear allegiance to Roman Catholicism, inasmuch as the Church of Rome was directly a foreign jurisdiction, power, superiority and authority. However, during the early years of her reign Elizabeth practised religious clemency and tolerance, which was an attempt to harmonise the state of affairs between the Roman Catholics and the Church of England. This was necessary for Elizabeth to establish her power fully, hold off threats of invasion from France and Spain, and to counter accusations of illegitimacy that plagued her early years. In the last twenty years of her reign, as the Pope issued official encouragement to topple, and even kill, Elizabeth, as Jesuits infiltrated England, and as the threat of Spanish invasion loomed, Catholics became targets for oppression. Later, Roman Catholic power within England waned (because Roman Catholics were forbidden to take public office and were slowly deprived of their lands and fortunes), but their influence grew again until they attempted the Gunpowder Plot in 1605 – whereupon they were further oppressed for nearly 200 years.

=== Text in force today ===
Section 8 of the act still remains in force for England and Wales, and reads as follows:

AND That suche Jurisdictions Privileges Superiorities and Preheminences Spirituall and Ecclesiasticall, as by any Spirituall or Ecclesiasticall Power or Aucthorite hathe heretofore bene or may lawfully be exercised or used for the Visitacion of the Ecclesiasticall State and Persons, and for Reformacion Order and Correccion of the same and of all maner of Errours Heresies Scismes Abuses Offences Contemptes and Enormities, shall for ever by aucthorite of this present Parliament be united and annexed to the Imperiall Crowne of this Realme: ...

== Subsequent developments ==
The words at the end were repealed by the Abolition of High Commission Court Act 1640 (16 Cha. 1. c. 11), which came into force on 3 November 1640.

Sections 10–13 of the act were repealed by section 1 of, and part II of schedule one to, the Promissory Oaths Act 1871 (34 & 35 Vict. c. 48), which came into force on 13 July 1871.

Section 8 of the act was repealed for Northern Ireland by section 1(1) of, and the first schedule to, the Statute Law Revision Act 1950 (14 Geo. 6. c. 6), which came into force on 23 May 1950.

Section 15 of the act was repealed by section 10(2) of, and part I of schedule 3 to, the Criminal Law Act 1967, which came into force on 1 January 1968.

The whole act, so far as unrepealed, except section 8, was repealed by section 1 of, and part II of the schedule to, the Statute Law (Repeals) Act 1969, which came into force on 1 January 1970.

== Related legislation ==
Treason Act 1558
- Act of Parliament
- Parliament of England
- Long title: An Act whereby certain Offences be made Treason.
- Citation: 1 Eliz. 1. c. 5
- Territorial extent: England and Wales

Dates
- Royal assent: 8 May 1559
- Commencement: 1 May 1860 (Note: Section 1.)
- Repealed: 28 July 1863
Other legislation
Amends	Treason Act 1554
Repealed by	Statute Law Revision Act 1863
Relates to	Act of Supremacy (Ireland) 1560; Papal Jurisdiction Act 1560; Seditious Words Act 1558

Status: Repealed

Text of statute as originally enacted

A similar act was passed in Ireland in the following year, called the Act of Supremacy (Ireland) 1560 (2 Eliz. 1. c. 1 (I)).

The Papal Jurisdiction Act 1560 (c. 2 (S)) remains in force in Scotland.

Another act, the Treason Act 1558 (1 Eliz. 1. c. 5), made it treason to "compass" or "imagine" to deprive the Queen (or her heirs) of the Crown, or destroy her or her heirs, or levy war against them in their dominions, or depose them, or say that they are not or ought not to be the monarch.

Another act, the Seditious Words Act 1558 (1 Eliz. 1. c. 6), dealt with sedition.

== Subsequent developments ==
The whole act, so far as unrepealed, was repealed for Northern Ireland by section 1 of, and the first schedule to, the Statute Law Revision Act 1953 (2 & 3 Eliz. 2. c. 5), which came into force on 18 December 1953.

== See also ==
- Elizabethan Religious Settlement
- List of Protestant martyrs of the English Reformation
- Religion in the United Kingdom
- Praemunire
- High treason in the United Kingdom
- Jesuits, etc. Act 1584

== Bibliography ==
- Ruffhead, Owen (1763), "Act of Supremacy 1558", The Statutes at Large, vol. 2, London, pp. 517–514
