= List of acts of the Parliament of England from 1558 =

This is a list of acts of the Parliament of England for the year 1558.

For acts passed during the period 1707–1800, see the list of acts of the Parliament of Great Britain. See also the list of acts of the Parliament of Scotland, and the list of acts of the Parliament of Ireland.

For acts passed from 1801 onwards, see the list of acts of the Parliament of the United Kingdom. For acts of the devolved parliaments and assemblies in the United Kingdom, see the list of acts of the Scottish Parliament, the list of acts of the Northern Ireland Assembly, and the list of acts and measures of Senedd Cymru; see also the list of acts of the Parliament of Northern Ireland.

For medieval statutes, etc. that are not considered to be acts of Parliament, see the list of English statutes.

See also the List of ordinances and acts of the Parliament of England, 1642–1660 for ordinances and acts passed by the Long Parliament and other bodies without royal assent, and which were not considered to be valid legislation following the Restoration in 1660.

The number shown after each act's title is its chapter number. Acts are cited using this number, preceded by the years of the reign during which the relevant parliamentary session was held; thus the Union with Ireland Act 1800 is cited as "39 & 40 Geo. 3. c. 67", meaning the 67th act passed during the session that started in the 39th year of the reign of George III and which finished in the 40th year of that reign. The modern convention is to use Arabic numerals in citations (thus "41 Geo. 3" rather than "41 Geo. III"). Acts of the last session of the Parliament of Great Britain and the first session of the Parliament of the United Kingdom are both cited as "41 Geo. 3".

Acts passed by the Parliament of England did not have a short title; however, some of these acts have subsequently been given a short title by acts of the Parliament of the United Kingdom, such as the Short Titles Act 1896 (59 & 60 Vict. c. 14).

Acts passed by the Parliament of England were deemed to have come into effect on the first day of the session in which they were passed. Because of this, the years given in the list below may in fact be the year before a particular act was passed.

== 1 Eliz. 1 ==
The 1st Parliament of Queen Elizabeth I, which met from 23 January 1559 until 8 May 1559.

This session was traditionally cited as 1 Eliz., 1 Elz, or 1 El.

=== Public acts ===
Short title	Citation	Royal assent
Long title
Act of Supremacy 1558 (repealed)	1 Eliz. 1. c. 1	8 May 1559
An Act restoring to the Crown the ancient Jurisdiction over the State Ecclesiastical and Spiritual, and abolishing all Foreign Power repugnant to the same. (Repealed for Northern Ireland by Statute Law Revision Act 1950 (14 Geo. 6. c. 6) and Statute Law Revision Act 1953 (2 & 3 Eliz. 2. c. 5))
Act of Uniformity 1558 (repealed)	1 Eliz. 1. c. 2	8 May 1559
An Acte for the Uniformitie of Common Prayoure and Dyvyne Service in the Churche, and the Administration of the Sacramentes. (Repealed for Northern Ireland by Statute Law Revision Act 1950 (14 Geo. 6. c. 6) and for England and Wales by Religious Disabilities Act 1846 (9 & 10 Vict. c. 59), Statute Law Revision Act 1863 (26 & 27 Vict. c. 125), Statute Law Revision Act 1888 (51 & 52 Vict. c. 3), Statute Law Revision Act 1948 (11 & 12 Geo. 6. c. 62), Criminal Justice Act 1948 (11 & 12 Geo. 6. c. 58), Ecclesiastical Jurisdiction Measure 1963 (No. 1), Criminal Law Act 1967 (c. 58), Statute Law (Repeals) Act 1969 (c. 52), Church of England (Worship and Doctrine) Measure 1974 (No. 3))
Queen's Title to the Crown Act 1558 (repealed)	1 Eliz. 1. c. 3	8 May 1559
An Act of Recognition of the Queen's Highness's Title to the Imperial Crown of this Realm. (Repealed by Statute Law Revision Act 1948 (11 & 12 Geo. 6. c. 62))
First Fruits and Tenths Act 1558 (repealed)	1 Eliz. 1. c. 4	8 May 1559
An Act for the Restitution of the First Fruits, and Tenths and Rents reserved Nomine Decime, and of Parsonages Impropriate, to the Imperial Crown of this Realm. (Repealed by Statute Law Revision Act 1863 (26 & 27 Vict. c. 125), First Fruits and Tenths Measure 1926 (No. 5) and Statute Law Revision Act 1948 (11 & 12 Geo. 6. c. 62))
Treason Act 1558 (repealed)	1 Eliz. 1. c. 5	8 May 1559
An Act whereby certain Offences be made Treason. (Repealed by Statute Law Revision Act 1863 (26 & 27 Vict. c. 125))
Seditious Words Act 1558 (repealed)	1 Eliz. 1. c. 6	8 May 1559
An Act for the Explanation of the Statute of seditious Words and Rumours. (Repealed by Statute Law Revision Act 1863 (26 & 27 Vict. c. 125))
Exportation Act 1558 (repealed)	1 Eliz. 1. c. 7	8 May 1559
An Act for the reviving of a Statute, made in the 23th Year of King Henry the Eighth, (Note: Conveyance of Horses into Scotland Act 1531 (23 Hen. 8. c. 16)) touching the conveying of Horses, Geldings, and Mares, into Scotlande, without Licence. (Repealed by Statute Law Revision Act 1863 (26 & 27 Vict. c. 125))
Leather Act 1558 (repealed)	1 Eliz. 1. c. 8	8 May 1559
An Act touching Shoe-makers and Curriers. (Repealed by Repeal of Obsolete Statutes Act 1856 (19 & 20 Vict. c. 64))
Leather (No. 2) Act 1558 (repealed)	1 Eliz. 1. c. 9	8 May 1559
An Act touching Tanners, and selling of Tanned Leather. (Repealed by Repeal of Obsolete Statutes Act 1856 (19 & 20 Vict. c. 64))
Exportation (No. 2) Act 1558 (repealed)	1 Eliz. 1. c. 10	8 May 1559
An Act that the carrying of leather, tallow or raw hides, out of the realm for merchandize, shall be felony. (Repealed by Repeal of Acts Concerning Importation Act 1822 (3 Geo. 4. c. 41))
Customs Act 1558 or the Act of Frauds (repealed)	1 Eliz. 1. c. 11	8 May 1559
An Act limiting the time for laying on land merchandizes from beyond the seas, and touching customs for sweet wines. (Repealed by Customs Law Repeal Act 1825 (6 Geo. 4. c. 105))
Linen Act 1558 (repealed)	1 Eliz. 1. c. 12	8 May 1559
An Act against the deceitful using of Linen Cloth. (Repealed by Statute Law Revision Act 1863 (26 & 27 Vict. c. 125))
Navigation Act 1558 (repealed)	1 Eliz. 1. c. 13	8 May 1559
An Act for the shipping in English Bottoms. (Repealed by Repeal of Acts Concerning Importation Act 1822 (3 Geo. 4. c. 41))
Woollen Cloths Act 1558 (repealed)	1 Eliz. 1. c. 14	8 May 1559
An Act for the continuing of making of Woollen Cloths, in divers Towns, in the County of Essex. (Repealed by Woollen Manufacture Act 1809 (49 Geo. 3. c. 109))
Timber Act 1558 (repealed)	1 Eliz. 1. c. 15	8 May 1559
An Act that Timber shall not be felled, to make Coals for burning of Iron. (Repealed by Repeal of Obsolete Statutes Act 1856 (19 & 20 Vict. c. 64))
Riot Act 1558 (repealed)	1 Eliz. 1. c. 16	8 May 1559
An Act for the Continuance of a Statute made against Rebellious Assemblies. (Repealed by Statute Law Revision Act 1863 (26 & 27 Vict. c. 125))
Fisheries Act 1558 (repealed)	1 Eliz. 1. c. 17	8 May 1559
An Act for Preservation of Spawn and Fry of Fish. (Repealed for England and Wales by Statute Law Revision Act 1863 (26 & 27 Vict. c. 125), Fisheries (Severn and Verniew) Act 1778 (18 Geo. 3. c. 33) and Salmon Fisheries Act 1861 (24 & 25 Vict. c. 109) and for Northern Ireland by Statute Law Revision Act 1948 (11 & 12 Geo. 6. c. 62))
Continuance of Laws Act 1558 (repealed)	1 Eliz. 1. c. 18	8 May 1559
An Act for the Continuation of certain Statutes. (Repealed by Statute Law Revision Act 1863 (26 & 27 Vict. c. 125))
Alienation by Bishops Act 1558 (repealed)	1 Eliz. 1. c. 19	8 May 1559
An Act, giving Authority to the Queen's Majesty, upon the Avoidance of any Archbishoprick or Bishoprick, to take into Her Hands certain of the Temporal Possessions thereof, recompensing the same with Parsonages Impropriate and Tenths. (Repealed by Statute Law Revision Act 1863 (26 & 27 Vict. c. 125) and Statute Law Revision Act 1948 (11 & 12 Geo. 6. c. 62))
Taxation Act 1558 (repealed)	1 Eliz. 1. c. 20	8 May 1559
An Act of a Subsidy of Tonnage and Poundage. (Repealed by Statute Law Revision Act 1863 (26 & 27 Vict. c. 125))
Taxation (No. 2) Act 1558 (repealed)	1 Eliz. 1. c. 21	8 May 1559
An Act of a Subsidy and Two Fifteenths and Tenths, granted by the Temporalty. (Repealed by Statute Law Revision Act 1863 (26 & 27 Vict. c. 125))
Regulation of Royal Foundations Act 1558 (repealed)	1 Eliz. 1. c. 22	8 May 1559
An Act that the Queen's Highness may make Ordinances and Rules, in Collegiate Churches, Corporations, and Schools. (Repealed by Statute Law Revision Act 1863 (26 & 27 Vict. c. 125))
Restoration of Dignity of Anne Boleyn Act 1558 (repealed)	1 Eliz. 1. c. 23 (Note: This is the citation in The Statutes of the Realm.); 1 Eliz. 1. c. 1 Pr. (Note: This is the citation in The Statutes at Large.)	8 May 1559
An Act, whereby the Queen's Highness is restored in Blood to the late Queen Anne, Her Highness's Mother. (Repealed by Statute Law Revision Act 1948 (11 & 12 Geo. 6. c. 62))
Religious Houses Act 1558 (repealed)	1 Eliz. 1. c. 24; 1 Eliz. 1. c. 20 Pr.	8 May 1559
An Act to annex to the Crown certain Religious Houses, and to reform certain Abuses in Chantries. (Repealed by Statute Law (Repeals) Act 1989 (c. 43))

=== Private acts ===
Short title	Citation	Royal assent
Long title
Restitution in blood of Lord John Gray.	1 Eliz. 1. c. 1 Pr.	8 May 1559
An Act for the Restitution in Blood of the Lord John Graye.
Restitution in blood of Sir James Croftes.	1 Eliz. 1. c. 2 Pr.	8 May 1559
An Act for the Restitution in Blood of Sir James Croftes, Knight.
Restitution in blood of Sir Henry Gates.	1 Eliz. 1. c. 3 Pr.	8 May 1559
An Act for the Restitution in Blood of Sir Henry Gates, Knight.
Assurance of lands to Lords Wentworth, Ryche and Darcye.	1 Eliz. 1. c. 4 Pr.	8 May 1559
An Act for the Assurance of certain Lands to the Lord Wentworth, Lord Ryche, and Lord Darcye of Chechie.
Wrothe's Naturalization Act 1558	1 Eliz. 1. c. 5 Pr.	8 May 1559
An Act, that Jerosme Wrothe, born in Germany, shall be reputed the Queen's Majesty's Natural Subject born.
Brownes' Estate Act 1558	1 Eliz. 1. c. 6 Pr.	8 May 1559
An Act for the exchanging of the Nature of Gavelkind Land, of the Land of Thomas Browne and George Browne.
Restitution in blood of Robert Rudston.	1 Eliz. 1. c. 7 Pr.	8 May 1559
An Act for the Restitution, in Blood of Robert Rudstone, Esquire.
Reversal of the attainder of Cardinal Pole.	1 Eliz. 1. c. 8 Pr.	8 May 1559
An Act for the Declaration of the Repeal of the Attainder of the late Cardinal Poole.
Trinity Hall Cambridge Act 1558	1 Eliz. 1. c. 9 Pr.	8 May 1559
An Act for the Incorporation of Trinity Hall, in Cambridge.
Duke of Norfolk's marriage ratification and assurance of the Duchess's jointure.	1 Eliz. 1. c. 10 Pr.	8 May 1559
An Act for the Ratification of the Marriage between the Duke of Norff. and Lady Margaret now his Wife, and for the Assurance of certain Lands for her Jointure.
Restitution in blood of Edward Lewkenor's children.	1 Eliz. 1. c. 11 Pr.	8 May 1559
An Act for the Restitution in Blood of the Sons and Daughters of Edward Lewkenor, Esquire.
King's Lynn Fair Revival Act 1558	1 Eliz. 1. c. 12 Pr.	8 May 1559
An Act to revive a Fair in Lynne Regis, in Norff.
Conwil Elvet chapel to be parish church of Abernant (Carmarthenshire).	1 Eliz. 1. c. 13 Pr.	8 May 1559
An Act for the making of a Chapel in Carmerthenshire to be a Parish Church.
Assurances of lands of Bishop of Winchester to Earl of Pembroke, Sir Philip Hobby, Sir John Mason and others.	1 Eliz. 1. c. 14 Pr.	8 May 1559
An Act for the Assurance of Lands, late Parcel of the Bishoprick of Winchester, to divers Patentees of King Edward the Sixth.
Staffordshire Assizes and Sessions: maintenance at Stafford.	1 Eliz. 1. c. 15 Pr.	8 May 1559
An Act for Assizes and Sessions to be holden in the Town of Stafford.
Restitution in blood of Lord Dacres.	1 Eliz. 1. c. 16 Pr.	8 May 1559
An Act for the Restitution in Blood of the Lord Dacres of the South.
Restitution in blood of Henry Howard, Jane Howard and Katherine wife of Lord Berkeley.	1 Eliz. 1. c. 17 Pr.	8 May 1559
An Act for the Restitution in Blood of Henry Howard, Jane Howard, and Katherine Wife to the Lord Barckley.

=== Sources ===
- "1° Eliz.". The Statutes of the Realm. Vol. 4 Part 1: 1547 to 1584. pp. 349–400 – via HathiTrust.
- Pickering, Danby, ed. (1763). "Anno primo Elizabethæ". The Statutes at Large. Vol. 6: from the First Year of Queen Mary to the Thirty-fifth Year of Queen Elizabeth, inclusive. Cambridge: Joseph Bentham. pp. 107–151 – via Internet Archive.
- Pickering, Danby, ed. (1763). "Anno primo Elizabethæ". The Statutes at Large. Vol. 6: from the First Year of Queen Mary to the Thirty-fifth Year of Queen Elizabeth, inclusive. Cambridge: Joseph Bentham. pp. 107–151 – via Internet Archive.
- Journal of the House of Commons. Vol. 1 – 1547-1629. His Majesty's Stationery Office. 1802 – via British History Online.
- Journal of the House of Lords. Vol. 1: 1509-1577. London: His Majesty's Stationery Office. 1830 – via British History Online.
- Chronological Table of and Index to the Statutes. Vol. 1: To the End of the Session 59 Vict. Sess. 2 (1895) (13th ed.). London: Her Majesty's Stationery Office. 1896. pp. 58–59 – via Google Books.
- Chronological Table of the Statutes: Covering the Period from 1235 to the End of 1971. London: Her Majesty's Stationery Office. 1972. p. 56. ISBN 978-0-11-840096-1 – via Google Books.
- "Acts of the English Parliament from 1558". legislation.gov.uk. The National Archives.
- "Chronological Tables of the Private and Personal Acts: Part 1 (1539–1601)". legislation.gov.uk. The National Archives.

== See also ==
- List of acts of the Parliament of England
