= Tet Offensive attack on the United States embassy =

1968 Vietcong military offensive

- Part of The Tet Offensive of the Vietnam War
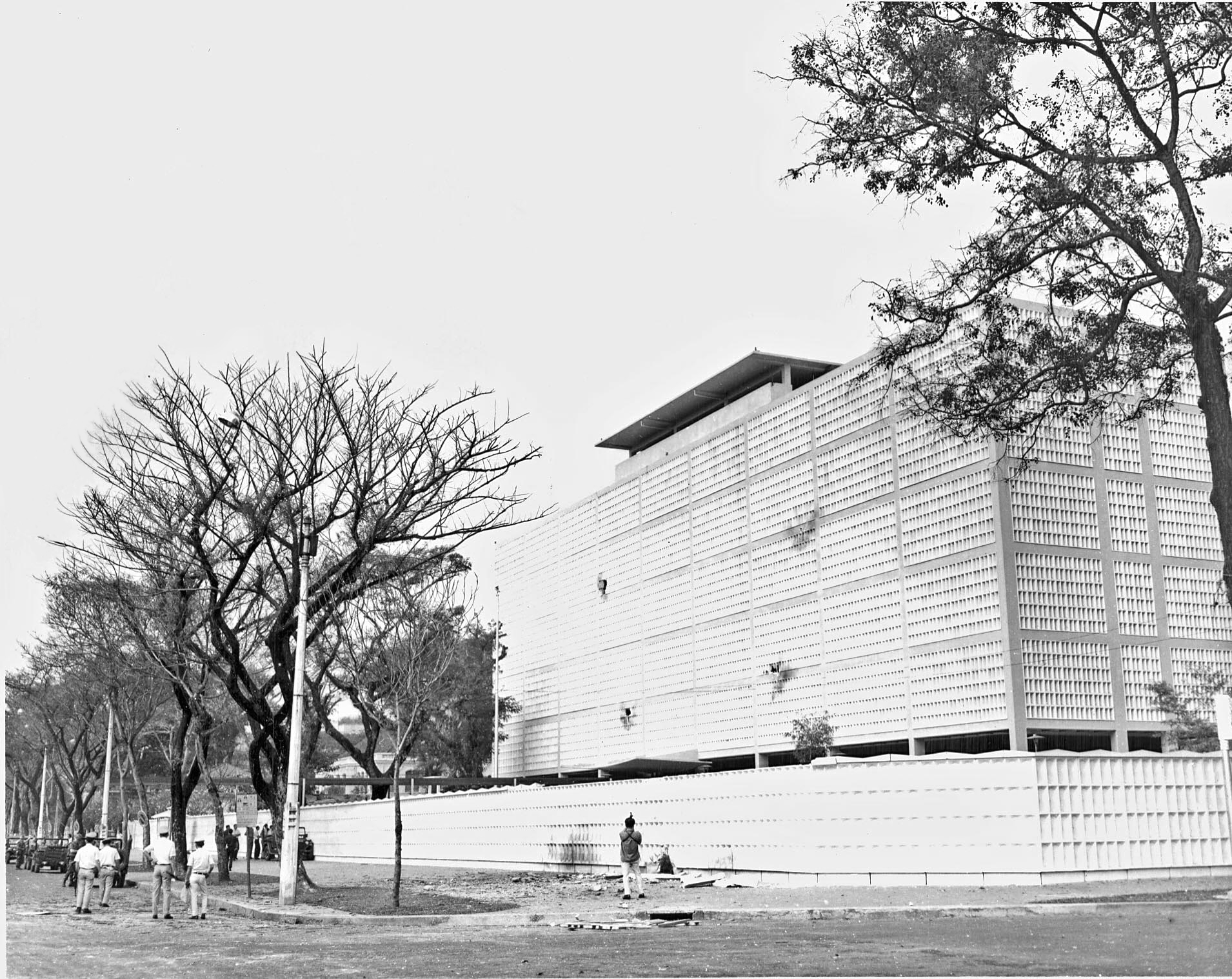
- The embassy after the attack
Date	31 January 1968
Location	Embassy of the United States, Saigon, South Vietnam 10.7833°N 106.7004°E
Result	US military victory Viet Cong propaganda victory

Belligerents
United States	Viet Cong

Commanders and leaders
Lt Col. Gordon D. Rowe; Captain Robert J. O'Brien	Bay Tuyen †; Ut Nho †

Units involved
716th Military Police Battalion; Marine Security Guard Battalion	C-10 Sapper Battalion

Strength
Initially 3 Marine security guards 2 MPs	15 sappers

Casualties and losses
5 killed	12 killed 3 captured

On 31 January 1968, a 15-man Viet Cong (VC) sapper team attempted to seize the embassy of the United States in Saigon, the capital of South Vietnam, at the start of the VC's Tet Offensive. While the VC successfully penetrated the embassy compound, they were unable to enter the chancery building and were pinned down by security forces, with the three survivors eventually surrendering to US forces. Notwithstanding the attack's failure it had a profound political and psychological impact in the United States.

== Background ==
The United States had been providing material support to South Vietnam since its foundation in 1954. The Vietnam War effectively began with the start of the North Vietnamese backed VC insurgency in 1959/60 and the U.S. increased its military aid and advisory support to South Vietnam in response. With the worsening military and political situation in South Vietnam, the U.S. increasingly became directly involved in the conflict. U.S. ground troops were first deployed to South Vietnam in March 1965 and by the end of that year almost 200,000 U.S. military personnel were deployed and were engaging in combat with the VC and the People's Army of Vietnam (PAVN). The growing U.S. presence was matched by North Vietnam and the U.S. and its allies increasingly took over fighting the PAVN/VC main force units from the Army of the Republic of Vietnam (ARVN), relegating them to pacification fighting the war in the villages with the VC. The U.S. strategy was attrition warfare and they conducted hundreds of search and destroy operations to engage the PAVN/VC, but the PAVN/VC were usually able to control the location and timing of engagements to offset U.S. tactical advantages. A number of large, but essentially inconclusive, battles took place throughout 1966 and 1967. By late 1967 Military Assistance Command, Vietnam (MACV) claimed that every statistical indicator of progress showed that its strategy was succeeding. At an address at the National Press Club on 21 November, COMUSMACV General William Westmoreland reported that, as of the end of 1967, the PAVN/VC were "unable to mount a major offensive ... I am absolutely certain that whereas in 1965 the enemy was winning, today he is certainly losing...We have reached an important point when the end begins to come into view."

On 15 December 1967, following the conclusion of Operation Fairfax, as a sign of their confidence in the Vietnamese military, US forces turned over responsibility for the defense of Saigon to the ARVN; henceforth, U.S. forces would only be responsible for defending themselves and their facilities in the city. On the night of 30 January 1968, four Vietnamese police posts provided an outer line of defense for the US Embassy. Two military policemen from the 716th Military Police Battalion part of the 18th Military Police Brigade guarded the vehicle entrance on Mac Dinh Chi Street, inside the chancery building two US Marines of the Marine Security Guard occupied a guard post and, due to the heightened security situation following the cancellation of the Tet Truce, another marine was stationed on the roof of the chancery building.

== Battle ==
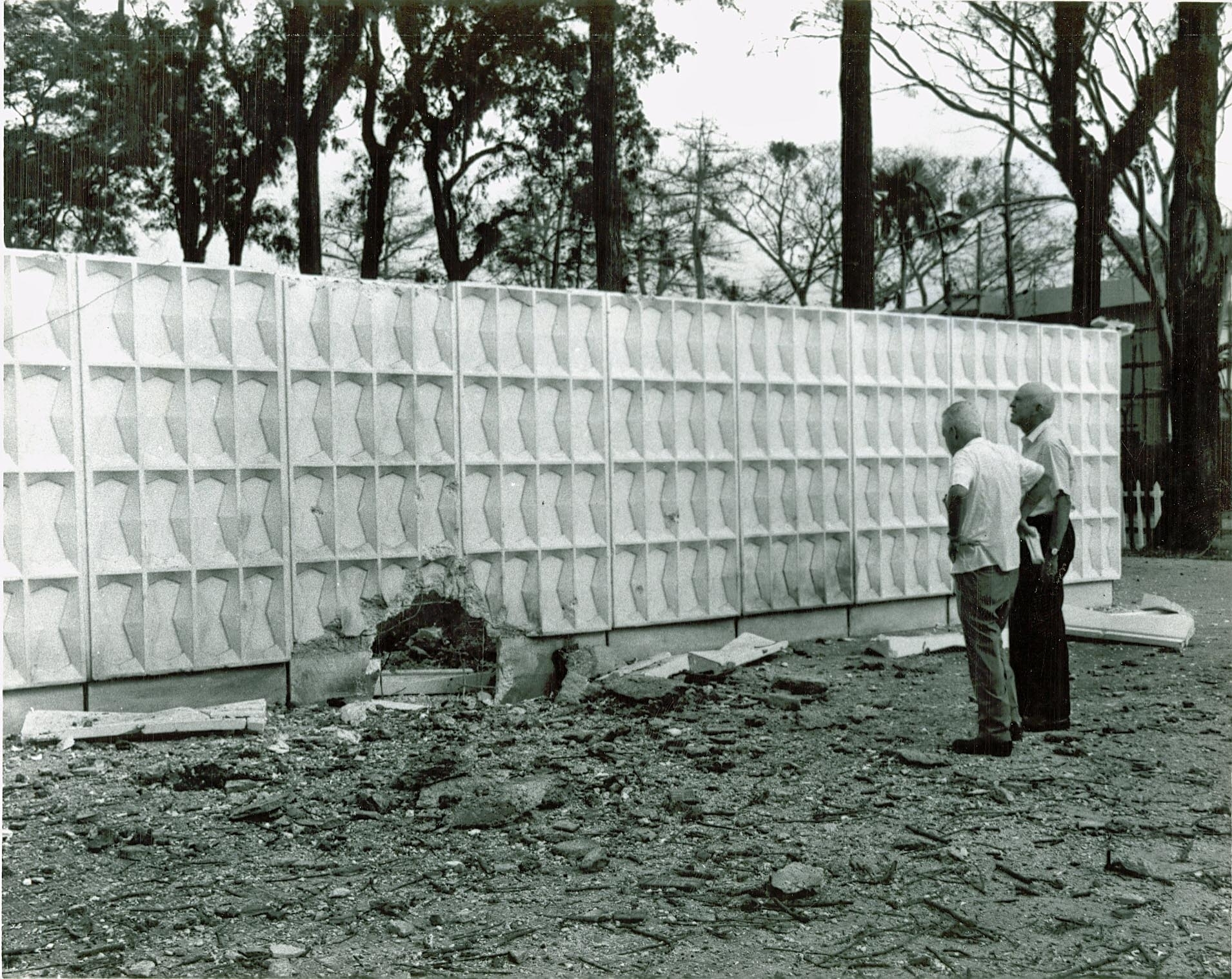
Hole blown in embassy perimeter wall through which the Viet Cong entered the embassy grounds

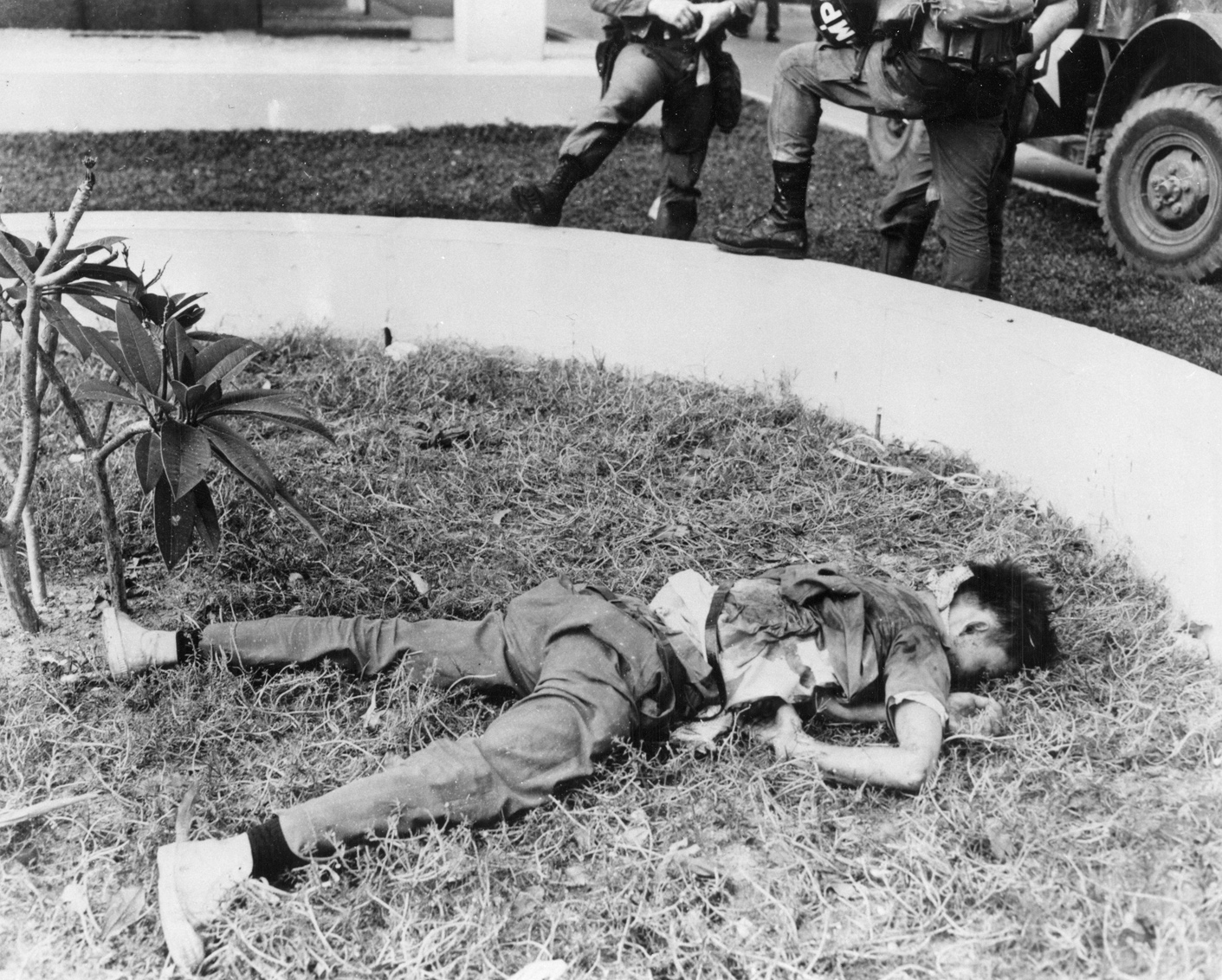
Viet Cong sapper dead in a planter on the embassy grounds

Shortly after midnight on 31 January 1968, 15 VC sappers from the elite C-10 Sapper Battalion gathered at a VC safe house in a car repair shop at 59 Phan Thanh Gian Street to distribute weapons and conduct final preparations for the attack. Two of the sappers were later identified as U.S. Department of State employees. Their orders were to seize the embassy grounds. The sappers had been told by the VC Sub-Region 6 headquarters that hundreds of anti-war and anti-government university students would converge on the embassy that morning to stage a sit-down strike. The sappers also expected one or more local force battalions to relieve them at some point during the next 24 hours.

The unit set off in a small truck and a taxi towards central Saigon. As the vehicles came down Mac Dinh Chi Street with their lights off after curfew, they were spotted by a Vietnamese police guard post north of the embassy, but rather than trying to stop the vehicles, the police instead took cover. As the taxi turned from Mac Dinh Chi Street onto Thong Nhut Boulevard, the occupants opened fire on the two MPs guarding the vehicle gate. The MPs, Specialist Four (SP4) Charles L Daniel and Private First Class William E Sebast, returned fire, closed and locked the steel gate and radioed that they were under attack. Hearing the firing at the side gate, Marine Sergeant Ronald W. Harper, who was in the rear of the embassy compound, ran back through the rear door of the chancery across the lobby past Marine Corporal George B Zahuranic, who was calling for help. Harper pulled a Vietnamese night watchman into the building and closed and bolted the heavy teak doors to the chancery.

Minutes later at 02:47, the VC blew a small hole in the perimeter wall on Thong Nhut Boulevard and gained access to the embassy compound. The first two VC who crawled through the hole were the commander and the deputy commander. The commander was shot and killed and the deputy shot and knocked unconscious by Daniel and Sebast in their guard post at the Mac Dinh Chi Street entrance. Daniel radioed "They're coming in! They're coming in! Help me! Help me!" before the radio went silent. A VC armed with an AK-47 rifle had emerged from the rear parking lot, shooting the two MPs in the back and killing them both. A second man carrying a rifle came around the building and the two men, later determined to be a pair of embassy drivers, joined the other VC soldiers on the front lawn.

On the chancery roof, Marine Sergeant Rudy A. Soto Jr saw the VC coming through the wall and tried to fire on them with his 12-gauge shotgun which jammed after a few rounds. He then emptied his .38 caliber revolver at the hole, but such fire was unlikely to be effective from that height and range. Inside the embassy grounds, the VC opened fire on the chancery building with Type 56 assault rifles and B-40 rocket-propelled grenades (RPGs). Several RPGs penetrated the walls of the chancery, wounding Zahuranic and destroying the two radio sets in the guard post. Soto tried unsuccessfully to contact the lobby guard post and, assuming that Harper and Zahuranic were dead, he called for assistance and waited for the VC to reach him. In the villa at the rear of the embassy compound, Colonel George Jacobson, the Mission Coordinator, was awakened by the firing; searching for a weapon, he found a single M26 grenade.

When Lieutenant colonel Gordon D. Rowe, commanding the 716th MP Battalion, received the distress call from the embassy, he dispatched several jeep patrols to investigate what was happening. The first two patrols took routes that passed by the south vehicle gate of the Independence Palace which was under attack by the VC. As they came up to an unfinished high-rise building, where the VC were sheltering after their initial attack on the Palace had been repulsed, the VC inside destroyed both vehicles in turn, killing two MPs and wounding three. A third jeep patrol reached the embassy without incident, but unaware of the danger, the soldiers pulled up to the embassy's lattice-gate pedestrian entrance on Thong Nhut Boulevard and were gunned down by the VC on the embassy's front lawn, killing Sergeant Johnie B. Thomas and SP4 Owen E. Mebust.

In addition to the three marines, there were two Vietnamese and six American civilians inside the chancery building at the time of the attack. The Americans armed themselves with .38 revolvers, Beretta M12 submachine guns and a shotgun and waited for the VC to come inside.

Outside, in the embassy grounds, the VC were unsure of their next move as the sapper team's leader, had been killed and the deputy knocked out as they entered the embassy grounds. The VC were armed with more than 40 pounds of C-4 explosive and could easily have blasted their way into the chancery had they attempted to do so. Instead they took positions in or near the circular planters in the embassy grounds and returned fire at the growing numbers of Americans shooting at them.

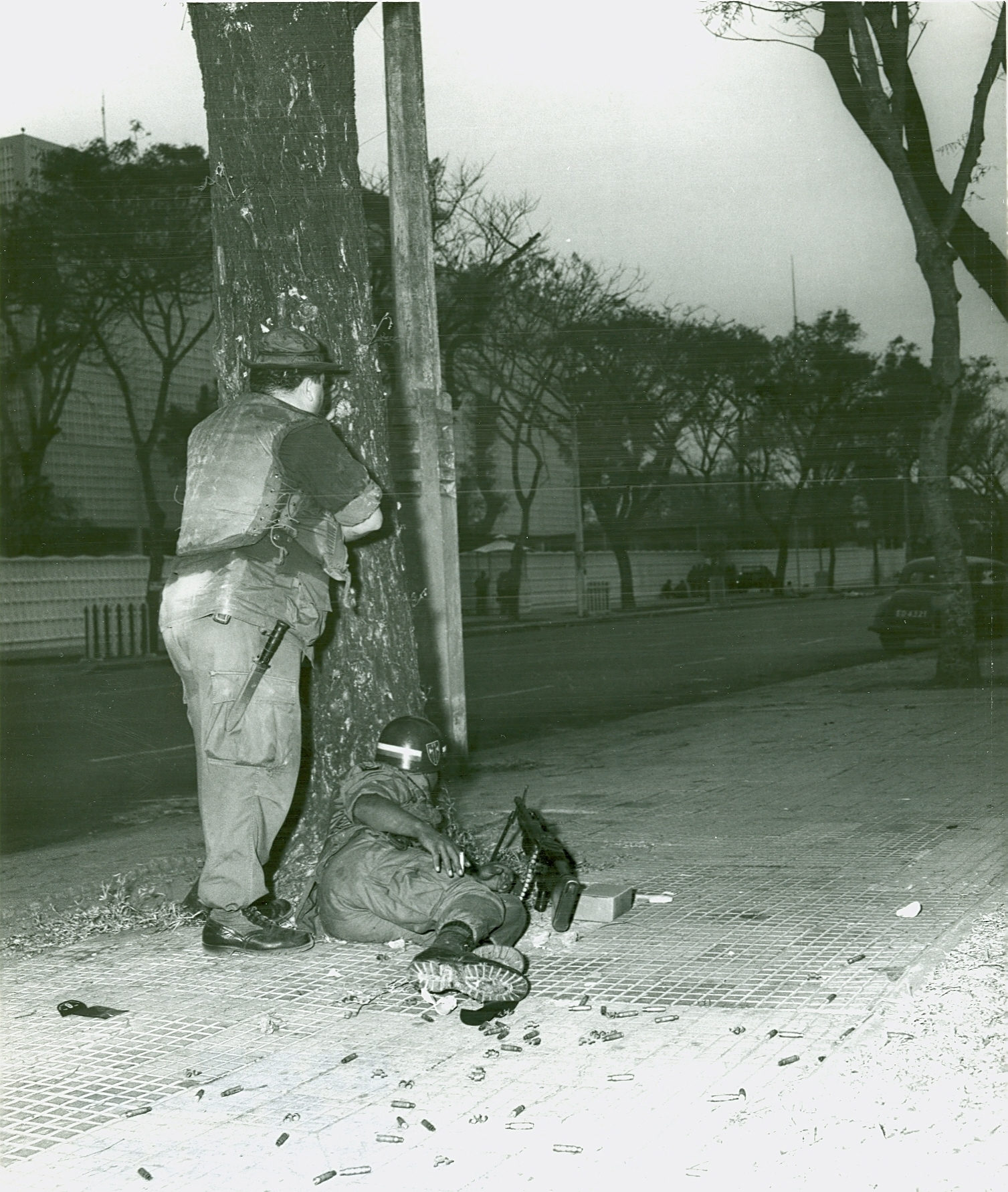
MPs in firing positions on Thong Nhut Boulevard in the early morning

At the Marine Guards' living quarters five blocks from the embassy, Captain Robert J. O'Brien organised the remaining marines of the Marine Security Guard detachment into quick reaction teams and headed to the embassy. As they approached the side gate on Mac Dinh Chi Street, they found it locked and could see VC inside the grounds, calling out to the MPs they were answered with fire from the VC and withdrew to firing positions further down the street and laid fire on the embassy gardens.

At around 04:00, Ambassador Ellsworth Bunker, through an aide, contacted the head of Saigon police, Lieutenant Colonel Nguyen Van Luan, to ask for police reinforcements for the embassy. The First Precinct police commanding officer refused to move his men in the dark and instead asked the Americans to escort his men to the embassy. Around 25 National Policemen, had reported for duty out of 300 on the night of Tết and none of the National Police offered any assistance at the time of the incident nor in the 18-hours after it started.

At 04:20, Westmoreland ordered the 716th MP Battalion to clear the embassy as their first priority. Lacking armored vehicles and helicopters, the MPs moved in more troops to cordon off the embassy. The tactical situation was confused by darkness and the poor communications within the chancery and between the chancery and the MPs and marines outside the embassy compound. Harper and the other Americans inside the chancery could communicate with the outside by telephone, while Soto on the roof only had a radio.

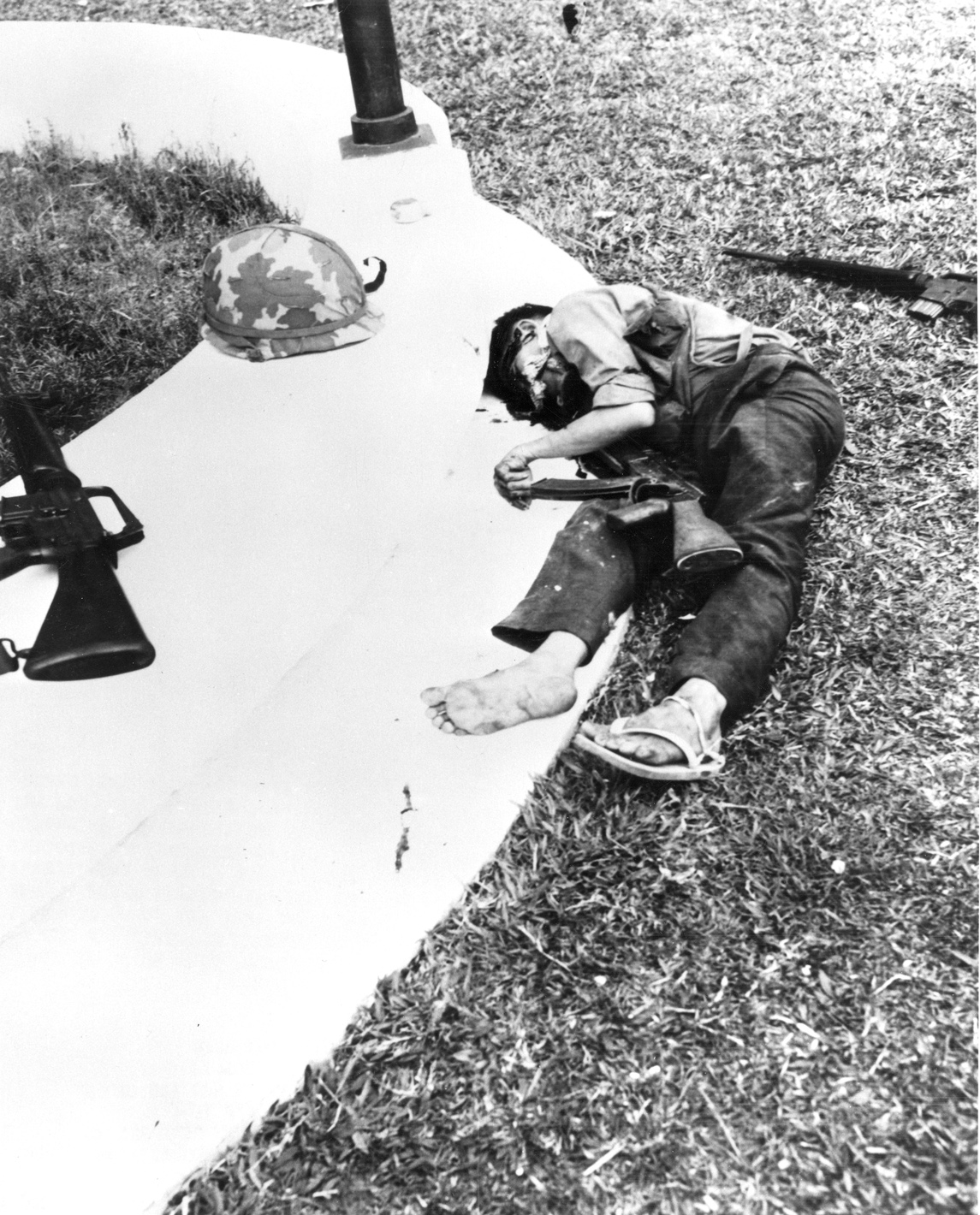
Viet Cong sapper dead on the embassy grounds

Marine Corporal James C. Marshall climbed onto the roof of a small building in the Consular compound and fired on the VC in the embassy compound, until he was hit by a rocket fragment. He remained in place, firing on the VC until he was shot and killed; he was the last American killed at the embassy that day. At 05:00, a helicopter carrying troops from the 101st Airborne Division attempted to land on the rooftop helipad but was driven off by fire from the surviving VC in the embassy grounds. At 06:15, a Medevac helicopter landed on the roof, picked up Zahuranic, and dropped off three cases of M16 rifle ammunition. However, none of the Americans in the chancery had an M16 and so this resupply was useless.

As dawn broke on the morning of 31 January, the hole that the VC had blown in the wall to gain access to the embassy compound was located. At the same time, MPs had finally managed to shoot the locks off the front gate on Thong Nhut Boulevard and rammed the gates open with a jeep. The MPs and marines charged through the open gate into the embassy grounds, while a second team stormed the rear parking lot. Within a few minutes, they had killed all of the few surviving VC, as most of them were already dead or dying in the embassy garden from the prolonged firefight. At the same time, a helicopter carrying troops from the 101st Airborne Division landed on the roof and proceeded to sweep the chancery building, finding no VC inside.

In his villa, Colonel Jacobson heard movement downstairs; he threw down his grenade and called out to the MPs in the grounds to throw him up a weapon. The MPs threw up an M1911 Colt pistol and a gas mask to Jacobson, CS gas grenades were then thrown by the MPs through the ground floor windows and Jacobson proceeded to shoot a wounded VC as he came upstairs.

By 09:00, the embassy was declared secure. At 09:15 General Westmoreland and his security detail arrived by car to inspect the embassy while Ambassador Bunker ordered the building reopened for business later that afternoon.

== Aftermath ==
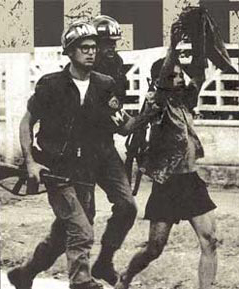
MPs escort a Viet Cong captive away from the embassy.

Of the 15 VC that attacked the building, 12 had been killed and three captured. US losses were four MPs and one marine killed.

The first news reports of the embassy attack were sent by the Associated Press at 03:15 based on fragmentary information, a later report stated that three VC had entered the embassy grounds. The news reports from the embassy reflected the confused tactical situation. At 07:25, the Associated Press carried a story stating that the VC had seized part of the first floor of the chancery building and that US forces were being held back by fire from the chancery building. This report was picked up by NBC news who, on the 18:30 EST (06:30 ICT) Huntley–Brinkley Report, broadcast that the VC occupied the first floor of the chancery building and that US forces were in the embassy grounds exchanging fire with them. Later news reports corrected the facts of the attack, but the initial reports had shocked the American public.

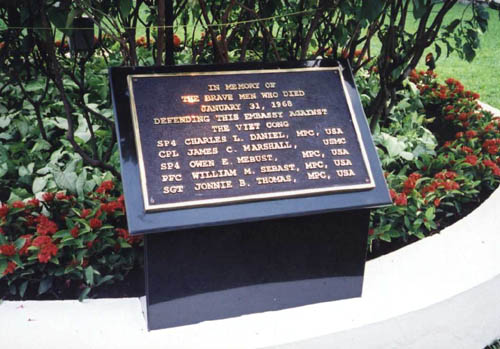
Plaque commemorating MPs and marine who died defending the embassy

While the embassy attack (like much of the Tet offensive) was tactically insignificant, it had a profound political and psychological impact. The United States had been fighting in Vietnam for over two and a half years, 20,000 Americans had been killed and despite the presence of nearly 500,000 U.S. troops in Vietnam, the Viet Cong had managed to penetrate the US Embassy.

On 4 November 1968, Ambassador Bunker presented a scroll of appreciation to Lieutenant Colonel Tyler H. Fletcher, Commanding Officer of the 716th MP Battalion, for their role in defending the embassy. Bunker also dedicated a plaque in the chancery lobby commemorating the four MPs and one marine who died defending the embassy.

On 17 March 1969, the 716th MP Battalion and attached units were awarded the Presidential Unit Citation for their actions in the defense of Saigon from 31 January to 10 February 1968.

== See also ==
- 1965 United States embassy bombing in Saigon
- Tet offensive battle of Cholon and Phu Tho Racetrack
- Tet offensive attack on Joint General Staff Compound
