= Sidney Faithorn Green =

English Anglo-Catholic Priest (1841–1916)

Sidney Faithorn Green (1841–1916) was an English clergyman who, during the Ritualist controversies in the Church of England, was imprisoned for 20 months for liturgical practice contrary to the Public Worship Regulation Act 1874.

== Background ==
Sidney Faithorn Green was born in Kent in 1841. He studied at Tonbridge School and Trinity College, Cambridge. Green was ordained a priest of the Church of England in Manchester in 1866, and served as a curate in Swinton until his appointment as incumbent of St John the Evangelist, Miles Platting, Manchester. He was a follower of the Oxford Movement who celebrated the Eucharist in the style of Anglo-Catholicism, see Anglican Eucharistic theology.

== Timeline of the ritual controversy at Miles Platting ==
- June 1869: Green is appointed incumbent of St John's, Miles Platting, Manchester.
- January 1871: Green is admonished by Bishop of Manchester James Fraser for mixing water with wine in the service of Holy Communion. Green agrees to abandon the practice.
- 1874: Green nominates Rev. Harry Cowgill as his curate but Fraser refuses to approve the nomination on the grounds of Cowgill's avowed refusal to accept the authority of the Judicial Committee of the Privy Council in church matters.
- May 1877, Fraser learns that Green is using incense and unlawful vestments, perceived as trappings of Anglo-Catholicism, in his services. Green is again admonished and agrees to abandon the practice.
- 18 May 1878: Fraser receives a petition purporting to be from 320 of Green's parishioners accusing him of "propagation of false doctrine and deadly error".
- 20 May 1878: Fraser responds coolly, pointing out the vagueness of the accusations and the similarity of the handwriting in many of the "signatures".
- 2 December 1878: The Church Association takes up the case and Fraser receives a "presentation" against Green charging, contrary to the Public Worship Regulation Act 1874:
  1. The mixing of wine and water.
  2. Lighted candles.
  3. Unlawful vestments.
  4. Kneeling during the prayer of consecration.
  5. Elevating the paten and chalice.
  6. Placing the alms on the credence instead of allowing them to lie on the Holy Table.
  7. Using the sign of the cross towards the congregation.
  8. Performing the consecration in such a manner that the congregation could not see him break the bread or take the chalice in his hand.
  9. Unlawfully and ceremoniously raising the chalice.
  10. Unlawfully displaying a large brass cross.
  11. Displaying a baldacchino.
- 3 December 1878: At an interview with Fraser, Green declines to submit to his authority on liturgical matters as "I should deny my Lord and imperil (peril?) my own salvation." Fraser declines to invoke his discretion to stay proceedings under the Act.
- 23 December 1878: Fraser receives a petition supporting Green but is unimpressed by the standing of the signatories.
- 14 June 1879: The case is tried before James Plaisted Wilde, Baron Penzance who upholds the charges.
- 9 August 1879: A monition is issued to Green prohibiting the practices complained of. Green persists and an order is made inhibiting him from exercising the cure of souls. Green persists and is held to be in contempt of court.
- 25 November 1879: Lord Penzance issues a significavit to the Court of Chancery of the county palatine of Lancaster notifying Green's contempt.
- 9 March 1880: The court issues the writ de contumace capiendo.
- 19 March 1880: Green is arrested and held in Lancaster Castle. Cowgill, without the bishop's licence, takes Green's place at Miles Platting but Fraser takes no action for fear of inflaming the situation.
- 24 July 1880: An application is made to Lord Penzance for a ruling that Green is in contempt for non-payment of costs of £293 7s 8d.
- 22 October 1880: An order for the sequestration of his property is served on Green.
- March 1881: An application is made to the Lord Chancellor, Roundell Palmer, 1st Earl of Selborne, to take possession of Green's effects. The application is opposed.
- 2 April 1881: The application is heard but Selborne defers his decision because of an impending challenge to the Queen's Bench related to Lord Penzance's action.
- 6 April 1881: An application for a writ of habeas corpus is dismissed by the Queen's Bench.
- 12 April 1881: An appeal is dismissed by Lords Brett and Cotton.
- 7 May 1881: Selborne denounces the costs awarded against Green as a "great scandal".
- 20 May 1881: Selborne reluctantly orders the sale of Green's effects.
- 21 May 1881: The English Church Union obtain a legal opinion from Sir John Holker and E. Vaughan Williams favouring an appeal by Green and implore him to do so.
- 3–4 August 1881: An appeal to the House of Lords is heard by Selborne, Lord Blackburn and Lord Watson. It is dismissed.
- 4 August 1881: Green's effects are sold to defray the costs of the Church Association.
- 21 September 1881: Fraser finally obtains an, at least nominal, undertaking from Green to obey his bishop's direction. Fraser writes to prime minister William Ewart Gladstone requesting that he petition Queen Victoria to exercise her Royal Prerogative to pardon Green. The case is forwarded to the Lord Chancellor, Earl Selborne, and Home Secretary, Sir William Vernon Harcourt.
- 25 October 1881: Green writes to Fraser emphasising that his submission to episcopal authority will not extend to disobedience to his conscience in liturgical matters.
- 31 October 1881: Fraser writes to Gladstone to withdraw his petition for a pardon.
- January 1882: A Mr. Leeds starts to assist Cowgill, who is suffering from anxiety and fatigue, at Miles Platting. Fraser takes no action despite Leeds' unlicensed status.
- August 1882: Selborne writes to Fraser to advise him that, three years having elapsed since the inhibition, Green's living at Miles Platting has lapsed under the Act. Green's detention now seems to serve little purpose but he was imprisoned for contempt and there is no trivial remedy. It seems unlikely that either Green or the Church Association will apply to the court for release but Fraser has no locus standi.
- 17 October 1882: Fraser writes to Selborne advising him that Green is being guided by the English Church Union who regard deprivation of living under the Act with no greater gravity than any of its other provisions.
- 20 October 1882: Fraser consults with his Chancellor, Richard Copley Christie, and writes to Selborne advising him of his resolve to free Green despite his fears for the consequences.
- 4 November 1882: Fraser applies to Penzance for Green's release. The motion is unopposed, succeeds and Green is released that day. Green resigns his living in an attempt to deny the state's sequestration of his office. However, sequestration is already complete and Rev. W.R. Pym has been appointed as locum.

== Later life ==
In 1883, Green was appointed to a curacy at St John's, Kensington and then in 1889 as rector of Charlton by Dover, an avowedly ritualist parish of which Keble College, Oxford was patron. He became Rector of Luddenham with Stone in Kent in 1914 but soon retired due to ill health. He died in Sydenham on 11 August 1916.

== Bibliography ==
- Bentley, J. (1987). Ritualism and Politics in Victorian Britain: The Attempt to Legislate for Belief. ISBN 0-19-826714-2.
- Diggle, J.W. (1890). The Lancashire Life of Bishop Fraser. pp. 398–419.
- Roberts, Rev. G. Bayfield (1895). The History of the English Church Union 1859-1894. London: Church Printing – via Project Canterbury.
- Yates, N. (1999). Anglican Ritualism in Victorian Britain, 1830-1910. Oxford: University Press. pp. 262–265. ISBN 0-19-826989-7.
