= Neutralism =

Neutralism may refer to:

== Biology ==
- Neutral theory of molecular evolution
- Biological interaction § Neutralism

== Politics ==
- Neutral country
- Nonalignment (disambiguation)
