= Neutral powers during World War II =

States which did not participate in World War II

The neutral powers were countries that remained neutral during World War II. Some of these countries had large colonies abroad or had great economic power. Spain had just been through its civil war, which ended on 1 April 1939 (five months prior to the invasion of Poland)—a war that involved several countries that subsequently participated in World War II.

During World War II, the neutral powers took no official side, hoping to avoid attack. However, Portugal, Sweden, and Switzerland all helped the Allies by supplying "voluntary" brigades to the United Kingdom, while Spain avoided the Allies in favor of the Axis, supplying them with its own voluntary brigade, the Blue Division. Ireland generally favoured the Allied side, as with the United States. The United States remained officially neutral until 8 December 1941, a day following the attack by Japan on Pearl Harbor.

The Lateran Treaty between Italy and the Holy See, signed in 1929, required that the Pope maintain "perpetual neutrality in international relations". Accordingly, Vatican City was officially neutral throughout the war.

Several countries suffered invasions despite their efforts to be neutral. These included Nazi Germany's invasion of Denmark and Norway on 9 April 1940—then Belgium, the Netherlands, and Luxembourg on 10 May 1940. On the same day, 10 May 1940, the British, having already invaded the Faroe Islands in April, invaded Iceland and established an occupying force (subsequently replaced by the then-neutral United States). The Soviet Union invaded Lithuania on 15 June 1940 and Latvia and Estonia on 17 June. In the Balkans, the Italo-Greek War began on 28 October 1940 and Yugoslavia was invaded in April 1941. Iran was also attacked and occupied by Britain and the Soviet Union in August 1941 and later declared war on Nazi Germany.

See also the histories of Afghanistan, Andorra, Guatemala, Liechtenstein, Saudi Arabia and Yemen during this period.

== Neutral powers ==
=== Europe ===
==== Ireland ====
- Ireland (Éire) — The policy of Irish neutrality during World War II was adopted by the Oireachtas (parliament) at the instigation of Éamon de Valera, the Taoiseach (prime minister) upon the outbreak of hostilities in Europe. It was maintained throughout the conflict, in spite of several German air raids and attacks on Ireland's shipping fleet by the Axis. De Valera refrained from joining either side, although he generally favored and aided the Allied powers by allowing access to their naval repair yards, as well as passing intelligence to the British and allowing Allied aircrews who crashed in Ireland to be moved to Northern Ireland, which was (and still is) part of the United Kingdom (German airmen were interned for the duration of the war). It is also notable that some members of the Irish Republican Army (IRA), an Irish republican paramilitary group which was opposed to the Irish state, attempted to collaborate with Nazi Germany against Britain, but their efforts were ultimately unsuccessful.

==== Portugal ====
- Portugal — Portugal was officially neutral during World War II. However, it maintained a close relationship with the UK, due to the alliance it had for the last 600 years, which is the longest-lasting military alliance in history. The Estado Novo sought neutrality in order to keep Spain neutral and prevent it from joining the Axis. Portugal allowed the United States to use a secret military base at Santa Maria Airport in the Azores through a military agreement signed on 28 November 1944. This violated its neutrality and rendered Portugal as a non-belligerent on the Allied side.

Colonies of Portugal:

- (Portugal) Angola
- (Portugal) Cape Verde
- (Portugal) Portuguese Guinea
- (Portugal) Portuguese India
- (Portugal) Macau
- (Portugal) Mozambique
- (Portugal) Fort of São João Baptista de Ajudá
- (Portugal) São Tomé and Príncipe
- (Portugal) Portuguese Timor (Occupied by Japan from 1942 to 1945)

==== Spain ====
Meeting at Hendaye between Franco and Hitler in October 1940

- Spain — Spain initially held to formal neutrality, but when Italy entered the war in June 1940, Francisco Franco changed Spain's status to that of "non-belligerent" and proceeded to occupy Tangiers. From June 1940 until February 1941, the Francoist regime was greatly tempted by interventionism; a prominent Germanophile, Foreign Minister Ramón Serrano Suñer was highly influential in the government. However, meetings with German officials, including the Hendaye meeting between Franco and Hitler on 23 October 1940, did not bring formal entry of Spain into the war.

In mid-June 1940, Spain took advantage of the Battle of France to send 4,000 Moroccan soldiers into Tangier International Zone, which was occupied by Spain until 1945; an excuse given was that there was a fear that Italy might seize the city.

Operation Barbarossa shifted the main theater of war away from the Mediterranean, lessening Spain's interest in intervention. The less-relevant Serrano Suñer was still able to create the Blue Division, made up of Spanish volunteers to fight for the Axis. With the conflict decidedly turning in favor of the Allies, Franco returned the status of Spain to one of "vigilant neutrality" on 1 October 1943.

During most of the war, Spain had been a key provider of strategic tungsten ore to Nazi Germany. Amid heavy Allied diplomatic and economic pressure, Spain signed a secret deal with the United States and United Kingdom on 2 May 1944 to drastically limit tungsten exports to Germany and expel German spies from Spanish soil.

Colonies of Spain:

- (Spain) Ifni
- (Spain) Spanish Sahara
- Spanish Guinea
- Spanish protectorate in Morocco
  - Tangier

==== Sweden ====
- Sweden — Before the war, Sweden and the other Nordic countries announced their planned neutrality in any large European conflict. When Finland was invaded by the Soviet Union in the Winter War, Sweden changed its position to that of a non-belligerent, which was not defined by international treaties, thus freeing Sweden from the restrictions of neutrality. Among other things, it allowed the Swedish government to support Finland during the Winter War, allowed German soldiers on leave to travel through Sweden, and at one point allowed a combat division to travel from Norway to Finland through Sweden. The transit of German troops through Finland and Sweden and Swedish iron-ore mining during World War II helped the German war effort. Sweden had disarmed after World War I and was in no position to resist German threats militarily by 1940.

In 1943, the Swedish Armed Forces were much improved, and all such deals with Germany were terminated. Hitler considered invading Sweden, but when Göring protested, Hitler dropped the plan. The Swedish SKF company supplied the majority of ball-bearings used in Germany and was also important to Allied aircraft production.

Swedish Intelligence cracked the German Geheimschreiber cipher and shared decrypted information with the Allies. Stalin was informed well in advance of Hitler's planned invasion of the Soviet Union but chose not to believe the information.

Danish resistance worked with Sweden to carry out the 1943 rescue of the Danish Jews by shipping them to Sweden. During the Liberation of Finnmark, Sweden sent Norwegian "police" troops over the border to link up with Allied forces. At the end of the war, Sweden was preparing to join the Allied invasion of Norway and Denmark if the occupying Wehrmacht forces rejected a general armistice.

==== Switzerland ====
- Switzerland — As in World War I, Switzerland maintained its historic neutrality. It depended on German coal, with 10 million tons imported during the war, comprising 41% of Swiss energy supplies.

The Nazis looted the assets of their victims (including those in concentration camps) to accumulate wealth. In 1998, a Swiss commission estimated that the Swiss National Bank held $440 million ($8 billion in 2020 currency) of Nazi gold, over half of which is believed to have been looted. It is estimated that nearly 91 tonnes (100 short tons) of Nazi gold were laundered through Swiss banks, with only 3.6 tonnes (4 short tons) being returned at the end of the war.

The Swiss military often opened fire on Axis bombers invading its airspace; Switzerland also shot down Allied planes over its territory on several occasions. Throughout the war, cities in Switzerland were accidentally bombed by both Axis and Allied aircraft. The Axis did have plans for an invasion of Switzerland, but Switzerland had formed complex fortifications and amassed thousands of soldiers in the mountains to thwart any Axis invasion.

==== Microstates ====
- Andorra remained neutral throughout World War II.
- Liechtenstein remained neutral throughout World War II. At the same time, Liechtenstein tied itself as closely as possible to Switzerland during the war in hopes of retaining the country's neutrality. Just before the end of the war, Franz Joseph II granted political asylum to First Russian National Army pro-Axis pro-emperor Vladimir White emigres led by General Boris Smyslovsky, who were being cared for by the Liechtenstein Red Cross. Liechtenstein refused to repatriate the Russians to the Soviet Union despite diplomatic pressure, being the only country to not do so.
- Vatican City remained neutral throughout World War II.

=== Asia ===
==== Afghanistan ====
- Afghanistan remained neutral throughout World War II.

==== Bhutan ====
- Bhutan remained neutral throughout World War II.

==== Tibet ====
- Tibet remained neutral throughout World War II. While de facto independent and under the rule of the Dalai Lama, it was internationally recognized as a province of the Republic of China. The Tibetan government received Allied (British and American) military officers in Lhasa in 1943. Following the end of World War II and the defeat of the Nationalists by the Communists in the Chinese Civil War, Tibet was invaded and annexed by the People's Republic of China in 1951.

==== Kingdom of Yemen ====
- Yemen remained neutral throughout World War II. (This country only accounts for the western part of modern Yemen; the rest of the region was part of the British-ruled Aden Protectorate).

== Officially neutral, but still participated ==
=== Europe ===
==== Estonia, Latvia, and Lithuania ====
- The Baltic states of Estonia, Latvia, and Lithuania jointly declared their neutrality on 18 November 1938, in Riga, at the Conference of Baltic Foreign Ministers, with their respective parliaments passing neutrality laws later that year. Despite that, all of them were occupied by the Soviet Union and later Nazi Germany.

==== Iceland ====
- Iceland — Occupied by Allied forces from May 1940.

==== Turkey ====
- Turkey was neutral until February 1945, at which point it joined the Allies. Prior to the outbreak of war, Turkey signed a Mutual Aid Pact with France and Britain in 1939. After the German invasion of France, however, Turkey remained neutral, relying on a clause excusing them if military action might bring conflict with the USSR. In June 1941, after neighbouring Bulgaria joined the Axis and allowed Germany to move troops through to invade Yugoslavia and Greece, Turkey signed a treaty of friendship with Germany. Winston Churchill and his military staff met the Turkish president on 30 January 1943 in the Adana Conference, although Turkey did not then change its position.

Turkey was an important producer of chromite, a strategic material for metallurgy to which Germany had limited access. The Germans wanted it, and the Allies wanted to prevent them from getting it. So, chromite was the key issue in Turkey's negotiations with both sides. Turkey would backpedal on its agreement to supply Nazi Germany with chromite. After instead selling it to the rival nations the United States and the United Kingdom after the two allied nations agreed to also purchase dried fruit and tobacco from Turkey as well. Turkey halted its sales to Germany in April 1944 and broke off relations in August. In February 1945, after the Allies made its invitation to the inaugural meeting of the United Nations (along with the invitations of several other nations) conditional on full belligerency, Turkey declared war on the Axis powers, but no Turkish troops ever saw combat.

==== Microstates ====
- Monaco was occupied by Italy and later by Germany.
- San Marino was briefly occupied by Germany on 17–20 September 1944, during which the Battle of San Marino drove them out. The occupation led the microstate to declare war on Germany on 21 September 1944. Earlier, on 26 June, 1944, the San Marino rail line was bombed by the British in the mistaken belief that the Germans were using it to transport weapons.

=== Asia ===
==== Iran ====
- Iran — In order to be safe from the Allied forces, it officially declared neutrality, but this strategic decision did not last and Iran was later occupied by the Allies (see Anglo-Soviet invasion of Iran). Later, in 1943 — Iran declared war on Germany, however no Iranian troops saw combat but several Iranians joined Nazi Germany Wehrmacht's Freiwilligen-Stamm-Division for anti-partisan operations against the French Resistance.

==== Saudi Arabia ====
- Saudi Arabia severed diplomatic contacts with Germany on 11 September 1939, and with Japan in October 1941. Although officially neutral, the Saudis provided the Allies with large supplies of oil. Diplomatic relations with the United States were established in 1943. King Abdul Aziz Al-Saud was a personal friend of Franklin D. Roosevelt. The Americans were then allowed to build an air force base near Dhahran. Saudi Arabia declared war on Germany on 28 February 1945 and Japan on 1 April 1945, but no military actions resulted from the declaration.

=== Americas ===
==== Argentina ====
- Argentina — Before the start of World War II in 1939, Argentina had maintained a long tradition of neutrality regarding European wars, which had been upheld and defended by all major political parties since the 19th century. One of the main reasons for this policy was related to Argentina's economic position as one of the world's leading exporters of foodstuffs and agricultural products, to Europe in general and to the United Kingdom in particular. Thus, initially, even though the government of Argentina was sympathetic to the Allies and provided economic assistance to the United Kingdom, the country's political tradition of neutralism prevailed. Following the Japanese attack on Pearl Harbor and the subsequent American declaration of war upon Japan, American pressure for Argentine entry into the war begun to increase. Relations worsened further following a military coup in 1943, as the plotters were accused of holding Axis sympathies. Because of strong divisions and internal disputes between members of the Argentine military, the country would continue to remain neutral, even after American sanctions. However, Argentina eventually gave in to the Allies' pressure, broke relations with the Axis powers on January 26, 1944, and declared war on March 27, 1945. Over 4,000 Argentine volunteers fought on the Allied side.

==== United States ====
- United States — The United States remained neutral at the outbreak of World War II in compliance with the Neutrality Act of 1936 despite favoring the Allied side. However, the sudden defeat of France by Nazi Germany in the spring of 1940 led the country to significantly expand its armed forces through the Selective Training and Service Act of 1940. On 29 December of that year, President Franklin D. Roosevelt declared that the United States was to be the "Arsenal of Democracy" for the Allies by giving them supplies while the country remained neutral. The U.S. remained neutral until 8 December 1941, when it declared war on Japan in response to the surprise attack on Pearl Harbor the previous day.

=== Africa ===
==== Egypt ====
Egypt achieved de jure independence in 1922. In practice, it remained effectively subject to British control through the Anglo-Egyptian treaty of 1936 which allowed a large British force to remain in the country. Egypt also shared control in the Anglo-Egyptian Sudan. The government of Aly Maher Pasha refused to declare war in 1939 even though Egypt would for much of the war remain a strategic staging-ground for British forces involved in the Western Desert campaign. The Battle of El Alamein took place on Egyptian territory.

==== Liberia ====
Liberia remained neutral until 1944, at which point it joined the Allies, although became increasingly dominated economically and politically by the United States.

== Conclusion ==
Portugal, Spain, Sweden, and Switzerland held to the concept of armed neutrality, and continuously amassed soldiers to defend their nation's sovereignty from potential invasion. Thus, they maintained the right to become belligerent if attacked while in a state of neutrality. The concept of neutrality in war is narrowly defined and puts specific constraints on the neutral party in return for the internationally recognized right to remain neutral. A wider concept is that of non-belligerence. The basic treaty covering Neutral states is Convention V of The Hague Respecting the Rights and Duties of Neutral Powers and Persons in Case of War on Land (1907). A neutral country takes no side in a war between other parties, and in return hopes to avoid being attacked by either of them. A neutralist policy aims at neutrality in case of an armed conflict that could involve the party in question. A neutralist is an advocate of neutrality in international affairs. The concept of neutrality in conflicts is distinct from non-alignment, i.e., the willful desistance from military alliances in order to preserve neutrality in case of war, and perhaps with the hope of preventing a war altogether.

In a study of Spain, Switzerland, and Sweden during the Second World War, Eric Golson found that they engaged in economic realpolitik, as they traded with both the Axis and the Allied Powers.

== See also ==
- Participants in World War II
- Allies of World War II
- Axis powers
- Declarations of war during World War II
- Latin America during World War II
- Neutral country
