= Monitory =

Monitory may refer to:

- Monition
- Monitory Democracy
