= Rebuke =

Censure of a member of the clergy

In English law and the canon law of the Church of England, a rebuke is a censure on a member of the clergy. It is the least severe censure available against clergy of the Church of England, less severe than a monition. A rebuke can be given in person by a bishop or by an ecclesiastical court.

In the Church of Scotland a rebuke was necessary for moral offenders to "purge their scandal". This involved standing or sitting before the congregation for up to three Sundays and enduring a rant by the minister. There was sometimes a special repentance stool near the pulpit for this purpose. In a few places the subject was expected to wear sackcloth. From the 1770s private rebukes were increasingly administered by the kirk session, particularly for men from the social elites, while until the 1820s the poor were almost always given a public rebuke.

Reproof was historically a censure available before culminating in a rebuke.
