= Nonalignment =

Non-aligned may refer to:

- Non-Aligned Movement, movement of states considering themselves not formally aligned with or against any major power bloc
- Non-belligerent, in a war
- Neutrality (international relations), in a war: more restrictive than non-alignment
- Independent (politician)
- A lack of AI alignment
