= 716th Military Police Battalion =

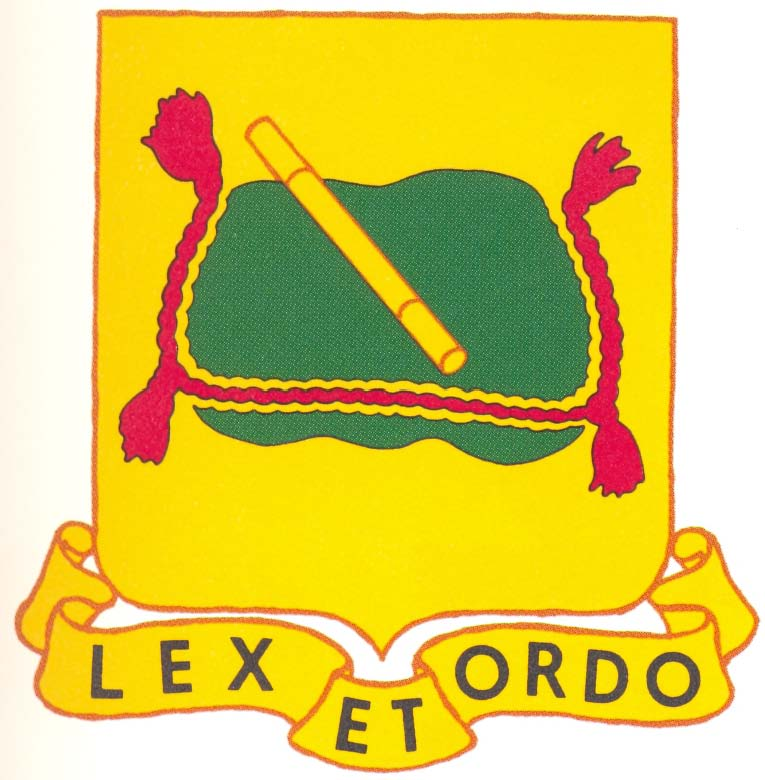
- Unit insignia
- Active: 10 January 1942–present
- Country: United States
- Branch: Active duty
- Type: Military Police
- Size: Battalion
- Part of: 101st Airborne Division (Air Assault)
- Garrison/HQ: Fort Campbell, Kentucky
- Nicknames: "Peacekeepers" "Saigon Warriors"
- Engagements: World War II; Vietnam War; Gulf War; Iraq War; War in Afghanistan

Commanders
- Current commander: LTC Nicole M. Griffith
- Command Sergeant Major: CSM Kasey W. Trapp
- Notable commanders: LTC Gordon D. Rowe

The 716th Military Police Battalion is a military police battalion of the United States Army based at Fort Campbell, Kentucky. It is a subordinate unit of 101st Airborne Division (Air Assault).

== Organization ==
The battalion is subordinate to the 101st Airborne Division (Air Assault) and receives Training and Readiness Oversight from the 16th Military Police Brigade. It is headquartered at Fort Campbell, Kentucky.

== History ==
=== World War II ===
Constituted on 10 January 1942 in the Army as the 716th Military Police Battalion, it was activated during the Second World War at Fort Wadsworth, New York on 15 January 1942.

=== 1950s and 1960s ===
In September 1962 the battalion, then based at Fort Dix, Trenton, New Jersey, was deployed together with the 5th and 17th Field Hospitals, a public information section and a composite intelligence detachment as Task Force Charlie, part of the Federal military forces deployed to support the enrollment of James Meredith at the segregated University of Mississippi. Arriving at the university on the morning of 1 October the battalion was used to secure the campus in the aftermath of the overnight rioting. A company from the battalion would remain deployed at the university until 23 July 1963.

=== Vietnam War ===
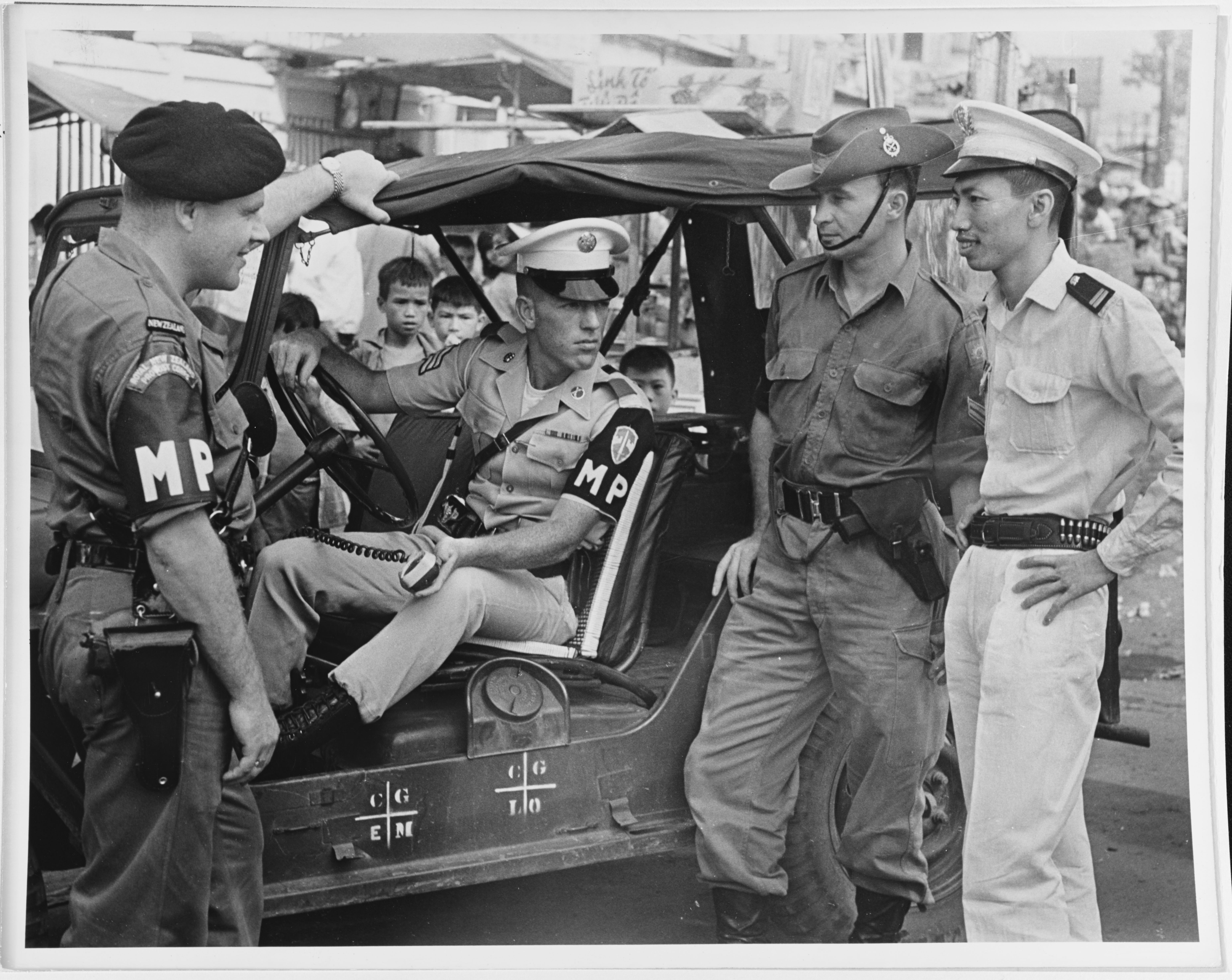
International MP patrol, Saigon, October 1965

In March 1965 the 400-man battalion arrived in Saigon, South Vietnam.

Company C, 52nd Infantry Regiment arrived in South Vietnam on 1 December 1966 and was assigned to the battalion.

By late 1967 the battalion's mission was security and law enforcement in the Saigon/Cholon/Tan Son Nhut metropolitan area, South Vietnam. Specific security missions, involving approximately 83% of the military police/security guard resources of the battalion, included the US Embassy, the Military Assistance Command, Vietnam (MACV) Complex, VIP and General's quarters, Bachelor Officers’ Quarters (BOQ's), Bachelor Enlisted Quarters (BEQ's) and critical US facilities and installations throughout the city. This security mission was primarily aimed at deterring terrorist acts. The law enforcement mission involved normal military police functions in a metropolitan area, to include criminal investigations. The battalion supported the requirements of the provost marshal, US Army Headquarters Area Command (USAHAC), for military police/security guards within the resources available.

During the Tet Offensive of January–February 1968 the unit played a major role in the defense of Saigon against Vietcong (VC) attacks, in particular the attack on the US Embassy, battle of Cholon and Phu Tho Racetrack and the attack on the Joint General Staff Compound. At the start of the Tet Offensive the battalion was configured to perform traditional military policing roles, however it soon found itself engaged in urban combat for which it was ill-equipped. The battalion was to provide support for USAHAC in the conduct of disaster recovery operations by providing security, damage control and prevention of pilferage. The concept of operations envisioned a disaster or VC destruction such as the blowing up of a US billet (similar to the Victoria BOQ bombing in April 1966) by VC personnel. After confirmation of a disaster by the provost marshal, the battalion was to dispatch a 25-man alert force to the affected area. The team was organised into a control and cordon team which would seal off and clear the damaged area of all unauthorized personnel; a rescue team which would evacuate casualties from the building and a search team to assists explosive ordnance personnel in locating other bombs or explosives. There was no provision in the plan for use of battalion military police as fighting units. This concept was applied in response to the initial attack on the Joint General Staff Compound which was believed to be an attack on BOQ-3 and the alert force was ambushed by VC resulting in 17 MPs killed.

Companies A and B were based at the Capitol BEQ 107 Dong Khanh St (now Hem 107 Tran Hung Dao) (10.7524°N 106.6673°E), Cholon while Company C was based at MACV headquarters annex.

Companies A, B and C were inactivated on 29 March 1973 in South Vietnam.

=== Post-Cold War ===
The unit served in the Gulf War (1990–91), Iraq War (2003–4 and 2007–8) and the War in Afghanistan (2001–2021), West Africa Ebola Response (2014–2015)

=== Battalion Crest and Coat of Arms ===
Shield: The baton, or truncheon, was borne of high officers in monarchial establishments of the Middle Ages as a badge of authority and who were originally charged with military duties. Thus, this is symbolic of the functions of the organization in the just administration of the essential principles of justice.

Crest: The stylized scale signifies the mission of the unit to administer authority and justice. The scale consisting of bamboo and traditional carrying pole with two baskets denote the unit's area of service, Vietnam. The bamboo, consisting of seven segments, also symbolizes the decorations awarded to the unit for service in Southeast Asia. The sixteen spears symbolize military preparedness and readiness and their sixteen campaign credits.

Motto: "Lex Et Ordo" translates to "Law and Order". Background: The coat of arms was originally approved on 27 Aug 1942. It was amended to add a blazon on 1 Oct 1942. On 17 January 1975, the coat of arms was rescinded. The coat of arms was reinstated for the 716th Military Police Battalion on 4 June 1992. The coat of arms was amended to add a crest on 20 May 2020.

== Honors ==
=== Unit decorations ===
Ribbon	Award	Year	Notes
	Presidential Unit Citation (Army)	1968	Saigon Tet Offensive
	Presidential Unit Citation (Navy)	2003	Iraq
	Meritorious Unit Commendation (Army)		American Theater
	Meritorious Unit Commendation (Army)	1966	for service in Vietnam
	Meritorious Unit Commendation (Army)	1968	for service in Vietnam
	Meritorious Unit Commendation (Army)	1968–1969	for service in Vietnam
	Meritorious Unit Commendation (Army)	1990–1991	for service in Southwest Asia
	Meritorious Unit Commendation (Army)	2003–2004	for service in Iraq
	Meritorious Unit Commendation (Army)	2004–2005	for service in Afghanistan
	Meritorious Unit Commendation (Army)	2007-2008	for service in Iraq
	Meritorious Unit Commendation (Army)	2012	for service in Afghanistan
	Navy Unit Commendation		
	Republic of Vietnam Cross of Gallantry with Palm	1965–1968	for service in Vietnam
	Republic of Vietnam Cross of Gallantry with Palm	1968–1973	for service in Vietnam

=== Campaign streamers ===
Conflict	Streamer	Year(s)
Vietnam War	Vietnam Defense	
Vietnam War	Counteroffensive	
Vietnam War	Counteroffensive, Phase II	1966–1967
Vietnam War	Counteroffensive, Phase III	1967–1968
Vietnam War	Tet Counteroffensive	1968
Vietnam War	Counteroffensive, Phase IV	1968
Vietnam War	Counteroffensive, Phase V	1968
Vietnam War	Counteroffensive, Phase VI	1968–1969
Vietnam War	Tet 69/Counteroffensive	1969
Vietnam War	Summer–Fall 1969	1969
Vietnam War	Winter–Spring 1970	1970
Vietnam War	Sanctuary Counteroffensive	1970
Vietnam War	Counteroffensive, Phase VII	1970–1971
Vietnam War	Consolidation I	1970
Vietnam War	Consolidation II	1971
Gulf War	Defense of Saudi Arabia	1990
Gulf War	Liberation and Defense of Kuwait	1990
Gulf War	Cease-Fire	1991
Operation Iraqi Freedom	Liberation of Iraq	2004–2005
Operation Iraqi Freedom	Transition of Iraq	2006–2008
Operation Iraqi Freedom	Iraqi Surge	
Operation Iraqi Freedom	Iraqi Sovereignty	
