= United Kingdom and the Vietnam War =

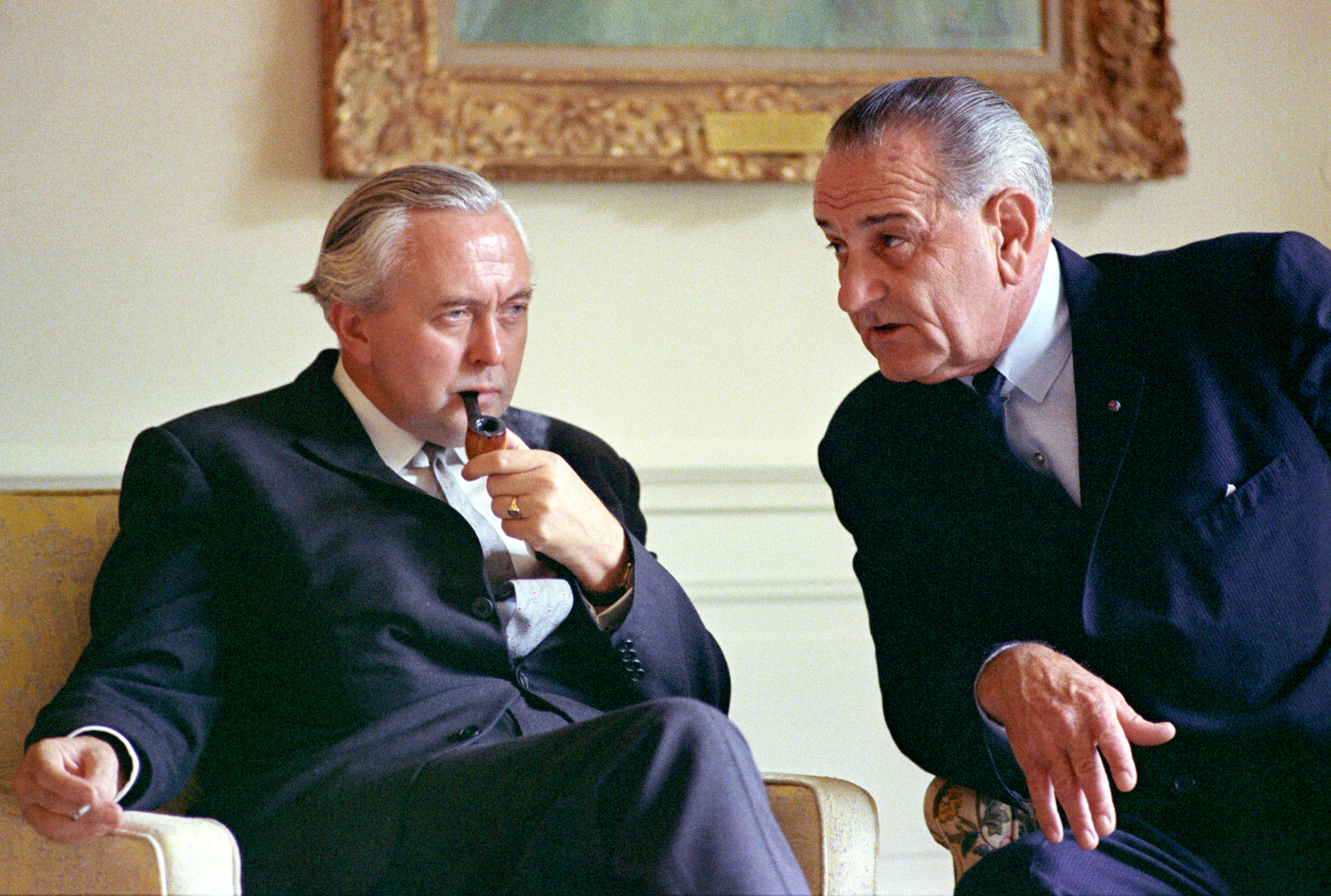
Wilson (L) and Johnson (R) in 1966

Although the United Kingdom did not officially participate in the Vietnam War, it provided de facto diplomatic support for the United States' war aims and it participated in international talks concerning the ongoing conflict. The UK co-chaired the 1954 Geneva Conference with the Soviet Union, overseeing the creation of the sovereign states of North Vietnam and South Vietnam in the final stages of the First Indochina War. Prior to the 1964 Gulf of Tonkin Resolution, the United Kingdom began providing support to the South Vietnamese government in the form of advice on the use of police and paramilitary forces to combat a communist insurgency.

After the 1964 escalation of American military involvement in Vietnam, the governments of prime ministers Harold Wilson and Edward Heath provided differing degrees of rhetorical support for the USA's war effort, but both refused to commit British troops to the conflict in spite of American pressure. The prospect of British military intervention in Vietnam was deeply unpopular among the general public, with a strong anti-war protest movement flourishing throughout the 1960s. Despite Britain's refusal to commit troops to conflict, it continued to receive substantial American financial support.

== Early British Involvement (pre-1964) ==
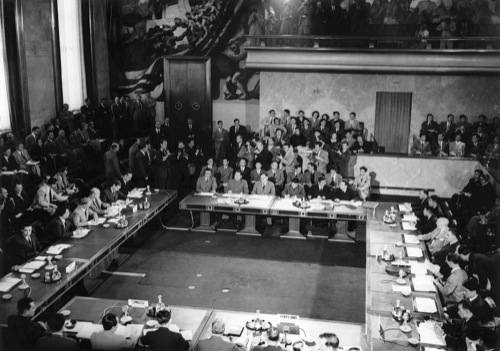
Geneva Conference, 1954

In 1945, immediately after the end of the Pacific War, British troops helped the French reestablish control in Southern Vietnam as part of Operation Masterdom. All British troops were withdrawn from Vietnam by mid-1946.

Throughout the course of the French Colonial War in Vietnam, the United Kingdom chose to avoid direct military commitments to anti-communist forces. During the Battle of Dien Bien Phu in the early months of 1954, The USA supported the French forces, with CIA-contracted pilots conducting 682 airdrops of supplies. Conservative Prime Minister Winston Churchill refused American president Dwight Eisenhower's request to provide British military support for the French colonial forces engaged in the battle. The UK then co-chaired the subsequent 1954 Geneva Conference, which negotiated an end to French colonial rule in Indochina and established North Vietnam and South Vietnam as two distinct zones separated at the 17th parallel.

After the establishment of the two separate Vietnamese states, Conservative prime minister Harold Macmillan sent a British Advisory Mission (BRIAM) to Saigon in 1961 to advise the South Vietnamese government on the use of police and paramilitary forces against communist guerrillas. This advice was based on Britain's own counterinsurgency against communist forces in Malaya. In his role as the head of BRIAM, counter-insurgency expert Robert Thompson provided advice to South Vietnamese president Ngo Dinh Diem and top-ranking American officials such as Lyman Lemnitzer, Robert McNamara and John Kennedy. Furthermore, it has been alleged that the RAF flew covert missions over Laos in 1962 as part of the effort to shut down the Ho Chi Minh Trail.

== The Wilson Government (1964–70) ==
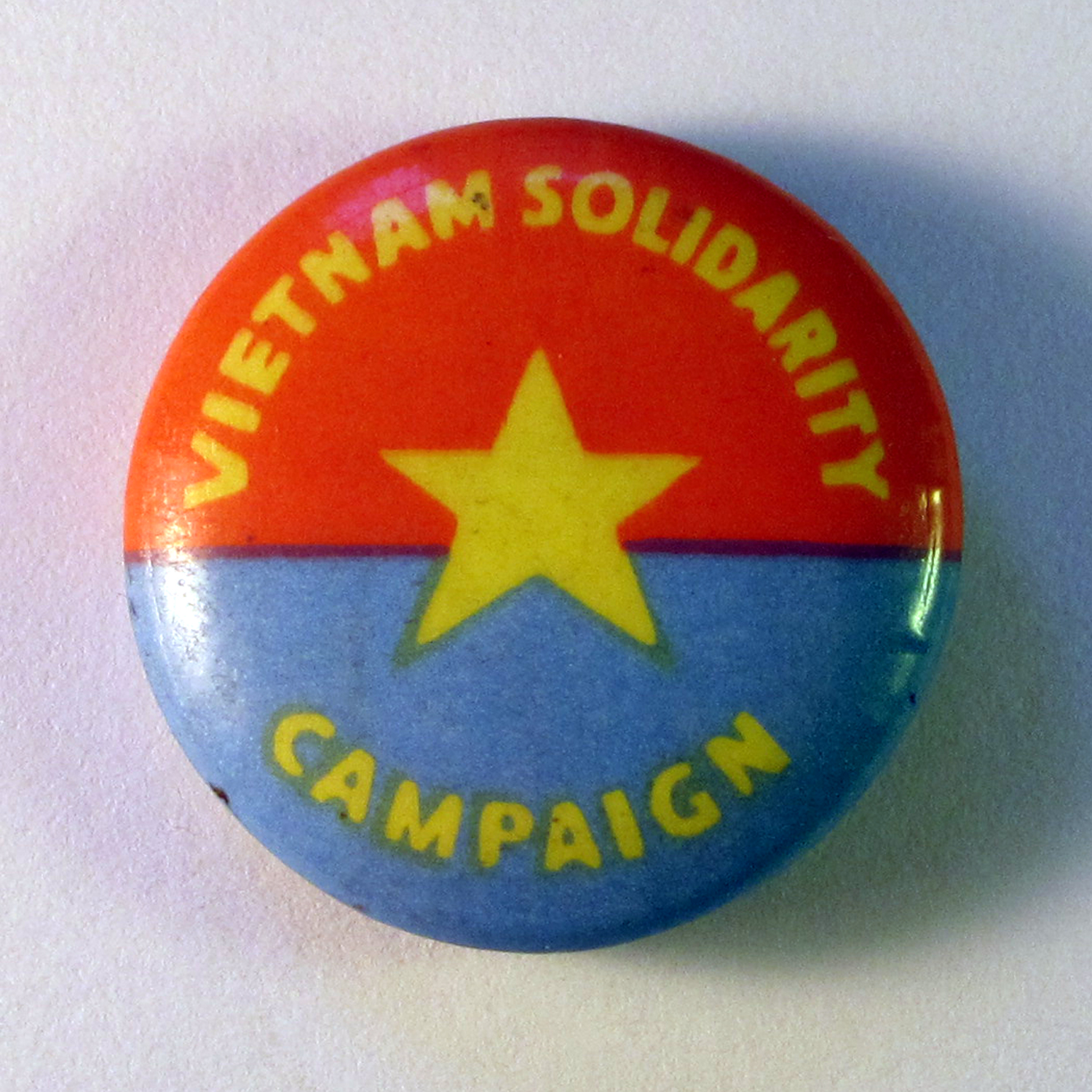
Vietnam Solidarity Campaign badge, c.1968

Labour Party leader Harold Wilson was elected to the office of Prime Minister in October 1964, only two months after the United States Congress had authorised President Lyndon Johnson to undertake military action against North Vietnam, resulting in a major escalation of the Vietnam War. Wilson continued the previous Conservative government's policy of support for US military intervention in Vietnam, though he was outspoken in his criticism of some aspects of the American war strategy, particularly the 1966 bombings of Haiphong and Hanoi. The Wilson government refused to deploy British troops to Vietnam despite great external pressure from the American government and internal pressure from the British Treasury and Foreign Office. In 1967, President Johnson offered to resolve Britain's economic troubles in return for Wilson's deployment of two British Brigades to Vietnam. Wilson refused.

Polls of British public opinion consistently revealed popular opposition to proposed British involvement in the conflict. A 1966 poll found that 81% of the British public disapproved of any potential British military intervention in Vietnam. The war was unpopular within the broader Labour Party, evidenced by the fact that its members voted to reject the government's Vietnam policy at the 1966 and 1967 Party conferences. Groups such as the Vietnam Solidarity Campaign organised mass demonstrations against the Vietnam War and British support for American military action. Demonstrations were held outside the American Embassy in Grosvenor Square on March 17 and October 27, 1968, drawing thousands of protestors and culminating in violent clashes with the police.

The British government covertly provided material support for the USA and South Vietnam throughout the 1960s. This included shipments of arms from British Hong Kong, including napalm and bombs. Macmillan's counter-insurgency training program was continued throughout the Wilson years and $2.4 million worth of economic aid was provided to South Vietnam. Furthermore, British intelligence services based in Hong Kong (at RAF Little Sai Wan) and inside the British consulate in Saigon provided the USA with reports on North Vietnamese activities throughout Wilson's time as prime minister. The British Consul-General in North Vietnam between 1967 and 1969 was Brian Stewart, a senior member of MI6.

The Wilson government made efforts to mediate a peace between the US and North Vietnam in 1967. During the four-day Tet truce in February 1967, Soviet Premier Alexei Kosygin visited the UK. Wilson met with Kosygin and made efforts to extend the Tet truce, beginning with a cessations of American bombing. The peace talks failed when Johnson refused to stop bombing North Vietnam until the North's communist infiltration of South Vietnam ceased. Wilson's diplomatic support of the American war effort was motivated in part by his reliance on the financial support that the USA provided to the British economy. During the 1960s, American financial support was crucial in maintaining the British welfare state, arts and science policies, housing policies and student grants. When Wilson was asked by a Labour party colleague why he did not condemn the Vietnam War, he responded: “we can’t kick our creditors in the balls”.

== The Heath Government (1970-74) ==
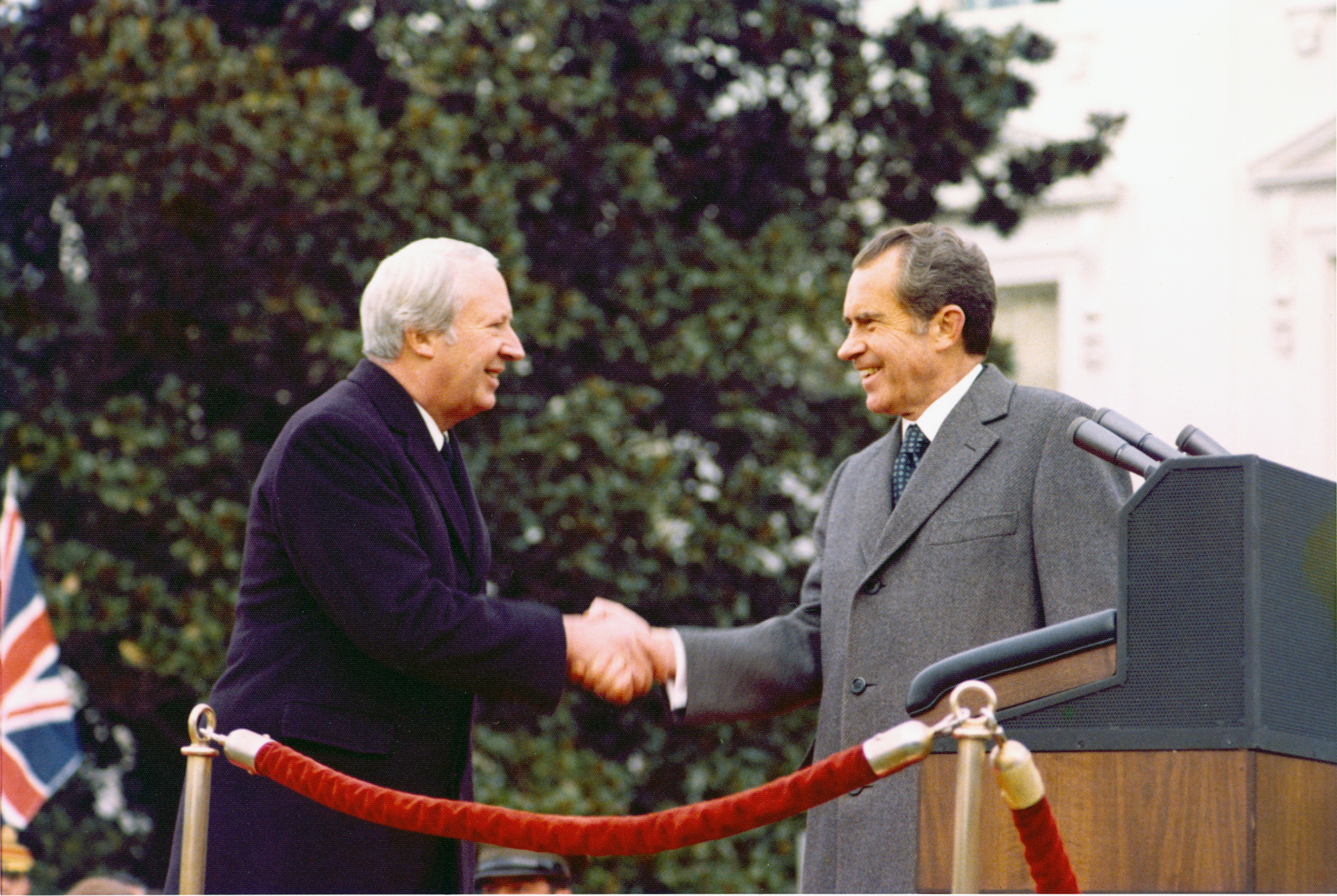
Heath (L) and Nixon (R) in 1973

Compared to Wilson, Conservative prime minister Edward Heath expressed greater rhetorical support of the American war effort in Vietnam. By the time that Heath became prime minister in 1970, Richard Nixon was the President of the United States. Heath had been a vocal supporter of the US war policy while he was Leader of the Opposition, and he went on to support the American Christmas bombing campaign (Operation Linebacker II) in December 1972. The governments of Italy, Sweden, France, Belgium, The Netherlands, Denmark, Finland and Norway all condemned the high number of civilian deaths (over 2,000) caused by Operation Linebacker II, making Heath a rare source of international support for the bombings. Heath's consistent support of America's military action in Vietnam led Nixon to call Heath the only solid friend in Europe that the USA had.

Despite the intensification of the British government's rhetorical support of the American war effort in Vietnam, Heath refused to deploy British troops to Vietnam. While in opposition, Heath had opposed the dispatch of British troops to Vietnam and he carried this policy into government, telling the House of Commons in July 1970 that he had no intention of sending British troops to Vietnam or becoming directly involved in the war. Thus, Heath continued Wilson's policy of diplomatic support without military intervention.

"Will the Prime Minister give a short, simple and categorical assurance that no matter what invitations his Government receive, British troops will never at any time be involved in the Vietnam conflict?" — Jim Sillars

"It has always been our position that we did not believe that British troops should be sent to Vietnam." — Edward Heath

Exchange in the House of Commons, Thursday the 16th of July 1970
