= Non-belligerent =

Entity that does not fight in a given conflict

A non-belligerent is a person, a state, or other organization that does not fight in a given conflict. The term is often used to describe a country that does not take part militarily in a war.

A non-belligerent state differs from a neutral one in that it may support certain belligerents in a war but is not directly involved in military operations. The term may also be used to describe a person not involved in combat or aggression, especially if combat or aggression is likely. In a situation of civil unrest such as a riot, civilians may be divided into belligerents, those actually fighting or intending to fight, and non-belligerents who are merely bystanders.

== Examples ==
=== Spain ===
During World War II, Spain allowed and promoted the Spanish Blue Division of volunteers and conscripts to join the German forces on the condition that they would fight against the Soviet Union only and they would do it with German equipment and uniforms. At the same time, allied aircraft made emergency landings in Spanish territories (Melilla, Mallorca) and the Spanish government returned the crews home safely. The aircraft were either scrapped due to poor condition or repaired and allocated in the Spanish Air Force if not reclaimed, or after a negotiated purchase.

=== United States ===
A notable example of a non-belligerent in an environment of total war was the United States' military support of the Allies in World War II, prior to their entry into the war following the Japanese attack on Pearl Harbor. The military support given by the Americans was through the Destroyers-for-bases deal in which the United States provide the United Kingdom "all possible assistance short of war" in the words of Winston Churchill.

=== Italy ===
From September 1939 to June 1940, when it joined the war with Germany, Italy was a non-belligerent.

=== Ireland ===
Although officially Ireland declared itself neutral in World War II, it can be disputed whether it was a non-belligerent or not, as The Cranborne Report drew up by the Viscount Cranborne to the British War Cabinet noted regarding Irish-British collaboration. An example of such collaboration was the permission for Allied use of Irish airspace for military means.

=== Sweden ===
While Sweden did not officially fight in the Winter War, a new Flying regiment was formed out of volunteers to aid Finland and took charge of defending Finnish Lapland; the aircraft for the regiment came directly from Swedish Air Force inventory.

=== Japan ===
The Article 9 of the Constitution of Japan denies the right of belligerence of states, in order to accomplish "international peace based on justice and order".

=== United Kingdom ===
The United Kingdom's government showed support for the United States in the Vietnam War, but the country did not send troops to fight in the war.

=== NATO ===
During the ongoing Russian invasion of Ukraine, the NATO states provide military equipment and economic support to Ukraine.

=== Others ===
Along with the US, the political stance of the Netherlands during the 2003 invasion of Iraq was described by politicians as "political support, but no military support".

== See also ==
- Irish neutrality during World War II
- Neutral powers during World War II
- Neutrality
- Non-Aligned Movement
