= Battle of San Marino =

WWII battle

- Part of the Gothic Line Offensive during the Italian Campaign (World War II)
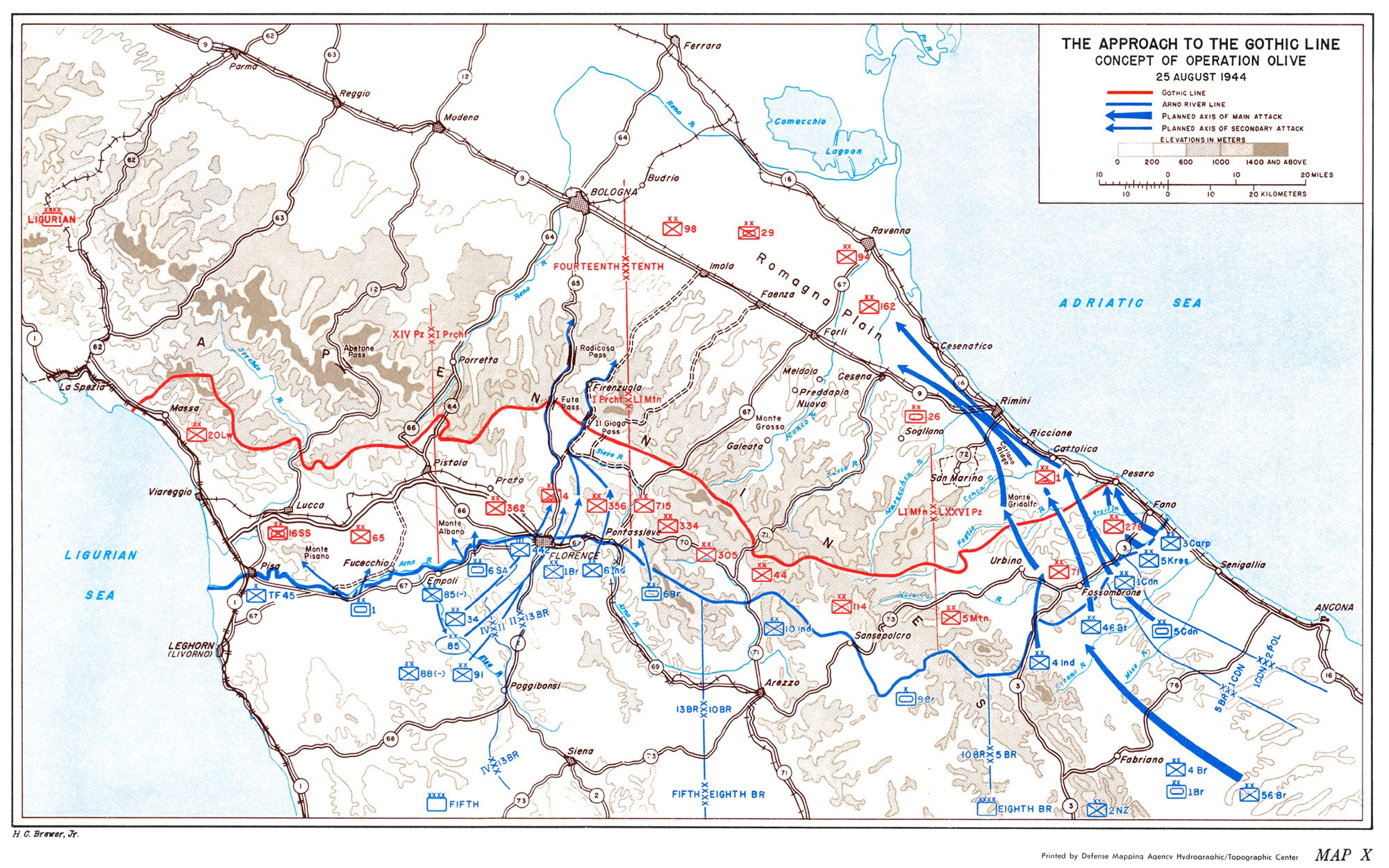
- The initial plan for Operation Olive, the attempt to break the Gothic Line (red); the planned offensive is shown in blue, along the eastern coast. The arrows converge north of San Marino.
Date	17–20 September 1944
Location	San Marino
Result	Allied victory

Belligerents
Germany	United Kingdom • British India

Commanders and leaders
(Nazi Germany) Harry Hoppe	(United Kingdom) Arthur Holworthy

Units involved
278. Infanterie-Division	4th Indian Infantry Division

Casualties and losses
274 killed 54 captured	323 killed

The Battle of San Marino was an engagement on 17–20 September 1944 during the Italian Campaign of the Second World War, in which German Army forces occupied the neutral Republic of San Marino microstate and were then attacked by Allied forces. It is also sometimes known as the Battle of Monte Pulito.

San Marino had declared its neutrality earlier in the war and had remained broadly unaffected by events in Europe until 1943, when Allied forces had advanced a sizable distance up the Italian Peninsula. A major German defensive position, the Gothic Line, ran across the peninsula a short distance south of the Sammarinese border, and in late June 1944, the country was bombed by the Royal Air Force, killing 63 people, in the belief that the German Army had taken up positions on its territory. In Operation Olive, launched in late August, a strong Allied force attacked at the very eastern end of the line, aiming to pass through Rimini—just east of San Marino—and break out onto the plains north of the city. Whilst San Marino was southwest of Rimini, the plan was for it to be bypassed entirely. In response to the Allied movements, the Germans sent a small force into San Marino to guard their lines of communication and act as artillery observers.

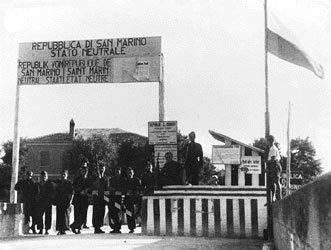
Neutrality placards at the borders of San Marino

After a few days, the main thrust of the offensive was halted south of Rimini by strong resistance and severe weather, and the British and Indian flanking forces began to push westwards, taking the frontline towards San Marino. On 17 September the 4th Indian Infantry Division attacked forces of the 278. Infanterie-Division holding two hills just across the Sammarinese border; after heavy fighting to gain control of the hills, the situation stabilised on the 19th, and Allied forces began to push into the City of San Marino itself. The city was captured by the afternoon of 20 September, and the 4th Indian Division left the country on the 21st, leaving it under the control of the local defence forces.

== Background ==
The microstate of San Marino, in the northern Italian Peninsula and fully surrounded by Italy, had played little role throughout the Second World War. It had a fascist government, closely aligned with Benito Mussolini's regime, but remained neutral. It was reported to have declared war against the United Kingdom in September 1940, though the Sammarinese government later transmitted a message to the British government stating that it had not. In early 1942, the Sammarinese government reiterated it was not at war with the United States, a position that was confirmed by the US State Department. The British Foreign Office noted more equivocally in 1944 that Britain had never declared war, but also had never formally recognised San Marino's neutrality, and that it felt that military action on Sammarinese territory would be justified if it were being used by Axis forces.

The country was bombed by the Allies on 27 June 1944, killing 63. The Sammarinese government declared the same day that no military installations or equipment were located on its territory, and that no belligerent forces had been allowed to enter. In early July, the Sammarinese government announced that prominent signs had been put up at the border crossings by the German command, to instruct German units not to enter the territory, and again reiterated its complete neutrality.

German troops were ordered in mid-August to respect the neutral status of San Marino, reserving the right for supply and medical services to transit the country, but in early September the German command acknowledged that it might deploy troops there during future operations, arguing "we cannot lose any battles for the sake of this little state". This left both Germany and the Allies acknowledging Sammarinese neutrality, but nonetheless prepared to move troops into the country if they felt it was required by operational needs.

== Prelude ==
=== Assault on the Gothic Line ===
By the late summer of 1944, German forces in Italy had withdrawn toward the Gothic Line, a chain of defended positions stretching across the Italian Peninsula. The Allies formulated a plan to break through the defences, pushing north toward Rimini and the plains of Northern Italy. This would involve a strong thrust up the eastern seaboard by the British Eighth Army, codenamed Operation Olive; 11 divisions would attack along a narrow front, converging on the "Rimini Gap", an 8 mi (13 km) stretch of plain along the coast around the city, and then moving northward. Once through the Gap, the force would deploy outward onto the Romagna Plain, and move westward toward Bologna. Meanwhile, the American Fifth Army would push north along the centre of the peninsula, hopefully converging on Bologna and trapping a large German force in a pincer movement.

The main Allied assault began on 25 August, reaching the Foglia valley—the Gothic Line proper—on 29 August. It was quickly breached, and the German command attempted to assemble a second defensive line on the Coriano ridge, a hilly spur to the north of the Conca river, and the last major geographic obstacle south of Rimini. The Allied offensive reached the river on 3 September, but ground to a halt due to mechanical difficulties with its tanks, strengthening German resistance, and heavy rain. The Allied forces halted, and brought up reinforcements whilst waiting for a chance to resume the offensive along the coast. On the left flank of the assault, the attack had been halted in the Battle of Gemmano, to the south of the Conca river.

At this point, the forces on the Allied left wing were strung out in a line running due south from the Coriano ridge, facing westward toward San Marino, a few miles distant. The 56th (London) Infantry Division was opposite Croce, with the 46th Infantry Division opposite the heavily defended position at Gemmano. The 4th Indian Infantry Division was to the south of the 46th, forming the very left wing of the offensive. When the assault on Coriano was resumed on the 12th, led by two armoured divisions with heavy artillery support, these forces pushed westwards; their goal was to pass through towards the town of Montescudo, about two miles from the Sammarinese border. The main assault successfully pushed onto the ridge, and the 56th Division advanced about 1 mi (1.6 km) past Croce, before digging in on the evening of the 13th; that night, the 4th Indian Division gained a foothold south of Gemmano. It was finally captured by the 46th and 4th Indian Divisions on the morning of the 15th, and the British forces prepared to move toward Montescudo and exploit the German confusion.

== Battle ==
=== Entry into San Marino ===
On 13 September, the German Army sent a strong force into San Marino to defend it against the Allies; this would also give them control of one of the major roads in the area, and allow artillery observers to occupy the mountain peaks. The defending force was drawn from the 278. Infanterie-Division, whilst the 4th Indian Division was assigned to attack it on the 17th.

The 46th Division took Montescudo on the 15th, and on the next day the 56th Division entered the town of Mulazzano, directly north of Montescudo and equally close to the border. The fighting pressed westward from here, with the 56th Division on the northern flank and the 46th on the south; both were held back by strong German resistance.

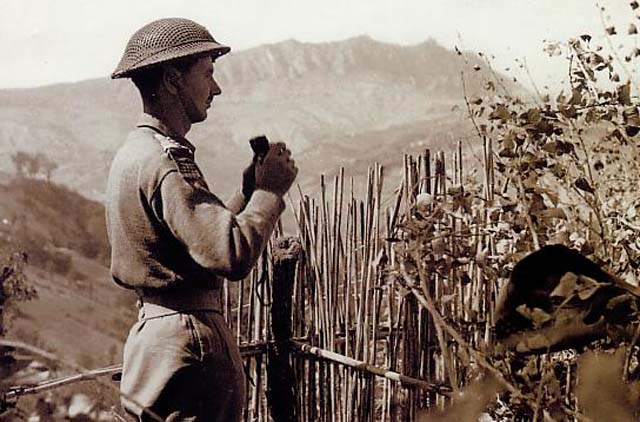
British soldier observing German positions near San Marino

The leading elements of the 4th Indian Division—the 3rd/10th Baluch Regiment—crossed the Marano River on the eastern border on the night of the 17th to enter San Marino, with the 1st/9th Gurkha Rifles moving through them to attack Points 343 and 366 near Faetano. These small hills—just behind the river—were held by two battalions of the 993rd Grenadier Regiment. The first—Point 343—was taken at 05:00, but the force occupying Point 366 had to fall back after running low on ammunition. Rifleman Sher Bahadur Thapa was posthumously awarded the Victoria Cross for holding the crest of the hill single-handed for two hours, allowing two companies to withdraw in safety, before being killed whilst trying to rescue another wounded Gurkha.

Point 343 was held through the 18th, however, though with the loss of 63 men; by the evening, a force of tanks had managed to come up and stabilise the position with the aid of artillery support. The 4th/11th Sikh Regiment moved around the Gurkhas to the north, covering the northern flank of the San Marino heights, and the division's 11th Brigade passed through them to help encircle the city. On the evening of the 19th, the 2nd Battalion, Queen's Own Cameron Highlanders of 11th Indian Infantry Brigade began to push into the outskirts of the city from the north, but early on the morning of the 20th were held back by defensive positions in the north-west of the city, where the road to the upper part of the city, situated higher on the mountain, began. Tanks moved into the suburbs, whilst a company of the Camerons moved uphill toward the summit in heavy rain. The city was secured by the early afternoon. The attackers took around 30 casualties, with 20 defenders killed and 54 prisoners taken.

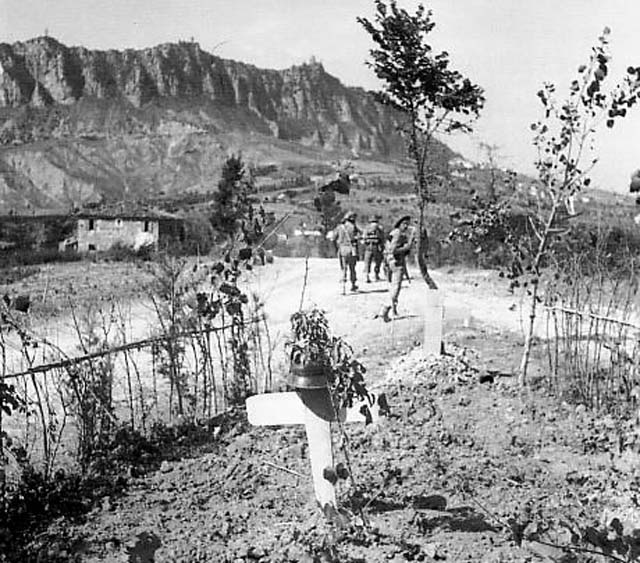
Allied troops passing through San Marino, September 1944

On the 21st, the local defence forces were enlisted to help mop up straggling German troops, and the 4th Indian Division pressed onward through a heavy gale and passed out of the country.

== Aftermath ==
Allied forces remained in occupation of San Marino for a short period after the German surrender. The legal status of this was nuanced; a liaison officer from the Allied military government in Italy was sent there, but a military government was not set up due to Sammarinese neutrality, and it was announced that occupying troops would be withdrawn as soon as possible. The Sammarinese government was asked to impose a curfew for security reasons, but declined, and the British did not force the matter. The country was visited by a number of Allied dignitaries following the occupation, including Harold Macmillan, the British Resident Minister for the Mediterranean, as well as Harold Alexander, commander in chief in Italy, and Oliver Leese, commander of Eighth Army.

The occupying forces provided help to reestablish water and electrical supplies, which had been destroyed by the Germans, who had also removed all but one truck from the country. Food supplies were also sent to help support the large number of refugees who had fled to San Marino, including a substantial amount of the population of Rimini. Italian carabineri were deployed to secure the border of San Marino and remained in place until fighting had moved further up the peninsula. A typhoid epidemic broke out in San Marino in October, with over 800 cases recorded, and another 340 among refugees who had returned to Rimini; 93 died in total.

In October 1945, after the end of the war, the Sammarinese government submitted a claim for 732 million lira to the British government for wartime compensation, of which 500 million lira were given as the related costs of the fighting in September and 20 million lira as the costs of the occupation. The British government rejected this claim, arguing that as Germany had breached the Sammarinese neutrality before Allied troops had entered the country, it was not liable; it did, however, offer an ex gratia payment of £26,000 in regard to the June bombing, later increased to £80,000 (equivalent of 32 million lira).

The battle honour "San Marino" was awarded to three British Army units — the Royal Lincolnshire Regiment, the York and Lancaster Regiment, and the Queen's Own Cameron Highlanders — and two Indian Army units, the 1st/9th Gurkha Rifles and the 4th/11th Sikh Regiment. The latter three of these had fought as part of 4th Indian Division in the main attack, whilst the first two had had battalions in the 138th Infantry Brigade of 46th Division.
