= Tet Offensive battle of Cholon and Phu Tho Racetrack =

Part of the Vietnam War (1968)

- Part of The Tet Offensive of the Vietnam War
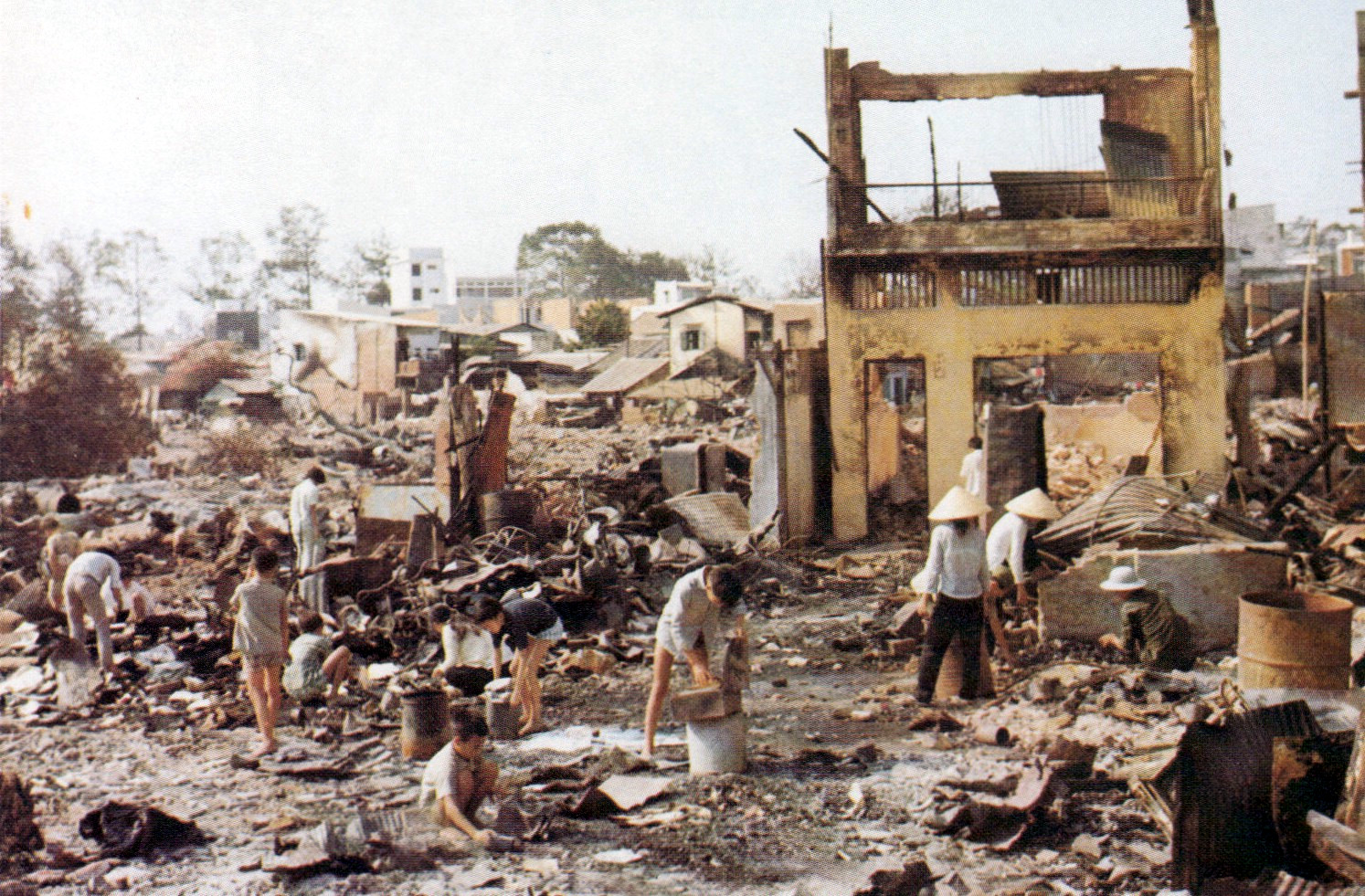
- Destroyed houses in Cholon
Date	31 January – 11 February 1968
Location	Cholon, South Vietnam 10.762°N 106.657°E
Result	US/South Vietnamese victory

Belligerents
United States; South Vietnam	Viet Cong

Commanders and leaders
(United States) Lt Col. Gordon D. Rowe; Lt Col. John K. Gibler; MG Keith L. Ware (South Vietnam) General Cao Văn Viên	General Trần Độ

Units involved
(United States) 716th Military Police Battalion; 3rd Battalion, 7th Infantry Regiment; Troop D, 17th Cavalry Regiment (South Vietnam) 30th Ranger Battalion; 33rd Ranger Battalion; 38th Ranger Battalion	6th Binh Tan Battalion

Casualties and losses
(United States) 12 killed (South Vietnam) Unknown	US body count 170 killed or captured

The battle of Cholon and Phú Thọ Racetrack began during the early hours of 31 January 1968 and continued until 11 February 1968. The attacks by Vietcong (VC) forces were one of several major attacks around Saigon in the first days of the Tet Offensive. The attacks were repulsed with the VC suffering heavy losses and substantial damage to the densely populated area of Cholon.

== Background ==
The 6th Binh Tan Battalion was tasked with attacking the Chí Hòa Prison in western Saigon. The battalion was to infiltrate the city from the west and establish a base of operations at Phú Thọ Racetrack and then launch their attack on the prison 1.5 km to the northeast.

Security within Saigon was the responsibility of the South Vietnamese with the only US ground unit in the city being the 716th Military Police Battalion which was responsible for law enforcement duties in respect of US personnel.

The Tết ceasefire began on 29 January, but was cancelled on 30 January after the VC/People's Army of Vietnam prematurely launched attacks in II Corps and II Field Force, Vietnam commander, Lieutenant general Frederick C. Weyand deployed his forces to defend Saigon.

At 03:00 on 30 January, the 200-man 6th Binh Tan Battalion and 100 conscripted civilian porters, infiltrated the city from the west and were met by local VC guides who led them to the Phú Thọ Racetrack. A second set of guides who were supposed to lead the Battalion to the Chí Hòa Prison didn't turn up and eventually the Battalion commander sent two companies into the city to try to find the Prison while keeping his remaining two companies at the Racetrack.

== Battle ==
At 04:45 a 716th MP Battalion two-man gun-jeep patrol drove through the intersection at the southern end of the Racetrack (10.762°N 106.657°E). The VC fired on the jeep killing one MP immediately while the other MP radioed a distress call before he was also killed. The radio message was not understood at the 716th MP Battalion headquarters who were dealing with multiple other attacks around the city with the result that over the following hour, two more jeep patrols drove through the intersection and were engaged by the VC with two more MPs killed and two wounded.

At approximately 06:00 716th MP Battalion commander Lieutenant colonel Gordon Rowe sent a truck carrying 13 MPs to investigate the missing patrols. The MPs arrived at the intersection, rescued the two wounded MPs and then withdrew to a fighting position in a building on the southeast of the intersection. Rowe sent further reinforcements to engage the VC but they were unable to make any progress against the VC.

Weyand ordered Lieutenant colonel John K. Gibler's 3rd Battalion, 7th Infantry Regiment stationed approximately 10 km southwest to move into the city to assist the MPs. Gibler ordered his Company A to the south of Cholon where they met up with Troop D, 17th Cavalry Regiment with its eight M113 armored personnel carriers and this combined unit was designated Task Force Gibler. Meanwhile, Army of the Republic of Vietnam (ARVN) Joint General Staff commander General Cao Văn Viên ordered two companies of the 33rd Ranger Battalion to join Task Force Gibler and ordered the 38th Ranger Battalion operating west of Saigon to advance on the Racetrack from the west.

Task Force Gibler and the 33rd Rangers moved north through Cholon and as they approached the Racetrack they began to take fire from VC in windows and on rooftops of the 2-3 storey row houses lining the road. The US/ARVN infantry fanned out into alleys and side-streets to engage the VC, while the M113s continued down the road firing on the VC with their machine guns, with the command vehicle being knocked out by a Rocket-propelled grenade (RPG).

At 11:00 Task Force Gibler and the ARVN 38th Rangers converged on the southern intersection, joining up with the 716th MP Battalion platoon. At this time control of the battle passed to Major general Keith L. Ware and his Hurricane Forward tactical headquarters at Camp Lê Văn Duyệt which assumed tactical control of all U.S. units within the Saigon Capital Military District.

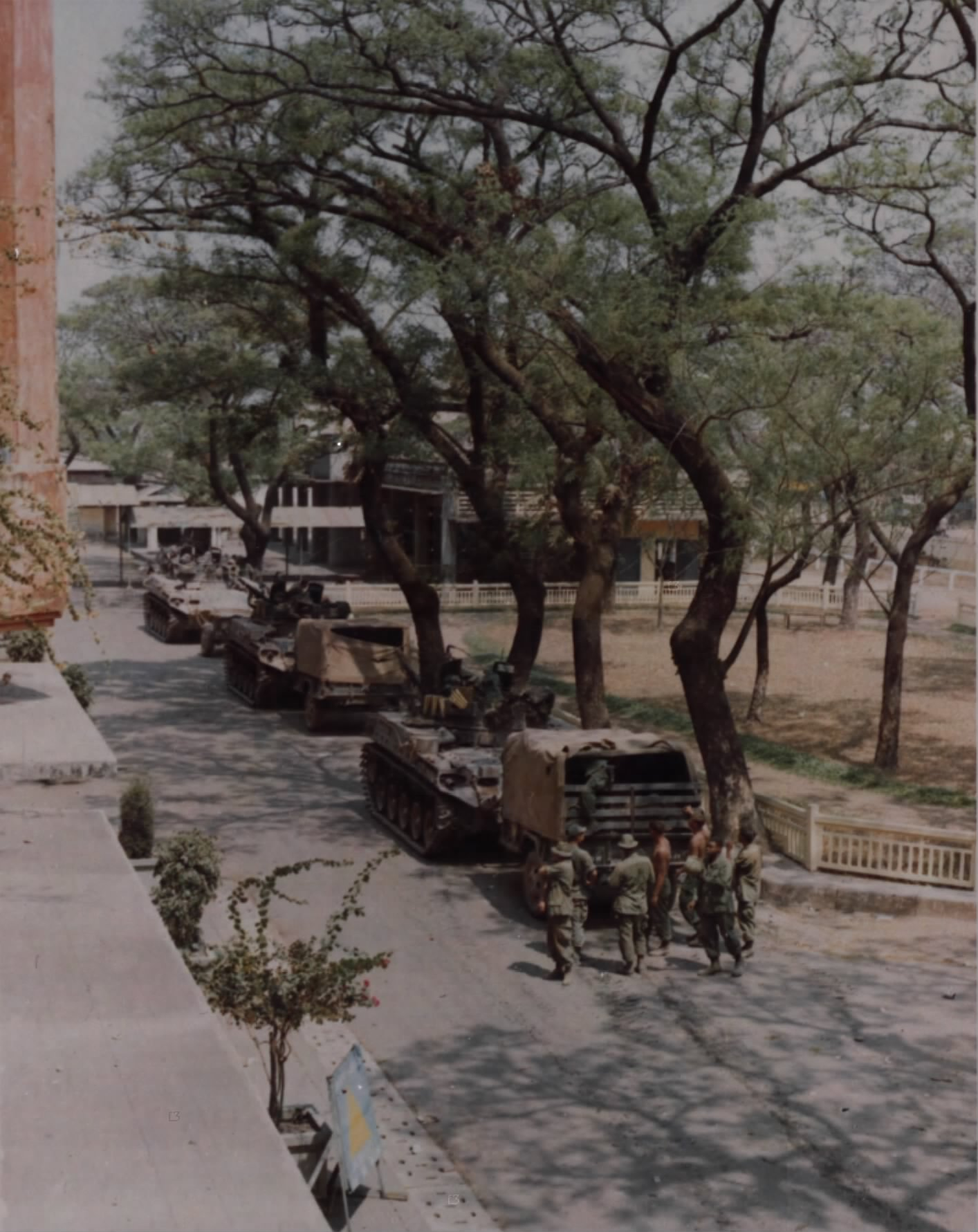
US armored vehicles at Phu Tho Racetrack, 9 February 1968

The US/ARVN forces now supported by helicopter gunships began blasting the VC in the Racetrack's concrete stadium building with 106-mm recoilless rifle fire while also engaging them with machine gun and rifle fire. By late afternoon the VC abandoned the Racetrack, exfiltrating in three-man groups into the residential neighbourhood to the west, pursued by the Rangers and Republic of Vietnam National Police.

Having secured the Racetrack, the U.S. forces used it as a base of operations with helicopters landing the rest of the 3/7th Infantry and an artillery battery there that evening.

On the morning of 1 February, Ware reinforced Task Force Gibler with Companies A and B, 5th Battalion, 60th Infantry Regiment a mechanised infantry unit equipped with M113s. Task Force Gibler spent the day clearing the neighborhood around the Racetrack, engaging small VC units with two M113s damaged by RPG fire and by nightfall the neighborhood was declared secure.

On 4 February the residents of Cholon were ordered to evacuate the area and it was declared a Free-fire zone allowing the full weight of U.S./South Vietnamese air and artillery support to be directed against the VC still holding out there.

On 11 February Task Force Gibler launched an attack on the Phu Lam Pagoda (10.747°N 106.624°E) which ARVN intelligence believed to be the VC headquarters for all operations in Saigon. The VC were entrenched in the pagoda and in bunkers and tunnels in the adjacent cemetery. In a day of hard fighting Task Force Gibler supported by fire from M42 Dusters overran the position killing 49 VC and capturing four together with maps, radios and other equipment for the loss of six U.S. soldiers killed.

== Aftermath ==
Only 30 soldiers of the 6th Battalion returned to their base camp near the Vàm Cỏ Đông River following the battle.
