= Bombing of San Marino in World War II =

Military actions during WWII

Bombing of San Marino
- Part of strategic bombing during World War II
Date	26 June – 29 August 1944
Location	San Marino

Belligerents
United Kingdom	San Marino

Casualties and losses
None	Rail facilities destroyed, extensive damage in the City of San Marino, 63 deaths and unknown number of wounded

The bombing of San Marino was a series of British aerial bombing attacks on the microstate of San Marino during World War II. Eight air raids were carried out by the Royal Air Force (RAF) in 1944 as part of the Allied campaign of strategic bombing during World War II. While the aerial attacks managed to destroy the railway line that connected San Marino to nearby Rimini, the nation itself proclaimed to be neutral during WWII and the intelligence that the Germans were using the railway line to transport weapons turned out to be wrong later on. Because of this, the bombing is considered to be controversial to this day, especially in San Marino itself.

== Background ==
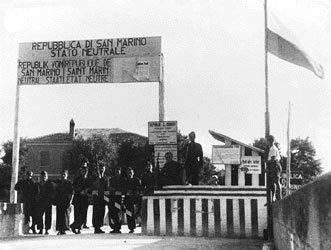
A neutral warning on the border of San Marino during WWII, written in Italian, German and French.

The small, landlocked nation of San Marino remained long sheltered from the effects of the war. Surrounded by Fascist Italy, it had declared itself as a neutral nation at the outbreak of the war, despite the Sammarinese Fascist Party ruling the country since the 1920s. Because of this, it continued to do business with Fascist Italy and its railway line with Rimini remained in operation. The population of San Marino was 14,500 in 1939, one year before the war started.

== Attacks ==
A total of eight documented aerial attacks were carried out on San Marino. The biggest and most known bombing raid was carried out on 26 June 1944 by multiple RAF aircraft, specifically the Desert Air Force. A total of 263 bombs were dropped on the City of San Marino in three waves between 11:03 to 12:38 by 41 Martin B-26 Marauder and Martin Baltimore attack bombers, causing extensive destruction and damage to both houses and public buildings in the city.

After the main attack, seven smaller raids were carried out all over San Marino, the last one only ending on 29 August 1944. In the last attack, the San Marino railway line was hit. The reason for the attack was the belief that the railway infrastructure was used by the Germans for the movement of war personnel, as well as weapons. It was also assumed that the Allies bombed San Marino because they wanted to kill Field Marshal Albert Kesselring, who they believed was visiting the micronation at the time.

== Aftermath ==
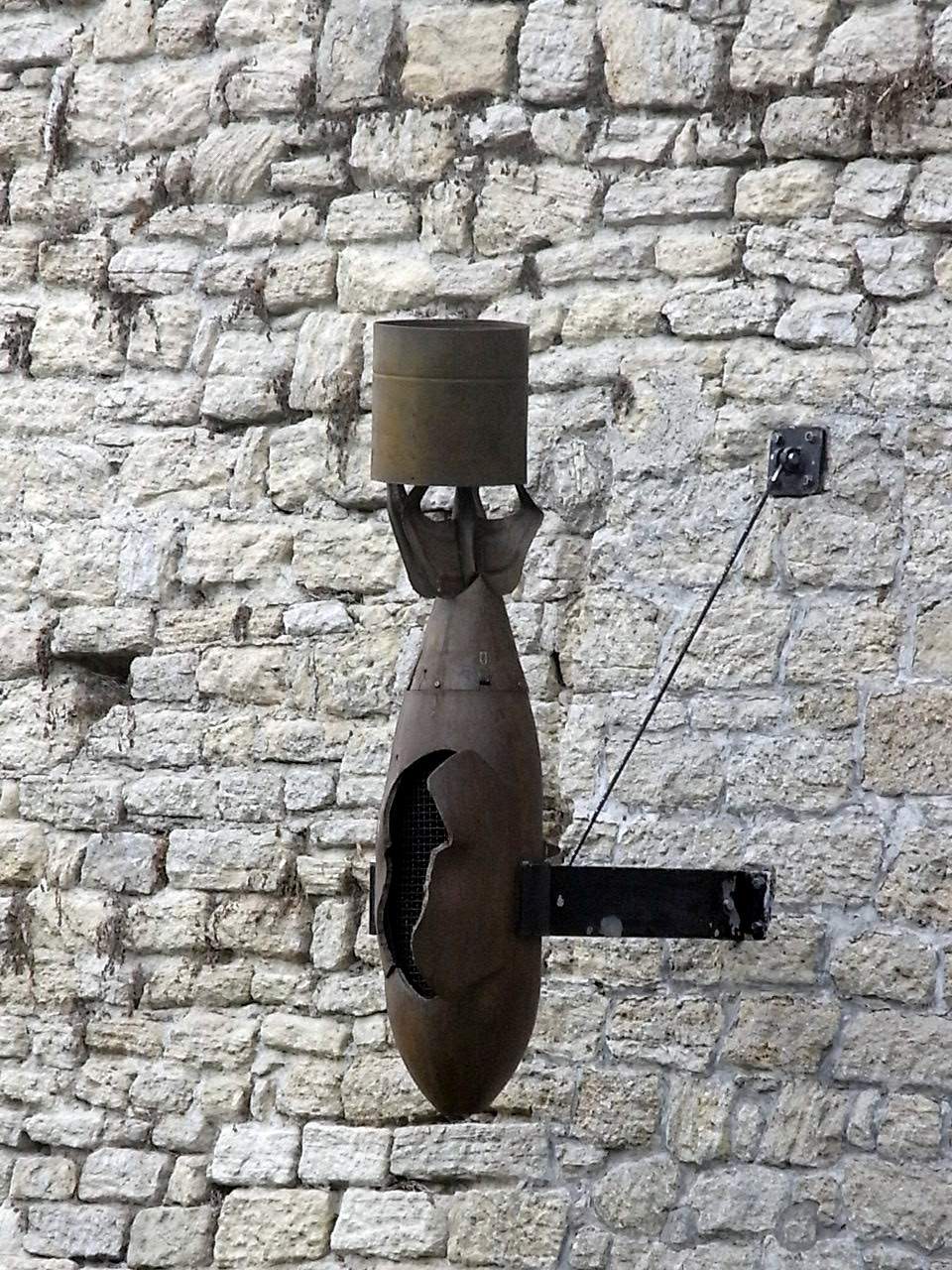
The monument remembering the bombing of San Marino on 26 June 1944 inside the old walls of the city.

After the bombing raid, the Allies carried out the plan to invade San Marino, despite the country declaring neutrality from the onset of the war. The Battle of San Marino took place between 17 and 20 September 1944 and led to an Allied victory, with the battle killing 274 German and 323 British soldiers. San Marino was invaded to pursue the Germans who were fleeing northwards.

Later on, it was discovered that the intelligence received which led to the bombing of San Marino was false, something that Winston Churchill later admitted. The British government however rejected some of the guilty responsibility, as the neutrality of San Marino, contrary to its claims, was previously broken by Germany. In October 1944, San Marino demanded material compensation of 732 million lire (then approxiately 421,000 British pounds sterling). The United Kingdom in turn proposed a voluntary payment of £26,000, which San Marino refused to accept. Ultimately, the Republic of San Marino was compensated with £80,000 on 7 July 1961. It was also acknowledged, with an explicit stance by the House of Commons, that San Marino had been rigorous in pursuing its customary neutrality during the war.

The bombing of San Marino ended up destroying the railway connection to Rimini, which was demolished in 1950. Despite the continuous requests to reopen the line by the San Marinese government, the line was considered to be of little importance by the Italian government and too costly to repair once the war ended. It also didn't help that the parties who were leading the government in San Marino at the time were the Sammarinese Communist Party and Sammarinese Socialist Party - two parties who were disliked and distrusted by the west at the height of the Cold War. Even if the line was partially reopened after the war to function as a heritage railway, the entire old line remains out of operation to this day. Besides the railway line, the city of San Marino itself was also hit, causing extensive damage to houses and public buildings. The historic Palazzo Valloni was hit, as was the Servants of Mary Church (Chiesa dei Servi di Maria).

On the occasion of the 50th anniversary of the bombing, a monument was inaugurated inside the walls of the historic center of the city of San Marino on 26 June 1994 with the following Italian text: "A 50 anni dal bombardamento non cada nell'obblio la memoria delle vittime innocenti in offesa alla neutralità dell'asilo a 100 mila profughi. I Sammarinesi rinnovano la domanda di pace e di solidarietà fra tutti i popoli." ("50 years after the bombing does not fall into oblivion the memory of the innocent victims of the attack on the neutrality of the asylum for 100,000 refugees. The San Marinese renew the demand for peace and solidarity among all peoples" in English). On 5 June 2024, a new monument was inaugurated outside of the city walls, with the goal of valuing the contribution that San Marino puts to memorize the victims of the bombing and the pursue of the defense of universal peace.

== See also ==
- Strategic bombing during World War II
- Bombing of Rimini in World War II
