= De contumace capiendo =

De contumace capiendo (literally, "Of (for) contempt seize him!") is a writ issued out of the Court of Chancery for the arrest of a defendant who is in contempt of an ecclesiastical court. It was created when Parliament intervened in 1813 to strip the Church of the power to excommunicate for contempt by writ de excommunicato capiendo.
