= Tet Offensive attack on Joint General Staff Compound =

Part of the Vietnam War (1968)

- Part of The Tet Offensive of the Vietnam War
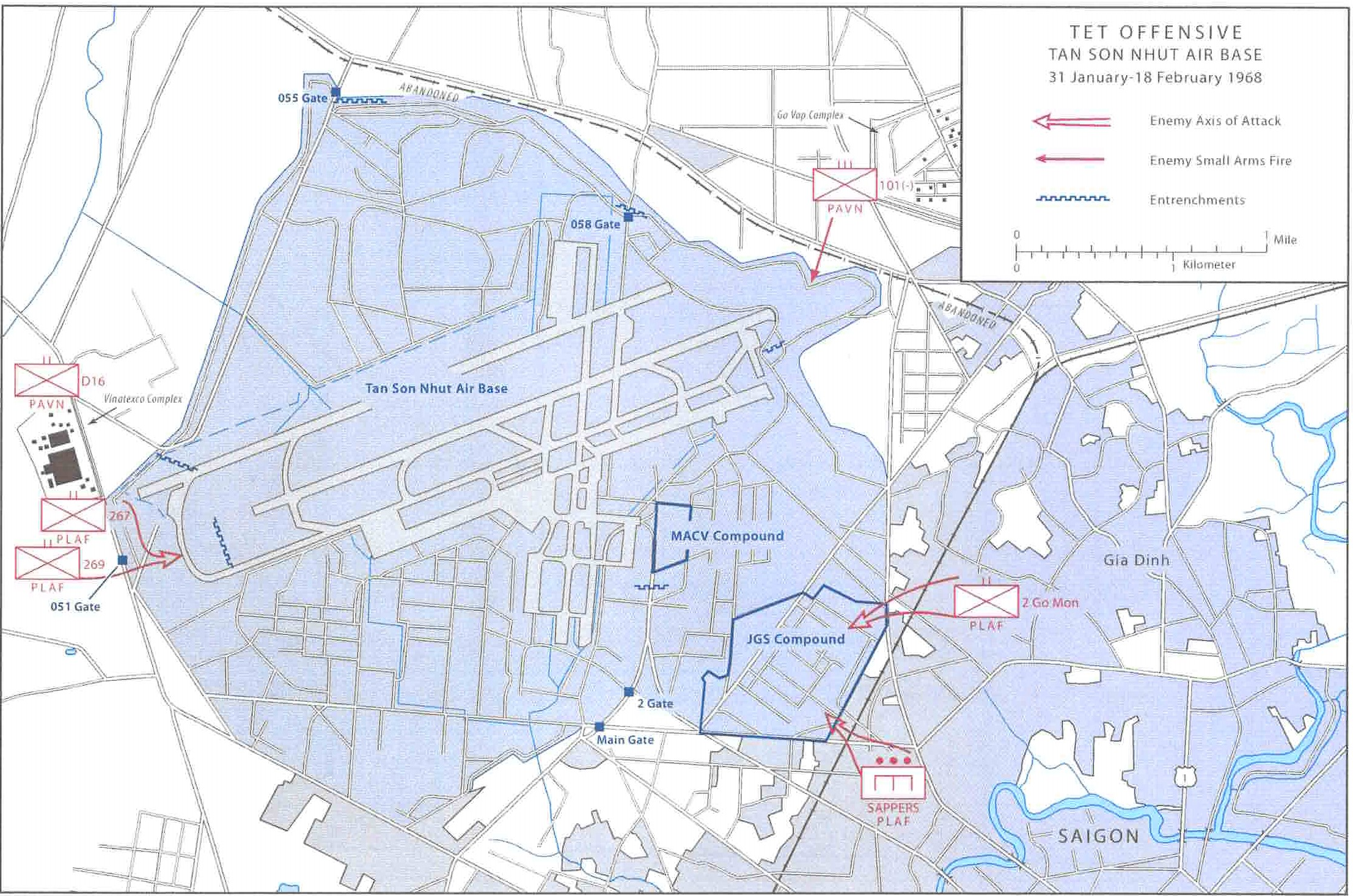
- Tet Offensive attack on Tan Son Nhut and JGS, 31 January 1968
Date	31 January – 1 February 1968
Location	Saigon, South Vietnam 10.8°N 106.671°E
Result	US/South Vietnamese victory

Belligerents
United States; South Vietnam	Viet Cong

Commanders and leaders
(United States) Lt Col. Gordon D. Rowe (South Vietnam) General Cao Văn Viên	

Units involved
(United States) 716th Military Police Battalion (South Vietnam) 8th Airborne Battalion; 6th Airborne Battalion; 2nd Marine Battalion	2nd Go Mon Battalion

Casualties and losses
(United States) 17 killed	US/ARVN Claim: 10 killed 10 captured

The attack on the Joint General Staff (JGS) Compound, the headquarters of the Republic of Vietnam Military Forces, occurred during the early hours of 31 January 1968. The JGS was located east of Tan Son Nhut Air Base. The attack by Vietcong (VC) forces was one of several major attacks on Saigon in the first days of the Tet Offensive. The attack was repulsed with the VC suffering heavy losses; no material damage was done to the compound.

== Background ==
Security within Saigon was the responsibility of the South Vietnamese with the only US ground unit in the city being the 716th Military Police Battalion which was responsible for law enforcement duties in respect of US personnel.

The Tết ceasefire began on 29 January, but was cancelled on 30 January after the VC/PAVN prematurely launched attacks in II Corps and II Field Force, Vietnam commander, LG Frederick C. Weyand deployed his forces to defend Saigon. General Cao Văn Viên, chief of the Joint General Staff, ordered the 8th Airborne Battalion, which was to deploy north to Quảng Trị Province, to remain at Tan Son Nhut Air Base and for four Marine battalions to be redeployed to Saigon.

== Battle ==
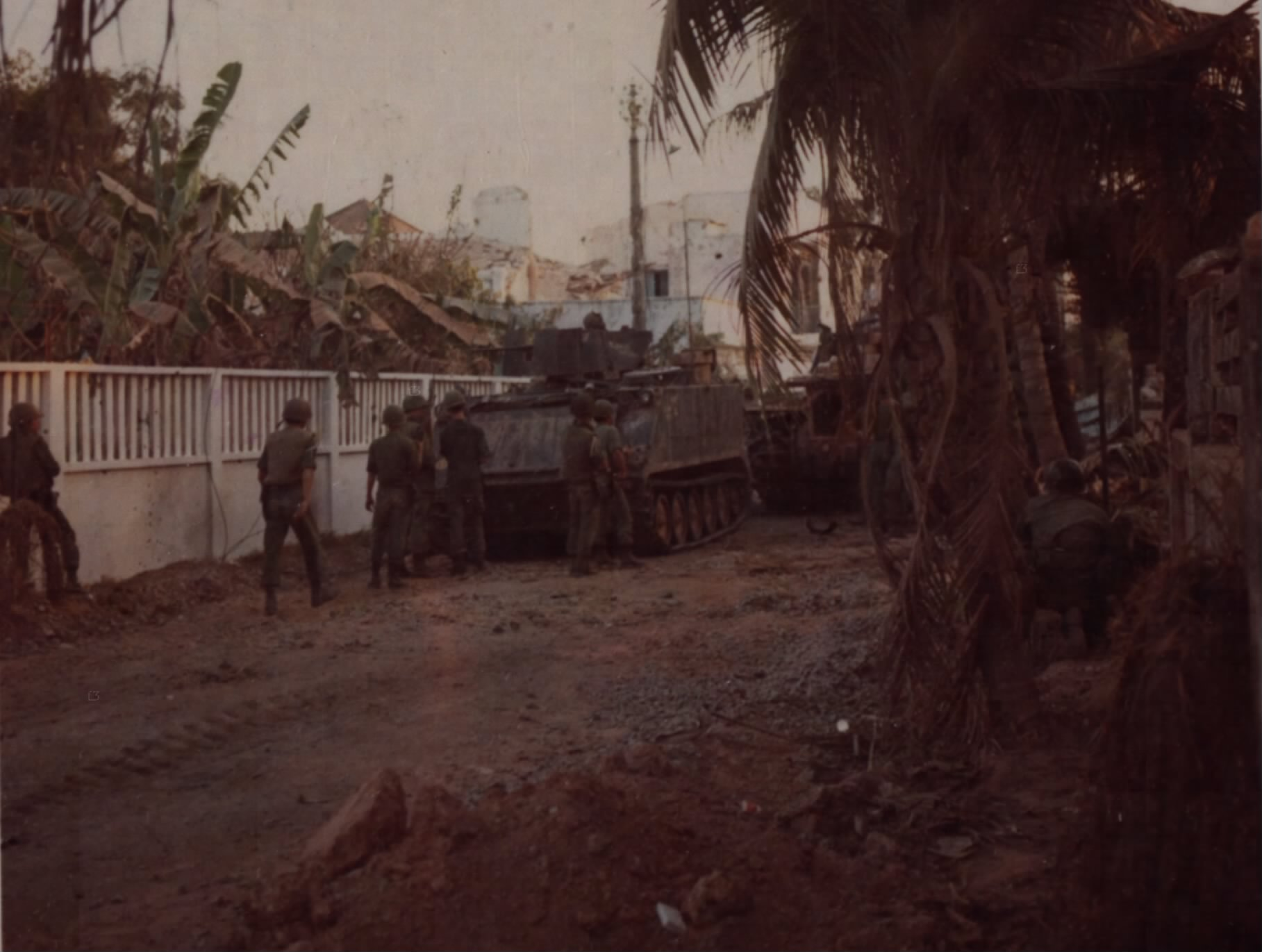
ARVN forces near BOQ 3, 31 January 1968

At 03:00 on 31 January, a South Vietnamese military car turned off of Vo Tanh Street (now Hoàng Văn Thụ street), a major road along the southern perimeter of the JGS and entered Gate 5 of the JGS (10.8°N 106.671°E). At that moment, 22 VC armed with AK-47s and three B40 grenade launchers appeared in the alleyway opposite Gate 5 on the other side of Vo Tanh Street and attempted to rush the gate. The South Vietnamese guards closed the gate and opened fire on the VC killing several and forcing them to take cover in residential buildings in the alleyway. Further down the alleyway was Bachelor Officers’ Quarters (BOQ) No. 3, a residence for U.S. officers and a guard from the 716th MP Battalion saw the firefight, locked its doors and radioed a warning to the 716th MP Battalion headquarters.

The commander of the 716th MP Battalion, Lieutenant colonel Gordon D. Rowe ordered two gun-jeep patrols to investigate the report and when they arrived they learnt that more than a dozen VC were located in buildings somewhere in the alleyway. The MPs called for reinforcements, instructing them to avoid the alleyway as they approached. A reaction force of 26 MPs from Company C was sent with three riding in a gun-jeep followed by 23 MPs in an M35 truck. The two vehicles turn up the alleyway and while the jeep was not fired on, the truck was hit and disabled by a B-40 rocket. As the MPs jumped off the truck they were hit by VC automatic weapons fire which killed 16 and wounded the other seven. Two of the wounded MPs were able to crawl to safety and a third was rescued, but the intense VC fire prevented any further rescue attempts. At 13:00 a V100 armored car from the 720th Military Police Battalion based at Long Binh Post arrived at BOQ3 and the MPs were then able to recover the remaining survivors and most of the dead. The VC remained in their positions until 1 February when South Vietnamese forces overran them killing 10 and capturing the rest.

At 07:00, approximately 200 VC from the 2nd Go Mon Battalion attacked Gate 2 of the JGS compound (10.8°N 106.6756°E) with B-40 rockets, killing the sentries and entering into the southeast corner of the JGS. The VC occupied several empty administrative buildings, instead of moving 500 meters northwest to attack the actual headquarters building. On learning of this latest attack, Viên ordered the 8th Airborne Battalion to send two companies to the JGS to expel the VC. At 09:00, U.S. helicopters dropped the Airborne companies at Viên’s headquarters and he deployed them to pin the VC in place until more reinforcements arrived. The 2nd Marine Battalion and the 6th Airborne Battalion were deployed several hours later and moved to engage the VC, forcing them to abandon their positions by nightfall and disperse into the city.

== Aftermath ==
The PAVN claim to have killed "hundreds of enemy troops" in the attack before being forced to withdraw due to heavy casualties and low ammunition.

Later on 31 January a US helicopter collected South Vietnamese President Nguyễn Văn Thiệu from his family home in Mỹ Tho and landed him at the JGS where together with Vice-President Nguyễn Cao Kỳ (whose home was located nearby) and Viên they coordinated the South Vietnamese response to the Tet Offensive over the following days.
