= Tet truce =

Annual holiday truce during the Vietnam War

The Tết truce was traditionally a time of ceasefire that occurred among the Democratic Republic of Vietnam, Viet Cong, the US and the Republic of Vietnam in honor of the Tết holiday.

Before the Tet Offensive, war parties had announced their voluntary unilateral truces without sharing agreement among them:

- The Democratic Republic of Vietnam: The Voice of Vietnam, on 19 October 1967, had announced that the DRV would enforce its ceasefire from 27 January 1968 at 01.00 AM (Hanoi mean time) to 03 February 1968 at 01.00 AM (Hanoi mean time).
- The National Liberation Front of South Vietnam (Viet Cong): The Voice of Liberation, on 17 November 1967, had announced that the Liberation Army of South Vietnam would enforce its ceasefire from 27 January 1968 at 01.00 AM (Hanoi mean time) to 03 February 1968 at 01.00 AM (Hanoi mean time).
- The US and the Republic of Vietnam: At the begin, the US army and the ARVN would enforce their ceasefire during 48 hours, from 00.00 AM of 30 January 1968 to 00.00 AM of 01 February 1968. However, their ceasefire was shortened to 36 hours on 08 January 1968, starting at 18.00 PM on 30 January 1968. On 26 January, the Joint Chiefs of Staff notified the Commander in Chief, Pacific Command and the Commander in Chief, Strategic Air Command of these exceptions to the 36-hour truce, which would begin at 18.00 PM on 29 January in II, III, and IV Corps. The truce excluded the I Corp and from the Vinh city of the North to the military line at the 17th parallel north. The ceasefire began on schedule, but was short-lived. Soon after midnight on the 29th, the Liberation Army of South Vietnam forces attacked key towns and installations in the truce's excluded zone of the southern I Corps. At 10.00 AM (Saigon mean time) on 30 January 1968, the RVN president Nguyễn Văn Thiệu formally cancelled the truce throughout South Vietnam, and both the US and ARVN commands placed all their forces on full alert. At the dawn of 31 January 1968, after the RVN's truce cancelation, the Liberation Army of South Vietnam launched its Tet Offensive throughout the South.
