= Monition =

In the U.S., monition refers to a summons.

In English law and the canon law of the Church of England, a monition, contraction of admonition, is an order to a member of the clergy to do or refrain from doing a specified act. Other than a rebuke, it is the least severe censure available against clergy of the Church of England. Failure to observe the order is an offence under the Ecclesiastical Jurisdiction Measure 1963. A monition can be imposed in person by a bishop or by an ecclesiastical court.

Historically, monitions of a disciplinary character were used to enforce residence on the holder of a benefice, or in connection with actions to restrain allegedly unlawful ritual practices under the Public Worship Regulation Act 1874. Disobedience to such monitions historically entailed the penalties of contempt of court.
