= Treason Act 1551 =

Act of the Parliament of England

Treason Act 1551 (Note: The citation of this act by this short title was authorised by section 5 of, and the second schedule to, the Statute Law Revision Act 1948. Due to the repeal of those provisions, it is now authorised by section 19(2) of the Interpretation Act 1978.)
- Act of Parliament
- Parliament of England
- Long title: An Acte for the punyshment of diverse Treasons. (Note: These words are printed against this act in the second column of the second schedule to the Statute Law Revision Act 1948, which is headed "Title".)
- Citation: 5 & 6 Edw. 6. c. 11
- Territorial extent: England and Wales

Dates
- Royal assent: 15 April 1552
- Commencement: 1 June 1552 (Note: Section 1.)
- Repealed: 30 July 1948
Other legislation
Amended by	Treason Act 1553; Statute Law Revision Act 1863; Statute Law Revision Act 1888; Administration of Estates Act 1925; Administration of Justice (Miscellaneous Provisions) Act 1938; Treason Act 1945
Repealed by	Statute Law Revision Act 1948
Relates to	Treasons Act 1534

Status: Repealed

Text of statute as originally enacted

The Treason Act 1551 (5 & 6 Edw. 6. c. 11) was an act of the Parliament of England.

The act was described as "purely procedural" by the House of Lords in R v Joyce, but in fact extended the definition of high treason. It became treason to seize one of the King's forts and then not surrender it within six days of being ordered to. This form of treason had originally been enacted in the Treasons Act 1534 (26 Hen. 8. c. 13) and then abolished by the Treason Act 1547 (1 Edw. 6. c. 12). It was soon abolished again by the Treason Act 1553 (1 Mar. Sess. 1. c. 1), but would be restored again by the Rebellion Act 1572 (this time without the 6 day deadline).

It was also made treason to say that the king was a heretic or usurper, in writing or (for the third offence only) in speech.

The act re-enacted some existing procedural rules in prosecutions for treason and misprision of treason. However the Act amended procedure by stating that a person accused of committing treason only by "open preaching or words" must be prosecuted within three months of the offence, instead of the 30-day limit previously established by the Treason Act 1547 (1 Edw. 6. c. 12).

The act also prohibited the widow of a man convicted of treason from claiming her dower.

== Repeal ==
The new kinds of treason created by this act were abolished by the Treason Act 1553 (1 Mar. Sess. 1. c. 1). The act has since been repealed.

Sections 1–3 and 7–9 of the act were repealed by section 1 of, and the schedule to, the Statute Law Revision Act 1863 (26 & 27 Vict. c. 125), which came into force on 28 July 1863.

Section 11 of the act was repealed on 1 January 1926 by section 56 of, and part I of the second schedule to, the Administration of Estates Act 1925 (15 & 16 Geo. 5. c. 23).

Section 20(3) of, and the fourth schedule to, the Administration of Justice (Miscellaneous Provisions) Act 1938 (1 & 2 Geo. 6. c. 63) made the following repeals on 1 January 1939: section 5; in section 4, the words from "and that all processes of outlawry" to the end; in section 6, the words "or process of outlawry".

Section 4 of the act was repealed on 15 June 1945 by section 2(1) of, and the schedule to, the Treason Act 1945 (8 & 9 Geo. 6. c. 44).

The preamble and sections 6 and 10 of this act were repealed on 30 July 1948 by section 1 of, and the first schedule to, the Statute Law Revision Act 1948.

== See also ==
- High treason in the United Kingdom
- Treason Act
