= 4th Parliament of Elizabeth I =

16th-century session of the English legislature

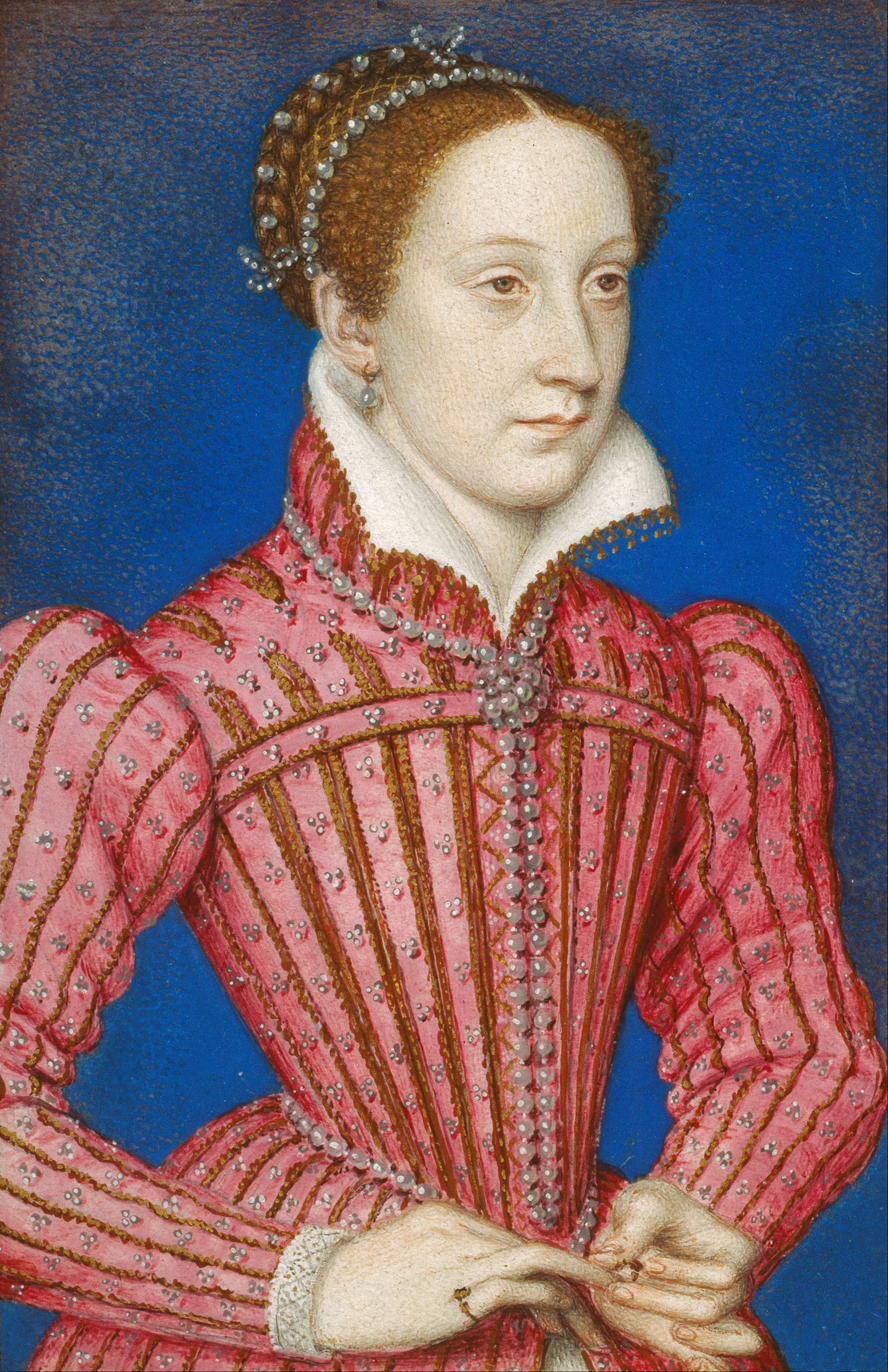
Mary Stuart, Queen of Scots

The 4th Parliament of Queen Elizabeth I was summoned by Queen Elizabeth I of England on 28 March 1572 and assembled on 8 May 1572.

The Parliament was called, following pressure from the Privy Council, to discuss the consequences of the Ridolfi plot, a Catholic conspiracy which had attempted to put Elizabeth's cousin, Mary Stuart (Queen of Scots), on the throne of England in her place. Robert Bell was installed as the Speaker of the House of Commons.

On 13 May 1572, at a joint committee of both Houses of Parliament (Upper and Lower), the Privy Council laid out their case against Mary, who was then under house arrest in the English Midlands under the charge of the Earl of Shrewsbury. They alleged that she had claimed the English crown, attempted to force the Catholic Duke of Norfolk to marry her and incited rebellion in the north of England. Last, but not least, they contended that she had, with the help of Roberto Ridolfi, the Pope’s secret agent, requested the Duke of Alba (governor of the Spanish Netherlands) and Philip II of Spain to invade the British Isles to overthrow Elizabeth. Parliament almost unanimously voted in favour of a proposal that Mary be executed, but Elizabeth turned down the idea in favour of simply removing Mary from the succession. She did however approve the execution of her second cousin Thomas Howard, 4th Duke of Norfolk, for his part in the conspiracy. The bill against Mary, although passed by Parliament on 25 June, was eventually rejected by Elizabeth.

Other debates on religious matters were stymied by Elizabeth's insistence that they must first be approved by the bishops. The only bill of any significance passed by the time the first session ended on 30 June 1572 concerned a revision of the 1563 Poor Law that had lapsed in 1571. The new legislation introduced compulsory levies for the poor, to be enforced by local, secular authorities.

The second session (8 Feb 1576 to 15 March 1576) was more productive in terms of legislation, with 37 bills enacted, covering such things as measures to reduce unemployment and an Act against informers. A further statute was added to the 1572 Poor Law for "setting the poor on work and for the avoiding of idleness," a proposal first made by Sir Francis Knollys in 1571 in an attempt to finance a general welfare system. During the second session of Parliament, Peter Wentworth, a prominent Protestant leader, gave a passionate speech in favor of free speech, which resulted in his imprisonment by the House of Commons. The queen released him before the end of the session.

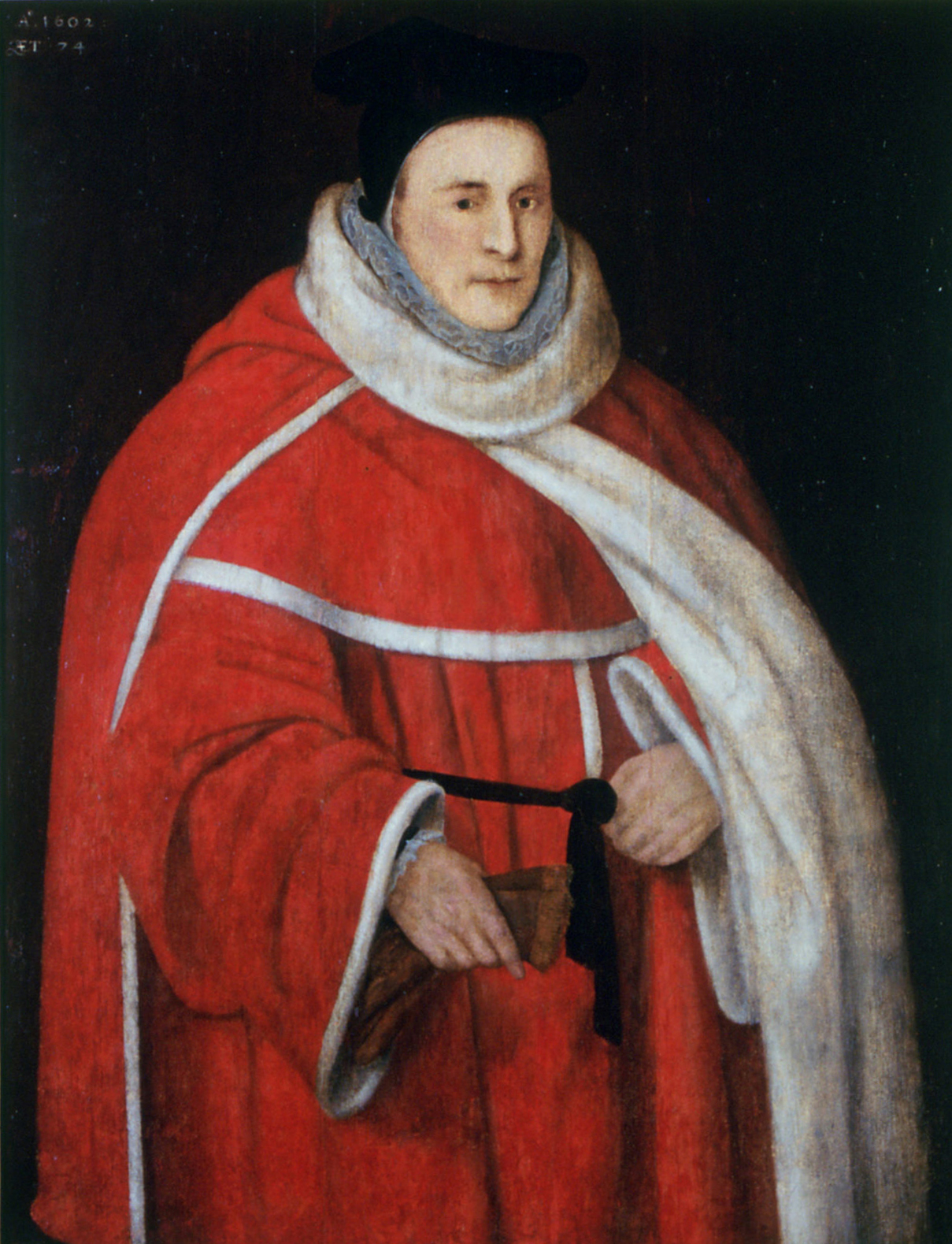
Sir John Popham, Speaker

The third and final session (16 Jan 1581 to 18 Mar 1581) was prompted by the activities of seminary priests and the Jesuit mission. Speaker Bell having died in the interim, Sir John Popham was installed in his place. A total of 17 statutes and 13 private measures received royal assent, including An Act against Sedition and a new Navigation Act. The session was then again prorogued (suspended) and only formally dissolved two years later on 19 April 1583.

== Notable acts of the Parliament ==
- Rebellion Act 1572
- Escape of Traitors Act 1572
- Vagabonds Act 1572
- Ecclesiastical Leases Act 1572
- Hospitals for the Poor Act 1572
- Poor Act 1575
- Common Informers Act 1575
- Benefit of Clergy Act 1575
- Ecclesiastical Leases Act 1575
- Rochester Bridge Act 1575
- Religion Act 1580

== See also ==
- List of acts of the 1st session of the 4th Parliament of Queen Elizabeth I
- List of acts of the 2nd session of the 4th Parliament of Queen Elizabeth I
- List of acts of the 3rd session of the 4th Parliament of Queen Elizabeth I
- List of parliaments of England
