= Treason Act 1351 =

Act of the Parliament of England

Treason Act 1351 (Note: The citation of this act by this short title was authorised by section 1 of, and schedule 1 to, the Short Titles Act 1896. Due to the repeal of those provisions, it is now authorised by section 19(2) of the Interpretation Act 1978.)
- Act of Parliament
- Parliament of England
- Long title: Declaration what Offences shall be adjudged Treason. (Note: These words are printed against this act in the second column of schedule 1 to the Short Titles Act 1896, which is headed "Title".)
- Citation: 25 Edw. 3 Stat. 5. c. 2
- Territorial extent: England and Wales; Ireland; Scotland

Dates
- Royal assent: 11 February 1352
- Commencement: 13 January 1352 (Note: Start of session.)
Other legislation
Amended by	Offences Against the Person Act 1828; Criminal Law (India) Act 1828; Offences Against the Person (Ireland) Act 1829; Forgery Act 1830; Coinage Offences Act 1832; Treason Felony Act 1848; Escheat (Procedure) Act 1887; Statute Law Revision Act 1948; Criminal Law Act 1967; Criminal Law Act (Northern Ireland) 1967; Succession to the Crown Act 2013
Relates to	Treason Act 1535; Treason Act (Ireland) 1765

Status: Amended

Text of statute as originally enacted

Revised text of statute as amended

The Treason Act 1351 (25 Edw. 3 Stat. 5. c. 2) is an act of the Parliament of England where, according to William Blackstone, common law treason offences were enumerated and no new offences were created. It is one of the earliest English statutes still in force, although it has been very significantly amended. It was extended to Ireland in 1495 and to Scotland in 1708. The act was passed at Westminster in the Hilary term of 1351, in the 25th year of the reign of Edward III and was entitled "A Declaration which Offences shall be adjudged Treason". It was passed to clarify precisely what was treason, as the definition under common law had been expanded rapidly by the courts until its scope was controversially wide. The act was last used to prosecute William Joyce, better known as "Lord Haw-Haw", in 1945 for collaborating with Germany in World War II.

The act is still in force in the United Kingdom. It is also still in force in some former British colonies, including New South Wales. Like other laws of the time, it was written in Norman French.

The act is the origin of the definition of treason in the United States (in Article III of the Constitution). Joseph Story wrote in his Commentaries on the Constitution of the United States that:

they have adopted the very words of the Statute of Treason of Edward the Third; and thus by implication, in order to cut off at once all chances of arbitrary constructions, they have recognized the well-settled interpretation of these phrases in the administration of criminal law, which has prevailed for ages.

== Origin ==
Until 1351 treason was defined by the common law. The king's judges gradually expanded the scope of treason under the pretext that any "assortment of royal power", by which was meant doing anything which only the king (or his officers) could legally do, was considered treason – even hunting deer in the king's forests. When in 1348, Sir John Gerberge of Royston was convicted of treason for falsely imprisoning William de Boletisford and taking his horse, until he paid him £90 (approximately equivalent to £70,000 in 2025), the barons compelled Edward III to agree to an Act of Parliament to restrict the definition of treason to definite limits.

Joseph Story wrote: "This statute has ever since remained the pole star of English jurisprudence upon this subject." Although some of the treason statutes enacted between 1352 and 1640 lost their importance over time, notably those of Henry VIII regarding his supremacy, 25 Edw. 3 was the law in force cited by judges during the reign of Charles I. When Thomas Wentworth, 1st Earl of Strafford was charged with high treason his attorney argued "the statute ever makes the Treason", insisting Strafford had not committed treason by the statute 25 Edw. 3. Despite an accusation of common law treason, since Treason by statute could not be proven, the House of Commons passed a bill of attainder against Strafford, who was subsequently executed, over the objections of the king.

== Provisions ==
The act distinguished two varieties of treason: high treason and petty treason (or petit treason), the first being disloyalty to the Sovereign, and the second being disloyalty to a subject. The practical distinction was the consequence of being convicted: for a high treason, the penalty was death by hanging, drawing and quartering (for a man) or drawing and burning (for a woman), and the traitor's property would escheat to the Crown; in the case of a petty treason the penalty was drawing and hanging without quartering, or burning without drawing; and property escheated only to the traitor's immediate lord.

A person was guilty of high treason under the act if that person:

- "compassed or imagined" (i.e. planned; the original Norman French is "fait compasser ou ymaginer") the death of the king, his wife or his eldest son and heir (following the coming into force of the Succession to the Crown Act 2013 on 26 March 2015, this has effect as if the reference were to the eldest child and heir);
- violated the king's companion, the king's eldest daughter if she was unmarried or the wife of the king's eldest son and heir (following the coming into force of the Succession to the Crown Act 2013, this has effect as if the reference were to the eldest son only if he is also the heir);
- levied war against the king in his realm;
- adhered to the king's enemies in his realm, giving them aid and comfort in his realm or elsewhere;
- counterfeited the Great Seal or the Privy Seal (repealed and re-enacted in the Forgery Act 1830 (11 Geo. 4 & 1 Will. 4. c. 66); death penalty abolished in 1832; reduced to felony in 1861 (except in Scotland));
- counterfeited English coinage or imported counterfeit English coinage (reduced to felony in 1832);
- killed the Chancellor, Treasurer (this office has long been vacant), one of the king's justices (either of the King's Bench or the Common Pleas), a justice in eyre, an assize judge, and "all other Justices", while they are performing their offices. (This did not include the barons of the Exchequer.)

The penalty for counterfeiting coins was the same as for petty treason. The offence had previously been called petty treason, before the Act elevated it to high treason.

Under the act petty treason was the murder of one's lawful superior: that is if a servant killed his master or his master's wife, a wife killed her husband or a clergyman killed his prelate. This offence was abolished in 1828.

The act originally envisaged that further forms of treason would arise that would not be covered by the act, so it legislated for this possibility. The words from "et pr ceo q plusurs auts cases de semblable treson" onwards have been translated as:

And because that many other like Cases of Treason may happen in Time to come, which a Man cannot think nor declare at this present Time; it is accorded, That if any other Case, supposed Treason, which is not above specified, doth happen before any Justices, the Justices shall tarry without any going to Judgement of the Treason till the Cause be shewed and declared before the King and his Parliament, whether it ought to be judged Treason or other Felony.

== The act in Scotland ==
Following the union of England and Scotland by the Acts of Union 1707, Scotland continued to have its own treason laws until the Treason Act 1708 (7 Ann. c. 21) abolished Scottish treason law and extended English treason law to Scotland. Sections 12 and 11 of the 1708 act made it treason to counterfeit the Great Seal of Scotland and to kill the Scottish Lords of Session and Lords of Justiciary (in addition to forging the British – formerly English – seal, and killing English judges), respectively. However while in England and Ireland forgery of the seal of Great Britain ceased to be treason under the Forgery Act 1861 (24 & 25 Vict. c. 98), the 1861 act did not apply to Scotland. Also, forging the Scottish seal is still treason in Scotland, but has not been treason in England or Ireland since 1861.

The 1351 act still applies in Scotland today, and is a reserved matter which the Scottish Parliament has no power to modify.

== Interpretation ==
Although the first kind of treason is described as "compassing", the offence does not consist of purely thinking. A subsequent clause which requires that an "overt act" must also be proven has been held by judges to apply to all kinds of treason.

Adhering to "enemies" does not include adhering to rebels or pirates.

During the trial of Roger Casement, who in 1916 was accused of collaborating with Germany during World War I, the defence argued that the act applied only to activities carried out on British soil, while Casement had committed the acts of collaboration outside Britain. However, closer reading of the originally unpunctuated medieval document allowed for a broader interpretation, leading to the accusation by his supporters that Casement was "hanged by a comma". The court decided that a comma should be read in the text, crucially widening the sense so that "in the realm or elsewhere" meant where acts were done and not just where the "King's enemies" might be.

== Subsequent developments ==
The act was extended to Ireland by Poynings' Law 1495 (10 Hen. 7. c. 22 (I)).

The Treason Act 1535 (27 Hen. 8. c. 2) expanded the definition of treason to include forgery of the king's signet or sign-manual, which Sir Geoffrey Elton argued was demanded by administrative methods new since this act.

The act was extended to Scotland by the Treason Act 1708 (7 Ann. c. 21).

So much of the act "as relates to forging or counterfeiting the Queen's Sign Manual Privy Signet or Privy Seal" was repealed by section 31 of the Forgery Act 1830 (11 Geo. 4 & 1 Will. 4. c. 66) , which came into force on 21 July 1830.

So much of the act "as relates to counterfeiting the King's Money and to bringing false Money into this Realm" was repealed by section 1 of the Coinage Offences Act 1832 (2 & 3 Will. 4. c. 34).

The forfeiture provisions of the act were repealed by the Forfeiture Act 1870 (33 & 34 Vict. c. 23), and the penalty was reduced to life imprisonment by the Crime and Disorder Act 1998.

The clause beginning "et pr ceo q plusurs" was repealed by section 1 of, and the first schedule to, the Statute Law Revision Act 1948 (11 & 12 Geo. 6. c. 62), which came into force on 30 July 1948.

The whole act was repealed for New Zealand by section 412(1) of, and schedule 2 to, the Crimes Act 1961, which came into force on 1 January 1962.

The clause beginning "Et si per cas" (clarifying that robbery and kidnapping were not treason) was repealed for England and Wales by section 10(2) of, and part I of schedule 3 to, the Criminal Law Act 1967, which came into force on 1 January 1968, and for Northern Ireland by section 15(2) of, and schedule 2 to, the Criminal Law Act (Northern Ireland) 1967, which came into force on 1 January 1968.

The whole act was repealed for the Republic of Ireland by section 1 of, and part II of the schedule to, the Statute Law Revision Act 1983, which came into force on 16 May 1983.

== See also ==
- Treason
- High treason in the United Kingdom
- Treason Act
- Treason Act 1495 (special defence to treason)
- Treason Act 1535 (further forms of treason)
- Treason Act 1695 (statute of limitations)
- Treason Act 1702 (further form of treason)
- Treason Act 1708 (further forms of treason)
- Treason Act 1814 (the penalty for treason)
- Treason Act 1842 (alternative offences)
- Treason Felony Act 1848 (still-existing offences which used to be treason)
