= Treason Act 1423 =

Act of the Parliament of England

- Act of Parliament
- Parliament of England
- Long title: Persons indicted of high treason escaping out of prison shall be adjudged traitors.
- Citation: 2 Hen. 6. c. 21
- Territorial extent: England and Wales; Ireland

Dates
- Royal assent: 1423 by Henry VI
- Commencement: 20 October 1423 (Note: Section 1.)
- Repealed: England and Wales: 28 July 1863; Ireland: 10 August 1872

Other legislation
- Amended by: Treason Act 1547
- Repealed by: England and Wales: Statute Law Revision Act 1863; Ireland: Statute Law (Ireland) Revision Act 1872
- Relates to: Treason Act 1351; Escape of Traitors Act 1572

Status: Repealed

Text of statute as originally enacted

The Treason Act 1423 (2 Hen. 6. c. 21), also known as the Escape Act 1423, was an act of the Parliament of England that made it high treason for a person who had been indicted for treason to escape from prison (whether they were guilty of the original allegation of treason or not).

The act is chapter 17 in Ruffhead's edition.

== Subsequent developments ==
The act was extended to Ireland by Poynings' Law 1495 (10 Hen. 7. c. 22 (I)).

This form of treason was abolished for England and Wales by the Treason Act 1547 (1 Edw. 6. c. 12).

The whole act was repealed for England and Wales by section 1 of, and the schedule to, the Statute Law Revision Act 1863 (26 & 27 Vict. c. 125), which came into force on 28 July 1863.

The whole act was repealed for Ireland by section 1 of, and the schedule to, the Statute Law (Ireland) Revision Act 1872 (35 & 36 Vict. c. 98), which came into force on 10 August 1872.

== See also ==
- Escape of Traitors Act 1572
- High treason in the United Kingdom
