= Treason Act 1535 =

Act of the Parliament of England

- Act of Parliament
- Parliament of England
- Long title: An Act concerning the Forging of the King's Sign Manual, Signet and Privy Seal.
- Citation: 27 Hen. 8. c. 2
- Territorial extent: England and Wales

Dates
- Royal assent: 14 April 1536
- Commencement: 4 February 1536 (Note: Start of session.)
- Repealed: 28 July 1863
Other legislation
Amended by	Treason Act 1553
Repealed by	Statute Law Revision Act 1863
Relates to	Treason Act 1351; Treason Act 1547; Treason (No. 2) Act 1553

Status: Repealed

Text of statute as originally enacted

The Treason Act 1535 (27 Hen. 8. c. 2), also known as the Forging the Sign-manual, etc. Act 1535, was an act of the Parliament of England passed during the reign of King Henry VIII of England in 1535.

It made it high treason to counterfeit the Privy Seal, Signet or royal sign-manual.

== Commentary ==
Sir Geoffrey Elton argued that the extension of the definition of treason to include forgery of the king's signet or sign-manual by this act was demanded by administrative methods new since the Treason Act 1351 (25 Edw. 3 Stat. 5. c. 2).

The act was also acknowledged as an important milestone for the recognition of the importance of authenticity and legitimacy in the Tudor period, given that high treason was punishable by death.

== Subsequent developments ==
The act was virtually repealed by the Treason Act 1553 (1 Mar. Sess. 1. c. 1), but another act passed later in the same year, the Treason (No. 2) Act 1553 (1 Mar. Sess. 2. c. 6) recreated the offence.

The whole act was repealed by section 1 of, and the schedule to, the Statute Law Revision Act 1863 (26 & 27 Vict. c. 125), which came into force on 28 July 1863.

== See also ==
- High treason in the United Kingdom
