= John William Bean =

English criminal (1824-1882)

- Born: 1824; Holborn, Middlesex, United Kingdom
- Died: 19 July 1882 (aged 57–58); Camberwell, Surrey, United Kingdom
- Occupation: News vendor
- Known for: Attempted assassination of Queen Victoria
- Motive: Desire for penal transportation
- Criminal charge: Misdemeanour assault
- Penalty: 18 months' imprisonment

Details
- Date: 3 July 1842
- Date apprehended: 3 July 1842
- Imprisoned at: Millbank Prison

John William Bean (1824 – 19 July 1882) was a British criminal and mental patient. He was most known for attempting in 1842 to assassinate Queen Victoria with a gun loaded with paper and tobacco. Born a dwarf with a hunchback, Bean shot at the Queen because he wanted to be transported to a penal colony as he was unhappy with his life in England. Instead he was sentenced to 18 months' imprisonment for misdemeanour assault. Bean died in 1882 after committing suicide.

== Early life ==
Bean was born in Holborn, Middlesex, the son of a jeweller and metalsmith. He was born with a hunchback and dwarfism. He attempted to join working with his father in the forge but was unable to keep up with the physical requirements for the work. He also had failed apprenticeships with a cheesemonger and at Her Majesty's Stationery Office. Bean became fascinated by stories of Edward Oxford who had attempted to assassinate Queen Victoria. He sold his Bible and other books in order to buy a second-hand flintlock pistol for 3 shillings in the hopes of emulating him.

== Assassination attempt ==
On 3 July 1842, Bean was on The Mall when Queen Victoria was passing on her way from Buckingham Palace to the Chapel Royal at St James's Palace. Bean went to the front of the crowd, drew his gun and fired at the Queen. However the gun misfired as it had mostly been loaded with paper and tobacco. Immediately, Bean was grabbed by the wrist by Charles Edward Dassett who took him over to two nearby policemen, Constables Hearn and Calxston. Dassett showed them Bean's gun and stated that Bean had just fired it at the Queen. The policemen laughed at the accusation and said they could not charge him due to lack of evidence. Dassett kept the gun and was arrested in Green Park later in possession of it, but told the police about Bean. Dassett's testimony was supported by witnesses from the scene of the crime. The description given of Bean was that of a hunchback, so the majority of hunchbacks in London ended up getting arrested as a result. Bean was arrested later the same day at his home in Clerkenwell. The two policemen were suspended from duty for not taking Dassett's accusation seriously.

== Court case ==
Bean was initially charged with high treason but this was later reduced to a misdemeanour of assaulting the Queen. This was done on the grounds that the Metropolitan Police believed he was just attention seeking and thought the newspapers would pay less attention to the case if it was a lesser charge. Bean claimed that he had not intended to kill the Queen and that she was in no danger as he claimed he had actually aimed at the ground rather than at her. Bean stated he wanted to be transported to Australia as he was tired of his life in England. Usually for a misdemeanour, Bean would have been given the opportunity for bail, however Bean refused to name anyone who might provide the required surety. Bean did not talk during his father's visits except to send his love to his mother.

The case was heard on 25 August 1842 at the Old Bailey before Lord Arbinger with the Attorney General Sir Frederick Pollock and Solicitor General Sir William Webb Follett, prosecuting. Bean's defence barrister, Sidney Calder Horry, put forward the defence that the trial was double jeopardy as he said Bean should have been charged with high treason for assaulting the Queen. He also argued that the Queen was not distressed or aware of the attempt so there was no assault. Lord Arbinger responded to these arguments during his summing up citing that a man had previously been indicted for grinning at King George III. In response to the claim the Queen needed to be aware for there to be an assault, Lord Arbinger asked the jury "Is it not assault to point a loaded gun at a man when he is asleep?".

The prosecution presented several witnesses, including Dassett, to testify against Bean. Horry presented two eyewitnesses but they were largely dismissed by Lord Arbinger. One claimed he did not see Dassett or Bean when Bean fired. The other, Thomas Vosper, claimed that he had been staring at Bean's gun for fifteen minutes but he did nothing about it, testifying to the court "I wanted to see the result." Lord Arbinger said that would have made Vosper guilty of misprision of treason but left it to the jury to decide the weight of the evidence that contradicted Dassett's testimony. Horry also called a number of character witnesses, including Bean's father, to testify to Bean's character. Bean was found guilty. The jury did not leave the jury box to deliberate before pronouncing their verdict. Lord Arbinger sentenced Bean to 18 months' imprisonment as that was the harshest sentence he could impose under English common law. He sentenced Bean initially to be imprisoned at Newgate Prison but this was later changed to Millbank Prison. A large crowd gathered to observe proceedings. The trial took six hours to complete.

Following the case, the Queen's husband Prince Albert felt that treasonable acts which were factually harmless which resulted in a death penalty were too harsh. Accordingly, he asked Parliament to make a law to recognise minor treason offences that did not carry the death penalty. That wish was fulfilled with the passage of the Treason Act 1842.

== Later life and death ==
When Bean was released, he became a newspaper seller and jeweller. He would get married twice and had a son called Samuel in 1849. In 1877 he was confined to a lunatic asylum. On 19 July 1882, Bean was found dead at his home in Camberwell after consuming a large amount of opium from a bottle labelled "poison". He left a suicide note stating he committed suicide because he felt he "was an incumbrance to his wife". A coroner's inquiry at St Thomas' Hospital found for a verdict of death by suicide caused by temporary insanity.
