= List of acts of the Parliament of England from 1546 =

This is a list of acts of the Parliament of England for the year 1546.

For acts passed during the period 1707–1800, see the list of acts of the Parliament of Great Britain. See also the list of acts of the Parliament of Scotland, and the list of acts of the Parliament of Ireland.

For acts passed from 1801 onwards, see the list of acts of the Parliament of the United Kingdom. For acts of the devolved parliaments and assemblies in the United Kingdom, see the list of acts of the Scottish Parliament, the list of acts of the Northern Ireland Assembly, and the list of acts and measures of Senedd Cymru; see also the list of acts of the Parliament of Northern Ireland.

For medieval statutes, etc. that are not considered to be acts of Parliament, see the list of English statutes.

See also the List of ordinances and acts of the Parliament of England, 1642–1660 for ordinances and acts passed by the Long Parliament and other bodies without royal assent, and which were not considered to be valid legislation following the Restoration in 1660.

The number shown after each act's title is its chapter number. Acts are cited using this number, preceded by the years of the reign during which the relevant parliamentary session was held; thus the Union with Ireland Act 1800 is cited as "39 & 40 Geo. 3. c. 67", meaning the 67th act passed during the session that started in the 39th year of the reign of George III and which finished in the 40th year of that reign. The modern convention is to use Arabic numerals in citations (thus "41 Geo. 3" rather than "41 Geo. III"). Acts of the last session of the Parliament of Great Britain and the first session of the Parliament of the United Kingdom are both cited as "41 Geo. 3".

Acts passed by the Parliament of England did not have a short title; however, some of these acts have subsequently been given a short title by acts of the Parliament of the United Kingdom, such as the Short Titles Act 1896 (59 & 60 Vict. c. 14).

Acts passed by the Parliament of England were deemed to have come into effect on the first day of the session in which they were passed. Because of this, the years given in the list below may in fact be the year before a particular act was passed.

== 38 Hen. 8 ==
The second session of the 9th Parliament of King Henry VIII, which met from 14 January 1547 until 31 January 1547.

This session was also traditionally cited as 38 H. 8.

No public acts were passed during this session.

=== Private acts ===
Short title	Citation	Royal assent
Long title
Attainder of Duke of Norfolk and Earl of Surrey Act 1546 (repealed)	38 Hen. 8. c. 1 Pr. (Note: This is the citation in The Statutes of the Realm.); 37 Hen. 8. c. 8 Pr. (Note: This is the citation in The Statutes at Large.)	27 January 1547
An Act for the attainder of the duke of Norfolk and the earl of Surry. (Repealed by Duke of Norfolk's Restitution Act 1553 (1 Mar. Sess. 2. c. 13 Pr.))

=== Sources ===
- Journal of the House of Lords. Vol. 1: 1509-1577. London: His Majesty's Stationery Office. 1830 – via British History Online.
- "Chronological Tables of the Private and Personal Acts: Part 1 (1539–1601)". legislation.gov.uk. The National Archives.

== See also ==
- List of acts of the Parliament of England
