= Treasons Act 1534 =

Act of the Parliament of England

- Act of Parliament
- Parliament of England
- Long title: An Act whereby divers Offenses be made High Treason; and taking away all Sanctuaries for all manner of High Treason.
- Citation: 26 Hen. 8. c. 13
- Territorial extent: England and Wales

Dates
- Royal assent: 18 December 1534
- Commencement: 1 February 1535 (Note: Section 1.)
- Repealed: 28 July 1863

Other legislation
- Amended by: Treasons Act 1571
- Repealed by: Statute Law Revision Act 1863
- Relates to: Act of Supremacy 1534; Treason Act (Ireland) 1537; Treason Act 1543; Treason Act 1547; Treason Act 1551; Treason Act 1553

Status: Repealed

Text of statute as originally enacted

The Treasons Act 1534 or High Treason Act 1534 (26 Hen. 8. c. 13) was an act of the Parliament of England passed in 1534, during the reign of King Henry VIII.

== Background ==
This act was passed after the Act of Supremacy 1534 (26 Hen. 8. c. 1), which made the king the "Only Head of the Church of England on Earth so far as the Law of God allows."

== The act ==
The act made it treason, punishable by death, to disavow the Act of Supremacy 1534 (26 Hen. 8. c. 1). Sir Thomas More was executed under this Act. It was introduced as a blanket law in order to deal with the minority of cases who would refuse to accept Cromwell's and Henry's changes in policies, instead of using the more traditional method of attainders.

The act specified that all those were guilty of high treason who:

do maliciously wish, will or desire by words or writing, or by craft imagine, invent, practise, or attempt any bodily harm to be done or committed to the king's most royal person, the queen's or the heirs apparent [Elizabeth], or to deprive them of any of their dignity, title or name of their royal estates, or slanderously and maliciously publish and pronounce, by express writing or words, that the king should be heretic, schismatic, tyrant, infidel or usurper of the crown...

The word 'maliciously' was added in several cases to require evil intent, and the act meant that it was very dangerous to say anything against what the King had done. The act also made it treason to rebelliously keep or withhold from the King his castles, forts, ships, or artillery, and to fail to surrender any of them within six days of being commanded to do so. It also abolished sanctuary for those accused of high treason.

== Subsequent developments ==
The act was superseded and virtually repealed by the Treason Act 1543 (35 Hen. 8. c. 2) and the Forestallers Act 1551 (5 & 6 Edw. 6. c. 14)).

The whole act was repealed by section 1 of, and the schedule to, the Statute Law Revision Act 1863 (26 & 27 Vict. c. 125), which came into force on 28 July 1863.

== See also ==
- Treason Act 1551
- High treason in the United Kingdom
