= List of acts of the Parliament of England from 1535 =

This is a list of acts of the Parliament of England for the year 1535.

For acts passed during the period 1707–1800, see the list of acts of the Parliament of Great Britain. See also the list of acts of the Parliament of Scotland, and the list of acts of the Parliament of Ireland.

For acts passed from 1801 onwards, see the list of acts of the Parliament of the United Kingdom. For acts of the devolved parliaments and assemblies in the United Kingdom, see the list of acts of the Scottish Parliament, the list of acts of the Northern Ireland Assembly, and the list of acts and measures of Senedd Cymru; see also the list of acts of the Parliament of Northern Ireland.

For medieval statutes, etc. that are not considered to be acts of Parliament, see the list of English statutes.

See also the List of ordinances and acts of the Parliament of England, 1642–1660 for ordinances and acts passed by the Long Parliament and other bodies without royal assent, and which were not considered to be valid legislation following the Restoration in 1660.

The number shown after each act's title is its chapter number. Acts are cited using this number, preceded by the years of the reign during which the relevant parliamentary session was held; thus the Union with Ireland Act 1800 is cited as "39 & 40 Geo. 3. c. 67", meaning the 67th act passed during the session that started in the 39th year of the reign of George III and which finished in the 40th year of that reign. The modern convention is to use Arabic numerals in citations (thus "41 Geo. 3" rather than "41 Geo. III"). Acts of the last session of the Parliament of Great Britain and the first session of the Parliament of the United Kingdom are both cited as "41 Geo. 3".

Acts passed by the Parliament of England did not have a short title; however, some of these acts have subsequently been given a short title by acts of the Parliament of the United Kingdom, such as the Short Titles Act 1896 (59 & 60 Vict. c. 14).

Acts passed by the Parliament of England were deemed to have come into effect on the first day of the session in which they were passed. Because of this, the years given in the list below may in fact be the year before a particular act was passed.

== 27 Hen. 8 ==
The seventh session of the 5th Parliament of King Henry VIII (the Reformation Parliament) which met from 4 February 1536 until 14 April 1536.

This session was also traditionally cited as 27 H. 8.

Note that cc. 29–59, 61–63 were traditionally cited as private acts cc. 1–31, 32–34 respectively, and that c. 60 was not included in traditional collections of acts.

Short title	Citation	Royal assent
Long title
Rebuilding in Various Towns Act 1535 (repealed)	27 Hen. 8. c. 1	14 April 1536
An Act for Re-edifying of divers Towns in the Realm. (Repealed by Statute Law (Repeals) Act 1993 (c. 50))
Forging the Sign-manual, etc. Act 1535 or the Treason Act 1535 (repealed)	27 Hen. 8. c. 2	14 April 1536
An Act concerning the Forging of the King's Sign Manual, Signet and Privy Seal. (Repealed by Treason Act 1553 (1 Mar. Sess. 1. c. 1))
Kingston upon Hull Act 1535 (repealed)	27 Hen. 8. c. 3	14 April 1536
An Act for avoiding of Exactions taken at Kyngston upon Hull. (Repealed by Hull Corporation (Fishermen) Act 1541 (33 Hen. 8. c. 33))
Offences at Sea Act 1535 (repealed)	27 Hen. 8. c. 4	14 April 1536
An Act concerning Pirates and Robbers of the Sea. (Repealed by Statute Law Revision Act 1863 (26 & 27 Vict. c. 125))
Justice of the Peace (Chester and Wales) Act 1535 (repealed)	27 Hen. 8. c. 5	14 April 1536
An Act for the making of Justices of Peace in Wales. (Repealed by Statute Law Revision Act 1887 (50 & 51 Vict. c. 59))
Breed of Horses Act 1535 (repealed)	27 Hen. 8. c. 6	14 April 1536
An Act concerning the Breed of Horses. (Repealed by Statute Law Revision Act 1863 (26 & 27 Vict. c. 125))
Forests in Wales Act 1535 (repealed)	27 Hen. 8. c. 7	14 April 1536
An Act for the Abuses in the Forests of Wales. (Repealed by Wild Creatures and Forest Laws Act 1971 (c. 47))
First Fruits and Tenths Act 1535 (repealed)	27 Hen. 8. c. 8	14 April 1536
An Act for Discharge of Payment of the Tenth in that Year in which they pay their First Fruits. (Repealed for England and Wales by First Fruits and Tenths Measure 1926 (16 & 17 Geo. 5. No. 5) and for the Isle of Man by Statute Law Revision (Isle of Man) Act 1991 (c. 61))
Butchers Act 1535 (repealed)	27 Hen. 8. c. 9	14 April 1536
An Act licensing all Butchers for a time to sell Vytell in Grose at their Pleasure. (Repealed by Statute Law Revision Act 1863 (26 & 27 Vict. c. 125))
Statute of Uses Act 1535 (repealed)	27 Hen. 8. c. 10	14 April 1536
An Act concerning Uses and Wills. (Repealed by Law of Property Act 1925 (15 & 16 Geo. 5. c. 20))
Clerks of the Signet and Privy Seal Act 1535 (repealed)	27 Hen. 8. c. 11	14 April 1536
An Act concerning Clerks of the Signet and Privy Seal. (Repealed by Great Seal Act 1884 (47 & 48 Vict. c. 30))
Woollen Cloths Act 1535 (repealed)	27 Hen. 8. c. 12	14 April 1536
An Act for true making of Woollen Clothes. (Repealed by Woollen Manufacture Act 1809 (49 Geo. 3. c. 109))
Exportation Act 1535 (repealed)	27 Hen. 8. c. 13	14 April 1536
An Act that White Woollen Cloths of Four Pounds and under, and coloured Cloths of Three Pounds and under, may be from henceforth carried over the Sea. (Repealed by Woollen Manufacture Act 1810 (50 Geo. 3. c. 83), confirmed by Repeal of Acts Concerning Importation Act 1822 (3 Geo. 4. c. 41))
Customs Act 1535 (repealed)	27 Hen. 8. c. 14	14 April 1536
An Act concerning the Custom of Leather. (Repealed by Repeal of Acts Concerning Importation Act 1822 (3 Geo. 4. c. 41))
Ecclesiastical Canons Act 1535 (repealed)	27 Hen. 8. c. 15	14 April 1536
An Act whereby the King's Majesty shall have Power to nominate Thirty two Persons of his Clergy and Lay Fee for making of Ecclesiastical Laws. (Repealed by Second Statute of Repeal (1 & 2 Ph. & M. c. 8))
Statute of Enrolments or the Enrolment of Bargains of Lands, etc. Act 1535 (repealed)	27 Hen. 8. c. 16	14 April 1536
An Act concerning Inrollments of Bargains and Contracts of Lands and Tenements. (Repealed by Law of Property (Amendment) Act 1924 (15 & 16 Geo. 5. c. 5))
Embezzlement Act 1535 (repealed)	27 Hen. 8. c. 17	14 April 1536
An Act concerning such as be put in Trust by their Masters, and after do rob them. (Repealed by Statute Law Revision Act 1863 (26 & 27 Vict. c. 125))
Thames Conservancy Ships' Ballast, etc. Act 1535 (repealed)	27 Hen. 8. c. 18	14 April 1536
An Act for the Preservation of the River of Thames. (Repealed by Statute Law Revision Act 1948 (11 & 12 Geo. 6. c. 62))
Sanctuary Act 1535 (repealed)	27 Hen. 8. c. 19	14 April 1536
An Act limiting an Order for Sanctuaries and Sanctuary Persons. (Repealed by Statute Law Revision Act 1863 (26 & 27 Vict. c. 125))
Tithes Act 1535 (repealed)	27 Hen. 8. c. 20	14 April 1536
An Act containing an Order for Tithes throughout the Realm. (Repealed by Statute Law Revision Act 1887 (50 & 51 Vict. c. 59))
Tithes (London) Act 1535 (repealed)	27 Hen. 8. c. 21	14 April 1536
An Act limiting an Order for Payment of Tithes within the City of London. (Repealed by Statute Law Revision Act 1948 (11 & 12 Geo. 6. c. 62))
Tillage Act 1535 (repealed)	27 Hen. 8. c. 22	14 April 1536
An Act concerning Decay of Houses and Inclosures. (Repealed by Continuance, etc. of Laws Act 1623 (21 Jas. 1. c. 28))
Tin (Ports in Devon and Cornwall) Act 1535 (repealed)	27 Hen. 8. c. 23	14 April 1536
An Act for the Preservation of Havens and Ports in the Counties of Devon and Cornwall. (Repealed by Statute Law (Repeals) Act 1978 (c. 45))
Jurisdiction in Liberties Act 1535 or the Act of Resumption 1536 (repealed)	27 Hen. 8. c. 24	14 April 1536
An Act for continuing of certain Liberties and Franchises heretofore taken from the Crown. (Repealed by Courts Act 1971 (c. 23))
Vagabonds Act 1535 (repealed)	27 Hen. 8. c. 25	14 April 1536
An Act for Punishment of sturdy Vagabonds and Beggars. (Repealed by Statute Law Revision Act 1863 (26 & 27 Vict. c. 125))
Laws in Wales Act 1535 or the Act of Union 1535 (repealed)	27 Hen. 8. c. 26	14 April 1536
An Act for Laws and Justice to be ministered in Wales in like Form as it is in this Realm. (Repealed by Welsh Language Act 1993 (c. 38))
Court of Augmentations Act 1535 (repealed)	27 Hen. 8. c. 27	14 April 1536
An Act establishing the Court of Augmentations. (Repealed by Statute Law Revision Act 1863 (26 & 27 Vict. c. 125))
Suppression of Religious Houses Act 1535 or the Dissolution of Lesser Monasteries Act 1535 or the First Suppression Act (repealed)	27 Hen. 8. c. 28	14 April 1536
An Act that all Religious Houses under the yearly Revenue of Two hundred Pounds shall be dissolved and given to the King and his Heirs. (Repealed by Continuance, etc. of Laws Act 1623 (21 Jas. 1. c. 28), Statute Law Revision Act 1948 (11 & 12 Geo. 6. c. 62) and Statute Law (Repeals) Act 1969 (c. 52))
Assurance of Manor of Grenes Norton Act 1535 (repealed)	27 Hen. 8. c. 29 (Note: This is the citation in The Statutes of the Realm.); 27 Hen. 8. c. 35 Pr. (Note: This is the citation in The Statutes at Large.)	14 April 1536
An Act concerning the Manor of Greens Norton. (Repealed by Statute Law (Repeals) Act 1978 (c. 45))
Jointure of Lady Elizabeth Vaux Act 1535 (repealed)	27 Hen. 8. c. 30; 27 Hen. 8. c. 2 Pr.	14 April 1536
An Act concerning the Assurance of certain Lands to the Lady Elizabeth Vaux, for her Jointure. (Repealed by Statute Law (Repeals) Act 1978 (c. 45))
Lands of Lord Awdeley Act 1535 (repealed)	27 Hen. 8. c. 31; 27 Hen. 8. c. 3 Pr.	14 April 1536
An Act concerning the Assurance of certain Lands to the King and his Heirs, lately belonging to the Lord Awdeley. (Repealed by Statute Law (Repeals) Act 1978 (c. 45))
Agreement, Earl of Rutland and City of York Act 1535 (repealed)	27 Hen. 8. c. 32; 27 Hen. 8. c. 4 Pr.	14 April 1536
An Act for Confirmation of an Agreement made between the Earl of Rutland and the Mayor and Commonalty of the City of York. (Repealed by Statute Law (Repeals) Act 1978 (c. 45))
Exchange of Lands, King, Duke of Norfolk and Prior of Thetford Act 1535 (repealed)	27 Hen. 8. c. 33; 27 Hen. 8. c. 5 Pr.	14 April 1536
An Act concerning an Exchange of certain Lands between the King and the Duke of Norfolk, and the Prior and Covent of Thetford. (Repealed by Statute Law (Repeals) Act 1978 (c. 45))
Exchange of Lands, King and Archbishop of Canterbury Act 1535 (repealed)	27 Hen. 8. c. 34; 27 Hen. 8. c. 6 Pr.	14 April 1536
An Act concerning an Exchange between the King and the Archbishop of Canterbury. (Repealed by Statute Law (Repeals) Act 1978 (c. 45))
Land Reclamation (Wapping Marsh) Act 1535 (repealed)	27 Hen. 8. c. 35; 27 Hen. 8. c. 7 Pr.	14 April 1536
An Act concerning the Assurance of the Moiety of Lands lately inned by Cornelius Vanderdelfe, lying by St. Katherine near the Tower of London, unto Richard Hill and his Heirs. (Repealed by Statute Law Revision Act 1948 (11 & 12 Geo. 6. c. 62))
Jointure of Lady Clifford Act 1535 (repealed)	27 Hen. 8. c. 36; 27 Hen. 8. c. 8 Pr.	14 April 1536
An Act concerning the Assurance of the Lady Elanor Clifford's Jointure. (Repealed by Statute Law (Repeals) Act 1978 (c. 45))
Pardon to Duke of Suffolk Act 1535 (repealed)	27 Hen. 8. c. 37; 27 Hen. 8. c. 9 Pr.	14 April 1536
An Act containing a Pardon granted to the Duke of Suffolk, and others, for Debt. (Repealed by Statute Law (Repeals) Act 1978 (c. 45))
Exchange of Lands, King, Duke of Suffolk and Earl of Northumberland Act 1535 (repealed)	27 Hen. 8. c. 38; 27 Hen. 8. c. 10 Pr.	14 April 1536
An Act concerning an Exchange of certain Lands between the King, the Duke of Suffolk, and the Earl of Northumberland. (Repealed by Statute Law (Repeals) Act 1978 (c. 45))
Assurance of Lands to King and Duke of Suffolk Act 1535 (repealed)	27 Hen. 8. c. 39; 27 Hen. 8. c. 11 Pr.	14 April 1536
An Act concerning the Duke of Suffolk's Place in Southwark to the King and his Heirs, and also concerning the Assurance of Norwich Place unto the Duke of Suffolk and his Heirs. (Repealed by Statute Law (Repeals) Act 1978 (c. 45))
Agreement, Duke of Suffolk and Sir Christopher Willoughby Act 1535 (repealed)	27 Hen. 8. c. 40; 27 Hen. 8. c. 12 Pr.	14 April 1536
An Act for Confirmation of an Agreement made between Charles Duke of Suffolk and Sir Christopher Willoughby. (Repealed by Statute Law (Repeals) Act 1978 (c. 45))
Assurance of Lands to Queen Anne for her life Act 1535 (repealed)	27 Hen. 8. c. 41; 27 Hen. 8. c. 13 Pr.	14 April 1536
An Act concerning the Assurance of certain Lands to Queen Anne for Term of her Life. (Repealed by Statute Law Revision Act 1953 (2 & 3 Eliz. 2. c. 5))
Universities and Colleges Exempt from First Fruits and Tenths Act 1535 (repealed)	27 Hen. 8. c. 42; 27 Hen. 8. c. 14 Pr.	14 April 1536
An Act concerning the Exoneration of Oxford and Cambridge from Payment of First Fruits and Tenths. (Repealed by Statute Law Revision Act 1948 (11 & 12 Geo. 6. c. 62))
Award Sir Piers Dutton and Sir William Molineux Act 1535 (repealed)	27 Hen. 8. c. 43; 27 Hen. 8. c. 15 Pr.	14 April 1536
An Act for Confirmation of an Award made by the King between Sir Pein Dutton on the one Part, and Sir William Molineux, Sir Thomas Southworth, and others. (Repealed by Statute Law (Repeals) Act 1978 (c. 45))
Partition of Lands between the heirs of Lord Broke Act 1535 (repealed)	27 Hen. 8. c. 44; 27 Hen. 8. c. 16 Pr.	14 April 1536
An Act for Confirmation of an Agreement made between Charles Blount, Lord Mountjoye, John Powlett, and their Wives, Daughters and Heirs of Robert Willoughby, Knight, Lord Brook, on the one Part, and Frances Dautrey and others on the other Part. (Repealed by Statute Law (Repeals) Act 1978 (c. 45))
Assurance to King of temporalities of See of Norwich Act 1535 (repealed)	27 Hen. 8. c. 45; 27 Hen. 8. c. 17 Pr.	14 April 1536
An Act concerning the Assurance of all the Temporalties belonging to the Bishoprick of Norwich, to the King and his Heirs, and for conveying other Lands to the Bishop and his Successors. (Repealed by Statute Law (Repeals) Act 1978 (c. 45))
Partition of Lands Lord Thomas Howard and Sir Thomas Poynings Act 1535 (repealed)	27 Hen. 8. c. 46; 27 Hen. 8. c. 18 Pr.	14 April 1536
An Act for Confirmation of a Partition of certain Lands made between the Lord Thomas Howard and Sir Thomas Poynings. (Repealed by Statute Law (Repeals) Act 1978 (c. 45))
Assurance to King of land of Earl of Northumberland Act 1535 (repealed)	27 Hen. 8. c. 47; 27 Hen. 8. c. 19 Pr.	14 April 1536
An Act that all the Lands and Possessions of the Earl of Northumberland, for want of Heirs of the Body of the said Earl begotten, shall come to the King and his Heirs. (Repealed by Statute Law (Repeals) Act 1978 (c. 45))
Assurance of Lands to Lord Chancellor Awdeley Act 1535 (repealed)	27 Hen. 8. c. 48; 27 Hen. 8. c. 20 Pr.	14 April 1536
An Act concerning an Assurance of certain Lands to Sir Thomas Awdeley, Knight, Lord Chancellor of England, and his Heirs. (Repealed by Statute Law (Repeals) Act 1978 (c. 45))
Assurance of Lands in Cheape to City of London Act 1535 (repealed)	27 Hen. 8. c. 49; 27 Hen. 8. c. 21 Pr.	14 April 1536
An Act concerning the Assurance of a void Plot of Ground being in Cheape in London, to the Mayor and Commonalty of the City of London and their Successors. (Repealed by Statute Law (Repeals) Act 1978 (c. 45))
Assurance of Manor of Halynge to King Act 1535 (repealed)	27 Hen. 8. c. 50; 27 Hen. 8. c. 22 Pr.	14 April 1536
An Act for Assurance of the Manor of Halynge to the King and his Heirs. (Repealed by Statute Law (Repeals) Act 1978 (c. 45))
Assurance of Manor of Collyweston to Queen Act 1535 (repealed)	27 Hen. 8. c. 51; 27 Hen. 8. c. 23 Pr.	14 April 1536
An Act for the Assurance of the Lordship of Collyweston, and other Things, to Queen Anne, for Term of her Life. (Repealed by Statute Law (Repeals) Act 1978 (c. 45))
Exchange of Lands, King and Corpus Christi College, Oxford Act 1535 (repealed)	27 Hen. 8. c. 52; 27 Hen. 8. c. 24 Pr.	14 April 1536
An Act concerning an Exchange of Lands between the King and the President and Scholars of Corpus Christi College in Oxford. (Repealed by Statute Law (Repeals) Act 1978 (c. 45))
Exchange of Lands, King and Prior of Marton Abbey Act 1535 (repealed)	27 Hen. 8. c. 53; 27 Hen. 8. c. 25 Pr.	14 April 1536
An Act concerning an Exchange between the King and the Prior and Covent of Marton Abbey. (Repealed by Statute Law (Repeals) Act 1978 (c. 45))
Assurance of Lands to Sir Arthur Darcy Act 1535 (repealed)	27 Hen. 8. c. 54; 27 Hen. 8. c. 26 Pr.	14 April 1536
An Act concerning the Assurance of certain Lands unto Sir Arthur Darcy, Knight, and his Heirs. (Repealed by Statute Law (Repeals) Act 1978 (c. 45))
Assurance of Lands to Anne Fitzwilliam Act 1535 (repealed)	27 Hen. 8. c. 55; 27 Hen. 8. c. 27 Pr.	14 April 1536
An Act concerning the Assurance of certain Lands unto Anne Fitzwilliam, in Recompence of her Jointure. (Repealed by Statute Law (Repeals) Act 1978 (c. 45))
Assurance of Land to Lord William Howard Act 1535 (repealed)	27 Hen. 8. c. 56; 27 Hen. 8. c. 28 Pr.	14 April 1536
An Act concerning the Assurance of certain Lands unto the Lord William Howard, for Term of his Life. (Repealed by Statute Law (Repeals) Act 1978 (c. 45))
Assurance of Lands to Thomas Pope Act 1535 (repealed)	27 Hen. 8. c. 57; 27 Hen. 8. c. 29 Pr.	14 April 1536
An Act concerning the Assurance of certain Lands unto Thomas Pope. (Repealed by Statute Law (Repeals) Act 1978 (c. 45))
Annulment of Feoffment by Sir Thomas More Act 1535 (repealed)	27 Hen. 8. c. 58; 27 Hen. 8. c. 30 Pr.	14 April 1536
An Act adnulling, as well a Deed of Feoffment, as also an Indenture, fraudulently made by Sir Thomas More, of Lands in Chelseth or elsewhere in the County of Middlesex. (Repealed by Statute Law (Repeals) Act 1978 (c. 45))
Attainder of John Lewes Act 1535 (repealed)	27 Hen. 8. c. 59; 27 Hen. 8. c. 31 Pr.	14 April 1536
An Acte concerning the attaynder of John Lewes. (Repealed by Statute Law (Repeals) Act 1977 (c. 18))
Tenths Act 1535 (repealed)	27 Hen. 8. c. 60 (Note: This act was not included in The Statutes at Large.)	14 April 1536
An Acte lymytyng of a lenger day to be gyven to the Collectours of the Tenthe for bringyng in their Certificat into the Kyng's Escheker. (Repealed by Statute Law Revision Act 1863 (26 & 27 Vict. c. 125))
Assurance of Manor of Bromhill to King Act 1535 (repealed)	27 Hen. 8. c. 61; 27 Hen. 8. c. 32 Pr.	14 April 1536
An Act concerning the Assurance of the Manor of Bromhill to the King and his Heirs. (Repealed by Statute Law (Repeals) Act 1978 (c. 45))
Surveyors of Crown Lands Act 1535 (repealed)	27 Hen. 8. c. 62; 27 Hen. 8. c. 33 Pr.	14 April 1536
An Act concerning the King's General Surveyors. (Repealed by Crown Debts Act 1541 (33 Hen. 8. c. 39))
Ordinances for Calais Act 1535 or the Calais Act 1535 (repealed)	27 Hen. 8. c. 63; 27 Hen. 8. c. 34 Pr.	14 April 1536
An Act declaring certain Ordinances to be observed in the Town of Callis and Marches of the same, together with the several Oaths that every Officer is to take. (Repealed by Statute Law Revision Act 1863 (26 & 27 Vict. c. 125))

=== Sources ===
- "27° Hen. VIII". The Statutes of the Realm. Vol. 3: 1509 to 1547. pp. 531–650 – via HathiTrust.
- "Anno vicesimo septimo Henrici VIII". The Statutes at Large. Vol. 4 – 1 Richard III to 31 Henry VIII – 1483-4 to 1539. pp. 348–410 – via Internet Archive.
- "Anno vicesimo septimo Henrici VIII". The Statutes at Large. Vol. 4 – 1 Richard III to 31 Henry VIII – 1483-4 to 1539. pp. 348–410 – via Internet Archive.
- "Anno vicesimo septimo Henrici VIII". The Statutes at Large. Vol. 4 – 1 Richard III to 31 Henry VIII – 1483-4 to 1539. pp. 348–410 – via Internet Archive.
- Journal of the House of Lords. Vol. 1: 1509-1577. London: His Majesty's Stationery Office. 1830 – via British History Online.
- Chronological Table of and Index to the Statutes. Vol. 1: To the End of the Session 59 Vict. Sess. 2 (1895) (13th ed.). London: Her Majesty's Stationery Office. 1896. pp. 48–49 – via Google Books.
- Chronological Table of the Statutes: Covering the Period from 1235 to the End of 1971. London: Her Majesty's Stationery Office. 1972. pp. 45–46. ISBN 978-0-11-840096-1 – via Google Books.
- "Acts of the English Parliament from 1535". legislation.gov.uk. The National Archives.

== See also ==
- List of acts of the Parliament of England
