= Rebellion Act 1572 =

Act of the Parliament of England

- Act of Parliament
- Parliament of England
- Long title: An Act for the punishment of such as shall rebelliously take or detain or conspire to take or detain from the Queen's Majesty any of her castles, towers, fortresses, holds, &c.
- Citation: 14 Eliz. 1. c. 1
- Territorial extent: England and Wales

Dates
- Royal assent: 30 June 1572
- Commencement: 8 May 1572 (Note: Start of session.)
- Expired: 24 March 1603 (Note: Section 3. The death of queen.)
- Repealed: 28 July 1863

Other legislation
- Repealed by: Statute Law Revision Act 1863
- Relates to: Escape of Traitors Act 1572; Coin Act 1575

Status: Repealed

Text of statute as originally enacted

The Rebellion Act 1572 (14 Eliz. 1. c. 1) was an act of the Parliament of England enacted during the reign of Elizabeth I that provided that if any person was convicted of conspiring to seize or destroy any castle or fortification held or garrisoned by the Queen's forces, then they and any associates were to be judged felons and suffer the death penalty without benefit of clergy or sanctuary. If any person was to prevent the use of any royal castle or ordnance by the crown, destroy any of the Queen's ships, or prevent the use of a harbour within the realm, then they were to be considered guilty of high treason and sentenced accordingly.

Section 3 of the act provided that the act would remain in force until the death of Queen Elizabeth I.

== Subsequent developments ==
Elizabeth I died on 24 March 1603, and the act was not continued.

Having expired, the whole act was repealed by section 1 of, and the schedule to, the Statute Law Revision Act 1863 (26 & 27 Vict. c. 125), which came into force on 28 July 1863.

== See also ==
- Treasons Act 1534
- Treason Act 1551
