= Treason Act 1842 =

Act of the Parliament of the United Kingdom

Treason Act 1842 (Note: The citation of this act by this short title was authorised by section 1 of, and the first schedule to, the Short Titles Act 1896. Due to the repeal of those provisions it is now authorised by section 19(2) of the Interpretation Act 1978.)
- Act of Parliament
- Parliament of the United Kingdom
- Long title: An Act for providing for the further Security and Protection of Her Majesty's Person.
- Citation: 5 & 6 Vict. c. 51
- Territorial extent: United Kingdom

Dates
- Royal assent: 16 July 1842
- Commencement: 16 July 1842 (Note: Section 1.)
Other legislation
Amended by	Statute Law Revision Act 1875; Treason Act 1945; Criminal Justice Act 1948; Treatment of Offenders Act (Northern Ireland) 1968
Relates to	Treason Act 1800

Status: Amended

Text of statute as originally enacted

Text of the Treason Act 1842 as in force today (including any amendments) within the United Kingdom, from legislation.gov.uk.

The Treason Act 1842 (5 & 6 Vict. c. 51) is an act of the Parliament of the United Kingdom. The act was passed early in the reign of Queen Victoria. As of 2025 the last person to be convicted under the act was Jaswant Singh Chail, on 3 February 2023, who was sentenced to 44 months in prison plus sentences for other offences, nine years in total, on 5 October 2023. He was the first person in more than 40 years to be convicted under the act.

== Background ==
On 29 May 1842, Victoria was riding in a carriage along The Mall, London, when John Francis, described by Victoria's husband Prince Albert as a "little, swarthy, ill-looking rascal ... of the age of twenty-six to thirty, with a shabby hat and of dirty appearance", aimed a pistol at her but did not fire. The following day, Victoria drove the same route, though faster and with a greater escort, in a deliberate attempt to provoke Francis to take a second aim and catch him in the act. As expected, Francis shot at her, but he was seized by plain clothes policemen, tried, and convicted of high treason. Francis's death sentence was commuted to transportation for life on 1 July. Two days later, in a similar attack, John William Bean fired a pistol at the Queen, but it was loaded only with paper and tobacco.

Edward Oxford, who had shot at Victoria in 1840, felt that the attempts were encouraged by his acquittal on the grounds of insanity two years before. Bean's assault, though physically harmless, was still punishable by death. Feeling that such a penalty was too harsh, Albert encouraged Parliament to pass a law recognising lesser crimes against the monarch, such as intent to alarm. Bean was sentenced to 18 months in gaol.

== Section 1 ==
In 19th century Britain, treason had its own special rules of evidence and procedure, which made it difficult to prosecute traitors successfully, such as the requirement that the prosecution produce two witnesses to the same overt act, or that three judges preside at the trial (see Treason Act 1695 for details). The Treason Act 1800 relaxed these rules in relation to attempts on the king's life, bringing the rules in such cases in line with the less restrictive rules which then existed in ordinary murder cases. Section 1 of the 1842 act went further, removing the special rules in all cases of treason involving any attempt to wound or maim the monarch.

This section was repealed on 15 June 1945 by the Treason Act 1945. This repeal was consequential on the extension of the ordinary rules of evidence and procedure to all forms of treason by section 1 of that Act.

== Section 2 ==
This section is still in force. It created a new offence (less serious than treason, "a high misdemeanour") of assaulting the monarch, or of having a firearm or offensive weapon in his presence with intent to injure or alarm him or to cause a breach of the peace. The maximum sentence is seven years.

In 1981, Marcus Sarjeant was sentenced to five years on pleading guilty to firing blank shots at Queen Elizabeth II when she was on parade. The previous use of this Section was in 1966, when John Francis Morgan was convicted for throwing a concrete block out of a building onto the Queen's car during a royal visit to Belfast.

On 2 August 2022, Jaswant Singh Chail was charged with offences under section 2 of the Treason Act 1842. He had been arrested in the grounds of Windsor Castle with a loaded crossbow on 25 December 2021; he was charged with "discharging or aiming firearms, or throwing or using any offensive matter or weapon, with intent to injure or alarm Her Majesty". He pleaded guilty to that and other offences on 3 February 2023 at the Old Bailey. On 5 October he was sentenced to consecutive prison terms totalling nine years, plus five years on extended licence; of the nine years' imprisonment, 44 months related to the charge under this section, the remainder being for having an offensive weapon contrary to section 1 of the Prevention of Crime Act 1953 and making threats to kill, contrary to section 16 of the Offences Against the Person Act 1861.

=== Sentence ===
Today, a person convicted of an offence under this section is liable to imprisonment for a term not exceeding seven years. Originally, an attempt to assault or alarm the monarch was made punishable by flogging and up to seven years' imprisonment. No-one who violated the act was ever flogged.

=== Relevant cases ===
- R v Francis (1842) 4 State Tr N.S. 1376
- R v Bean (1842) 4 State Tr N.S. 1382
- R v Hamilton (1849) 7 State Tr N.S. 1130
- Pate's Case (1850) 8 State Tr N.S. 1

== Section 3 ==
This section is also still in force, and provides that section 2 does not affect the penalty for treason. However, although under the Treason Act 1795 many kinds of assault on the monarch were treason, that act was repealed by the Crime and Disorder Act 1998. Under the present law – the Treason Act 1351 – in Great Britain the only act against the monarch's person that constitutes treason is to "compass or imagine" (Law French: compasser ou ymaginer) the monarch's death. Consequently, assaulting the monarch is only treason if it proves that state of mind.

In Northern Ireland intending or causing "any bodily harm" to the King remains treason under the Treason Act (Ireland) 1537 (28 Hen. 8. c. 7 (I)). The 1351 act also extends to Northern Ireland.

== See also ==
- High treason in the United Kingdom
- Treason Act
