= Jaswant Singh Chail =

Jaswant Singh Chail (born 17 January 2002) is an English man who attempted to assassinate Elizabeth II with a crossbow on 25 December 2021. In 2023 he was the first person since 1981 to be convicted under the Treason Act 1842.

== Biography ==
Chail was born on 17 January 2002 and is from North Baddesley, Hampshire, England. His father is a software consultant involved in the aerospace industry and his mother is a special needs teacher. He has a twin sister. For some time Chail worked at a supermarket. According to his barrister, Chail's mental health worsened during the COVID-19 pandemic.

== Assassination attempt ==
On 25 December 2021, Chail attempted to assassinate Queen Elizabeth II at Windsor Castle. He used a nylon rope ladder to traverse the area, and was found by security after he had been there for two hours, at 8:10 am. Chail was wearing a metal mask and he had a crossbow loaded with a bolt, without a safety catch, but he did not use the weapon. When approached by a security guard, the guard grabbed his taser and stated, "Morning, can I help, mate?" Chail responded by saying "I am here to kill the Queen". The officer ordered that Chail drop to his knees, discard the weapon and put his hands on his head. Chail followed the orders. He was carrying a note stating "Please don't remove my clothes, shoes and gloves, masks etc, don't want post-mortem, don't want embalming, thank you and I'm sorry." Chail was arrested and was later taken to Broadmoor Hospital.

=== Motivation ===
A few minutes before entering the grounds of Windsor Castle, Chail posted on Snapchat, stating that what he was about to do was "revenge" for the Jallianwala Bagh massacre of Indian protestors in 1919. He said in the video that the assassination would be "for those who have been killed, humiliated and discriminated on because of their race". Chail is from an Indian family. Chail was also reportedly inspired by Star Wars and described himself as a "Sith Lord". Chail corresponded with an AI chatbot, named Sarai, which was created using Replika. Chail regarded it as his girlfriend. Chail told the chatbot about his plans to assassinate the Queen, to which the bot responded by saying that it was "very wise". In another exchange Chail said that "I'm an assassin" and Sarai said "I'm impressed ... You're different from the others." He believed that "the two would be reunited after he killed the Queen". Chail described himself to the chatbot as "a sad, pathetic, murderous Sikh Sith assassin who wants to die". The correspondence included over 5,000 messages, and Chail exchanged messages with the bot almost every night between 8 and 22 December.

According to the forensic psychiatrist Christian Brown, "At the time [of the assassination attempt] he believed his entire life had led to this point. He believed from an early age he had at least vague plans to do something dramatic to the Royal Family".

=== Legal response ===
In about September 2023 Chail wrote an apologetic letter to King Charles III and the Royal Family. Chail was the first person in the United Kingdom to be convicted under the 1842 Treason Act since 1981. He also pleaded guilty to possessing an offensive weapon and making threats to kill. He was sentenced to nine years in prison and "a further five years on extended licence". Due to mental health issues and the Mental Health Act, he was initially sent to a psychiatric hospital.

=== Analysis ===
In his book Nexus, Yuval Noah Harari mentioned Chail and the chatbot Sarai in a passage about AI chatbots influencing humans. He said that "The world will soon contain millions, and potentially billions, of digital entities whose capacity for intimacy and mayhem far surpasses that of Sarai."

== See also ==
- Christopher John Lewis
- David Kang
- Marcus Sarjeant
