= Escape of Traitors Act 1572 =

Act of the Parliament of England

- Act of Parliament
- Parliament of England
- Long title: An Act against such as shall conspire or practice the Enlargement of any Prisoner committed for High Treason.
- Citation: 14 Eliz. 1. c. 2
- Territorial extent: England and Wales

Dates
- Royal assent: 30 June 1572
- Commencement: 30 June 1572 (Note: Section 1. End of session.)
- Repealed: 28 July 1863

Other legislation
- Repealed by: Statute Law Revision Act 1863
- Relates to: Treason Act 1423; Rebellion Act 1572; Coin Act 1575

Status: Repealed

Text of statute as originally enacted

The Escape of Traitors Act 1572 (14 Eliz. 1. c. 2), full title An Act against such as shall conspire or practice the enlargement of any prisoner committed for high treason, was an act of the Parliament of England enacted during the reign of Elizabeth I.

The act was passed alongside the Rebellion Act 1572, (14 Eliz. 1. c. 1) and together they formed part of the response to the 1571 Ridolfi Plot to overthrow the Queen. The two acts expanded the definition of treason and high treason, bringing a number of new offences into being as capital crimes. Along with the earlier Treasons Act 1571 (13 Eliz. 1. c. 1), and the later Coin Act 1575 (18 Eliz. 1. c. 1), they were part of a broader move to define treason as more than simply an attack on the person of the monarch.

== Provisions ==
The act provided that it was henceforth a crime to "conspire ... to set at liberty" any person imprisoned on the Queen's orders for treason (or suspicion of treason) against the Queen's person. If the conspiracy to release the prisoner was made before the prisoner had been indicted, the conspirator was guilty of misprision of treason; if the prisoner was between indictment and conviction, the conspirator was guilty of felony; and if the prisoner had already been convicted, the conspirator was guilty of high treason. The act came into force from the end of that session of Parliament (July 1572) and remained in force until the death of Elizabeth, when it expired.

Penalties for breach of the act would be imprisonment (misprision of treason); execution by hanging (treason); or being hanged, drawn and quartered if male or burned at the stake if female (high treason).

== Subsequent developments ==
The whole act was repealed by section 1 of, and the schedule to, the Statute Law Revision Act 1863 (26 & 27 Vict. c. 125), which came into force on 28 July 1863.

== See also ==
- Treason Act 1423

== Bibliography ==
- Prothero, G. W. (1913). Select statutes and other constitutional documents illustrative of the reigns of Elizabeth and James I (Fourth ed.). Oxford University Press. pp xlviii & 66–67.
- Chronological table of the statutes; HMSO, London. 1993.
- Willis Bund, J. W. (John William) (1879–1882). A selection of cases from the state trials. Cambridge, Univ. Press. p 177.
- Smith, Edward O. (1976). "Crown and Commonwealth: A Study in the Official Elizabethan Doctrine of the Prince". Transactions of the American Philosophical Society. 66 (8): 1–51. doi:10.2307/1006180. ISSN 0065-9746. JSTOR 1006180.
- John Bellamy. The Tudor Law of Treason: An Introduction. (Studies in Social History). Routledge and Kegan Paul. 1979. pp 67 & 68.
