= Treason Act 1814 =

Act of the Parliament of the United Kingdom

Treason Act 1814 (Note: The citation of this act by this short title was authorised by section 1 of, and the first schedule to, the Short Titles Act 1896. Due to the repeal of those provisions it is now authorised by section 19(2) of the Interpretation Act 1978.)
- Act of Parliament
- Parliament of the United Kingdom
- Long title: An Act to alter the Punishment in certain Cases of High Treason.
- Citation: 54 Geo. 3. c. 146
- Introduced by: Sir Samuel Romilly (Commons)
- Territorial extent: United Kingdom

Dates
- Royal assent: 27 July 1814
- Commencement: 27 July 1814 (Note: The Acts of Parliament (Commencement) Act 1793.)
Other legislation
| Amended by | Forfeiture Act 1870; Criminal Justice (Scotland) Act 1949; Statute Law (Repeals) Act 1973; Crime and Disorder Act 1998 |

Status: Amended

Text of statute as originally enacted

Revised text of statute as amended

Text of the Treason Act 1814 as in force today (including any amendments) within the United Kingdom, from legislation.gov.uk.

The Treason Act 1814 (54 Geo. 3. c. 146) is an act of the Parliament of the United Kingdom which modified the penalty for high treason for male convicts.

The last execution under the act was of William Joyce in 1946, for assisting the Third Reich during the Second World War.

== Subsequent developments ==
The original penalty for women was to be drawn to the place of execution and burned at the stake. Burning was abolished by the Treason Act 1790 (30 Geo. 3. c. 48) in Great Britain and by the Treason by Women Act (Ireland) 1796 (36 Geo. 3. c. 31 (I) ) in Ireland.

Note that hanging, drawing and quartering was never the penalty for counterfeiting or clipping coins (which was high treason until 1832). The penalty for this kind of high treason was the same as for petty treason, which for men was to be drawn to the place of execution and hanged, and for women was burning without being drawn. The death penalty for forging seals and the Royal sign-manual, which was the same as for other forms of high treason, was abolished in 1832, although it was still treason.

Originally the mandatory sentence for a man convicted of high treason (other than counterfeiting or coin clipping) was hanging, drawing and quartering. The act changed this punishment and replaced it with death by hanging, followed by posthumous quartering. The act was amended for England and Wales by the Forfeiture Act 1870 (33 & 34 Vict. c. 23) and for Scotland by the Criminal Justice (Scotland) Act 1949 (12, 13 & 14 Geo. 6. c. 94) so that the penalty became simply hanging, which was the method of execution for murder.

The act also permitted the King to authorise the use of an alternative method, beheading, which was not abolished until 1973 (although obsolete long before then) when section 2 of the act was repealed by section 1(1) of, and part V of schedule 1 to, the Statute Law (Repeals) Act 1973, which came into force on 18 July 1973.

The act was amended by the Crime and Disorder Act 1998 when the death penalty was abolished and replaced with imprisonment at the discretion of the court, up to life imprisonment.

== See also ==
- Capital punishment in the United Kingdom
- High treason in the United Kingdom
- Treason Act

== Bibliography ==
- (House of Commons), 23 March 1814, vol. 27, col. 342 - 346, at 346 (leave to bring forward bill)
- (House of Commons), 25 March 1814, vol. 27, col. 360 (first reading)
- Hansard (House of Commons), 25 April 1814, vol. 27, col. 538 - 541
