= Forfeiture Act 1870 =

Act of the Parliament of the United Kingdom

Forfeiture Act 1870 (Note: The citation of this act by this short title was authorised by the Short Titles Act 1896, section 1 and the first schedule. Due to the repeal of those provisions it is now authorised by section 19(2) of the Interpretation Act 1978.)
- Act of Parliament
- Parliament of the United Kingdom
- Long title: An Act to abolish Forfeitures for Treason and Felony, and to otherwise amend the Law relating thereto.
- Citation: 33 & 34 Vict. c. 23
- Territorial extent: England and Wales; Ireland; (Note: Section 33.)

Dates
- Royal assent: 4 July 1870
- Commencement: 4 July 1870 (Note: Section 1.)
Other legislation
| Amends | Treason Act 1790; Treason Act 1814 |
| Amended by | Costs in Criminal Cases Act 1908; Local Government Act 1933; Administration of Justice (Miscellaneous Provisions) Act 1938; Criminal Justice Act 1948; Ecclesiastical Jurisdiction Measure 1963; Criminal Law Act 1967; Criminal Justice Act 1972; Statute Law (Repeals) Act 1993 |

Status: Partially repealed

Text of statute as originally enacted

Revised text of statute as amended

Text of the Forfeiture Act 1870 as in force today (including any amendments) within the United Kingdom, from legislation.gov.uk.

The Forfeiture Act 1870 (33 & 34 Vict. c. 23) or the Abolition of Forfeiture Act 1870 or the Felony Act 1870 is an act of the Parliament of the United Kingdom that abolished the automatic forfeiture of goods and land as a punishment for treason and felony. It does not apply to Scotland, which did not fully abolish forfeiture until the Criminal Justice (Scotland) Act 1949 (12, 13 & 14 Geo. 6. c. 94 ). Prior to the act being passed, a person convicted of treason or felony automatically and permanently forfeited all of his lands and possessions to the Crown. The old offence of praemunire, which was also punished with forfeiture, was only a misdemeanour, and so the act did not apply to it.

Although the act is mostly repealed today, section 2 remains in force and states that anyone convicted of treason shall be disqualified from holding public office, shall lose his right to vote in elections (except in elections to local authorities), and lose his pension (his pension can however be restored, in whole or in part, under section 70 of the Criminal Justice Act 1948 (11 & 12 Geo. 6. c. 58) ).

Section 31 of the act also abolished the final incarnation of the punishment of being hanged, drawn and quartered, which had been law in various forms for several centuries.

== Subsequent developments ==
Section 4 of the act was repealed by section 64(2) of, and part II of schedule 6 to, the Criminal Justice Act 1972, which came into force on 1 January 1973.

Section 2 of the act, in so far as it relates to ecclesiastical benefices and the holders thereof, was repealed by section 87 of, and the fifth schedule to, the Ecclesiastical Jurisdiction Measure 1963 (No. 1), which came into force on 1 March 1965.

Section 1, the words “Provided nevertheless, that” in section 2, and section 5 of the act were repealed by section 1(1) of, and group 1 of part I of schedule 1 to, the Statute Law (Repeals) Act 1993, which came into force on 5 November 1993.

== See also ==
- Treason Act 1814
- High treason in the United Kingdom
- Corruption of Blood Act 1814
