= Treason Act 1495 =

Act of the Parliament of England

Treason Act 1495 (Note: The act has no statutory short title.)
- Act of Parliament
- Parliament of England
- Long title: An Acte that noe person going wth the Kinge to the Warres shalbe attaynt of treason.
- Citation: 11 Hen. 7. c. 1
- Territorial extent: England and Wales

Dates
- Royal assent: 22 December 1495
- Commencement: 14 October 1495 (Note: Start of session.)

Status: Current legislation

Text of statute as originally enacted

Revised text of statute as amended

Text of the Act 11 Hen. 7 1495 as in force today (including any amendments) within the United Kingdom, from legislation.gov.uk.

The Treason Act 1495 (11 Hen. 7. c. 1), formally referred as the Act 11 Hen. 7. c. 1 and informally as the Rex de facto statute, is an act of the Parliament of England which was passed in the reign of Henry VII of England.

== Background ==
After the defeat of Richard III in the Battle of Bosworth on 22 August 1485, Henry VII was crowned King of England. However, Henry VII backdated the start of his reign to 21 August, the day before the battle, which enabled him to prosecute anyone who had fought under his rival and execute them for treason.

This was highly controversial, since it meant that anyone who fought for the rightful king against a usurper would be at risk of execution if they lost, and might undermine their courage and loyalty. Nevertheless, Henry VII had his way as the Parliament of England was in no position to oppose him, although later that year a general pardon was issued to those who had fought for Richard III.

However, in 1495, Henry VII's position on the throne was sufficiently secure that he could afford to allow Parliament to pass a bill to prevent the treason laws from being abused in this way.

== The act ==
The act states that a person serving the king de facto for the time being is not guilty of treason, or of any other offence, if he wages war against the king de jure. William Blackstone wrote that the act is "declaratory of the common law." (Note: A precedent had been set when Edward IV became king in 1461 and Parliament declared that his deposed predecessor, Henry VI, had never been the rightful king, but "to avoid great public mischief" also declared him a king de facto, and people continued to be punished for treason against Henry (except for assisting Edward in deposing him).)

== Subsequent developments ==
In 1662, the act was cited by Sir Harry Vane in his treason trial following the Restoration. He was one of those accused of serving with Oliver Cromwell against the king during the English Civil War, and in his defence he relied upon the act. However the court ruled that the act was only intended to protect those who fought for a king, not to protect rebels who fought to abolish the monarchy. He was convicted and executed.

The act is still in force today, and was applied to Scotland following the passage of the Treason Act 1708 (7 Ann. c. 21).

== Other countries ==
In New Zealand, the Crimes Act 1961 provides that obedience to the laws of a person with "possession de facto of the sovereign power" is protected from criminal responsibility.

== See also ==
- High treason in the United Kingdom
- Treason Act
