= Treason Act 1553 =

Act of the Parliament of England

Treason Act 1553 (Note: The citation of this act by this short title was authorised by section 5 of, and the second schedule to, the Statute Law Revision Act 1948. Due to the repeal of those provisions, it is now authorised by section 19(2) of the Interpretation Act 1978.)
- Act of Parliament
- Parliament of England
- Long title: An Acte repealing certayne Treasons Felonies and Premunire. (Note: These words are printed against this act in the second column of the second schedule to the Statute Law Revision Act 1948, which is headed "Title".)
- Citation: 1 Mar. Sess. 1. c. 1
- Territorial extent: England and Wales

Dates
- Royal assent: 21 October 1553
- Commencement: 5 October 1553 (Note: Section 1.)
- Repealed: 1 January 1968

Other legislation
- Amends: Treason Act 1399; Treason Act 1429; Treason Act 1535; Riot Act 1549
- Amended by: Statute Law Revision Act 1863; Statute Law Revision Act 1888
- Repealed by: Criminal Law Act 1967
- Relates to: Treason Act 1351; Riot Act 1553

Status: Repealed

Text of statute as originally enacted

The Treason Act 1553 (1 Mar. Sess. 1. c. 1) was an act of the Parliament of England. It should not be confused with another act about treason passed in the same year, Mary's second general Treason Act (1 Mar. Sess. 2. c. 6).

Section 1 of the act abolished all forms of treason that had been created since 1351, except the Treason Act 1351 (25 Edw. 3 Stat. 5. c. 2) itself. It also abolished all felonies created since the beginning of the reign of Henry VIII.

== Repeal ==
Section 2 of the act was repealed on 28 July 1863 by section 1 of, and the schedule to, the Statute Law Revision Act 1863 (26 & 27 Vict. c. 125).

The whole act was repealed by section 10(2) of, and part I of schedule 3 to, the Criminal Law Act 1967, which came into force on 1 January 1968.

== Other treason legislation ==
Treason (No. 2) Act 1553
- Act of Parliament
- Parliament of England
- Long title: An act against counterfeiting of strange coins, being current within this realm, or of the Queen's highness sign manual, signet, or privy seal, to be adjudged high treason.
- Citation: 1 Mar. Sess. 2. c. 6
- Territorial extent: England and Wales

Dates
- Royal assent: 5 December 1553
- Commencement: 24 October 1553 (Note: Start of session.)
- Repealed: 1 May 1832

Other legislation
- Amended by: Forgery Act 1830
- Repealed by: Coinage Offences Act 1832
- Relates to: Treason Act 1553; Coinage Offences Act 1861; Criminal Law Act 1967; Forgery and Counterfeiting Act 1981

Status: Repealed

Text of statute as originally enacted

The Treason (No. 2) Act 1553 (1 Mar. Sess. 2. c. 6), passed in the same year, made it high treason to counterfeit foreign coins, or forge the Queen's privy seal, signet ring or royal sign-manual. That act was repealed and replaced by section 31 of the Forgery Act 1830 (11 Geo. 4 & 1 Will. 4. c. 66), (Note: The 1830 act did not apply in Scotland: section 29.) which continued this form of treason until it was repealed in 1861 by the Coinage Offences Act 1861 (24 & 25 Vict. c. 99). That offence continued to exist as a felony after the Criminal Law Act 1967, until the Forgery and Counterfeiting Act 1981.

== See also ==
- High treason in the United Kingdom
- Treason Act
