= List of acts of the Parliament of England from 1553 =

This is a list of acts of the Parliament of England for the year 1553.

For acts passed during the period 1707–1800, see the list of acts of the Parliament of Great Britain. See also the list of acts of the Parliament of Scotland, and the list of acts of the Parliament of Ireland.

For acts passed from 1801 onwards, see the list of acts of the Parliament of the United Kingdom. For acts of the devolved parliaments and assemblies in the United Kingdom, see the list of acts of the Scottish Parliament, the list of acts of the Northern Ireland Assembly, and the list of acts and measures of Senedd Cymru; see also the list of acts of the Parliament of Northern Ireland.

For medieval statutes, etc. that are not considered to be acts of Parliament, see the list of English statutes.

See also the List of ordinances and acts of the Parliament of England, 1642–1660 for ordinances and acts passed by the Long Parliament and other bodies without royal assent, and which were not considered to be valid legislation following the Restoration in 1660.

The number shown after each act's title is its chapter number. Acts are cited using this number, preceded by the years of the reign during which the relevant parliamentary session was held; thus the Union with Ireland Act 1800 is cited as "39 & 40 Geo. 3. c. 67", meaning the 67th act passed during the session that started in the 39th year of the reign of George III and which finished in the 40th year of that reign. The modern convention is to use Arabic numerals in citations (thus "41 Geo. 3" rather than "41 Geo. III"). Acts of the last session of the Parliament of Great Britain and the first session of the Parliament of the United Kingdom are both cited as "41 Geo. 3".

Acts passed by the Parliament of England did not have a short title; however, some of these acts have subsequently been given a short title by acts of the Parliament of the United Kingdom, such as the Short Titles Act 1896 (59 & 60 Vict. c. 14).

Acts passed by the Parliament of England were deemed to have come into effect on the first day of the session in which they were passed. Because of this, the years given in the list below may in fact be the year before a particular act was passed.

== 7 Edw. 6 ==
The 2nd Parliament of King Edward VI, which met from 1 March 1553 until 31 March 1553.

This session was also traditionally cited as 7 Ed. 6.

=== Public acts ===
Short title	Citation	Royal assent
Long title
Crown Revenues Act 1553 (repealed)	7 Edw. 6. c. 1	31 March 1553
An Act for the true answering of the King's Majesty's Revenues. (Repealed by Statute Law Revision Act 1863 (26 & 27 Vict. c. 125))
Dissolution of Certain Courts Act 1553 (repealed)	7 Edw. 6. c. 2	31 March 1553
An Act for the dissolving, uniting, or annexing, of certain Courts, lately erected by the King that dead is. (Repealed by Statute Law Revision Act 1863 (26 & 27 Vict. c. 125))
Crown Lands Act 1553 (repealed)	7 Edw. 6. c. 3	31 March 1553
An Act for the Confirmation of the King's Majesty's Letters Patents of Bargains and Sale, notwithstanding the Lack or Loss of the Particulars or the Bill assigned of the Patentees. (Repealed by Statute Law Revision Act 1948 (11 & 12 Geo. 6. c. 62))
Payment of Tenths to King Act 1553 (repealed)	7 Edw. 6. c. 4	31 March 1553
An Act, That all Patentees of Collectorships of Tenths shall be bound for their Collection. (Repealed by First Fruits and Tenths Measure 1926 (16 & 17 Geo. 5. No. 5))
Wines Act 1553 (repealed)	7 Edw. 6. c. 5	31 March 1553
An Act to avoid the great Prices and Excess of Wines. (Repealed by Repeal of Obsolete Statutes Act 1856 (19 & 20 Vict. c. 64))
Exportation Act 1553 (repealed)	7 Edw. 6. c. 6	31 March 1553
An Act reviving a Statute made Anno 17° Edwardi Quarti, (Note: Currency, etc. Act 1477 (17 Edw. 4. c. 1)) touching the Carrying of Gold and Silver out of the Realm. (Repealed by Statute Law Revision Act 1863 (26 & 27 Vict. c. 125))
Assize of Fuel Act 1553 (repealed)	7 Edw. 6. c. 7	31 March 1553
An Act for the Assize of Fuel. (Repealed by Repeal of Obsolete Statutes Act 1856 (19 & 20 Vict. c. 64))
Fulling of Caps Act 1553 (repealed)	7 Edw. 6. c. 8	31 March 1553
An Act for the true Fulling and Thickning of Caps. (Repealed by Continuance, etc. of Laws Act 1603 (1 Jas. 1. c. 25))
Cloths Act 1553 (repealed)	7 Edw. 6. c. 9	31 March 1553
An Act for the true making of White Plain Straights and Pinned White Straights in Devon and Cornewall. (Repealed by Cloths (No. 2) Act 1584 (27 Eliz. 1. c. 18)
Gateside Act 1553 (repealed)	7 Edw. 6. c. 10	31 March 1553
An Act for the uniting and annexing of the Town of Gatesyde to the Town of Newcastell upon Tyne. (Repealed by See of Durham Act 1554 (1 Mar. Sess. 3. c. 3))
Continuance of Acts Act 1553 (repealed)	7 Edw. 6. c. 11	31 March 1553
An Act for the Continuance of certain Statutes. (Repealed by Statute Law Revision Act 1863 (26 & 27 Vict. c. 125))
Taxation Act 1553 (repealed)	7 Edw. 6. c. 12	31 March 1553
An Act of a Subsidy and two Fifteenths and Tenths, granted to the King's Majesty by the Temporalty. (Repealed by Statute Law Revision Act 1863 (26 & 27 Vict. c. 125))
Taxation (No. 2) Act 1553 (repealed)	7 Edw. 6. c. 13	31 March 1553
An Act for Confirmation of a Subsidy granted by the Clergy. (Repealed by Statute Law Revision Act 1863 (26 & 27 Vict. c. 125))
Act of General Pardon 1553 (repealed)	7 Edw. 6. c. 14	31 March 1553
An Act of the King's Majesty's most Gracious General and Free Pardon. (Repealed by Statute Law Revision Act 1863 (26 & 27 Vict. c. 125))

=== Private acts ===
Short title	Citation	Royal assent
Long title
See of Durham Act 1553 (repealed)	7 Edw. 6. c. 1 Pr.	31 March 1553
An Act for the Dissolution of the Bishoprick of Durham, and for the new Erecting of the same Bishoprick. (Repealed by See of Durham Act 1554 (1 Mar. Sess. 3. c. 3))
Restitution in blood of Sir Edward Seymour.	7 Edw. 6. c. 2 Pr.	31 March 1553
An Act for the Restitution in Blood of Sir Edward Seymor, Knight.
Denization of children of Richard Hills and Nicholas Wheler.	7 Edw. 6. c. 3 Pr.	31 March 1553
An Act to make Denizens the Children of Richard Hill and Nicholas Whelar.

=== Sources ===
- "7° Edw. VI". The Statutes of the Realm. Vol. 4 Part 1: 1547 to 1584. pp. 160–196 – via Internet Archive.
- "7° Edw. VI". The Statutes of the Realm. Vol. 4 Part 1: 1547 to 1584. pp. 160–196 – via HathiTrust.
- "7° Edw. VI". The Statutes of the Realm. Vol. 4 Part 1: 1547 to 1584. pp. 160–196 – via Google Books.
- "Anno septimo Edw. VI". The Statutes at Large. Vol. 5 – 32 Henry VIII to 7 Edward VI – 1540 to 1552–3. pp. 395–410 – via Internet Archive. [incomplete, ends at c. 7]
- Journal of the House of Commons. Vol. 1 – 1547-1629. His Majesty's Stationery Office. 1802 – via British History Online.
- Journal of the House of Lords. Vol. 1: 1509-1577. London: His Majesty's Stationery Office. 1830 – via British History Online.
- Chronological Table of and Index to the Statutes. Vol. 1: To the End of the Session 59 Vict. Sess. 2 (1895) (13th ed.). London: Her Majesty's Stationery Office. 1896. pp. 56–57 – via Google Books.
- Chronological Table of the Statutes: Covering the Period from 1235 to the End of 1971. London: Her Majesty's Stationery Office. 1972. p. 54. ISBN 978-0-11-840096-1 – via Google Books.
- "Chronological Tables of the Private and Personal Acts: Part 1 (1539–1601)". legislation.gov.uk. The National Archives.

== 1 Mar. Sess. 1 ==
The first session of the 1st Parliament of Queen Mary I, which met from 5 October 1553 until 21 October 1553.

This session was also traditionally cited 1 Mar. Stat. 1, 1 Mar. stat. 1, 1 Mar. St. 1, 1 Mar. st. 1, 1 Mary, Stat. 1, 1 Mary, stat. 1, 1 Mary, Stat. 1, 1 Mary, St. 1, 1 Mary, st. 1, 1 M. Sess. 1, 1 M. Stat. 1, 1 M. stat. 1, 1 M. St. 1 or 1 M. st. 1.

=== Public acts ===
Short title	Citation	Royal assent
Long title
Treason Act 1553 (repealed)	1 Mar. Sess. 1. c. 1	21 October 1553
An Acte repealing certayne Treasons, Felonies, and Premunire. (Repealed by Criminal Law Act 1967 (c. 58))

=== Private acts ===
Short title	Citation	Royal assent
Long title
Restitution in blood of Lady Gartrude Courtney.	1 Mar. Sess. 1. c. 1 Pr.	21 October 1553
An act for the restitution in blood of the lady Gartred Courtney, late wife of Henry Courtney, late lord marquis of Exeter.
Restitution in blood of Sir Edward Courtney, Earl of Devon.	1 Mar. Sess. 1. c. 2 Pr.	21 October 1553
An act for the restitution in blood of Sir Edward Courtney, knight, earl of Devon.

=== Sources ===
- "1° Mariæ, St. 1". The Statutes of the Realm. Vol. 4 Part 1: 1547 to 1584. pp. 197–198 – via Internet Archive.
- "1° Mariæ, St. 1". The Statutes of the Realm. Vol. 4 Part 1: 1547 to 1584. pp. 197–198 – via HathiTrust.
- "1° Mariæ, St. 1". The Statutes of the Realm. Vol. 4 Part 1: 1547 to 1584. pp. 197–198 – via Google Books.
- Pickering, Danby, ed. (1763). "Anno primo Mariæ, sessio prima". The Statutes at Large. Vol. 6: from the First Year of Queen Mary to the Thirty-fifth Year of Queen Elizabeth, inclusive. Cambridge: Joseph Bentham. pp. 1–3 – via Internet Archive.
- Pickering, Danby, ed. (1763). "Anno primo Mariæ, sessio prima". The Statutes at Large. Vol. 6: from the First Year of Queen Mary to the Thirty-fifth Year of Queen Elizabeth, inclusive. Cambridge: Joseph Bentham. pp. 1–3 – via Internet Archive.
- Journal of the House of Commons. Vol. 1 – 1547-1629. His Majesty's Stationery Office. 1802 – via British History Online.
- Journal of the House of Lords. Vol. 1: 1509-1577. London: His Majesty's Stationery Office. 1830 – via British History Online.
- Chronological Table of and Index to the Statutes. Vol. 1: To the End of the Session 59 Vict. Sess. 2 (1895) (13th ed.). London: Her Majesty's Stationery Office. 1896. p. 57 – via Google Books.
- Chronological Table of the Statutes: Covering the Period from 1235 to the End of 1971. London: Her Majesty's Stationery Office. 1972. p. 54. ISBN 978-0-11-840096-1 – via Google Books.
- "Chronological Tables of the Private and Personal Acts: Part 1 (1539–1601)". legislation.gov.uk. The National Archives.

== 1 Mar. Sess. 2 ==
The second session of the 1st Parliament of Queen Mary I, which met from 24 October 1553 until 5 December 1553.

This session was also traditionally cited 1 Mar. Stat. 2, 1 Mar. stat. 2, 1 Mar. St. 2, 1 Mar. st. 2, 1 Mary, Stat. 2, 1 Mary, stat. 2, 1 Mary, Stat. 2, 1 Mary, St. 2, 1 Mary, st. 2, 1 M. Sess. 2, 1 M. Stat. 2, 1 M. stat. 2, 1 M. St. 2 or 1 M. st. 2.

=== Public acts ===
Short title	Citation	Royal assent
Long title
Legitimacy of the Queen, etc. Act 1553 (repealed)	1 Mar. Sess. 2. c. 1	5 December 1553
An Acte declaring the Quenes Hyghnes to have bene borne in a most just and lawfull Matrimonie, and also repealing all Actes of Pliament and Sentences of Divorce hadd and made to the contrarie. (Repealed by Statute Law Revision Act 1948 (11 & 12 Geo. 6. c. 62))
First Statute of Repeal (repealed)	1 Mar. Sess. 2. c. 2	5 December 1553
An Acte for the Repeale of certayne Statutes made in the time of the Reigne of Kinge Edwarde the Syxthe. (Repealed by Continuance, etc. of Laws Act 1603 (1 Jas. 1. c. 25))
Brawling Act 1553 (repealed)	1 Mar. Sess. 2. c. 3	5 December 1553
An Acte against Offenders of Preachers and other Ministers in the Churche. (Repealed by Criminal Law Act 1967 (c. 58))
Validity of Certain Writings, etc. Act 1553 (repealed)	1 Mar. Sess. 2. c. 4	5 December 1553
An Acte touching Writinges made from the syxthe daye of Julye last paste, and before the first daye of August then next ensuenge. (Repealed by Statute Law Revision Act 1863 (26 & 27 Vict. c. 125))
Limitation of Actions Act 1553 (repealed)	1 Mar. Sess. 2. c. 5	5 December 1553
An Acte for the Lymytatcyon of Prescription in certayne cases. (Repealed by Statute Law Revision Act 1863 (26 & 27 Vict. c. 125))
Treason (No. 2) Act 1553 (repealed)	1 Mar. Sess. 2. c. 6	5 December 1553
An Acte against counterfeiting of straunge Coigns, being current within this Realme, or of the Quene's Highnes Signe Manuall, Sygnet, or Privie Seale. (Repealed by Coinage Offences Act 1832 (2 & 3 Will. 4. c. 34))
Fines of Land Act 1553 (repealed)	1 Mar. Sess. 2. c. 7	5 December 1553
An Acte touching Proclamations upon Fines. (Repealed by Statute Law Revision Act 1863 (26 & 27 Vict. c. 125))
Sheriff Act 1553 (repealed)	1 Mar. Sess. 2. c. 8	5 December 1553
An Acte that Sheriffes shall not be Justices of Peace during that Office. (Repealed by Sheriffs Act 1887 (50 & 51 Vict. c. 55))
College of Physicians Act 1553 (repealed)	1 Mar. Sess. 2. c. 9	5 December 1553
An Acte touching thincorporations of the Phisitions in London. (Repealed by Food and Drugs Act 1938 (1 & 2 Geo. 6. c. 56) and Statute Law Revision Act 1948 (11 & 12 Geo. 6. c. 62))
Dissolution of Courts Act 1553 (repealed)	1 Mar. Sess. 2. c. 10	5 December 1553
An Acte for the uniting, dissolving, or newe erecting of Courtes. (Repealed by Statute Law Revision Act 1863 (26 & 27 Vict. c. 125))
Hats and Caps Act 1553 (repealed)	1 Mar. Sess. 2. c. 11	5 December 1553
An Acte for the Sale of Hattes and Cappes made beyonde the Sea. (Repealed by Continuance, etc. of Laws Act 1603 (1 Jas. 1. c. 25), confirmed by Repeal of Acts Concerning Importation Act 1822 (3 Geo. 4. c. 41))
Riot Act 1553 (repealed)	1 Mar. Sess. 2. c. 12	5 December 1553
An Acte against unlawfull and Rebellyous Assemblies. (Repealed by Statute Law Revision Act 1863 (26 & 27 Vict. c. 125))
Continuance of Laws Act 1553 (repealed)	1 Mar. Sess. 2. c. 13	5 December 1553
An Acte for the continuance of certayne Statutes. (Repealed by Statute Law Revision Act 1863 (26 & 27 Vict. c. 125))
Gaols Act 1553 (repealed)	1 Mar. Sess. 2. c. 14	5 December 1553
An Acte for the continuance of a Statute made for the reparation of Gaoles. (Repealed by Statute Law Revision Act 1863 (26 & 27 Vict. c. 125))
York (Rebuilding of Saint Helen's Stanegate) Act 1553 (repealed)	1 Mar. Sess. 2. c. 15	5 December 1553
An Acte for the rededifying of the Parishe Churche of Saunte Elene in Stanegate, within the Citie of Yoreke. (Repealed by Statute Law Revision Act 1948 (11 & 12 Geo. 6. c. 62))
Attainder of Duke of Northumberland and others Act 1553 (repealed)	1 Mar. Sess. 2. c. 16	5 December 1553
An Acte for the confirmation of thattaynder of John late Duke of Northumberlande and others. (Repealed by Statute Law (Repeals) Act 1977 (c. 18))
Taxation Act 1553 (repealed)	1 Mar. Sess. 2. c. 17	5 December 1553
An Acte for the Release of the last Subsidie of the Temporaltie. (Repealed by Statute Law Revision Act 1863 (26 & 27 Vict. c. 125))
Taxation (No. 2) Act 1553 (repealed)	1 Mar. Sess. 2. c. 18	5 December 1553
An Acte of a Subsidie of Tonnage and Ponddage of dyvers Marchaundises. (Repealed by Statute Law Revision Act 1863 (26 & 27 Vict. c. 125))

=== Private acts ===
Short title	Citation	Royal assent
Long title
Restitution in blood of Thomas Howard, Earl of Surrey.	1 Mar. Sess. 2. c. 1 Pr.	5 December 1553
An act for the restitution in blood of Sir Thomas Howard, knight, otherwise called Thomas Howard earl of Surry.
Restitution in blood of Sir Edward Seymour.	1 Mar. Sess. 2. c. 2 Pr.	5 December 1553
An act for the restitution in blood of Sir Edward Seymor, knight, eldest son of the late duke of Somerset, born of the lady Anne his last wife.
Incorporation of Merton College, Oxford.	1 Mar. Sess. 2. c. 3 Pr.	5 December 1553
An act for the incorporation of the warden and scholars of Merton college in Oxford.
Restitution in blood of the heirs of Lord Montague.	1 Mar. Sess. 2. c. 4 Pr.	5 December 1553
An act for the restitution in blood of the heirs of Henry Pool, late lord Montague.
Restitution in blood of Sir Marmaduke Constable.	1 Mar. Sess. 2. c. 5 Pr.	5 December 1553
An act for the restitution in blood of Sir Marmaduke Constable, knight.
Restitution in blood of Thomas Stanhope.	1 Mar. Sess. 2. c. 6 Pr.	5 December 1553
An act for the restitution in blood of Thomas Stanhope, esquire.
Restitution in blood of Mathew Arundel.	1 Mar. Sess. 2. c. 7 Pr.	5 December 1553
An act for the restitution in blood of Mathew Arundell, esquire.
Keeping the county days in Cardiganshire.	1 Mar. Sess. 2. c. 8 Pr.	5 December 1553
An act for keeping the county-days in Cardiganshire.
Restitution in blood of the heirs of Sir Miles Partriche.	1 Mar. Sess. 2. c. 9 Pr.	5 December 1553
An act for the restitution in blood of the heirs of Sir Miles Partridge, knight.
Denization of wives and children of Richard Batson, Thomas Browne, and John Bradleye.	1 Mar. Sess. 2. c. 10 Pr.	5 December 1553
An act to make free denizens the wives and children of Richard Batson, Thomas Brown, and John Bradley, born beyond the seas.
Repair of Sherbourne Causeway.	1 Mar. Sess. 2. c. 11 Pr.	5 December 1553
An act for the reparation of Sherborne cawsey.
Marquis of Northampton's Marriage Confirmation Repeal Act 1553	1 Mar. Sess. 2. c. 12 Pr.	5 December 1553
An act repealing a statute made in the fifth year of King Edward the Sixth, touching the approving the marriage between the marquis of Northampton and the lady Elizabeth his wife, and for the legitimation of their children.
Duke of Norfolk's Restitution Act 1553	1 Mar. Sess. 2. c. 13 Pr.	5 December 1553
An act declaring the attainder of the duke of Norfolk.

=== Sources ===
- "1° Mariæ, St. 2". The Statutes of the Realm. Vol. 4 Part 1: 1547 to 1584. pp. 199–220 – via Internet Archive.
- "1° Mariæ, St. 2". The Statutes of the Realm. Vol. 4 Part 1: 1547 to 1584. pp. 199–220 – via HathiTrust.
- "1° Mariæ, St. 2". The Statutes of the Realm. Vol. 4 Part 1: 1547 to 1584. pp. 199–220 – via Google Books.
- Pickering, Danby, ed. (1763). "Anno primo Mariæ, sessio secunda". The Statutes at Large. Vol. 6: from the First Year of Queen Mary to the Thirty-fifth Year of Queen Elizabeth, inclusive. Cambridge: Joseph Bentham. pp. 3–18 – via Internet Archive.
- Pickering, Danby, ed. (1763). "Anno primo Mariæ, sessio secunda". The Statutes at Large. Vol. 6: from the First Year of Queen Mary to the Thirty-fifth Year of Queen Elizabeth, inclusive. Cambridge: Joseph Bentham. pp. 3–18 – via Internet Archive.
- Journal of the House of Commons. Vol. 1 – 1547-1629. His Majesty's Stationery Office. 1802 – via British History Online.
- Journal of the House of Lords. Vol. 1: 1509-1577. London: His Majesty's Stationery Office. 1830 – via British History Online.
- Chronological Table of and Index to the Statutes. Vol. 1: To the End of the Session 59 Vict. Sess. 2 (1895) (13th ed.). London: Her Majesty's Stationery Office. 1896. p. 57 – via Google Books.
- Chronological Table of the Statutes: Covering the Period from 1235 to the End of 1971. London: Her Majesty's Stationery Office. 1972. p. 54. ISBN 978-0-11-840096-1 – via Google Books.
- "Chronological Tables of the Private and Personal Acts: Part 1 (1539–1601)". legislation.gov.uk. The National Archives.

== See also ==
- List of acts of the Parliament of England
