= High treason in the United Kingdom =

Offence under British law

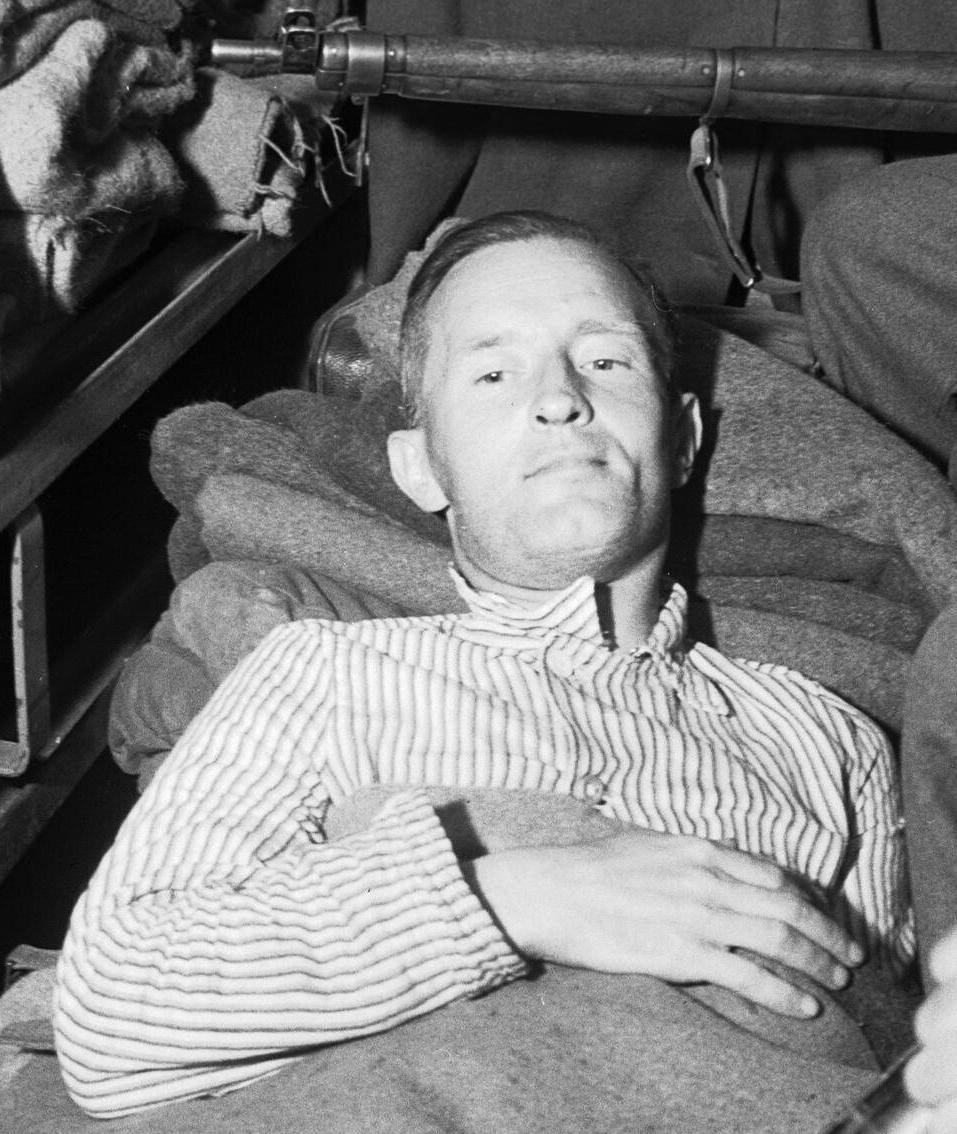
William Joyce ("Lord Haw-Haw") was the last person to be executed for treason in the UK, here seen under armed guard in 1945.

Under the law of the United Kingdom, high treason is the crime of disloyalty to the Crown. Offences constituting high treason include plotting the murder of the sovereign; committing adultery with the sovereign's consort, with the sovereign's eldest unmarried daughter, or with the wife of the heir to the throne; levying war against the sovereign and adhering to the sovereign's enemies, giving them aid or comfort; and attempting to undermine the line of succession to the Throne. Several other crimes have historically been categorised as high treason, including counterfeiting money and being a Catholic priest.

High treason was generally distinguished from petty treason, a treason committed against a subject of the sovereign, the scope of which was limited by statute to the murder of a legal superior. Petty treason comprised the murder of a master by his servant, of a husband by his wife, or of a bishop by a clergyman. Petty treason ceased to be a distinct offence from murder in 1828, and consequently high treason is today often referred to simply as treason.

Considered to be the most serious of offences (more than murder or other felonies), high treason was often met with extraordinary punishment, because it threatened the safety of the state. Hanging, drawing and quartering was the usual punishment until the 19th century. Subsequent to the Judgement of Death Act 1823, it was the only crime other than murder for which a death sentence was mandatory. Since the Crime and Disorder Act 1998 became law, the maximum sentence for treason in the UK has been life imprisonment.

The last treason trial was that of William Joyce, "Lord Haw-Haw", who was executed by hanging in 1946. The last conviction under a Treason Act was of Jaswant Singh Chail in 2023, who was charged with an offence relating to a plot to kill Queen Elizabeth II. At the time of the trial his offences were referred to in the media as simply "treason", but the statute he was charged under describes it as "a high misdemeanour".

== Offences ==
High treason today consists of:

- Treason Act 1351 (as amended – last amended by the Succession to the Crown Act 2013):
  - compassing the death of the sovereign, or of the king's wife (but not a ruling queen's husband), (Note: Sir William Blackstone wrote: "the husband of such a queen is not comprised within these words, and therefore no treason can be committed against him.") or the sovereign's eldest child and heir
  - violating the king's wife, or the sovereign's eldest unmarried daughter, or the sovereign's eldest son's wife (only if the eldest son is also heir to the throne)
  - levying war against the sovereign in the realm
  - adhering to the sovereign's enemies, giving them aid and comfort, in the realm or elsewhere
  - killing the King's Chancellor, Treasurer (an office long in commission) or Justices
- Treason Act 1702 and Treason Act (Ireland) 1703:
  - attempting to hinder the succession to the throne under the Bill of Rights 1689 and the Act of Settlement 1701
- Treason Act 1708:
  - killing the Lords of Session or Lords of Justiciary in Scotland
  - (in Scots law only) counterfeiting the Great Seal of Scotland

For detail about the offences created by the 1351 Act, see § History: England and Wales.

=== Northern Ireland ===
In addition to the acts of 1351 and 1703, two additional acts passed by the old Parliament of Ireland apply to Northern Ireland alone. The following is also treason:

- Treason Act (Ireland) 1537:
  - attempting bodily harm to the king, queen, or their heirs apparent
  - attempting to deprive them of their title
  - publishing that the sovereign is a heretic, tyrant, infidel or usurper of the Crown
  - rebelliously withholding from the sovereign his fortresses, ships, artillery etc.
- Crown of Ireland Act 1542:
  - doing anything to endanger the sovereign's person
  - doing anything which might disturb or interrupt the sovereign's possession of the Crown

Although the Act of Supremacy (Ireland) 1560 (2 Eliz. 1 c. 1 (I)) is still in force, it is no longer treason to contravene it.

=== Treason felony ===
In addition to the crime of treason, the Treason Felony Act 1848 (still in force today) created a new offence known as treason felony, with a maximum sentence of life imprisonment instead of death (but today, due to the abolition of the death penalty, the maximum penalty both for high treason and treason felony is the same—life imprisonment). Under the traditional categorisation of offences into treason, felonies, and misdemeanours, treason felony was merely another form of felony. Several categories of treason which had been introduced by the Sedition Act 1661 were reduced to felonies. While the common law offences of misprision and compounding were abolished in respect of felonies (including treason felony) by the Criminal Law Act 1967, which abolished the distinction between misdemeanour and felony, misprision of treason and compounding treason are still offences under the common law.

It is treason felony to "compass, imagine, invent, devise, or intend":

- to deprive the sovereign of the Crown,
- to levy war against the sovereign "in order by force or constraint to compel her to change her measures or counsels, or in order to put any force or constraint upon or in order to intimidate or overawe both Houses or either House of Parliament", or
- to "move or stir" any foreigner to invade the United Kingdom or any other country belonging to the sovereign.

=== Treason Act 1842 ===
Section 2 of the Treason Act 1842 creates offences of assaulting or alarming the Sovereign or having a weapon in the Sovereign's presence. This is described as "a high misdemeanour" and has a maximum sentence of seven years.

== History: England and Wales ==
In England, there was no clear common law definition of treason; it was for the king and his judges to determine if an offence constituted treason. Thus, the process became open to abuse, and decisions were often arbitrary. For instance, during the reign of Edward III, a knight was convicted of treason because he assaulted one of the king's subjects and held him for a ransom of £90. It was only in 1351 that Parliament passed legislation on the subject of treason. Under the Treason Act 1351, or "Statute of Treasons", which distinguished between high and petty treason, several distinct offences constitute high treason; most of them continue to do so, while those relating to forgery have been relegated to ordinary offences.

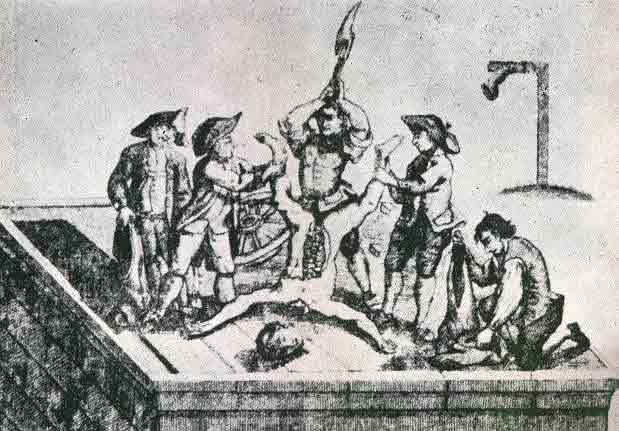
To be hanged, drawn and quartered was from 1351 a penalty in England for common men convicted of high treason.

First, it was high treason to "compass or imagine the death of our Lord the King, of our Lady his Queen, or of their eldest son and heir." The terms "compass or imagine" indicate the premeditation of a murder; it would not be high treason to accidentally kill the sovereign or any other member of the royal family (though someone could be charged with manslaughter). However it has also been held to include rebelling against or trying to overthrow the monarch, as experience has shown that this normally involves the monarch's death. The terms of this provision have been held to include both male and female sovereigns, but only the spouses of male sovereigns. It is not sufficient to merely allege that an individual is guilty of high treason because of his thoughts or imaginations; there must be an overt act indicating the plot.

A second form of high treason defined by the Treason Act 1351 was having sexual intercourse with "the King's companion, or the King's eldest daughter unmarried, or the wife of the King's eldest son and heir." If the intercourse is not consensual, only the rapist is liable, but if it is consensual, then both parties are liable. Anne Boleyn and Catherine Howard, wives of Henry VIII, were found guilty of treason for this reason. The jurist Sir William Blackstone writes that "the plain intention of this law is to guard the Blood Royal from any suspicion of bastardy, whereby the succession to the Crown might be rendered dubious." Thus, only women are covered in the statute; it is not, for example, high treason to rape a queen regnant's husband. Similarly, it is not high treason to rape a widow of the sovereign or of the heir apparent.

In 1994, the book Princess in Love by Anna Pasternak, for which James Hewitt was a major source, alleged that Hewitt had a five-year affair with Diana, Princess of Wales from 1986 to 1991. Diana confirmed the affair in her 1995 Panorama interview. As she was then the wife of the Prince of Wales, heir to the throne, this fitted the definition of high treason, and a national newspaper briefly attempted to have Hewitt prosecuted for what was then still a capital offence.

It is high treason "if a man do levy war against our Lord the King in his realm" or "if a man be adherent to the King's enemies in his realm, giving to them aid and comfort in the realm or elsewhere." Conspiracy to levy war or aid the sovereign's enemies do not amount to this kind of treason, though it may be encompassing the Sovereign's death. In modern times only these kinds of treason have actually been prosecuted (during the World Wars and the Easter Rising).

The Treason Act 1351 made it high treason to "slay the Chancellor, Treasurer, or the King's justices of the one bench or the other, justices in eyre, or justices of assize, and all other justices assigned to hear and determine, being in their places doing their offices." The office of Lord High Treasurer has been in commission since 1714 and as such, it is not currently possible to commit treason in respect of the holder of that office.

The last types of high treason defined by the Treason Act 1351 were the forgery of the Great Seal or Privy Seal, the counterfeiting of English (later British) money and the importing of money known to be counterfeit. These offences, however, were reduced to felonies rather than high treasons by the Forgery Act 1861 and Coinage Act 1832 (2 & 3 Will. 4. c. 34) respectively.

Finally, the Treason Act 1351 specified that the listing of offences was meant to be exhaustive. Only Parliament, not the courts, could add to the list. It provided that if "other like cases of treason may happen in time to come, which cannot be thought of nor declared at present", the court may refer the matter to the King and Parliament, which could then determine the matter by passage of an act. (See constructive treason.)

After the passage of the Treason Act 1351, several other offences were deemed to comprise high treason by act of Parliament. Parliament seemed especially unrestrained during the reign of Edward III's successor, Richard II. Numerous new offences—including intending to kill the Sovereign (even without an overt act demonstrating such intent) and killing an ambassador—were declared treasonable by the Treason Act 1397 (21 Ric. 2. c. 12). Richard II, however, was deposed; his successor, Henry IV, rescinded the legislation and restored the standard of Edward III.

In 1495 Poynings' Law extended English law to cover Ireland.

From the reign of Henry IV onwards, several new offences were made treasons; most legislation on the subject was passed during the reign of Henry VIII. It became high treason to deface money; to escape from prison whilst detained for committing treason, or to aid in an escape of a person detained for treason; to commit arson to extort money; to refer to the Sovereign offensively in public writing; to counterfeit the Sovereign's sign manual, signet or privy seal; to refuse to abjure the authority of the Pope; to marry any of the Sovereign's children, sisters, aunts, nephews or nieces without royal permission; to marry the Sovereign without disclosing prior sexual relationships; attempting to enter into a sexual relationship (out of marriage) with the Queen or a Princess; denying the Sovereign's official styles and titles; and refusing to acknowledge the Sovereign as the Supreme Head of the Church of England. Some offences, whose complexion was entirely different from traitorous actions, were nevertheless made treasons; thus, it was high treason for a Welshman to steal cattle, to commit murder by poisoning (1531), or for an assembly of twelve or more rioters to refuse to disperse when so commanded.

All new forms of high treason introduced since the Treason Act 1351, except those to do with forgery and counterfeiting, were abrogated by the Treason Act 1547 (1 Edw. 6 c. 12), which was passed at the beginning of the reign of Edward VI. The act created new kinds of treason, however, including denying that the King was the Supreme Head of the Church, and attempting to interrupt the succession to the throne as determined by the Act of Succession 1543.

When Mary I became queen in 1553, she passed the Treason Act 1553 (1 Mar. Sess. 1 c. 1), abolishing all treasons whatsoever which had been created since 1351. Later that year, however, the offence of forging the Sovereign's sign manual or signet once again became high treason under the Treason (No. 2) Act 1553 (1 Mar. Sess. 2 c. 6). Furthermore, the anti-counterfeiting laws were extended so as to include foreign money deemed legal tender in England. Thus, it became high treason to counterfeit such foreign money, or to import counterfeit foreign money and actually attempt to use it to make a payment. (But importing any counterfeit English money remained high treason, even if no attempt were made to use it in payment.) Mary also made it high treason under the Treason Act 1554 (1 & 2 Ph. & M. c. 10) to kill Philip II of Spain, her king consort, or to try to deprive him of his title.

In the reign of William III, Parliament made it high treason to manufacture, buy, sell or possess instruments whose sole purpose is to coin money. He also made adding any inscription normally found on a coin to any piece of metal that may resemble a coin high treason. In the reign of George II, Parliament made it high treason to mark or colour a silver coin so as to make it resemble a gold one.

Aside from laws relating to counterfeiting and succession, very few acts concerning the definition of high treason were passed. Under the Act of Supremacy 1558, passed during the reign of Elizabeth I, it was high treason for an individual to attempt to defend the jurisdiction of the Pope over the English Church for a third time (a first offence being a misdemeanour and a second offence a felony), or for a Roman Catholic priest to enter the realm and refuse to conform to the English Church, or, under the Religion Act 1580, to purport to release a subject of his allegiance to the Crown or the Church of England and to reconcile him or her with a foreign power. Charles II's Sedition Act 1661 made it treason to imprison, restrain or wound the king. Although this law was repealed in the United Kingdom in 1998, it still continues to apply in some Commonwealth countries. Under laws passed after James II was deposed, it became treasonable to correspond with the Jacobite claimants, or to hinder succession to the Throne under the Act of Settlement 1701, or to publish that anyone other than the individual specified by the Act of Settlement had the right to inherit the Crown.

== History: after union with Scotland ==
In 1708, following the Union of England and Scotland in the previous year, Queen Anne signed the Treason Act 1708 (effective from 1 July 1709), which replaced Scotland's treason laws with England's. The English offences of high treason and misprision of treason (but not petty treason) were extended to Scotland, and the treasonable offences then existing in Scotland were abolished. These were: "theft in Landed Men", murder in breach of trust, fire-raising, "firing coalheughs" and assassination. The Act also made it treason to counterfeit the Great Seal of Scotland, or to slay the Lords of Session or Lords of Justiciary "sitting in Judgment in the Exercise of their Office within Scotland".

In general, treason law in Scotland remained the same as in England, except that when in England the offence of counterfeiting the Great Seal of the United Kingdom etc. (an offence under other legislation) was reduced from treason to felony by the Forgery Act 1861, that Act did not apply to Scotland, and though in England since 1861 it has not been treason to forge the Scottish Great Seal, in Scotland this remains treason today. When the Scottish Parliament was set up in 1998, treason and treason felony were among the "reserved matters" it was prohibited from legislating about, ensuring that the law of treason remains uniform throughout Great Britain.

Between 1817 and 1820 it was treason to kill the Prince Regent. In 1832 counterfeiting money ceased to be treason and became a felony. In Ireland, counterfeiting seals ceased to be treason in 1861, in line with England and Wales.

=== First World War ===
A notable treason trial occurred at the Old Bailey in 1916 when Roger Casement was convicted of collusion with Germany for his role in the Easter Rising in Ireland. The charges against him were conspiracy to incite mutiny among Prisoners of War held captive by Germany, collusion with an enemy power in times of war, arms trafficking, and levying war against the King. Casement notably did not deny any of the charges brought against him and simply refused to acknowledge that the Treason Act 1351 even applied to him, leaving his defence counsel with few options beyond arguing about legal technicalities around the precise wording of the Act. The prosecution countered that as Casement had worked as a diplomat for the British Government for almost all of his adult life and had accepted a knighthood and a pension from the Crown on retirement in 1911, he owed personal loyalty to the King when he committed the acts for which he was brought to trial. The jury agreed with the prosecution and found Casement guilty. He was hanged at Pentonville Prison on 3 August 1916.

The Titles Deprivation Act 1917 authorised the king to deprive peers of their peerage if they had assisted the enemy during the war, or voluntarily resided in enemy territory. This was mainly in response to the closeness of the British royal family with some German thrones, leading to the loss of British titles from the dukes of Saxe-Coburg and Gotha and Brunswick, the Crown Prince of Hanover, and the Viscount Taaffe. Whilst the act allowed for their descendants to petition for the restoration of these titles, as of 2025 no descendant has done so.

=== Second World War ===
John Amery was executed in 1945 after pleading guilty to eight charges of treason for efforts to recruit British prisoners of war into the British Free Corps and for making propaganda broadcasts for Nazi Germany.

The last execution for treason in the United Kingdom was held in 1946. William Joyce (also known as Lord Haw Haw) stood accused of levying war against King George VI by travelling to Germany in the early months of World War II and taking up employment as a broadcaster of pro-Nazi propaganda to British radio audiences. He was awarded a personal commendation by Adolf Hitler in 1944 for his contribution to the German war effort. On his capture at the end of the war, Parliament rushed through the Treason Act 1945 (8 & 9 Geo. 6. c. 44) to facilitate a trial that would have the same procedure as a trial for murder. Before the act, a trial for treason short of regicide involved an elaborate and lengthy medieval procedure. Although Joyce was born in the United States to an Irish father and an English mother, he had moved to Britain in his teens and applied for a British passport in 1933 which was still valid when he defected to Germany and so under the law he owed allegiance to Britain. He appealed against his conviction to the House of Lords on the grounds he had lied about his country of birth on the passport application and did not owe allegiance to any country at the beginning of the war. The appeal was not upheld and he was executed at Wandsworth Prison on 3 January 1946.

It is thought the strength of public feeling against Joyce as a perceived traitor was the driving force behind his prosecution. The only evidence offered at his trial that he had begun broadcasting from Germany while his British passport was valid was the testimony of a London police inspector who had questioned him before the war while he was an active member of the British Union of Fascists and claimed to have recognised his voice on a propaganda broadcast in the early weeks of the war (he already had previous convictions for assault and riotous assembly as a result of street fights with communists and anarchists).

==== Treachery Act 1940 ====
Until 1945 treason had its own rules of evidence and procedure which made it difficult to prosecute accused traitors, such as the need for two witnesses to the same offence. Consequently, in the Second World War it was perceived that there was a need for a new offence with which to deal with traitors more expediently. The Treachery Act 1940 created a new capital felony called treachery. Seventeen people were shot or hanged for this offence rather than for treason (one death sentence was commuted). Theodore Schurch was the last person to be put to death for treachery, in 1946. He was also the last person to be executed for a crime other than murder. Josef Jakobs, a German spy executed for treachery, was the last person to be executed in the Tower of London.

The Treachery Act 1940 was suspended in February 1946, and was repealed in 1967.

=== 1945 to 2015 ===
In June 1945 the Treason Act 1945 abolished the special rules of evidence and procedure formerly used in treason trials, and replaced them with the rules applicable to murder trials, to simplify the law. As discussed above, the last treason prosecutions occurred later that year.

From 1945, treason consisted of the offences which are treason today (see above), plus two other kinds. The Succession to the Crown Act 1707 made it treason to affirm that any person has a right to succeed to the Crown otherwise than according to the Act of Settlement and Acts of Union, or that the Crown and Parliament cannot legislate for the limitation of the succession to the Crown. This was abolished in 1967. The Treason Act 1795 made it treason to "compass, imagine, invent, devise or intend death or destruction, or any bodily harm tending to death or destruction, maim or wounding, imprisonment or restraint, of the person of ... the King." This was abolished in 1998, when the death penalty was also abolished.

On 26 March 2015 the Succession to the Crown Act 2013 came into effect, which amended the line of succession to the throne to give women the same right to succeed to the throne as their brothers. In consequence of this, the Treason Act 1351 was amended in two ways. Whereas it had been treason to encompass the death of the monarch's eldest son and heir, this was amended to cover an heir of either sex. It had also been treason to violate the wife of the monarch's eldest son, but the 2013 Act restricted this to cases where the eldest son is also the heir to the throne.

== Liability ==
As a general rule, no British criminal court has jurisdiction over the Sovereign, from whom they derive their authority. As Sir William Blackstone writes, "the law supposes an incapacity of doing wrong from the excellence and perfection ... of the King." Furthermore, to charge the sovereign with high treason would be inconsistent, as it would constitute accusing him of disloyalty to himself. After the English Civil War, however, Charles I was tried for treason against the people of England. His trial and execution were irregular; they were more accurately products of a revolution, rather than a legal precedent, and those responsible were themselves tried for treason after the monarchy was restored. However, a person who attempts to become the Sovereign without a valid claim can be held guilty of treason. Consequently, Lady Jane Grey was executed for treason for usurping the throne in 1553.

An alien resident in the United Kingdom owes allegiance to the Crown, and may be prosecuted for high treason. The only exception is an enemy lawful combatant in wartime, e.g. a uniformed enemy soldier on British territory.

A British subject resident abroad also continues to owe allegiance to the Crown. If he or she becomes a citizen of another state before a war during which he bears arms against the Crown, he or she is not guilty of high treason. On the other hand, becoming a citizen of an enemy state during wartime is high treason, as it constitutes adhering to the sovereign's enemies.

Insane individuals are not punished for their crimes. During the reign of Henry VIII, however, it was enacted that in the cases of high treason, an idiot could be tried in his absence as if he were perfectly sane. In the reign of Mary I, this statute was repealed. Today there are powers to send insane defendants to a mental hospital.

The Treason Act 1495 provides that in a civil war between two claimants to the throne, those who fight for the losing side cannot be held guilty of a crime merely for fighting against the winner.

=== Duress and marital coercion ===
Duress is not available as a defence to treason involving the death of the sovereign.

In England and Wales and in Northern Ireland, the former defence of marital coercion was not available to a wife charged with treason.

== Trial ==
Peers and their wives and widows were formerly entitled to be tried for treason and for felonies in the House of Lords or the Court of the Lord High Steward, the former being used in every case except when Parliament was not in session. In the House of Lords, the Lord High Steward presided, but the entire House acted as both judge and jury. In the Lord High Steward's Court, the Lord High Steward was a judge, and a panel of "Lords Triers" served as a jury. There was no right of peremptory challenge in either body. Trial by either body ceased in 1948, since when peers have been tried in the same courts as commoners.

Commoners, and now peers and their wives and widows, are entitled to be tried for high treason, and also for lesser crimes, by jury. Formerly, commoners were entitled to thirty-five peremptory challenges in cases of treason, but only twenty in cases of felony and none in cases of misdemeanours; all peremptory challenges, however, were abolished in 1988.

Another mode of trial for treason, and also for other crimes, is an impeachment trial in the House of Lords following impeachment by the House of Commons (which has not occurred since 1806). Normally, the Lord Chancellor presided during trials; when a peer is accused of high treason, however, the Lord High Steward must preside. By convention, however, the Lord Chancellor would be appointed Lord High Steward for the duration of the trial—the post of Lord High Steward ceased to be regularly filled in 1421, being revived only for trials of peers and for coronations.

Finally, it was possible for Parliament to pass an Act of attainder, which pronounces guilt without a trial. Historically, Acts of attainder have been used against political opponents when speedy executions were desired. In 1661, Parliament passed acts posthumously attainting Oliver Cromwell, Henry Ireton and John Bradshaw—who were previously involved in Charles I's trial—of treason. These three individuals were posthumously executed, the only people to suffer this fate under English treason laws. (In 1540, a Scottish court summoned Robert Leslie, who was deceased, for a trial for treason. The Estates-General declared the summons lawful; Leslie's body was exhumed, and his bones were presented at the bar of the court. This procedure was never used in England.)

== Procedure and evidence ==
=== Before 1945 ===
Certain special rules procedures have historically applied to high treason cases. The privilege of the peerage and parliamentary privilege precluded the arrest of certain individuals (including peers, wives and widows of peers and members of Parliament) in many cases, but treason was not included (nor were felony or breach of the peace). Similarly, an individual could not claim sanctuary when charged with high treason; this distinction between treasons and felonies was lost as sanctuary laws were repealed in the late 17th and early 19th century. The defendant, furthermore, could not claim the benefit of clergy in treason cases; but the benefit of the clergy, as well, was abolished during the 19th century.

Formerly, if an individual stood mute and refused to plead guilty or not guilty for a felony, he would be tortured until he enter a plea; if he died in the course of the torture, his lands would not be seized to the Crown, and his heirs would be allowed to succeed to them. In cases of high treason, however, an individual could not save his lands by refusing to enter a plea; instead, a refusal would be punished by immediate forfeiture of all estates. This distinction between treasons and felonies ended in 1772, when the court was permitted to enter a plea on a defendant's behalf.

Formerly, an individual was not entitled to assistance of counsel in any capital case, including treason; the rule, however, was abolished in treason cases by the Treason Act 1695. The same Act extended a rule from 1661 which had made it necessary to produce at least two witnesses to prove each alleged offence of high treason. Nearly one hundred years later a stricter version of this rule was incorporated into the Constitution of the United States. The 1695 Act also provided for a three-year time limit on bringing prosecutions for treason (except for assassinating the king) and misprision of treason, another rule which has been imitated in some common law countries.

These rules made it difficult to prosecute charges of treason, and the rule was relaxed by the Treason Act 1800 to make attempts on the life of the King subject to the same rules of procedure and evidence as existed in murder trials (which did not require two witnesses). This change was extended to all assaults on the Sovereign by section 1 of the Treason Act 1842. Finally the special rules for treason were abolished by the Treason Act 1945 when the rules of evidence and procedure in all cases of treason were made the same as for murder. However, the original three-year time limit stated above survived into the present day. This meant that when James Hewitt was accused of treason by the tabloid press in 1996 because of his affair with the Princess of Wales, he could not have been prosecuted because it could not be proved that he had done it within the foregoing three-year period.

=== Modern procedure ===
The procedure in trials for treason is the same as that in trials for murder. It is therefore an indictable-only offence.

=== Alternative verdict ===
England and Wales: On the trial of an indictment for treason, the jury cannot return an alternative verdict to the offence charged in that indictment under section 6(3) of the Criminal Law Act 1967. For example, the jury cannot give an alternative verdict of manslaughter in cases of the assassination of the monarch. The Homicide Act 1957 does not apply. However, under the common law the jury may return a verdict of guilty of misprision of treason instead of treason.

Northern Ireland: On the trial of an indictment for treason, the jury cannot return an alternative verdict to the offence charged in that indictment under section 6(2) of the Criminal Law Act (Northern Ireland) 1967.

=== Limitation ===
A person may not be indicted for treason committed within the United Kingdom (subject to the following exception) unless the indictment is preferred within three years of the commission of that offence. This limitation does not apply to treason which consists of designing, endeavouring or attempting to assassinate the sovereign. There is no time limit on the prosecution of treason committed outside of the United Kingdom.

The same time limit applies to attempting or conspiring to commit treason.

=== Bail ===
In England and Wales, a person charged with treason may not be granted bail except by order of a High Court judge or of the Secretary of State. The same rule applies in Northern Ireland.

In Scotland, all crimes and offences which are treason are bailable.

== Punishment ==
=== Before 1998 ===
The form of execution once suffered by traitors was often (though not invariably) torturous. For men the statutory penalty (in England) was to be hanged, drawn and quartered. The condemned could not walk or be carried to the place of execution; the sentence required that they were to be drawn: they might be dragged along the ground, but were normally tied onto a hurdle which was drawn to the place of execution by a horse. A man would then be hanged by a noose around the neck until almost dead. Whilst still alive, he would be cut down and allowed to drop to the ground, stripped of his clothes, his genitals cut off, his viscera pulled out and burnt before his own eyes, and other organs would be torn out of his body. The body would be decapitated, and cut into four quarters. The body parts would be at the disposal of the Sovereign, and generally they would be gibbeted or publicly displayed as a warning. The body parts would be parboiled in salt and cumin seed: the salt to prevent putrefaction, and the cumin seed to prevent birds pecking at the flesh. This sentence was amended in 1814 so that the offender would hang until dead; the disembowelling, beheading and quartering were to be carried out posthumously.

Women were excluded from this type of punishment and instead were drawn and then burned at the stake, until this was replaced with hanging by the Treason Act 1790 and the Treason by Women Act (Ireland) 1796.

The penalty for high treason by counterfeiting or clipping coins was the same as the penalty for petty treason (which for men was drawing and hanging without the torture and quartering, and for women was burning or hanging).

Individuals of noble birth were beheaded without being subjected to either form of torture. Commoners' sentences were sometimes commuted to beheading—a sentence not formally removed from British law until 1973.

In addition to being tortured and executed, a traitor was also deemed attainted. The first consequence of attainder was forfeiture; all lands and estates of a traitor were forever forfeit to the Crown. A second consequence was corruption of blood; the attainted person could neither inherit property, nor transmit it to his or her descendants.

In 1832 the death penalty was abolished for treason by forging seals and the royal sign manual.

In 1870, attainder was abolished. In the same year in England, and in 1949 in Scotland, posthumous drawing and quartering was abolished, and so the sole punishment was hanging.

Beheading was abolished in 1973, by which time it had long been obsolete, having last been used in 1747.

By 1965, capital punishment had been abolished for almost all crimes, but was still mandatory (unless the offender was pardoned or the sentence commuted) for high treason until 1998. By section 36 of the Crime and Disorder Act 1998 the maximum punishment for high treason became life imprisonment.

- The last beheading of a peer for high treason was that of Simon Fraser, 11th Lord Lovat in 1747.
- The last execution by burning for high treason was that of Catherine Murphy in 1789.
- The last sentences of hanging, drawing and quartering were those on the Cato Street Conspirators in 1820; however the drawing and quartering were omitted by royal command.
- One of the last executions for high treason was that of John Amery in 1945, the last person in the United Kingdom to plead guilty to high treason.
- The last execution of any kind for high treason was that of William Joyce by hanging in 1946.

=== Today ===
A person convicted of treason is liable to imprisonment for life or for any shorter term. A whole life tariff may be imposed for the gravest offences, but not for offenders under 18.

Treason also entails disqualification from public office, and loss of suffrage (except in local elections). This rule does not apply in Scotland.

== Devolved legislatures ==
Treason (including constructive treason) is a reserved matter on which the Scottish Parliament and the Senedd cannot legislate.

Treason (but not powers of arrest or criminal procedure) is an excepted matter on which the Northern Ireland Assembly cannot legislate.

== Treason today ==
Almost all treason-related offences introduced since the Treason Act 1351 was passed have been abolished or relegated to lesser offences. The Treason Act 1351, on the other hand, has not been significantly amended; the main changes involve the removal of counterfeiting and forgery, as explained above. For the state of the law today, see the Offences section above.

In Autumn 2001, following 9/11, the British government threatened British citizens who fought for the Taliban army in Afghanistan against Anglo-American troops with prosecution for treason, although no one was subsequently tried, at least not for treason.

On 8 August 2005, it was reported that the UK Government was considering bringing prosecutions for treason against a number of British Islamic clerics who have publicly spoken positively about acts of terrorism against civilians in Britain, or attacks on British soldiers abroad, including the 7 July London bombings and numerous attacks on troops serving in Iraq and Afghanistan. Following this threat one foreign cleric who the British government had failed to deport fled to Lebanon, only to request to be rescued by the British military during the 2006 Israel–Hezbollah War. However, later that year prosecutors indicted Abu Hamza al-Masri for inciting murder (he was convicted in February 2006).

In 2008, former attorney general Lord Goldsmith QC published a report on his review of British citizenship. One of his recommendations was for a "thorough reform and rationalisation of the law" of treason.

In 2014, the Foreign Secretary, Philip Hammond, revealed that the British Government was considering high treason charges for Islamic extremists in response to growing numbers of British fighters travelling to Syria and Iraq to join the Islamic State of Iraq and the Levant. However, this did not come to pass.

On 2 August 2022, Jaswant Singh Chail was charged with offences under section 2 of the Treason Act 1842, and also with making threats to kill and possessing an offensive weapon, a crossbow. He had been arrested in the grounds of Windsor Castle on 25 December 2021 and was charged with "discharging or aiming firearms, or throwing or using any offensive matter or weapon, with intent to injure or alarm her Majesty". On 3 February 2023, he pleaded guilty at the Old Bailey, and, on 5 October 2023, he was sentenced to a total of nine years' imprisonment for the three offences (including 44 months for the Treason Act offence), with an additional five years on extended licence. Chail was the first person since 1981 to be convicted of an offence under a Treason Act. He was widely reported by the media to have been convicted of treason, but the offence under section 2 is not treason but a lesser offence ("a high misdemeanour") which carries a maximum sentence of seven years (the name of the 1842 act is because section 1, now repealed, was about treason).

=== Acts in force today ===
==== Acts containing substantive or procedural law ====
- Treason Act 1351 (most forms of treason)
- Treason Act 1495 (special defence to treason)
- Treason Act (Ireland) 1537 (Northern Ireland only)
- Crown of Ireland Act 1542 (Northern Ireland only)
- Treason Act 1695 (time limit on prosecution)
- Treason Act 1702 (a further form of treason)
- Treason Act (Ireland) 1703 (equivalent to Treason Act 1702)
- Treason Act 1708 (Scotland only)
- Treason Act 1814 and Forfeiture Act 1870 (the penalty for treason)
- Treason (Ireland) Act 1821 (extended provisions of the 1695 Act to Ireland and still applies today in Northern Ireland)
- Treason Felony Act 1848 (still-existing offences which used to be treason)

==== Acts creating similar offences ====
See also the Treason Act 1842 (assaulting the monarch), the Official Secrets Acts 1911 to 1989 (espionage), the Trading with the Enemy Act 1939 and the Terrorism Acts.

== See also ==
- List of the Treason Acts
