= Regnal years of English and British monarchs =

Regnal years ("nth year of the reign of King X", abbreviated to "n X", etc.) are utilised in many official British government and legal documents of historical interest, notably parliamentary statutes prior to 1963, and prior to 1867 in the case law collected in the year books, nominative reporters, and digests, and in the reports republished in the English Reports and Revised Reports.

== Overview ==
For centuries, English official public documents have been dated according to the regnal years of the ruling monarch. Traditionally, parliamentary statutes are referenced by regnal year, e.g. the Occasional Conformity Act 1711 is officially referenced as "10 Ann. c. 6" (read as "the sixth chapter of the statute of the parliamentary session that sat in the 10th year of the reign of Queen Anne").

Regnal years are calculated from the official date (year, month and day) of a monarch's accession. For example, King George III acceded on 25 October 1760. That marks the beginning of his first regnal year. His second regnal year starts on 25 October 1761, his third regnal year on 25 October 1762, and so on. When a monarch dies, abdicates or is deposed, the regnal year comes to an end (whether the full year has run its course or not). A new regnal year begins from a new date, with a new monarch.

As different monarchs begin their reigns at different times, the exact month and day when a regnal year begins varies across reigns. For example, Elizabeth I's regnal year starts on 17 November, James I's on 24 March, Charles I's on 27 March, and so on.

The table below gives the dates of the regnal years for Kings of England (and subsequently Great Britain), from 1066 to the present day. These are official de jure dates, and may or may not coincide with whether a particular king had de facto power or not at that time. For example, as the Commonwealth era was suppressed in the official record, the regnal years of Charles II are measured from 30 January 1649 (the day his father Charles I was executed); as a result, when Charles II actually became king, on 29 May 1660, he was already in his 12th regnal year (For the de facto tabulation of English rulers, see any conventional list of English monarchs).

Regnal years on the table below are recorded only for Kings of England (and subsequently Great Britain, and later the United Kingdom). These are not regnal years of Kings of Scotland nor Ireland, which have their own regnal dates.

=== Legal year ===
The regnal year is distinct from the official "legal year" – that is, the calendar used for legal, civic and ecclesiastical purposes. The legal year also did not always coincide with the start date for the historical year. Until the 13th century, the English legal year began at Christmas (25 December). From the 13th century until 1752, the legal year began on 25 March (Lady Day). It is only since 1752 that the legal year was re-set to coincide with the start of the historical calendar year (1 January) (see Calendar (New Style) Act 1750).

This means that the year "1575" in official records begins on 25 March, 1575 and ends 24 March, 1576 in normal historical date.

This includes Church of England records, like baptism, marriage and burial dates. Careless biographers relying on infant baptism records often misstate the age of individuals born between January and March, believing them a full year older than they really are (e.g. someone born 10 March 1576 would be recorded as "10 March 1575").

These date differences can be confusing when sorting dates in old documents before 1753. For example, the reign of Charles I came to an end with his execution on 30 January 1649, but contemporary records such as the House of Commons Journals record this as 30 January 1648. To account for this complication, it is customary for historians referring to official or legal events between 1 January and 25 March to write the year down in "double-barrelled" format (e.g. "30 January 1648–49", the former being the legal year, the latter the historical year).

The regnal years listed below are given in normal historical date (not legal year). So a parliamentary statute that was passed on, say, 10 February 1585 (in normal calendar date) would be dated in the official record as 10 February 1584 (the legal year), and simultaneously said to have been passed in the 27th year of Elizabeth I (the regnal year that started on 17 November 1584).

Adoption of 1 January as the start date for the year was one of Gregorian calendar reforms introduced by Pope Gregory XIII in 1582, and was quickly adopted in most Catholic countries. Protestant Scotland began using 1 January in 1600 (but not the rest of the Gregorian calendar until 1752). The double-barrelled format was commonly used in Dutch documents, as two provinces (Holland & Zeeland) had adopted the Gregorian reform early (1583), but the remaining provinces of the Netherlands only adopted it later (1700).

Most of the European continent had already transitioned from 25 March to 1 January by the mid-17th century, when there were many English exiles abroad. Use of the double-barrelled format (e.g. 1674-75 or 1674/75) begins to occasionally appear in England, both in private and public records, already by the late 17th century. English writers of this era (e.g. Samuel Pepys's diary), tended to stick to the 25 March start date, especially if they were writing only for English audiences. Nonetheless, some English periodicals (newspapers, magazines, reviews, almanacs), which exploded in the early 1700s, used the historical year with 1 January start date and often did not bother with double-barrelling.

The 1751 Act reforming the legal year also officially introduced to England the Gregorian calendar on Thursday 14 September 1752. Up until then, England had been using the Julian calendar, which by that time was eleven days behind the calendar of most countries on the European Continent. So events before 1752 in English records often differ from European records, and it is sometimes necessary to refer to both sets of dates using "Old Style" (Julian) and "New Style" (Gregorian) notation, (see Old Style and New Style dates). By way of calculation, OS was ten days behind NS until 1700, and eleven days behind NS after 1700.

- e.g. William of Orange's armada landed in England on 5 November 1688 (OS) or 15 November 1688 (NS).
- e.g. Queen Anne died on 1 August 1714 (OS) or 12 August 1714 (NS).

The dates in the table below follow the English calendar (OS until 1752, NS thereafter).

Anyone handling old dates need to be cautious with variations. A document dated 5 March 1611 in England would be dated 5 March 1612 in Scotland, 15 March 1612 in France and 5/15 March 1611/12 in the Netherlands.

== Regnal calendar table ==
To calculate the regnal year from a particular date, one subtracts the first regnal year from the calendar year in question. The year is not adjusted if the month and day falls before the regnal date, and if it falls on or after the regnal date, add one.

- Example 1: 4 July 1776. This falls in the reign of George III, whose first regnal year is 1760; so 1776 – 1760 = 16th year of his reign (4 July is before 25 October).
- Example 2: 2 May 1662. This is in the reign of Charles II, whose first regnal year is 1649. So 1662 – 1649 = 13, add 1 because 2 May is after 30 January, so the date falls in the 14th regnal year of Charles II.

Monarch	No. of years	First regnal year	Regnal year start date	Regnal year end date	End of final year
William I	21	1066	14 October	13 October	9 September 1087
William II	13	1087	26 September	25 September	2 August 1100
Henry I	36	1100	5 August	4 August	1 December 1135
Stephen	19	1135	26 December (Note: Empress Matilda, who claimed the English throne, and actually ruled substantial parts of England between 1141 and 1148, is excluded from the official record. Stephen's years are unbroken.)	25 December	25 October 1154
Henry II	35	1154	19 December	18 December	6 July 1189
Richard I	10	1189	3 September (Note: The coronation date of King Richard I of England (3 September 1189) is the official limit of legal memory in English law. This date was first established in the Statute of Westminster 1275 (3 Edward I c.39), and subsequently generalized. Except in a few limited cases, lawsuits cannot rely on documents, deeds, etc. dated from before 1189, nor refer to activities occurring before 1189. This effectively nullified all attempts to recover prior Anglo-Saxon property and titles seized during the Norman Conquest of 1066. It is also why Anglo-Saxon kings of England have no regnal years and no presence on this list, and anything from that era is just regarded as "time immemorial" in English law.)	2 September	6 April 1199
John	18	1199	Ascension Day (varied, May/June) (Note: King John's regnal years are unusual for not starting on the same date every year, but rather on Ascension Day, a movable feast of the liturgical calendar. Start dates for John's regnal years are (Sweet & Maxwell's Guide 1962, p. 23): Year 1 – 27 May 1199; Year 2 – 18 May 1200; Year 3 – 3 May 1201; Year 4 – 23 May 1202; Year 5 – 15 May 1203; Year 6 – 3 June 1204; Year 7 – 19 May 1205; Year 8 – 11 May 1206; Year 9 – 31 May 1207; Year 10 – 15 May 1208; Year 11 – 7 May 1209; Year 12 – 27 May 1210; Year 13 – 12 May 1211; Year 14 – 3 May 1212; Year 15 – 23 May 1213; Year 16 – 8 May 1214; Year 17 – 28 May 1215; Year 18 – 19 May 1216)	varied, May/June	19 October 1216
Henry III	57	1216	28 October	27 October	16 November 1272
Edward I	35	1272	20 November	20 November (Note: Edward I's regnal years are unusual for starting and ending on the same day (20 November), rather than ending one day, and starting the next.)	7 July 1307
Edward II	20	1307	8 July	7 July	20 January 1327
Edward III	51 (England), 38 (France) (Note: Edward III is given two different regnal years, one for England, and another for France (the only claimant for whom this is done). English years are unbroken between 1327 and 1377. French years are counted from the start date of 25 January 1340 (beginning of Year 1 France and Year 14 England), and interrupted on 8 May 1360 (end of Year 21 France); the French numbering resumes on 11 June 1369 as beginning of French Year 30, and follows the English start/end dates (25/24 January) thereafter until 21 June 1377, the end of English year 51 and French year 38.)	1327	25 January	24 January	21 June 1377
Richard II	23	1377	22 June (Note: From Richard II onwards, every new king's regnal year begins exactly on the day on or after the end of the previous king's reign (previous transitions often had a gap of several days, sometimes weeks). Henceforth, in official terms, "England always has a king", i.e. there will not be a day in subsequent English history without a reigning monarch (with the exception of the Glorious Revolution of 1688–1689; see below).)	21 June	29 September 1399
Henry IV	14	1399	30 September (Note: By coincidence, the regnal year of Henry IV, which begins on 30 September 1399, happens to coincide with the "exchequer year" (which always begins 30 September and ends 29 September). This is the only reign for which the regnal year and exchequer year (and their labels) match exactly.)	29 September	20 March 1413
Henry V	10	1413	21 March	20 March	31 August 1422
Henry VI	39 + 1 (Note: Henry VI was deposed by Edward IV on 4 March 1461, officially bringing his reign and last regnal year (39th) to a close. However, Henry VI briefly recovered the throne in 1470–1471 - Edward IV fled England on 29 September 1470, Henry VI was released from captivity on 3 October and re-crowned on 13 October. In official records, Henry VI has an extra regnal year, dated from 9 October 1470 to his capture on 11 April 1471, referred to as the 49th year ("Anno ab inchoatione regni nostri") or 1st year of "readeption" ("Readeptionis nostrae regiae potestatis"). Henry VI's readeption year does not mar the continuity of Edward IV's regnal years – Edward IV's 10th Year is counted unbroken as beginning from 4 March 1470 and ending 3 March 1471, his 11th year beginning 4 March 1471, etc.)	1422	1 September	31 August	4 March 1461
Edward IV	23	1461	4 March	3 March	9 April 1483
Edward V	1	1483	9 April	25 June (Note: Kings Edward V (Apr-Jun, 1483) and Edward VIII (Jan-Dec, 1936) are the only kings who did not complete one full regnal year. They were deposed or abdicated before the end of their first year.)	25 June 1483
Richard III	3	1483	26 June	25 June	22 August 1485
Henry VII	24	1485	22 August	21 August	21 April 1509
Henry VIII	38	1509	22 April	21 April	28 January 1547
Edward VI	7	1547	28 January	27 January	6 July 1553
"Mary" (Note: The Tudor queen Mary I ruled from 1553 to 1558, but in official records her first two regnal years are referred to simply as "Mary" and the rest of her regnal years as "Philip and Mary". Notice there are no royal ordinals attached. In legal citations, the two regnal years of Mary I alone are rendered simply as "Mary" without an ordinal number, as they do not need to be distinguished from any other years of that name. The later Stuart queen Mary II does not have regnal years under her separate name, but only as "William and Mary".)	2	1553	6 July (Note: Lady Jane Grey, the "Nine Days Queen", who was Queen Jane from 6 July 1553 to 17 July 1553, is not present in the official record. Mary I's reign officially begins on 6 July 1553.)	5 July	24 July 1554 (Note: Mary I married the Habsburg prince Philip (future Philip II of Spain) on 25 July 1554, who was promptly made co-ruler of England. Their joint reign is officially referred to as "Philip and Mary", but the numbering of their regnal years is not reset to 1 for both, but rather retained separately for each. So the first year of "Philip and Mary", which begins on 25 July 1554, is officially referred to as "1 & 2" (1st year of Philip, 2nd year of Mary). There is the complication, of course, that Mary's previous regnal year began on 6 July, a few weeks before Philip's start date of 25 July. So the numbers between those two days are adjusted. Taken continuously, the regnal year numbers are: 1 Mary : 6 July 1553 – 5 Jul 1554; 2 Mary : 6 Jul 1554 – 24 Jul 1554; 1 & 2 Philip and Mary : 25 Jul 1554 – 5 Jul 1555; 1 & 3 Philip and Mary: 6 Jul 1555 – 24 Jul 1555; 2 & 3 Philip and Mary; 25 Jul 1555 – 5 Jul 1556; 2 & 4 Philip and Mary: 6 Jul 1556 – 24 Jul 1556; 3 & 4 Philip and Mary; 25 Jul 1556 – 5 Jul 1557; 3 & 5 Philip and Mary: 6 Jul 1557 – 24 Jul 1557; 4 & 5 Philip and Mary; 25 Jul 1557 – 5 Jul 1558; 4 & 6 Philip and Mary: 6 Jul 1558 – 24 Jul 1558; 5 & 6 Philip and Mary: 25 Jul 1558 – 17 November 1558)
"Philip and Mary"	5	1554	25 July	24 July	17 November 1558
Elizabeth I	45	1558	17 November	16 November	24 March 1603
James I	23 (Note: James Charles Stuart was King James VI of Scotland since 24 July 1567, and so was already in his 36th Scottish regnal year when he ascended to the English throne as James I of England on 24 March 1603. The two numbers (and start dates) are kept separate. On English statutes and documents, James I's English regnal numbering are often followed by his Scottish regnal numbering. To convert an English date into James's Scottish numbering, add 35 to the English year (if before 24 July) or 36 (if after 24 July). (Cheney, 2000: p.39))	1603	24 March	23 March	27 March 1625
Charles I	24	1625	27 March	26 March	30 January 1649
Charles II	37 (Note: The Commonwealth era (1649–1660) is obliterated from the official record. The beginning regnal date of Charles II is 30 January 1649, the day his father was executed. However, Charles II would only become de facto king on 29 May 1660, officially regarded as the 12th year of his reign. During the Commonwealth era, public documents did not have any regnal or republican calendar, just the conventional calendar date, the "Year of Our Lord", with normal month and day.)	1649	30 January	29 January	6 February 1685
James II	4	1685	6 February	5 February	11 December 1688 (Note: The English official record regards James II as having abdicated on 11 December 1688, the day he slipped out of London (he was captured the next day in Rochester). His formal deposition did not take instrument until 12 February 1689, by a declaration of the convention of old parliamentarians at Westminster (see "Glorious Revolution"), which backdated the "abdication" to 11 December. That declaration was entered into statute law later that year, in December 1689 (1 Will & Mar., 2nd Sess., c.2).)
"William and Mary"	6	1689	13 February (Note: This is the exception to "England always has a King" rule, prevailing since the reign of Richard II. With James II officially abdicating on 11 December 1688, and William & Mary officially beginning 13 February 1689, there is a space of nearly two months in which England, officially speaking, is without a monarch. The explicit phrase "the throne being thereby vacant" was entered into the 1689 abdication statute.)	12 February	27 December 1694
William III	8 (7 to 14) (Note: In regnal numbering, the relationship between "William and Mary" and "William III" is a little tricky. In the Philip and Mary I case, back in the 1550s, each monarch was given their own regnal date and stuck with it. William III and Mary II ascended as monarchs on the same date (13 February 1689), and so it was unnecessary to state it as "1 & 1 William and Mary", but simply "1 William and Mary". But Mary's death (on 27 December 1694, in the 6th year of W & M) complicated numbering. If the 1550s model had been used, then William III should have continued on his 6th year until 13 February 1695, when the new regnal year, the 7th year of William III, should have begun. However, in this instance, the regnal start day (but not the year) was reset after Mary's death, so William III's 7th year began prematurely on 28 December 1694.)	1694	28 December	27 December	8 March 1702
Anne	13 (Note: Queen Anne of England was in her sixth regnal year when the Treaty of Union politically uniting the kingdoms of England and Scotland into the united "Kingdom of Great Britain" went into effect on 1 May 1707. Her regnal numbering is not affected nor reset by the union. Anne's 6th year continues unbroken, her 7th year starts on 8 March 1708, etc.)	1702	8 March	7 March	1 August 1714
George I	13	1714	1 August	31 July	11 June 1727
George II	34	1727	11 June (until 1752); 22 June (from 1753) (Note: According to Cheney (2000: p.42), the 1752 calendar reform led to a resetting of the start dates (but not years) of King George II. The calendar reform deducted 11 days from the month of September 1752, so the 26th regnal year of George II, which began on 11 June 1752, was extended to 21 June 1753, so that it would have exactly 365 days. Thereafter, from 1753 onwards, George II's regnal years begin on 22 June and end on 21 June. However, the table in (Sweet & Maxwell's Guide 1962, p. 31) does not reset but retains the original 11 June start date from 1753 down to 1760.)	10 June (until 1752); 21 Jun (from 1753)	25 October 1760
George III	60 (Note: King George III was in his 41st regnal year when Act of Union 1800 went into effect on 1 January 1801, politically uniting the Kingdom of Great Britain and the Kingdom of Ireland into the "United Kingdom of Great Britain and Ireland". His regnal numbering is not affected nor reset by the union. George III's 41st regnal year continues unbroken, his 42nd year starts 25 October 1801, etc.), (Note: George III was declared incapacitated on 5 February 1811, in the course of his 51st regnal year. However, the regnal dating was unaffected by the Regency, so regnal years were still measured by George III's regnal date of 25 October, until his death in 1820.)	1760	25 October	24 October	29 January 1820
George IV	11 (Note: George IV's period as prince regent (1811–1820) for his ailing father, George III, is not counted in his regnal numbering.)	1820	29 January	28 January	26 June 1830
William IV	7	1830	26 June	25 June	20 June 1837
Victoria	64	1837	20 June	19 June	22 January 1901
Edward VII	10	1901	22 January	21 January	6 May 1910
George V	26	1910	6 May	5 May	20 January 1936
Edward VIII	1	1936	20 January	11 December	11 December 1936
George VI	16	1936	11 December	10 December	5 February 1952
Elizabeth II	71	1952	6 February	5 February	8 September 2022
Charles III	4 (ongoing)	2022	8 September	7 September	

== Regnal citation ==
=== Latin names and abbreviations ===
On many English legal documents, including the head of statute rolls and statute compilations up until the mid-19th century, the regnal year is usually written out in Latin, e.g. "Anno Regni Georgii II vicesimo nono", meaning the 29th year of the reign of King George II. This is commonly referred to simply as "29 George II" in most English texts.

In dense or compact legal citations, the royal name is often abbreviated, and the royal ordinal is converted from Roman to Arabic numeral (e.g. "29 Geo. 2").

In the case of the Tudor queen Elizabeth I, the first monarch of that name, her abbreviated legal citations are rendered without an ordinal number in older sources, so the 25th year of Elizabeth I is simply "25 Eliz." The same applies for the first two regnal years of Tudor queen Mary I, who is rendered in legal citations simply as "Mary" (or "Mar.") without ordinal number, as the later Stuart queen Mary II does not have regnal years under her name alone, but only as "William and Mary".

Regnal name	Modern legal abbr.	17th cent. abbr.	Latin name
Anne	Ann.		Annae
Charles	Car.	Car.	Caroli
Edward	Edw.	E., Ed.	Edwardi
Elizabeth	Eliz.	El., Eliz.	Elizabethae
George	Geo.	G.	Georgii
Henry	Hen.	H.	Henrici
James	Jas.	Jac.	Jacobi
John	Joh.		Johannis
Mary	Mar.	M.	Mariae
Philip and Mary	Phil. & M.	P. & M.	Philippi & Mariae
Richard	Rich.	R.	Richardi
Victoria	Vict.		Victoriae
William	Will.	W.	Gulielmi
William and Mary	W. & M.		Gulielmi & Mariae

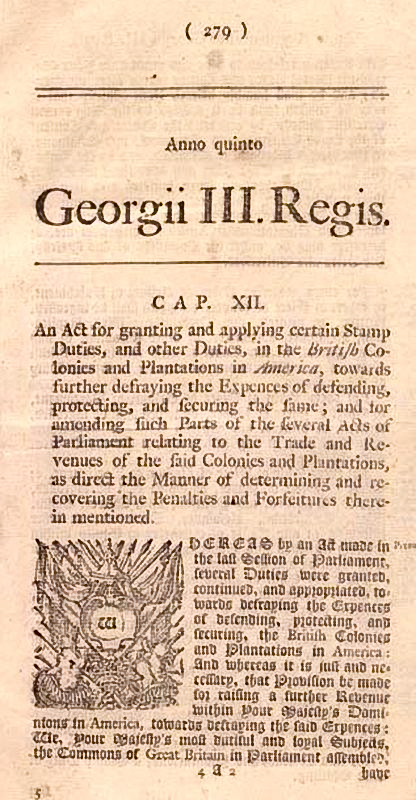
The Stamp Act 1765 (5 Geo. 3. c. 12)

Numbering (in Latin) for regnal year (anno):

Year	Anno (Latin)
1st	Primo
2nd	Secondo
3rd	Tertio
4th	Quarto
5th	Quinto
6th	Sexto
7th	Septimo
8th	Octavo
9th	Nono
10th	Decimo
11th	Undecimo
12th	Duodecimo
13th	Decimo tertio
14th-19th	Decimo nth, etc.
20th	Vicesimo
21st, etc.	Vicesimo primo, etc.
30th	Tricesimo
40th	Quadragesimo
50th	Quinquagesimo
60th	Sexagesimo

=== Chancery rolls ===
The use of regnal years in English official and legal citation emerged from the need to consult and reference government documents, statutes and proceedings. Since the Middle Ages, royal departments and courts (including parliaments) kept official records of their activities in the form of "rolls", organized and dated by regnal year.

Great Seal of King Edward III of England

English royal government was driven by documents from the king bestowing patronage, dispensing justice and issuing orders. During the Middle Ages, the office responsible for drafting these documents was the Chancery ("Cancellaria"). Official documents issued by the chancery (charters, letters patent, letters close, etc.) were authenticated with the Great Seal of England. The chancery was headed by the "Chancellor" (a position almost always held by a cleric until the early modern era) or, in his absence, the "Keeper of the Great Seal". The actual writing of documents was done by a stable of trained literate clerics, or "clerks of chancery", supervised by the chancellor. The chancellor or keeper would only affix the seal after reviewing and approving the written document.

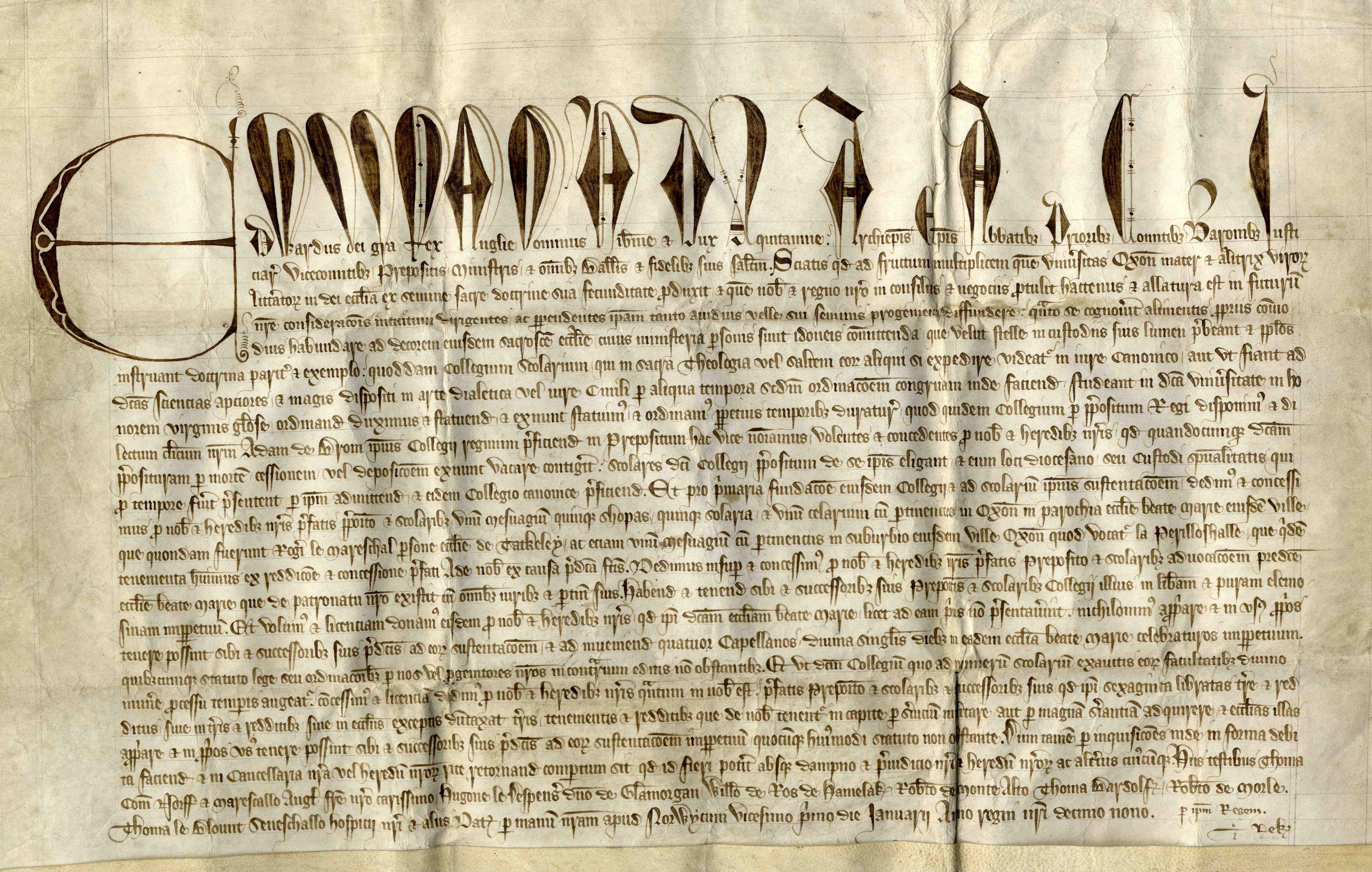
Royal letter patent issued to Oriel College, Oxford, dated "Anno Regni decimo nono" (19 Edward II), i.e. 21 January, 1326.

All these documents end with a statement of the date (usually in regnal years) and location it was composed. Few of these original documents survive. But records of their existence are found in chancery rolls.

The chancery maintained "rolls" (rotuli) to record the output of documents produced by the chancery. A roll is literally a long scroll of vellum parchment. A new roll was begun at the start of each regnal year. Each document issued is described on the roll, and entered by date.

Chancery rolls emerged around 1199, during the reign of King John of England. There were different rolls for different types of documents, e.g. charter rolls, patent rolls, close rolls, liberate rolls, fine rolls, etc. The office of Master of the Rolls stems from the senior clerk in the chancery, charged with ensuring the records were maintained. As few original documents remain, surviving chancery rolls is how historians often reconstruct the activities of the king and royal government.

As the main producer of official documents, the Chancery maintained the official regnal calendar, defining its names and dates. Other royal departments, law courts and parliaments borrowed the chancery's regnal calendar to date their own documents and rolls (with the peculiar exception of the Exchequer).

=== Feast citation ===
Between 13th and 16th centuries, it was common for English official and legal documents (acts, writs, deeds, etc.) to be dated by reference to the weekday relative to a nearby religious feast date and the regnal year, e.g. "Monday after feast of St. Luke Evangelist, 3 Henry V" meaning 21 October 1415.

Translating a feast citation to a historical calendar date involves looking up the liturgical calendar for the regnal year in question. The standard reference for date conversion is C.R. Cheney's Handbook of Dates.

England had four "quarter days" on which certain transactions, notably the payment of rents, were conducted every year:

- (1) Lady Day (feast of the Annunciation) (25 March)
- (2) Midsummer Day (feast of St. John the Baptist) (24 June)
- (3) Michaelmas Day (feast of St. Michael and all Angels) (29 September)
- (4) Christmas Day (feast of Nativity), (25 December)

It is not uncommon to find English documents or court judgments relating that a certain action goes into effect or has to be undertaken by one of these quarter days.

(Note this applies to English law jurisdiction only, Scotland and Ireland have entirely different quarter days).

=== Law Term citation ===
Many old legal documents (especially court documents like plea rolls) do not contain any specific day, but simply record the "law term" and regnal year, e.g. "Michaelmas term, 5 George II", meaning sometime in Oct-Nov, 1732.

Since time immemorial (allegedly since the days of Edward the Confessor), there was a division between "holy days" (dies feriales), dedicated to God alone, where no official or juridical business could be conducted, and "law days" (dies juridicos) when cases could be judged, writs returned, lawsuits heard, etc.

Traditionally, the English law days were grouped and divided into four "law terms", that is periods when the higher English law courts would be open (all other days were deemed "holy days" or reserved for agriculture). Each law term lasted about three weeks, and was named after the major religious feast which immediately preceded it. The four law terms of England were referred to as the "Hilary term" (Jan-Feb), "Easter term" (Apr-May), "Trinity term" (Jun-Jul) and "Michaelmas term" (Oct-Nov).

The law terms were primarily established for the Court of Common Pleas, which was separated from the king's court in 1190s and sat in Westminster since 1234. The establishment of a fixed time and place for this court was one of the major promises of the Magna Carta of 1215. The terms were also adopted by the King's Bench once it also became sedentary. They were also followed by the Exchequer of Pleas. The Court of Chancery, by contrast, was "always open". In practice, the law terms were a little flexible, depending on the court or volume of business, and sometimes stretched past the prescribed dates, with breaks if a major religious festival landed within the law term.

Law term dates were traditionally expressed in feast citation. The law terms were enshrined in the Book of Commmon Prayer of 1559. The Law Terms Act 1830 (11 Geo. 4. & 1 Will. 4. c. 70) fixed more exact calendar dates for the law terms (with only slight adjustments if they landed on a Sunday).

The law terms were abolished in the Supreme Court of Judicature Act 1873 (36 & 37 Vict. c. 66), but the old statutory terms continued to be used as a measure of time for legal awards. By force of tradition, the same term labels are still applied today for sittings of the High Court of Justice and the Court of Appeal for England and Wales, but no longer have the same meaning.

- "Hilary term" (January-February): the Hilary term originally ran from the feast of St. Hilary (13 January) to Septuagesima (ninth Sunday before Easter, usually early February, thereby breaking up before Lent). In Tudor times, the Hilary law term ran specifically from the octave of St. Hilary (23 January) to 12 February (if it landed on Sunday, then the next day). In the Law Terms Act 1830 (11 Geo. 4. & 1 Will. 4. c. 70), the Hilary law term was fixed from 11 January to 30 January. Today the Hilary sitting runs from 11 January to the Wednesday before Easter Sunday (March/April).
- "Easter term" (April-May): traditionally ran from octave of Easter (week after Easter Sunday) to Ascension Day (usually May). In Tudor times, it was settled at 17 days after Easter Sunday to the Monday after Ascension day. The Law Terms Act 1830 fixed it to begin on 15 April and end 8 May (with adjustments if the dates landed too close to Easter Sunday). Today, the Easter sitting runs from second Tuesday after Easter to Friday before Whitsunday (usually late May).
- "Trinity term" (June-July): ran from octave of Whitsunday (usually early Jun) to mid-July (break for harvest). Early on, it began in the octave of Trinity Sunday, but full term only began from the first Wednesday after Corpus Christi day (thus a week-and-half after Trinity Sunday). The Trinity Term Act 1540 (32 Hen. 8. c. 21) brought that up by a week, and made it officially begin the first Monday after Trinity Sunday and the full term from Friday after Corpus Christi (thus the first Friday after Trinity) and to end Wednesday a fortnight after (other sources set ending exactly on 28 June). Today, the Trinity sitting runs from second Tuesday after Whitsunday to 31 July.
- "Michaelmas term" (October-December): originally the full Michaelmas term ran from the fourth day of the octave of the feast of St. Michael (9 October) to 28 November (before Advent Sunday). An act of 1641, the Michaelmas Term Act 1640 (16 Cha. 1. c. 6), pushed the begin date forward to 23 October (fourth day of three weeks of St. Michael). A 1751 act (24 Geo. 2. c. 48) pushed it further forward, so the Michaelmas law term began on the Morrow of All Souls' Day (3 November) and the full term on fourth day of Morrow (6 November). The Law Terms Act 1830 fixed the term as beginning on 2 November and ending on 25 November. Today, the Michaelmas sitting runs from 1 October to 21 December.

Given the legal year start date (25 March), the Book of Common Prayer lists the Easter law term as the first. But as historically the annual accounts of the Exchequer ended precisely on Michaelmas Day (29 September), the Michaelmas law term is sometimes referred to as the first law term of the year.

These law terms apply only to English law jurisdiction (England and Wales). (Scotland has different law terms entirely).

Some old English universities (e.g. Oxford) use the same labels for their academic terms, but their dates should not be confused with law term dates.

==== Return days ====
Royal proclamation of 1630 suspending the return days of Michaelmas term, to avoid traveling litigants spreading the bubonic plague.

Court records, proceedings, judicial decisions and legal documents were recorded on "plea rolls" by the clerks of each court, organized by regnal year and law term. The higher English courts liked to maintain the legal fiction that the king's justice is swift, and that every case is heard and judged in one day. As a result, cases that took several days were fudged in the records, and dating often did not get more precise than simply recording the law term and regnal year. In old records, the most granular dating gets is by "return day".

Each law term had several "return days" (also known as "essoin days"), typically a week apart. These are specific days during the law term set aside for litigant parties and sheriffs to appear in court and return writs, or for their representatives to file an essoin (notice of non-appearance). Return days are dated by feast citation and regnal year..:

- Hilary term had four return days: Octabis Hilarii (often abbreviated "Oct Hill.", Jan 20), Quindena Hilarii ("XV. Hill.", Jan 27), Crastino Purificationis Beatae Mariae Virginis ("Crō Pur.", Morrow of Candlemas, Feb 3), Octabis Purificationis ("Oct Pur.", Feb 9).
- Easter term had five return days: Quindena Paschae ("XV. Pas.", 15 days after Easter Sunday), Tres Paschae ("Tr Pas.", three weeks after Easter), Mense Paschae ("m Pas.", month after Easter), Quinque Paschae ("Q(que) Pas.", five weeks after Easter), Crastino Ascentionis ("Crō Asc.", Morrow of Ascension, six weeks after Easter).
- Trinity term had four return days: Crastino Trinitatis ("Crō Trin.", Monday after Trinity Sunday), Octabis Trinitatis ("Oct Trin.", Sunday after Octave of Trinity, but proceedings start Wednesday following), Quindena Trinitatis ("XV. Trin.", two weeks after Trinity), Tres Trinitatis ("Tres Trin.", three weeks after Trinity).
- Michaelmas term had eight return days: Octabis Michis or Octabis Sancti Michaelis ("Oct. Mich.", Oct 6), Quindena Michaelis ("XV. Mich." Oct 13), Tres Michaelis ("Tr Mich.", Oct 20), Mense Michaelis ("m Mich.", Oct 27), Crastino Animarum ("Crō Aiā{rum}.", Morrow of All Souls, Nov 3), Crastino Martini ("Crō mt.", Morrow of Martinmas, Nov 12), Octabis Martini ("Oct mt.", Nov 18), Quindena Martini ("XV. mt.", Nov 25). Later Michaelmas term reduced to six return days in 1641 and four return days in 1751.

These feast-based return days were suppressed in the Law Terms Act 1830 (11 Geo. 4. & 1 Will. 4. c. 70), and replaced by four uniform return days across all law terms: the fourth day before the start of the term, and the fifth, fifteenth, and nineteenth days of the term. The Uniformity of Process Act 1832 (2 & 3 Will. 4. c. 39) began to phase out return days by allowing most writs to be returnable immediately on execution. Return days were finally abolished altogether in the Judicature acts of 1873-75.

=== Exchequer citation ===
Regnal years were also used for the records at the Exchequer since the earliest days (before 1130). However, the royal fiscal accounts were calculated for one year, always starting on the Morrow of Michaelmas Day (day after feast of St. Michael) (30 September) and ending on Michaelmas Day (29 September). The timing of the "exchequer year" did not vary with the reign. Nonetheless, exchequer years were also referenced by royal names and numbers. Citations of Exchequer documents can be tricky as the relationship between the labels used by the Exchequer and the regnal year proper used by the Chancery is unstable.

Exchequer fiscal accounts were reckoned retrospectively (from the end of the exchequer year backwards to its beginning). So for the first two centuries, the Pipe Rolls and memoranda of the Exchequer were assigned the label of the regnal year on which the final day (29 September) fell. This means that the royal names and numbers assigned to exchequer years overlap and often conflict with the regnal years. e.g. Henry II's 35th regnal year ended with his death on 6 July 1189, but the exchequer year which began on 30 September 1188 continues until 29 September 1189, which lands in the first regnal year of his successor Richard I. Thus the entire exchequer year (1188–89) is retrospectively labelled and referenced as "1 Richard I". Future receipts from, say, December 1189, are added to "2 Richard I" in exchequer year (1189-90), but are actually received during "1 Richard I" in regnal year.

The labeling rule changed in 1307. Edward I's 35th regnal year ended with his death on 2 July 1307, and if the old rule had been followed then the exchequer year which began on 30 September 1306 and continued until 29 September 1307 should have been "1 Edward II", the first regnal year of his successor Edward II. But the rule now changed so that the regnal year that formed the majority of the retrospective year ending on Michaelmas Day should be the label for the exchequer year. So the exchequer year of (1306-07) is actually labelled "35 Edward I", while the exchequer year of 1307-08 is "1 Edward II". This new rule brought the exchequer year more closely in alignment with the regnal year (but still overlaps regnal years).

The rule was changed back again in 1483. After the brief reign of King Edward V, which ended with his deposition on 25 June 1483, the final day of the exchequer year (29 September 1483) landed in the regnal year of his usurper Richard III. The exchequer year of 1482-83 was labelled "1 Richard III". So it seems the prior rule (label by final day) was reinstated. Yet two years later, the rule reverses again: Richard III died on 22 August 1485, and the final day (29 September 1485) landed in first regnal year of the Tudor king Henry VII, yet the 1484-85 exchequer year is labelled "3 Richard III" (label by majority).

The labeling rule changes again in 1548. The Exchequer year that began on 30 September 1547 and ended on 29 September 1548 is given the label "1 Edward VI". King Edward VI first regnal year started 28 January 1547 and ended 28 January 1548. That means that the first regnal year of Edward VI only overlaps with the first four months of his first exchequer year - clearly not the majority of the 1547-58 exchequer year. So the rule now seems to be for exchequer years to be labeled by the regnal year at the start of the exchequer year (30 September), rather than the final day or the majority. This first day rule continues through subsequent years and reigns down to 1832. The difference between exchequer years and regnal years can sometimes be quite dramatic, e.g. Elizabeth I's regnal year (starting 17 November) only overlaps with the first two months of the corresponding exchequer year bearing the same label. George III's regnal year (starting 25 October) only overlaps for the first month of the corresponding exchequer year, i.e. George III's first exchequer year begins 30 September 1761, but his first regnal year "1 George III" ends less than a month later (25 October 1761), yet the whole exchequer year (September 1761 to September 1762) is referenced as "1 George III" in the pipe roll, despite 11 months of it being in regnal year 2 George III.

The varying rules for labelling exchequer years make it sometimes tricky for historical researchers. Adding to the confusion, issue rolls and receipt rolls used by the Exchequer, which take Michaelmas Day and Easter Day as endpoints, nonetheless employ the chancery's regnal year calendar in labelling rather than the exchequer year (happily, their entries also include weekdays and month, making it easier to pin down and sort dating conflicts).

==== Exchequer calendar table ====
The following table shows the degree of coincidence between Exchequer year and Regnal year. Exchequer labels can be found in pipe rolls (continuous from 1155 to 1832) and other Exchequer memoranda. Exchequer years always end 29 September, but Regnal years have varying end dates. The table indicates the number of months of the Exchequer year that overlaps with the same label in Regnal year.

Exchequer year	Pipe roll	Exchequer label	Regnal year start date (of same label)	Degree of coincidence	Labeling formula
1129-30	(year ending 29 Sep 1130)	31 Henry I	5 Aug 1130	last 2 months	(first extant pipe roll) Final day rule begins
1155-56	(year ending 29 Sep 1156)	2 Henry II	19 Dec 1155	last 9 months	(1154-55 pipe roll of 1 Henry II missing, pipe rolls continuous from 1155 onwards)
1188-89	(year ending 29 Sep 1189)	1 Richard I	3 Sep 1189	last 1 month	
1189-99	(year ending 29 Sep 1199)	1 John	28 May 1199	last 4 months	
1217-18	(year ending 29 Sep 1218)	2 Henry III	28 Oct 1217	last 11 months	(1216-17 pipe roll of 1 Henry III missing)
1272-73	(year ending 29 Sep 1273)	1 Edward I	20 Nov 1272	last 10 months	
1307-08	(year ending 29 Sep 1308)	1 Edward II	8 July 1307	first 10 months	Majority rule begins
1326-27	(year ending 29 Sep 1327)	1 Edward III	24 Jan 1327	last 8 months	
1377-78	(year ending 29 Sep 1378)	1 Richard II	21 Jun 1377	first 9 months	
1399-1400	(year ending 29 Sep 1400)	1 Henry IV	30 Sep 1399	all 12 months	
1412-13	(year ending 29 Sep 1413)	1 Henry V	21 Mar 1413	last 6 months	
1422-23	(year ending 29 Sep 1423)	1 Henry VI	1 Sep 1422	first 11 months	
1460-61	(year ending 29 Sep 1461)	1 Edward IV	4 Mar 1461	last 7 months	
1482-83	(year ending 29 Sep 1483)	1 Richard III	26 Jun 1483	last 3 months	Final day rule again (pipe roll of 1 Richard III contains 1 Edward V)
1485-86	(year ending 29 Sep 1486)	1 Henry VII	22 Aug 1485	first 11 months	Majority rule again
1509-10	(year ending 29 Sep 1510)	1 Henry VIII	22 Apr 1509	first 7 months	
1547-48	(year ending 29 Sep 1548)	1 Edward VI	28 Jan 1547	first 4 months	Start day rule begins
1553-54	(year ending 29 Sep 1554)	1 Mary	6 July 1553	first 9 months	
1554-55	(year ending 29 Sep 1555)	1 & 2 Philip and Mary	25 July 1554	first 10 months	
1559-60	(year ending 29 Sep 1560)	1 Elizabeth I	17 Nov 1558	first 2 months	
1603-04	(year ending 29 Sep 1604)	1 James I	24 Mar 1603	first 6 months	
1625-26	(year ending 29 Sep 1626)	1 Charles I	27 Mar 1625	first 6 months	
1659-60	(year ending 29 Sep 1660)	11 Charles II	30 Jan 1659	first 4 months	(first pipe roll of Charles II)
1685-86	(year ending 29 Sep 1686)	1 James II	6 Feb 1685	first 4 months	
1689-90	(year ending 29 Sep 1690)	1 William and Mary	13 Feb 1689	first 4 months	
1695-96	(year ending 29 Sep 1696)	7 William III	28 Dec 1694	first 3 months	
1702-03	(year ending 29 Sep 1703)	1 Anne	8 Mar 1702	first 5 months	
1714-15	(year ending 29 Sep 1715)	1 George I	1 Aug 1714	first 10 months	
1727-28	(year ending 29 Sep 1728)	1 George II	11 Jun 1727	first 9 months	
1761-62	(year ending 29 Sep 1762)	1 George III	25 Oct 1760	first 1 month	
1820-21	(year ending 29 Sep 1821)	1 George IV	29 Jan 1820	first 4 months	
1830-31	(year ending 29 Sep 1831)	1 William IV	26 June 1830	first 9 months	
1831-32	(year ending 29 Sep 1832)	2 William IV	26 June 1831	first 9 months	(last full pipe roll, last exchequer year)

=== Parliamentary citation ===
The best-known application of the regnal calendar is in the citation of English (and later UK) legislation. Every act of Parliament is identified and cited by regnal year and chapter number (e.g. "4 Anne c.12").

Statute laws are cited not by parliament, but rather by parliamentary session. A parliament usually has multiple sessions. An "adjournment" interrupts a session, a "prorogation" ends a session, and a "dissolution" ends a parliament. A parliamentary session is labelled by the regnal year (Anno regni) in which that session sat, from its opening up until its prorogation. An act of parliament is cited as a "chapter" (capitulum) associated with that parliamentary session .

==== English law jurisdiction ====
The Parliament of England has passed statutes from 1235 to 1707, of which a small number are still in force in English law jurisdiction (England and Wales). A parliamentary statute is permanent and remains in force until explicitly repealed (although many statutes were passed with in-built expiration dates).

The Parliament of England was converted into the Parliament of Great Britain in 1707 (with the union of Scotland) and the Parliament of the United Kingdom in 1801 (with the union with Ireland). While politically unified, they were not legally unified. Continued legal separation for Scotland was guaranteed in Article 19 of the 1707 Treaty of Union, and a similar guarantee was made for Ireland in the Act of Union 1800. As a result, the United Kingdom retains three distinct and separate legal systems (English law, Scots law and Northern Ireland law) and three separate legal jurisdictions (England and Wales, Scotland, Northern Ireland). Laws passed by the UK parliament in Westminster have to note which of the three legal jurisdictions (or all) they apply to. The regnal year method of legal citation covered in this article pertains strictly to English law jurisdiction, and does not necessarily apply to other jurisdictions.

==== Parliament rolls ====
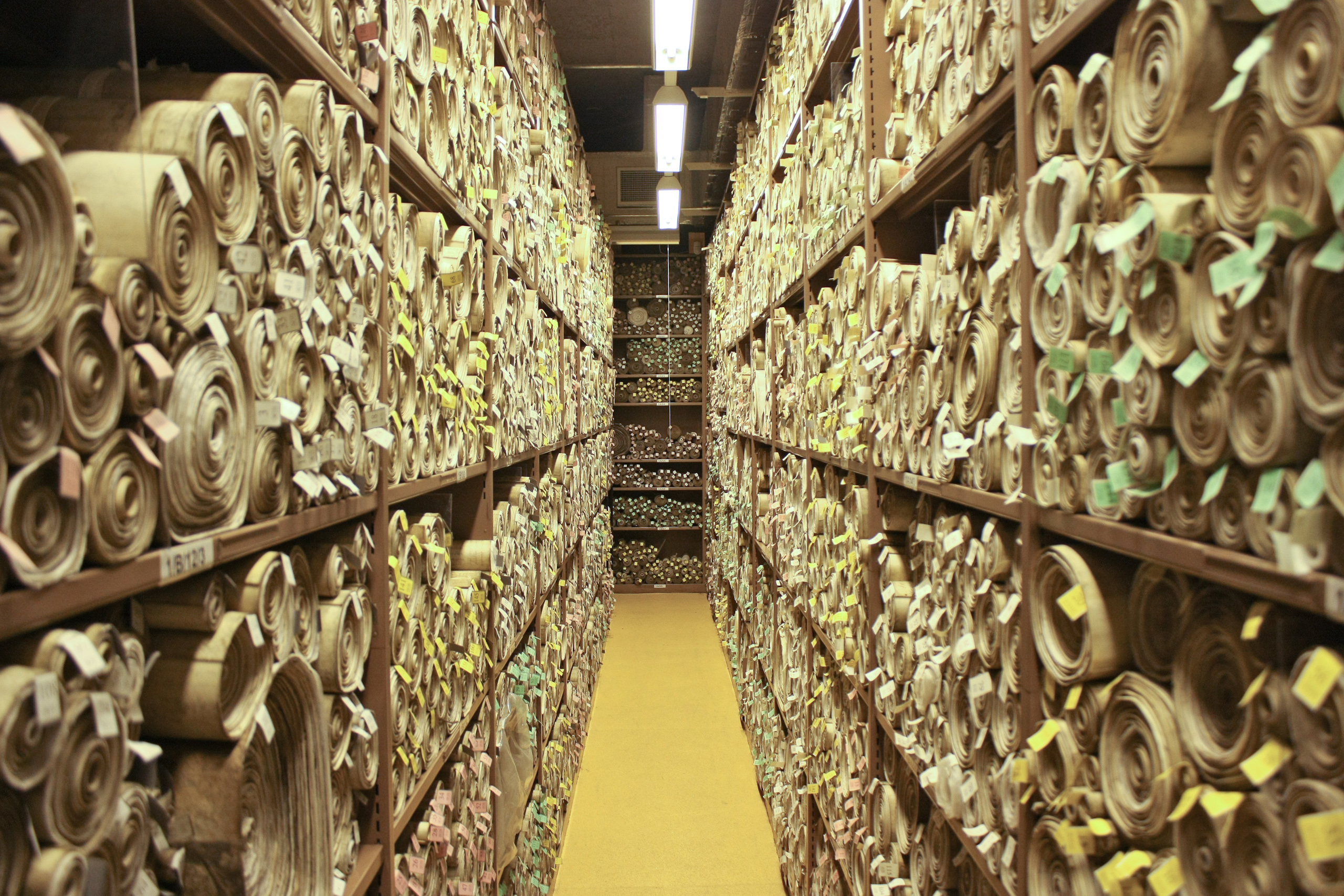
Rolls in the Parliamentary Archives at the Palace of Westminster

Since Medieval times, laws passed by Parliament were inscribed on statute rolls (until 1483) and thereafter on Parliament Rolls ("Rotuli Parliamentorum") (until 1850). A roll was literally a long continuous scroll of vellum parchment, upon which the acts ("chapters") of a parliamentary session, passed and assented, were written down. A new roll was started at the beginning of a parliamentary session, and labelled by the regnal year in which that session sat. The rolls were stored in various scattered locations around Westminster and London, up until the establishment of the Public Record Office in 1838.

As the volume of legislation produced in a parliamentary session increased rapidly from the 18th Century onwards, the rolls of parliamentary sessions soon became unwieldingly large. Nonetheless physical enrollment of parliamentary acts on long parchment rolls continued until 1850, and was only discontinued during the reign of Queen Victoria. They were thereafter written on parchment codices (booklets), but continued to be cited in the same format (by regnal year and chapter).

==== Public acts ====
In English tradition, a parliamentary session passes only one "statute", albeit various "chapters" for each act. The parliamentary session is labelled by the regnal year in which that session sat up until its prorogation. Every public act passed by that session (and given royal assent) is assigned a chapter number (c. 1, c. 2, c. 3, etc.). So the legal citation of a law or public act involves citing the regnal year and chapter, e.g. a public law will be cited as "15 Charles II c.4" in full form, or "15 Cha. 2. c. 4" in abbreviated form, meaning "the fourth chapter of the statute passed by the parliamentary session that sat in the 15th year of the reign of Charles II".

Historically, the ordering of chapter numbers do not necessarily reflect the order of passage or assent of acts, but rather the order of enrollment. As an act was inscribed on the parliament roll as a bill, usually when it came out of committee stage (before the third reading), it is not uncommon for acts with later chapter numbers to have been passed before earlier chapters.

==== Private acts ====
Parliaments can also pass "private acts" (acts affecting only a specific individual or group). These are also given chapter numbers, but kept on a separate list since 1539 and not always printed. Nonetheless, they are cited the same way (by regnal year and chapter number). This may sometimes cause confusion as a private act can have the same session and chapter number as an entirely different public act. To differentiate, some writers use Roman numerals for private acts (c. i, c. ii, c. iii, etc.) and reserve Arabic numerals (c. 1, c. 2, c. 3, etc.) for public acts. But this is not a universal convention. The current recommended convention for citation is to reserve Arabic numerals for public general acts, Roman numerals for local acts, and italicized Arabic numerals for personal acts.. This is not always easy to differentiate in print or not followed in older sources. When citing a private act, it is advisable to clearly label it "private" to differentiate it from the public act. The default assumption as that the citation "15 Cha. 2. c. 4" refers to a public act, unless otherwise noted.

==== Overlapping session ====
If a single parliamentary session overlaps the regnal year start date, it is given a double-label, e.g. Charles II's regnal year begins 30 January, so the parliamentary session that ran from October 1670 to April 1671 is labelled "22 & 23 Charles II" in full form or "22 & 23 Cha. 2" in abbreviated form (the session that sat from the 22nd to the 23rd year of Charles II's reign).

If a monarch dies in the middle of a session, the parliamentary session label will end up with two different monarch names, e.g. George IV died in June 1830, in the course of a parliamentary session that began in February and ran until late July 1830, under his successor William IV, as a result the session's label is "11 Geo. 4 & 1 Will. 4" (the session that sat from the 11th year of George IV to the first year of William IV).

==== Multiple sessions ====
If there are two parliamentary sessions within the same regnal year, they are differentiated by a "statute" or "session" suffix (e.g. 13 Cha. 2 St. 1 is a different session than 13 Cha. 2 St. 2).

It does not matter if the second session is a new session of a continuing parliament or if it is the first session of a new parliament, a suffix is added only if it lands within the same regnal year. Some sessions were prorogued without passing an act, and thus have no legal statute label at all and are not counted in the session numbering.

In the event of two sessions within the same regnal year, the chapter numbering would reset and the sessions are differentiated by the suffixes: "statute 1" & "statute 2" (abbreviated "stat. 1" and "stat. 2" or "st. 1" and "st. 2") or alternatively "session 1" and "session 2" (abbreviated "sess. 1" and "sess. 2" or "s. 1" and "s. 2").

For example, Mary I, whose regnal start date is on 6 July 1553, had three parliamentary sessions within her first regnal year, customarily differentiated by "sess." suffix — two sessions within her first parliament (October to December, 1553), and a third session in her second parliament (April to May, 1554). The Treason Act 1553 is cited "1 Mar. Sess. 1. c. 1" as it was passed in the first session of her first parliament, while Legitimacy of the Queen, etc. Act 1553 is cited "1 Mar. Sess. 2 c.1" as it was passed in the second session of her first parliament and finally Queen Regent's Prerogative Act 1554 is cited as "1 Mar. Sess. 3 c.1" as it was passed in the first session of her second parliament. All three are within her first regnal year (6 July 1553 to 5 July 1554).

By contrast, King George I had two sessions in two different parliaments in his first regnal year which are usually differentiated by "stat." suffix. The Civil List Act 1714 is cited as "1 Geo. 1. St. 1 c.1" as it was passed in the last session of his first parliament (5 Aug to 25 Aug, 1714), while Riot Act is cited as "1 Geo. 1. St. 2 c. 5", as it was passed in the first session of his second parliament (17 Mar to 26 Jun, 1715). Both were within the first regnal year of George I (1 Aug 1714 to July 31, 1715).

Whether "sess." or "stat." is applied depends on the compilation used. Compilation publishers usually applied "sess." if the original parliament roll contained the explicit phrase "sessio prima", "sessio secunda", etc. (in Latin) at the head of the roll, but if not explicit, then "stat." was used. In legal citation, it usually does not matter which suffix is used if there is no risk of confusion.

The Long Parliament presents an anomaly, since it was convened by the King Charles I of England on 3 November 1640 and went through various incarnations until it was finally dissolved on 16 March 1660. Since its first session of 1640 was never prorogued by royal command, its first session officially never ended, and all its surviving acts are labelled "16 Cha. 1" regardless of year of passage.

==== Retrospective dates ====
Historically, the act of giving royal assent to a statute — and all the acts on it — only happened on the last day of the parliamentary session. This was because the action of giving royal assent also ended the session. This practice was ended in July 1625, when bubonic plague caused Parliament to withdraw to Oxford. The Parliament Act 1625 (1 Cha. 1. c. 7) made the necessary change in law.

Even after this change, the date of assent for a specific act was not noted in the statute text. Historians trying to affix a conventional calendar date to a specific act have to search in the Journals of the House of Commons. This was changed by the Acts of Parliament (Commencement) Act 1793 (33 Geo. 3. c. 13) which required the Clerk of Parliament to explicitly record the date of passage and assent. So it is only from 1794 onwards that statutes explicitly include the calendar date of an act.

It was also the case that an act was assumed to go into legal effect not on the final day of the session (the date of royal assent), but rather on the first day of the session in which it was passed. That means that acts of Parliament applied retrospectively to the start of the session, several weeks or months before they were actually passed and assented. To avoid injustices, it was common for legislation to explicitly specify in the text the date when a new law, regulation, or tax would begin to apply. If a commencement date was not specified, magistrates could retroactively prosecute or impose penalties on actions that were perfectly legal at the time. This often provoked indignation and outrage. William Blackstone, in his influential 1765 Commentaries, railed against retrospective laws, insisting laws should apply only to the future. Remembering the English experience, Americans were careful to include a categorical prohibition on ex post facto laws in the US Constitution (Art.1, Sec.9) in 1789. The Acts of Parliament (Commencement) Act 1793 finally remedied this, and thereafter laws only applied from the date of assent recorded by the clerk in the statute. This was reinforced in the Interpretation Act 1978.

The pre-1794 custom of retrospective dating may cause confusion in the "short titles" for statutes which happen to have a year in the title. Parliamentary sessions often started in Autumn and continued into Spring. So an act that was passed in, say, the Spring of 1664 might nonetheless be given the year "1663" in its short title - as that is when the session began, and thus when the act came into retrospective force. Thus historians often have to tangle with the awkwardness of citing an "act of 1663" responding to events occurring in 1664. Careful writers will take care to mention the actual year of passage in the historical narrative if there is risk of confusion with the year in the short title. Careless writers might not make notice of it and let readers assume the short title year is the actual year of passage, e.g. the Bubble Act (6 Geo. 1. c. 18) passed in June 1720 is sometimes mistakenly cited in history books as being passed in 1719 (long before the South Sea Bubble began) simply because its legal short title is the "Royal Exchange and London Assurance Corporation Act 1719" (the session started in November 1719).

==== Statute compilations ====
Citation labels are not always consistent, and depends on the statute compilation used.

As statute law was inscribed on large rolls, often difficult to access and cumbersome to consult, legal professionals usually relied on copies of individual acts sent by the chancery to local sheriffs around the kingdom for promulgation or official versions printed during sessions by the king's printer. Sessional printing of statutes began in 1484 (1 Richard III), shortly after the arrival of the printing press in England, but these printings were usually small and copies scarce. They were reprinted in newspapers and later on statute compilations put out by private printers. However, only sessional printings were regarded as official and admissible in English courts of law.

For historical researchers, the most prominent compilations of statutes are the popular Statutes at Large (ed. Owen Ruffhead, 1762–65) and the similarly-named contemporary rival Statutes at Large (ed. Danby Pickering 1762–66) The labels and numbering in Ruffhead and Pickering compilations are identical, and so interchangeable. But their regnal year titles or chapters sometimes differ considerably from the official The Statutes of the Realm (ed. Record Commission, 1810-22), which covers acts up to 1714. So when citing old statutes before 1714 it is sometimes necessary to check for variances and make note of which compilation is being used.

For example, the Act of Union passed in the parliamentary session begun in December 1706 is cited as "5 Ann c.8" in Statutes at Large whereas it is "6 Ann. c. 11" in Statutes of Realm.

The fourth major historical compilation entering the fray was the Statutes at Large of England and Great Britain (ed. T. E. Tomlins and John Raithby, 1811, covering acts before 1800), which is continued as the Statutes of the United Kingdom and Ireland (acts from 1801 until 1869).

All these statute compilations (except for the Statutes of the Realm) are unofficial, put out by private editors and printers. While well-regarded and treated as authoritative by the legal profession, there was no guarantee they were complete, or that their wording was correct and the law was as stated.

In 1796, a parliamentary select committee, under the chairmanship of Charles Abbott, reviewed the private statute compilations, and their report concluded that they were inadequate – some statutes were missing entirely, others had missing clauses, some had been repealed, etc. They recommended the establishment of a Record Commission to oversee the publication of an "authentic and entire record" from the English statute rolls. The official The Statutes of the Realm (1810–22) was the result of this effort. However it only went as far as 1714. For post-1714 acts, legal professionals still had to rely on the Statutes at Large compilations put out by private publishers until the 1860s.

A Statute Law Commission was established in 1854 under lord chancellor Robert Rolfe, 1st Baron Cranworth to produce a complete record of the statutes. During this process, they composed parliamentary bills to formally repeal and clear statutes that are no longer in force, and consolidate scattered acts into new comprehensive bills (see Statute law revision). A Statute Law Committee was appointed in 1868 under the Lord Chancellor Hugh Cairns, 1st Earl Cairns, to superintend the printed publication of the compilation. The committee published a series of volumes known as The Statutes Revised from 1870 to 1885, compiling existing statute law down to 1878, and regarded as official. After a series of additional acts consolidating statutes, a second revised edition was put out in 1888, removing the ones that were repealed. The Statutes Second Revised edition compiles statutes from 1235 down to 1920. The official Statutes Revised collections follow the Statutes of the Realm labels until 1714, and the Statutes at Large labels thereafter.

== See also ==
- Citation of United Kingdom legislation
- Acts of Parliament Numbering and Citation Act 1962
- List of English monarchs
- List of British monarchs
