= List of English monarchs =

Monarchy of England
- Royal coat of arms

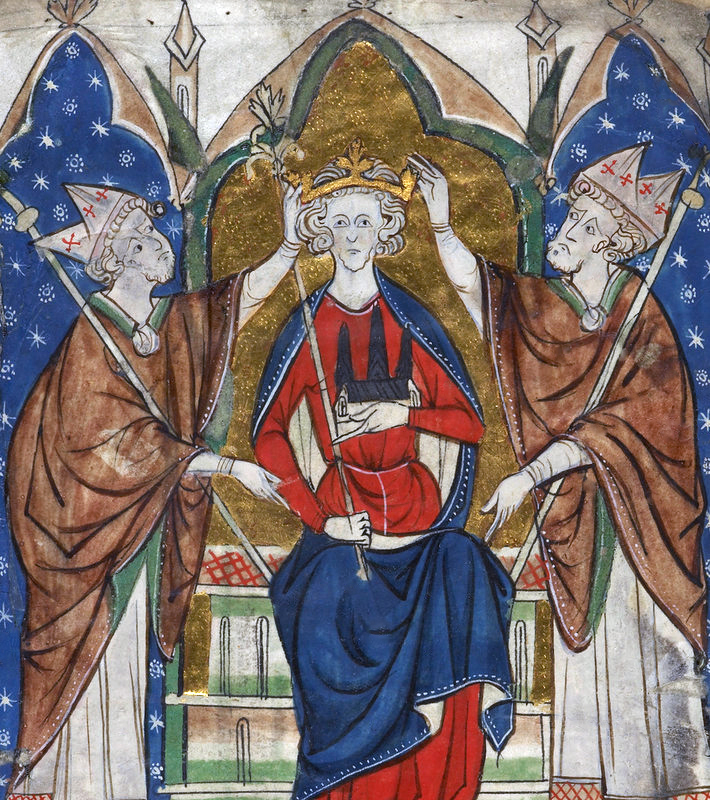
- Longest reigning Henry III; 28 October 1216 – 16 November 1272

Details
- First monarch: Alfred the Great
- Last monarch: Anne
- Formed: c. 886 (late 9th century)
- Abolished: 1 May 1707
- Residence: Court of St James's

Great Britain during the Early Middle Ages. Listed in red are The Heptarchy, the collective name given to the seven main Anglo-Saxon petty kingdoms located in the southeastern two-thirds of the island that were unified to form the Kingdom of England.

This list of kings and reigning queens of the Kingdom of England begins with Alfred the Great, who initially ruled Wessex, one of the seven Anglo-Saxon kingdoms which later made up modern England. Alfred styled himself king of the Anglo-Saxons from about 886, and while he was not the first king to claim to rule all of the English, his rule represents the start of the first unbroken line of kings to rule the whole of England, the House of Wessex.

Arguments are made for a few different kings thought to have controlled enough Anglo-Saxon kingdoms to be deemed the first king of England. For example, Offa of Mercia and Egbert of Wessex are sometimes described as kings of England by popular writers, but it is no longer the majority view of historians that their wide dominions were part of a process leading to a unified England. The historian Simon Keynes states, for example, "Offa was driven by a lust for power, not a vision of English unity; and what he left was a reputation, not a legacy." That refers to a period in the late 8th century, when Offa achieved a dominance over many of the kingdoms of southern England, but it did not survive his death in 796. Likewise, in 829 Egbert of Wessex conquered Mercia, but he soon lost control of it.

It was not until the late 9th century that one kingdom, Wessex, had become the dominant Anglo-Saxon kingdom. Its king, Alfred the Great, was the overlord of western Mercia and used the title King of the Angles and Saxons though he never ruled eastern and northern England, which was then known as the Danelaw and had been conquered by the Danes, from southern Scandinavia. Alfred's son Edward the Elder conquered the eastern Danelaw. Edward's son Æthelstan became the first king to rule the whole of England when he conquered Northumbria in 927. Æthelstan is regarded by some modern historians as the first true king of England. The title "King of the English" or Rex Anglorum in Latin, was first used to describe Æthelstan in one of his charters in 928. The standard title for monarchs from Æthelstan until John was "King of the English". In 1016, Cnut the Great, a Dane, was the first to call himself "King of England". In the Norman period, "King of the English" remained standard, with occasional use of "King of England" or Rex Anglie. From John's reign onwards, all other titles were eschewed in favour of "King" or "Queen of England".

The Principality of Wales was incorporated into the Kingdom of England under the Statute of Rhuddlan in 1284, and in 1301, King Edward I invested his eldest son, the future King Edward II, as Prince of Wales. Since that time, the eldest sons of all English monarchs, except for King Edward III, (Note: Edward III became king at age 14.) have borne this title.

After the death of Queen Elizabeth I in 1603, her cousin King James VI of Scotland inherited the English crown as James I of England, joining the crowns of England and Scotland in personal union. By royal proclamation, James styled himself "King of Great Britain", but no such kingdom was created until 1707, when England and Scotland united during the reign of Queen Anne to form the new Kingdom of Great Britain, with a single British parliament sitting at Westminster. That marked the end of the Kingdom of England as a sovereign state.

== House of Wessex (886–1013) ==
Name Reign	Portrait	Birth	Marriage(s) Issue	Death	Succession
Alfred; Alfred the Great (King of Wessex from 871) c. 886 – 26 October 899 (13 years)		849 Son of Æthelwulf of Wessex and Osburh	Ealhswith of Gainsborough; 868; 5 children	26 October 899; Aged about 50	Son of Æthelwulf of Wessex Treaty of Wedmore
Edward the Elder; 26 October 899 – 17 July 924 (24 years, 266 days)		c. 874 Son of Alfred and Ealhswith	(1) Ecgwynn c. 893; 2 children (2) Ælfflæd c. 900; 8 children (3) Eadgifu of Kent c. 919; 4 children	17 July 924; Aged about 50	Son of Alfred

=== Disputed claimant ===
There is some evidence that Ælfweard of Wessex may have been king in 924, between his father Edward the Elder and his half-brother Æthelstan, although he was not crowned. A 12th-century list of kings gives him a reign length of four weeks, though one manuscript of the Anglo-Saxon Chronicle says he died only 16 days after his father. However, the claim that he ruled is not accepted by all historians. Also, it is unclear whether—if Ælfweard was declared king—it was over the whole kingdom or of Wessex only. One interpretation of the ambiguous evidence is that when Edward died, Ælfweard was declared king in Wessex and Æthelstan in Mercia.

Name Reign	Portrait	Birth	Marriage Issue	Death	Succession
Ælfweard c. 17 July 924 – 2 August 924 (16 days)		c. 901 Son of Edward the Elder and Ælfflæd	Unmarried? No children	2 August 924; Aged about 23 (Note: Ælfweard was buried at Winchester.)	Son of Edward the Elder

=== Undisputed ===
Name Reign	Portrait	Birth	Marriage(s) Issue	Death	Succession
Æthelstan; 924; King of the Anglo-Saxons (924–927) – King of the English (927–939) 27 October 939 (14–15 years)	King Athelstan from All Souls College Chapel	894 Son of Edward the Elder and Ecgwynn	Unmarried	27 October 939; Aged about 45	Son of Edward the Elder
Edmund I Edmund the Magnificent; 27 October 939 – 26 May 946 (6 years, 212 days)		c. 921 Son of Edward the Elder and Eadgifu of Kent	(1) Ælfgifu of Shaftesbury; 2 sons (2) Æthelflæd of Damerham; 944; No children	26 May 946; Pucklechurch; Killed in a brawl aged about 25	Son of Edward the Elder
Eadred; 26 May 946 – 23 November 955 (9 years, 182 days)		c. 923 Son of Edward the Elder and Eadgifu of Kent	Unmarried	23 November 955; Frome; Aged about 32	Son of Edward the Elder
Eadwig; Eadwig All-Fair; 23 November 955 – 1 October 959 (3 years, 313 days)	Line engraving of Edwy made by an unknown engraver after an unknown artist	c. 940 Son of Edmund I and Ælfgifu of Shaftesbury	Ælfgifu; No verified children	1 October 959; Aged about 19	Son of Edmund I
Edgar the Peaceful; 1 October 959 – 8 July 975 (15 years, 281 days)	King Edgar of England	c. 943; Wessex Son of Edmund I and Ælfgifu of Shaftesbury	(1) Æthelflæd c. 960; 1 son (2) Ælfthryth c. 964; 2 sons	8 July 975; Winchester; Aged 31	Son of Edmund I
Edward the Martyr; 8 July 975 – 18 March 978 (2 years, 254 days)	St. Edward the Martyr	c. 962 Son of Edgar the Peaceful and Æthelflæd	Unmarried	18 March 978; Corfe Castle; Murdered aged about 16	Son of Edgar the Peaceful
(1st reign) (Note: Æthelred was forced to go into exile in mid-1013, following Danish attacks, but was invited back following Sweyn Forkbeard's death in 1014.); Æthelred the Unready; 18 March 978 – 1013 (34–35 years)	Image of Æthelred with an oversize sword from the illuminated manuscript "The Chronicle of Abingdon"	c. 966 Son of Edgar the Peaceful and Ælfthryth	(1) Ælfgifu of York; 991; 9 children (2) Emma of Normandy; 1002; 3 children	23 April 1016; London; Aged about 48	Son of Edgar the Peaceful

== House of Denmark (1013–1014) ==
England came under the control of Sweyn Forkbeard, a Danish king, after an invasion in 1013, during which Æthelred abandoned the throne and went into exile in Normandy.

Name Reign	Portrait	Birth	Marriages	Death	Succession
Sweyn; Sweyn Forkbeard; Autumn/winter 1013 – 3 February 1014	Sweyn Forkbeard, from an architectural element in the Swansea Guildhall, Swansea, Wales	17 April 963; Denmark Son of Harald Bluetooth and either Tove or Gunhild	(1) Gunhild of Wenden c. 990; 7 children (2) Sigrid the Haughty c. 1000; 1 daughter	3 February 1014; Gainsborough; Aged 50	Right of conquest (great-grandson of a king of Northumbria)

== House of Wessex (restored, first time) (1014–1016) ==
Following the death of Sweyn Forkbeard, Æthelred the Unready returned from exile and was again proclaimed king. His son succeeded him after being chosen king by the citizens of London and a part of the Witan, despite ongoing Danish efforts to wrest the crown from the West Saxons.

Name Reign	Portrait	Birth	Marriage(s) Issue	Death	Succession
(2nd reign); Æthelred the Unready early 1014 – 23 April 1016	Image of Æthelred II with an oversize sword from the illuminated manuscript "The Chronicle of Abingdon"	c. 966 Son of Edgar the Peaceful and Ælfthryth	(1) Ælfgifu of York; 991; 9 children (2) Emma of Normandy; 1002; 3 children	23 April 1016; London; Aged about 48	Son of Edgar the Peaceful
Edmund Ironside after 23 April 1016 – 30 November 1016	Edmund Ironside	c. 990 Son of Æthelred and Ælfgifu of York	Edith of East Anglia; 2 children	30 November 1016; Glastonbury; Aged 26	Son of Æthelred

== House of Denmark (restored) (1016–1042) ==
Following the decisive Battle of Assandun on 18 October 1016, King Edmund signed a treaty with Cnut (Canute) under which all of England except for Wessex would be controlled by Cnut. Upon Edmund's death just over a month later on 30 November, Cnut ruled the whole kingdom as its sole king for nineteen years.

Name Reign	Portrait	Birth	Marriage(s) Issue	Death	Succession
Cnut; Cnut the Great after 23 Apr 1016 – 12 November 1035		c. 995 Son of Sweyn Forkbeard and Gunhilda of Poland	(1) Ælfgifu of Northampton; 2 sons (2) Emma of Normandy; 1017; 2 children	12 November 1035; Shaftesbury; Aged about 40	Son of Sweyn Treaty of Deerhurst
Harold Harefoot after 12 November 1035 – 17 March 1040 (Note: Harold was only recognised as Regent until 1037, when he was recognised as king.)		c. 1016 Son of Cnut the Great and Ælfgifu of Northampton	Ælfgifu? 1 son?	17 March 1040; Oxford; Aged about 24	Son of Cnut the Great
Harthacnut after 17 March 1040 – 8 June 1042		1018 Son of Cnut the Great and Emma of Normandy	Unmarried	8 June 1042; Lambeth; Aged about 24	Son of Cnut the Great

== House of Wessex (restored, second time) (1042–1066) ==
After Harthacnut, there was a Saxon Restoration in 1042.

Name Reign	Portrait	Arms	Birth	Marriage Issue	Death	Succession
Edward the Confessor; 8 June 1042 – 5 January 1066 (23 years, 212 days)			c. 1003; Islip Son of Æthelred and Emma of Normandy	Edith of Wessex; 23 January 1045; No children	5 January 1066; Westminster Palace; Aged about 63	Son of Æthelred Step-son of Cnut the Great Half-brother of Harthacnut

== House of Godwin (1066) ==
Name Reign	Portrait	Arms	Birth	Marriages	Death	Succession
Harold II; Harold Godwinson; 6 January 1066 – 14 October 1066 (282 days)			c. 1022 Son of Godwin of Wessex and Gytha Thorkelsdóttir	(1) Edith Swannesha; 5 children (2) Ealdgyth c. 1064; 2 sons	14 October 1066; Hastings; Died in the Battle of Hastings aged 44	Named heir by Edward the Confessor Brother-in-law of Edward the Confessor Elected by the Witenagemot

=== Disputed claimant (House of Wessex) ===
After King Harold was killed at the Battle of Hastings, the Witan elected Edgar Ætheling as king, but by then the Normans controlled the country and Edgar never ruled. He submitted to King William the Conqueror.

Name Reign	Portrait	Birth	Marriage Issue	Death	Succession
(Title disputed); Edgar Ætheling; 15 October 1066 – 17 December 1066 (Note: After reigning for approximately 9 weeks, Edgar Atheling submitted to William the Conqueror, who had gained control of the area to the south and immediate west of London.) (64 days)		c. 1051 Son of Edward the Exile and Agatha	No known marriage	1125 or 1126; Aged about 75	Grandson of Edmund Ironside Elected by the Witan

== House of Normandy (1066–1135) ==
In 1066, Edward the Confessor had no direct heir upon his death and several rival claimants to the English throne emerged. Among them were Harold Godwinson (recognised as king by the Witenagemot after the death of Edward the Confessor), Harald Hardrada (King of Norway who claimed to be the rightful heir of Harthacnut) and Duke William II of Normandy (vassal to the King of France, and first cousin once-removed of Edward the Confessor). Harald Hardrada and William both invaded separately in 1066. Godwinson successfully repelled the invasion by Harald Hardrada, but ultimately lost the throne of England in the Norman Conquest of England.

Following the death of Harold Godwinson at the Battle of Hastings on 14 October 1066, the Anglo-Saxon Witenagemot elected as king Edgar Ætheling, the son of Edward the Exile and grandson of Edmund Ironside. The young monarch was unable to resist the invaders and was never crowned. William was crowned King William I of England on Christmas Day 1066, in Westminster Abbey, and is today known as William the Conqueror, William the Bastard or William I. William made permanent the recent removal of the capital from Winchester to London.

Name Reign	Portrait	Arms	Birth	Marriage(s) Issue	Death	Succession
William I William the Conqueror (Note: Sometimes "William the Bastard"); 25 December 1066 – 9 September 1087 (20 years, 259 days)	William the Conqueror depicted at the Brief Abridgement of the Chronicles of England, by Matthew Paris.		c. 1028; Falaise Castle Son of Robert the Magnificent and Herleva	Matilda of Flanders; Normandy; 1053; 9 children	9 September 1087; Rouen; Aged about 59 (Note: William I was buried at the Abbey of Saint-Étienne (French: Abbaye aux Hommes) in France.)	Supposedly named heir in 1052 by Edward the Confessor First cousin once removed of Edward the Confessor Right of conquest
William II; William Rufus; 26 September 1087 (Note: William II was crowned on 26 September 1087.) – 2 August 1100 (12 years, 311 days)	William Rufus depicted in the Stowe Manuscript		c. 1056; Normandy Son of William the Conqueror and Matilda of Flanders	Unmarried	2 August 1100; New Forest; Shot with an arrow aged 44	Son of William I Granted the Kingdom of England over elder brother Robert Curthose (who remained the Duke of Normandy)
Henry I Henry Beauclerc; 5 August 1100 (Note: Henry I was crowned on 5 August 1100.) – 1 December 1135 (35 years, 119 days)	Henry I		September 1068; Selby Son of William the Conqueror and Matilda of Flanders	(1) Matilda of Scotland; Westminster Abbey; 11 November 1100; 2 children (2) Adeliza of Louvain; Windsor Castle; 29 January 1121; No children	1 December 1135; Saint-Denis-en-Lyons; Aged 67 (Note: Henry I was buried at Reading Abbey.)	Son of William I Seizure of the Crown (from Robert Curthose)

Henry I left no legitimate male heirs, his son William Adelin having died in the White Ship disaster of 1120. This ended the direct Norman line of kings in England. Henry named his eldest daughter, Matilda (Countess of Anjou by her second marriage to Geoffrey Plantagenet, Count of Anjou, as well as widow of her first husband, Henry V, Holy Roman Emperor), as his heir.

=== Disputed claimant ===
Matilda was declared heir presumptive by her father, Henry I, after the death of her brother on the White Ship, and acknowledged as such by the barons. Upon Henry I's death, the throne was seized by Matilda's cousin, Stephen of Blois. During the ensuing "Anarchy", Matilda controlled England for a few months in 1141. She was the first woman to do so, but was never crowned and is rarely listed as a monarch of England. (Note: Matilda is not listed as a monarch of England in many genealogies within texts, including Carpenter, David (2003). A Struggle for Mastery. p. 533.; Warren, W.L. (1973). Henry II. Berkeley. p. 176. ISBN 9780520022829.; and Gillingham, John (1984). The Angevin Empire. p. x..)

Name Reign	Portrait	Arms	Birth	Marriages	Death	Succession
Matilda; Empress (Note: Even after the death of her first husband, Henry V, Holy Roman Emperor, Matilda kept the title of "Empress".) Matilda; 7 April 1141 – 1 November 1141 (209 days)	Matilda		7 February 1102; Sutton Courtenay Manor House Daughter of Henry I and Matilda of Scotland	(1) Henry V of the Holy Roman Empire; Mainz; 6 January 1114; No children (2) Geoffrey V of Anjou; Le Mans Cathedral; 22 May 1128; 3 sons	10 September 1167; Rouen; Aged 65	Sole surviving legitimate child of Henry I Seizure of the Crown

== House of Blois (1135–1154) ==
Before naming Matilda as heir, Henry had been in negotiations to name his nephew Stephen of Blois as his heir. When Henry died, Stephen travelled to England, and in a coup d'etat had himself crowned instead of Matilda. The period which followed is known as the Anarchy, as parties supporting each side fought in open warfare both in Britain and in Continental Europe for the better part of two decades.

Name Reign	Portrait	Arms	Birth	Marriage Issue	Death	Succession
Stephen; Stephen of Blois; 22 December 1135 (Note: Stephen was crowned on 22 December 1135.) – 25 October 1154 (18 years, 308 days)	Stephen		c. 1096; Blois Son of Stephen II of Blois and Adela of Normandy	Matilda of Boulogne; Westminster; 1125; 6 children	25 October 1154; Dover Castle; Aged about 58	Grandson of William I Appointment / usurpation

King Stephen appointed his son, Eustace IV, Count of Boulogne as co-King on 6 April 1152, to guarantee succession (as was the French — but not English — custom). Pope Eugene III would not agree to this, and Eustace was not crowned. Eustace died the next year during his father's lifetime and so did not become king in his own right.

== House of Plantagenet (1154–1485) ==
The House of Plantagenet takes its name from Geoffrey Plantagenet, Count of Anjou, husband of Empress Matilda and father of Henry II. The name Plantagenet itself was unknown as a family name per se until Richard of York adopted it as his family name in the 15th century. It has since been retroactively applied to English monarchs from Henry II onward. It is common among modern historians to refer to Henry II and his sons as the "Angevins" because of their vast continental empire and because most Angevin kings before John spent more time in their continental possessions than in England.

=== Angevin kings of England ===
King Stephen came to an agreement with Matilda in November 1153 with the signing of the Treaty of Wallingford, in which Stephen recognised Henry, son of Matilda and her second husband Geoffrey Plantagenet, Count of Anjou, as the designated heir. The royal house descended from Matilda and Geoffrey is widely known by two names, the House of Anjou (after Geoffrey's title as Count of Anjou) or the House of Plantagenet, after his sobriquet. Some historians prefer to group the subsequent kings into two groups, before and after the loss of the bulk of their French possessions, although they are not different royal houses.

The Angevins (from the French term meaning "from Anjou") ruled over the Angevin Empire during the 12th and 13th centuries, an area stretching from the Pyrenees to Ireland. They did not regard England as their primary home until most of their continental domains were lost by King John. The direct, eldest male line from Henry II includes monarchs commonly grouped together as the House of Plantagenet, which was the name given to the dynasty after the loss of most of their continental possessions, while cadet branches of this line became known as the House of Lancaster and the House of York during the Wars of the Roses.

The Angevins formulated England's royal coat of arms, which usually showed other kingdoms held or claimed by them or their successors, although without representation of Ireland for quite some time. Dieu et mon droit was first used as a battle cry by Richard I in 1198 at the Battle of Gisors, when he defeated the forces of Philip II of France. It has generally been used as the motto of English monarchs since being adopted by Edward III.

Name Reign	Portrait	Arms	Birth	Marriage(s) Issue	Death	Succession
Henry II; Henry Curtmantle; 19 December 1154 (Note: Henry II was crowned on 19 December 1154 with his queen, Eleanor of Aquitaine.) – 6 July 1189 (34 years, 200 days)	Henry II	Royal Arms of England (1154–1189)	5 March 1133; Le Mans Son of Empress Matilda and Geoffrey V of Anjou	Eleanor of Aquitaine; Bordeaux Cathedral; 18 May 1152; 8 children	6 July 1189; Chinon; Aged 56 (Note: Henry II was buried at Fontevraud Abbey.)	Grandson of Henry I Treaty of Wallingford Great-great-great-grandson of Edmund Ironside
Henry II named his son, Henry the Young King (1155–1183), as co-ruler with him but this was a Norman custom of designating an heir. Henry the Young King did not outlive his father to rule in his own right and he is not counted as a monarch on lists of kings.
Richard I Richard the Lionheart; 3 September 1189 (Note: Richard I was crowned on 3 September 1189.) – 6 April 1199 (9 years, 216 days)	Richard the Lionheart, an illustration from a 12th-century codex		8 September 1157; Beaumont Palace Son of Henry II and Eleanor of Aquitaine	Berengaria of Navarre; Limassol; 12 May 1191; No children	6 April 1199; Châlus; Shot by a crossbow bolt aged 41 (Note: Richard I was buried at Rouen Cathedral. His body currently lies at Fontevraud Abbey.)	Primogeniture: Son of Henry II
John; John Lackland; 27 May 1199 (Note: John was crowned on 27 May 1199.) – 19 October 1216 (17 years, 146 days)	King John		24 December 1166; Beaumont Palace Son of Henry II and Eleanor of Aquitaine	(1) Isabel of Gloucester; Marlborough Castle; 29 August 1189; No children (2) Isabella of Angoulême; Bordeaux Cathedral; 24 August 1200; 5 children	19 October 1216; Newark-on-Trent; Aged 49 (Note: John was buried at Worcester Cathedral.)	Son of Henry II Nomination Proximity of blood

==== Disputed claimant (House of Capet) ====
The future Louis VIII of France briefly won two-thirds of England over to his side from May 1216 to September 1217 at the conclusion of the First Barons' War against King John. Louis's claim stemmed from his wife Blanche of Castile, granddaughter of Henry II, they claimed John was an illegitimate king who lost his right to rule due to tyranny. The then-Prince Louis landed on the Isle of Thanet, off the north Kent coast, on 21 May 1216, and marched more or less unopposed to London, where the streets were lined with cheering crowds. At a grand ceremony in St. Paul's Cathedral, on 2 June 1216, in the presence of numerous English clergy and nobles, the Mayor of London and Alexander II of Scotland, Prince Louis was proclaimed King Louis of England (though not crowned). In less than a month, "King Louis" controlled more than half of the country and enjoyed the support of two-thirds of the barons. However, he suffered military defeat at the hands of the English fleet. By signing the Treaty of Lambeth in September 1217, Louis gained 10,000 marks and agreed he had never been the legitimate king of England.

Name Reign	Portrait	Arms	Birth	Marriage Issue	Death	Succession
Louis; Louis the Lion; 2 June 1216 – 20 September 1217 (1 year, 111 days)			5 September 1187; Paris Son of Philip II of France and Isabella of Hainault	Blanche of Castile; Port-Mort; 23 May 1200; 12 children	8 November 1226; Montpensier; Aged 39	Offered by the Barons Maternal grandson-in-law of Henry II Right of conquest

=== Main line of Plantagenets ===
It is from the time of Henry III, after the loss of most of the family's continental possessions, that the Plantagenet kings became more English in nature. The Houses of Lancaster and York are cadet branches of the House of Plantagenet.

Name Reign	Portrait	Arms	Birth	Marriage(s) Issue	Death	Succession
Henry III; Henry of Winchester; 28 October 1216 (Note: Henry III was crowned on 28 October 1216.) – 16 November 1272 (56 years, 20 days)	Henry III		1 October 1207; Winchester Castle Son of John and Isabella of Angoulême	Eleanor of Provence; Canterbury Cathedral; 14 January 1236; 5 children	16 November 1272; Westminster Palace; Aged 65	Primogeniture: Son of John
Edward I Edward Longshanks; 20 November 1272 (Note: Edward I was crowned on 19 August 1274 with Queen Eleanor.) – 7 July 1307 (34 years, 230 days)	Edward I of England		17 June 1239; Palace of Westminster Son of Henry III and Eleanor of Provence	(1) Eleanor of Castile; Abbey of Santa María la Real de Las Huelgas; 18 October 1254; 16 children (2) Margaret of France; Canterbury Cathedral; 10 September 1299; 3 children	7 July 1307; Burgh by Sands; Aged 68	Primogeniture: Son of Henry III
Edward II; Edward of Caernarfon; 8 July 1307 (Note: Edward II was crowned on 25 February 1308 with Queen Isabella.) – Abdicated 20 January 1327 (19 years, 197 days)			25 April 1284; Caernarfon Castle Son of Edward I and Eleanor of Castile	Isabella of France; Boulogne Cathedral; 24 January 1308; 4 children	21 September 1327; Berkeley Castle; Murdered aged 43 (Note: The date of Edward II's death is disputed by historian Ian Mortimer, who argues that he may not have been murdered, but held imprisoned in Europe for several more years.)	Primogeniture: Son of Edward I
Edward III; Edward of Windsor; 25 January 1327 (Note: Edward III was crowned on 1 February 1327.) – 21 June 1377 (50 years, 148 days)		Until 1340, 1360–1369 1340–1360, from 1369	13 November 1312; Windsor Castle Son of Edward II and Isabella of France	Philippa of Hainault; York Minster; 25 January 1328; 14 children	21 June 1377; Sheen Palace; Aged 64	Primogeniture: Son of Edward II
Richard II; Richard of Bordeaux; 22 June 1377 (Note: Richard II was crowned on 16 July 1377.) – 29 September 1399 (22 years, 100 days)			6 January 1367; Archbishop's Palace of Bordeaux Son of Edward the Black Prince and Joan of Kent	(1) Anne of Bohemia; 14 January 1382; Westminster Abbey; No children (2) Isabella of Valois; Church of St. Nicholas, Calais; 4 November 1396; No children	14 February 1400; Pontefract Castle; Aged 33	Primogeniture: Grandson of Edward III

=== House of Lancaster ===
This house descended from Edward III's third surviving son, John of Gaunt. Henry IV seized power from Richard II (and also displaced the next in line to the throne, Edmund Mortimer (then aged 7), a descendant of Edward III's second son, Lionel of Antwerp).

Name Reign	Portrait	Arms	Birth	Marriage(s) Issue	Death	Succession
Henry IV; Henry of Bolingbroke; 30 September 1399 (Note: Henry IV was crowned on 13 October 1399.) – 20 March 1413 (13 years, 172 days)	Henry IV	until 1406 from 1406	c. April 1367; Bolingbroke Castle Son of John of Gaunt and Blanche of Lancaster	(1) Mary de Bohun; Arundel Castle; 27 July 1380; 6 children (2) Joanna of Navarre; Winchester Cathedral; 7 February 1403; Stillborn twins	20 March 1413; Westminster Abbey; Aged 45	Grandson / heir male of Edward III Usurpation
Henry V Henry of Monmouth; 21 March 1413 (Note: Henry V was crowned on 9 April 1413.) – 31 August 1422 (9 years, 164 days)	Henry V		16 September 1386; Monmouth Castle Son of Henry IV and Mary de Bohun	Catherine of Valois; Troyes Cathedral; 2 June 1420; 1 son	31 August 1422; Château de Vincennes; Aged 35	Agnatic primogeniture: Son of Henry IV
(1st reign); Henry VI; 1 September 1422 (Note: Henry VI was crowned on 6 November 1429.) – 4 March 1461 (38 years, 185 days)	Henry VI		6 December 1421; Windsor Castle Son of Henry V and Catherine of Valois	Margaret of Anjou; Titchfield Abbey; 22 April 1445; 1 son	21 May 1471; Tower of London; Allegedly murdered aged 49	Agnatic primogeniture: Son of Henry V

=== House of York ===
The House of York claimed the right to the throne through Edward III's second surviving son, Lionel of Antwerp, but it inherited its name from Edward's fourth surviving son, Edmund of Langley, first Duke of York.

The Wars of the Roses (1455–1485) saw the throne pass back and forth between the rival houses of Lancaster and York.

Name Reign	Portrait	Arms	Birth	Marriage Issue	Death	Succession
(1st reign); Edward IV; 4 March 1461 (Note: Edward IV was crowned on 28 June 1461.) – 3 October 1470 (9 years, 214 days)	Edward IV		28 April 1442; Rouen Castle Son of Richard of York and Cecily Neville	Elizabeth Woodville; Grafton Regis; 1 May 1464; 10 children	9 April 1483; Westminster Palace; Aged 40	Great-great-grandson / heir general of Edward III Seizure of the Crown Act of Accord

=== House of Lancaster (restored) ===
Name Reign	Portrait	Arms	Birth	Marriage Issue	Death	Succession
(2nd reign); Henry VI; 3 October 1470 – 11 April 1471 (191 days)	Henry VI		6 December 1421; Windsor Castle Son of Henry V and Catherine of Valois	Margaret of Anjou; Titchfield Abbey; 22 April 1445; 1 son	21 May 1471; Tower of London; Allegedly murdered aged 49	Son of Henry V Seizure of the Crown

=== House of York (restored) ===
Name Reign	Portrait	Arms	Birth	Marriage Issue	Death	Succession
(2nd reign); Edward IV; 11 April 1471 – 9 April 1483 (11 years, 364 days)	Edward IV		28 April 1442; Rouen Castle Son of Richard of York and Cecily Neville	Elizabeth Woodville; Grafton Regis; 1 May 1464; 10 children	9 April 1483; Westminster Palace; Aged 40	Great-great-grandson / heir general of Edward III Seizure of the Crown Act of Accord
Edward V 9 April 1483 – 25 June 1483 (Note: Edward V was deposed by Richard III, who usurped the throne on the grounds that Edward was illegitimate. He was never crowned.) (78 days)	Edward V		2 November 1470; Cheyneygates, Westminster Abbey Son of Edward IV and Elizabeth Woodville	Unmarried	Disappeared mid-1483 Tower of London; Allegedly murdered aged 12	Primogeniture: Son of Edward IV
Richard III; 26 June 1483 (Note: Richard III was crowned on 6 July 1483 with Queen Anne.) – 22 August 1485 (2 years, 58 days)	Richard III		2 October 1452; Fotheringhay Castle Son of Richard of York and Cecily Neville	Anne Neville; Westminster Abbey; 12 July 1472; 1 son	22 August 1485; Bosworth Field; Killed in battle aged 32 (Note: The body of Richard III was exhumed and reburied in Leicester Cathedral in 2015.)	Great-great-grandson of Edward III Titulus Regius

== House of Tudor (1485–1603) ==
The Tudors descended in the female line from John Beaufort, one of the illegitimate children of John of Gaunt (third surviving son of Edward III), by Gaunt's long-term mistress Katherine Swynford. Those descended from English monarchs only through an illegitimate child would normally have no claim on the throne, but the situation was complicated when Gaunt and Swynford eventually married in 1396 (25 years after John Beaufort's birth). In view of the marriage, the church retroactively declared the Beauforts legitimate via a papal bull the same year. Parliament did the same in an Act in 1397. A subsequent proclamation by John of Gaunt's legitimate son, King Henry IV, also recognised the Beauforts' legitimacy, but declared them ineligible ever to inherit the throne. Nevertheless, the Beauforts remained closely allied with Gaunt's other descendants, the Royal House of Lancaster.

John Beaufort's granddaughter Lady Margaret Beaufort was married to Edmund Tudor. Tudor was the son of Welsh courtier Owain Tudur (anglicised to Owen Tudor) and Catherine of Valois, the widow of the Lancastrian King Henry V. Edmund Tudor and his siblings were either illegitimate, or the product of a secret marriage, and owed their fortunes to the goodwill of their legitimate half-brother King Henry VI. When the House of Lancaster fell from power, the Tudors followed.

By the late 15th century, the Tudors were the last hope for the Lancaster supporters. Edmund Tudor's son became king as Henry VII after defeating Richard III at the Battle of Bosworth Field in 1485, winning the Wars of the Roses. King Henry VII married Elizabeth of York, daughter of Edward IV, thereby uniting the Lancastrian and York lineages. (See family tree.)

Name Reign	Portrait	Arms	Birth	Marriage(s) Issue	Death	Succession
Henry VII; 22 August 1485 (Note: Henry VII was crowned on 30 October 1485.) – 21 April 1509 (23 years, 243 days)	Henry VII, by Michel Sittow, 1505		28 January 1457; Pembroke Castle Son of Edmund Tudor and Margaret Beaufort	Elizabeth of York; Westminster Abbey; 18 January 1486; 8 children	21 April 1509; Richmond Palace; Aged 52	Great-great-great-grandson of Edward III Right of conquest Marriage to Elizabeth of York
Henry VIII; 22 April 1509 (Note: Henry VIII was crowned on 24 June 1509 with Queen Catherine.) – 28 January 1547 (37 years, 282 days)	Henry VIII, by Hans Holbein, c. 1536		28 June 1491; Greenwich Palace Son of Henry VII and Elizabeth of York	(1) Catherine of Aragon; Church of the Observant Friars, Greenwich; 11 June 1509; 1 surviving child (2) Anne Boleyn; Westminster Palace; 25 January 1533 (Note: Edward Hall and Raphael Holinshed both record an earlier secret wedding between Henry and Anne, which was conducted in Dover on 15 November 1532.); 1 surviving child (3) Jane Seymour; Whitehall Palace; 30 May 1536; 1 child 3 further marriages No more children	28 January 1547; Whitehall Palace; Aged 55	Son of Henry VII Primogeniture
Edward VI; 28 January 1547 (Note: Edward VI was crowned on 20 February 1547.) – 6 July 1553 (6 years, 160 days)	Edward VI, by Hans Eworth		12 October 1537; Hampton Court Palace Son of Henry VIII and Jane Seymour	Unmarried	6 July 1553; Greenwich Palace; Aged 15	Primogeniture: Son of Henry VIII

=== Disputed claimant ===
Edward VI named Lady Jane Grey as his heir in his will, overruling the order of succession laid down by Parliament in the Third Succession Act. Four days after his death on 6 July 1553, Jane was proclaimed queen—the first of three Tudor women to be proclaimed queen regnant. Nine days after the proclamation, on 19 July, the Privy Council switched allegiance and proclaimed Edward VI's Catholic half-sister Mary queen. Jane was later executed for treason.

Name Reign	Portrait	Arms	Birth	Marriage Issue	Death	Succession
Jane; Lady Jane Grey; 10 July 1553 – 19 July 1553 (9 days)			1536 or 1537; Bradgate Park Daughter of the 1st Duke of Suffolk and Frances Brandon	Guildford Dudley; Durham House; 21 May 1553; No children	12 February 1554; Tower Green; Executed aged about 17	Great-granddaughter of Henry VII Devise for the Succession

=== Undisputed ===
Name Reign	Portrait	Arms	Birth	Marriage(s) Issue	Death	Succession
Mary I 19 July 1553 (Note: Mary I was crowned on 1 October 1553.) – 17 November 1558 (5 years, 122 days)	Mary I, by Antonius Mor, 1554		18 February 1516; Greenwich Palace Daughter of Henry VIII and Catherine of Aragon	Philip II of Spain; Winchester Cathedral; 25 July 1554; No children	17 November 1558; St James's Palace; Aged 42	Daughter of Henry VIII Third Succession Act
(Jure uxoris); Philip; 25 July 1554 (Note: Philip was not meant to be a mere consort; rather, the status of Mary I's husband was envisioned as that of a co-monarch during her reign. However the extent of his authority and his status are ambiguous. The Act says that Philip shall have the title of king and "shall aid her Highness ... in the happy administration of her Grace's realms and dominions", but elsewhere says that Mary shall be the sole Queen.) – 17 November 1558 (4 years, 116 days)	King Philip of England		21 May 1527; Palacio de Pimentel Son of Charles V of the Holy Roman Empire and Isabella of Portugal	Mary I Winchester Cathedral; 25 July 1554; No children 3 other marriages 7 children	13 September 1598; El Escorial; Aged 71	Husband of Mary I Act for the Marriage of Queen Mary to Philip of Spain
Under the terms of the marriage treaty between Philip I of Naples (later Philip II of Spain from 15 January 1556) and Queen Mary I, Philip was to enjoy Mary's titles and honours for as long as their marriage should last. All official documents, including acts of Parliament, were to be dated with both their names, and Parliament was to be called under the joint authority of the couple. Queen Mary's Marriage Act 1554 gave him the title of king and stated that he "shall aid her Highness ... in the happy administration of her Grace's realms and dominions" (although elsewhere the act stated that Mary was to be "sole queen"). Nonetheless, Philip was to co-reign with his wife. (Note: As the new King of England could not read English, it was ordered that a note of all matters of state should be made in Latin or Spanish. Coins were minted showing the heads of both Mary and Philip, and the coat of arms of England was impaled with Philip's to denote their joint reign. Acts were passed in England (the Treason Act 1554) and in Ireland (the Treason Act 1556) which made it high treason to deny Philip's royal authority.)
Elizabeth I 17 November 1558 (Note: Elizabeth I was crowned on 15 January 1559.) – 24 March 1603 (44 years, 128 days) See also: Elizabethan era	Elizabeth I, by Darnley		7 September 1533; Greenwich Palace Daughter of Henry VIII and Anne Boleyn	Unmarried	24 March 1603; Richmond Palace; Aged 69	Daughter of Henry VIII Third Succession Act

== House of Stuart (1603–1649) ==
Elizabeth's cousin, King James VI of Scotland, succeeded to the English throne as James I in the Union of the Crowns. James was descended from the Tudors through his great-grandmother, Margaret Tudor, the eldest daughter of Henry VII and wife of James IV of Scotland. In 1604, he adopted the title King of Great Britain. However, the two parliaments remained separate until the Acts of Union 1707.

Name Reign	Portrait	Arms	Birth	Marriage Issue	Death	Succession
James I 24 March 1603 (Note: James I was crowned on 25 July 1603 with Queen Anne.) – 27 March 1625 (22 years, 4 days)	James I, by Paulus van Somer		19 June 1566; Edinburgh Castle Son of Mary, Queen of Scots, and Henry Stuart, Lord Darnley	Anne of Denmark; Old Bishop's Palace, Oslo; 23 November 1589; 7 children	27 March 1625; Theobalds House; Aged 58	Great-great-grandson / heir general of Henry VII
Charles I 27 March 1625 (Note: Charles I was crowned on 2 February 1626.) – 30 January 1649 (23 years, 310 days)	Charles I, by Anthony van Dyck		19 November 1600; Dunfermline Palace Son of James I and Anne of Denmark	Henrietta Maria of France; St Augustine's Abbey; 13 June 1625; 9 children	30 January 1649; Whitehall Palace; Executed aged 48	Cognatic primogeniture: Son of James I

== First Interregnum (1649–1660) ==
No monarch reigned after the 1649 execution of Charles I. Between 1649 and 1653, there was no single English head of state, as England was ruled directly by the Rump Parliament with the English Council of State acting as executive power during a period known as the Commonwealth of England.

After a coup d'etat in 1653, Oliver Cromwell forcibly took control of England from Parliament. He dissolved the Rump Parliament at the head of a military force and England entered The Protectorate period, under Cromwell's direct control with the title Lord Protector.

It was within the power of the Lord Protector to choose his heir and Oliver Cromwell chose his eldest son, Richard Cromwell, to succeed him.

Name Reign	Portrait	Arms	Birth	Marriage Issue	Death
Oliver Cromwell; 16 December 1653 – 3 September 1658 (4 years, 262 days)	Oliver Cromwell		25 April 1599; Huntingdon Son of Robert Cromwell and Elizabeth Steward	Elizabeth Bourchier; St Giles; 22 August 1620; 9 children	3 September 1658; Whitehall; Aged 59
Richard Cromwell; 3 September 1658 – 7 May 1659 (247 days)	Richard Cromwell, c. 1650		4 October 1626; Huntingdon Son of Oliver Cromwell and Elizabeth Bourchier	Dorothy Maijor; May 1649; 9 children	12 July 1712; Cheshunt; Aged 85

Richard Cromwell was forcibly removed by the English Committee of Safety in May 1659. England again lacked any single head of state. After almost a year of anarchy, the monarchy was formally restored when Charles II returned from France to accept the throne.

== House of Stuart (restored) (1660–1707) ==
The Monarchy was restored under the rule of Charles II.

Name Reign	Portrait	Arms	Birth	Marriage(s) Issue	Death	Succession
Charles II; 29 May 1660 (Note: Charles II was crowned on 23 April 1661 but had been recognised by Royalists in 1649.) – 6 February 1685 (24 years, 254 days)			29 May 1630; St James's Palace Son of Charles I and Henrietta Maria of France	Catherine of Braganza; Royal Garrison Church; 21 May 1662; No children	6 February 1685; Whitehall Palace; Aged 54	Stuart Restoration Cognatic primogeniture: Son of Charles I
James II; 6 February 1685 (Note: James II was crowned on 23 April 1685 with Queen Mary.) – 23 December 1688 (Overthrown after 3 years, 321 days)			14 October 1633; St James's Palace Son of Charles I and Henrietta Maria of France	(1) Anne Hyde; Worcester House, The Strand; 3 September 1660; 8 children (2) Mary of Modena; Dover Castle; 21 November 1673; 7 living children	16 September 1701; Château de Saint-Germain-en-Laye; Aged 67	Cognatic primogeniture: Son of Charles I and brother of Charles II

== Second Interregnum 1688–1689 ==
James II was ousted by Parliament less than four years after ascending to the throne, beginning the century's second interregnum. To settle the question of who should replace the deposed monarch, a Convention Parliament elected James's daughter Mary II and her husband (also his nephew) William III co-regents, in the Glorious Revolution.

== Houses of Stuart and Orange ==
Name Reign	Portrait	Arms	Birth	Marriage Issue	Death	Succession
Mary II; 13 February 1689 (Note: Mary II and William III were crowned on 11 April 1689.) – 28 December 1694 (5 years, 319 days)			30 April 1662; St James's Palace Daughter of James II and Anne Hyde	William III of England; St James's Palace; 4 November 1677; No children	28 December 1694; Kensington Palace; Aged 32	Daughter of James II Offered the Crown by Parliament
William III; William of Orange; 13 February 1689 – 8 March 1702 (13 years, 24 days)			4 November 1650; The Binnenhof Son of William II of Orange and Mary, Princess Royal of England	Mary II; St James's Palace; 4 November 1677; No children	8 March 1702; Kensington Palace; Aged 51	Grandson of Charles I Offered the Crown by Parliament
Anne; 8 March 1702 (Note: Anne was crowned on 23 April 1702.) – 1 May 1707 (5 years, 55 days) (Queen of Great Britain until 1 August 1714) (12 years, 147 days)			6 February 1665; St James's Palace Daughter of James II and Anne Hyde	George of Denmark; St James's Palace; 28 July 1683; 5 living children	1 August 1714; Kensington Palace; Aged 49	Cognatic primogeniture: Daughter of James II Bill of Rights 1689

While James and his descendants continued to claim the throne, all Catholics (such as James II's son and grandson, James Francis Edward and Charles respectively) were barred from the throne by the Act of Settlement 1701, enacted by Anne, another of James's Protestant daughters.

With the Acts of Union 1707, England ceased to be a sovereign state, and became part of the new Kingdom of Great Britain; see List of British monarchs.

== Acts of Union ==
The Acts of Union 1707 were a pair of acts of Parliament passed during 1706 and 1707 by the Parliament of England and the Parliament of Scotland to put into effect the Treaty of Union agreed on 22 July 1706. The acts joined the Kingdom of England and the Kingdom of Scotland (previously separate sovereign states, with separate legislatures but with the same monarch) into the Kingdom of Great Britain.

England, Scotland, and Ireland had shared a monarch for more than a hundred years, since the Union of the Crowns in 1603, when King James VI of Scotland inherited the English and Irish thrones from his first cousin twice removed, Queen Elizabeth I.

== Timeline ==
Timeline of English monarchs

== Titles ==
The standard title for all monarchs from Æthelstan until the time of King John was Rex Anglorum ("King of the English"). In addition, many of the pre-Norman kings assumed extra titles, as follows:

- Æthelstan: Rex totius Britanniae ("King of All Britain")
- Edmund the Magnificent: Rex Britanniæ ("King of Britain") and Rex Anglorum cæterarumque gentium gobernator et rector ("King of the English and of other peoples governor and director")
- Eadred: Regis qui regimina regnorum Angulsaxna, Norþhymbra, Paganorum, Brettonumque ("Reigning over the governments of the kingdoms of the Anglo-Saxons, Northumbrians, Pagans, and British")
- Eadwig the Fair: Rex nutu Dei Angulsæxna et Northanhumbrorum imperator paganorum gubernator Breotonumque propugnator ("King by the will of God, Emperor of the Anglo-Saxons and Northumbrians, governor of the pagans, commander of the British")
- Edgar the Peaceful: Totius Albionis finitimorumque regum basileus ("King of all Albion and its neighbouring realms")
- Cnut the Great: Rex Anglorum totiusque Brittannice orbis gubernator et rector ("King of the English and of all the British sphere governor and ruler") and Brytannie totius Anglorum monarchus ("Monarch of all the English of Britain")

In the Norman period Rex Anglorum remained standard, with occasional use of Rex Angliae ("King of England"). The Empress Matilda styled herself Domina Anglorum ("Lady of the English").

Since the time of King John all other titles have been eschewed in favour of Rex or Regina Angliae.

In 1604 James I, who had inherited the English throne the previous year, adopted the title (now usually rendered in English rather than Latin) King of Great Britain. The English and Scottish parliaments, however, did not recognise this title until the Acts of Union of 1707 under Queen Anne (who was Queen of Great Britain rather than king). (Note: After the personal union of the crowns, James was the first to style himself King of Great Britain, but the title was rejected by the English Parliament and had no basis in law. The Parliament of Scotland also opposed it.)

== See also ==
- Alternative successions to the English and British Crown
- Bretwalda
- Demise of the Crown
- Heptarchy
- History of the English monarchy
- Succession to the British throne, a historical overview and current rules
  - Succession to the British throne § Current line of succession, a list of people
- List of English royal consorts
- Family tree of English monarchs
- Family tree of British monarchs
- List of office-holders of the United Kingdom and predecessor states
  - List of British monarchs
  - Lists of monarchs in the British Isles
  - List of Irish monarchs
  - List of monarchs of the British Isles by cause of death
  - List of monarchs of Wessex, AD 519 to 927
  - List of rulers of Wales
  - List of Scottish monarchs
- Mnemonic verses of monarchs in England
- List of legendary kings of Britain
