= Act for the Marriage of Queen Mary to Philip of Spain =

Act of the Parliament of England

Queen Mary's Marriage Act 1554
- Act of Parliament
- Parliament of England
- Long title: An Act, touching the Articles of the Queen's Highness's most Noble Marriage.
- Citation: 1 Mar. Sess. 3 c. 2
- Territorial extent: England and Wales

Dates
- Royal assent: 5 May 1554
- Commencement: 2 April 1554 (Note: Start of session.)
- Repealed: 10 August 1872

Other legislation
- Repealed by: Statute Law Revision Act 1863
- Relates to: Queen Regent's Prerogative Act 1554

Status: Repealed

Text of statute as originally enacted

The Act for the Marriage of Queen Mary to Philip of Spain (1 Mar. Sess. 3 c. 2), or Queen Mary's Marriage Act, was an act of the Parliament of England to regulate the future marriage and joint reign of Queen Mary I and Philip of Spain, son and heir apparent of the Holy Roman Emperor Charles V.

In reality, the act seems to have served as a business contract between England and Spain; it specifies what Spain could expect from the union, while at the same time assuring the English that England would not become a satellite of Spain.

== The act ==
Under the terms of the marriage treaty, Philip was to enjoy his wife's titles and honours as King of England and Ireland for as long as their marriage should last. All official documents, including Acts of Parliament, were to be dated with both their names (with Philip's preceding Mary's as deemed proper for husband and wife), and the Parliament of England was to be called under the joint authority of the couple. The act stated that King Philip would take part in governing Mary's realms while reserving most authority for Mary herself. Formally, King Philip was to co-reign with his wife according to the act, which nevertheless ensured that the new king would not become too powerful; the act prohibited him from appointing foreigners to any offices, from taking his wife or any child that might be born to them outside her realm, or from claiming the crown for himself should he outlive his wife.

The act presumed that Mary would have children with Philip and allowed full personal union between England and Ireland and all the realms Philip was to inherit from his father or from his grandmother, Queen Joanna, should Charles, Philip's son by a prior marriage, die childless.

Mary I married Philip of Spain at Winchester on 25 July 1554.

== Subsequent developments ==
The whole act was repealed by section 1 of, and the schedule to, the Statute Law Revision Act 1863 (26 & 27 Vict. c. 125), which came into force on 28 July 1863.

== See also ==
- Jure uxoris
- Treason Act 1554

== Bibliography ==
- Kelsey, Harry (2012). "The Marriage of England and Spain". Philip of Spain, King of England: The Forgotten Sovereign. I.B.Tauris. ISBN 978-1-84885-716-2.
- Montrose, Louis (15 June 2006). The Subject of Elizabeth: Authority, Gender, and Representation. University of Chicago Press. ISBN 978-0-226-53475-6.
- Porter, Linda (2 September 2010). "The Neglected Wife". Mary Tudor: The First Queen. Little, Brown Book Group. ISBN 978-0-7481-2232-5.
