= Mnemonic verses of monarchs in England =

A mnemonic verse listing monarchs ruling in England since William the Conqueror was traditionally used by British schoolchildren in the era when rote learning formed a major part of the curriculum.

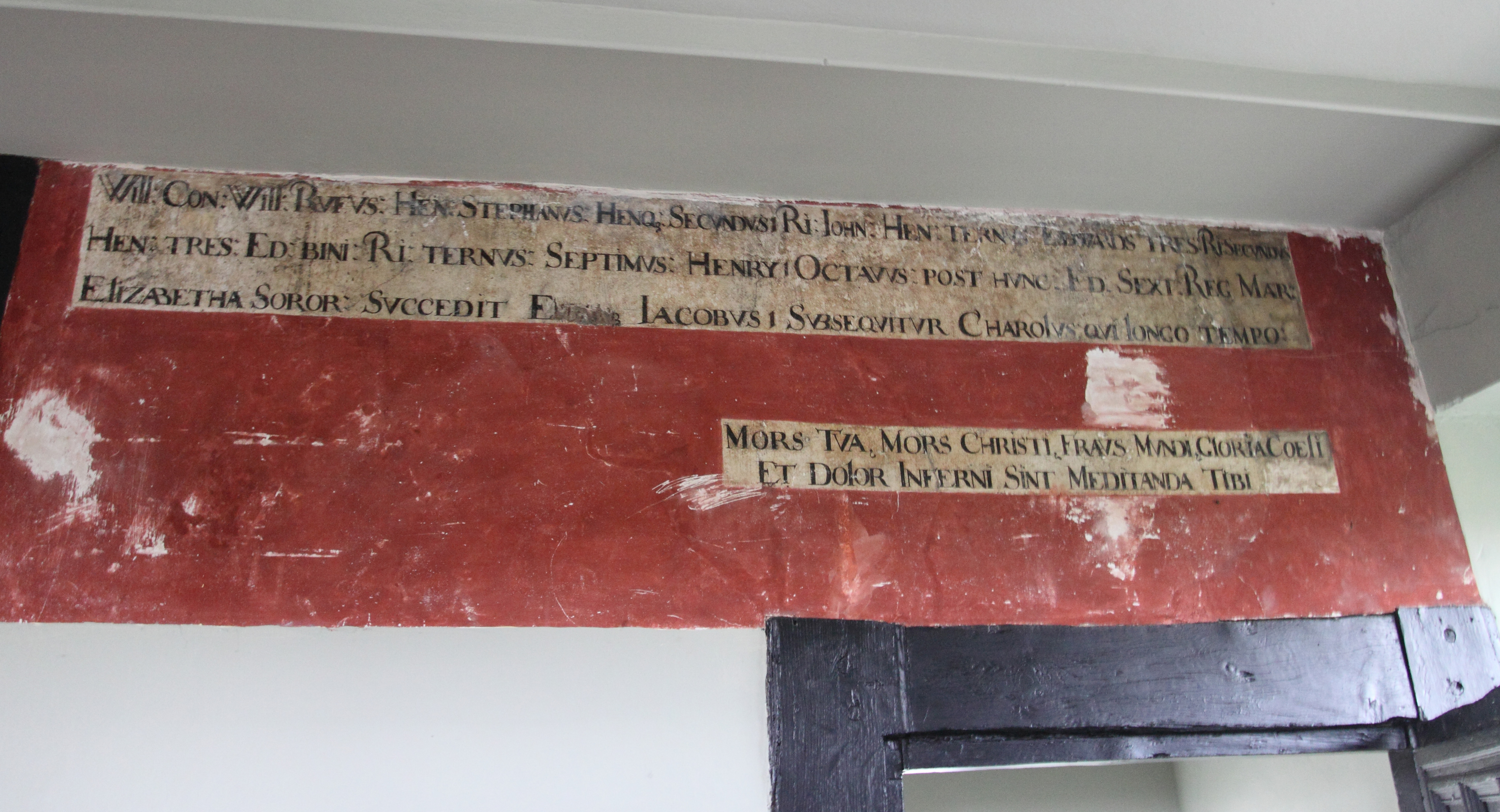
List of kings of England in Canonbury Tower as far as Charles I

== The verse ==
Various versions of the verse exist. One version is:

Willie Willie Harry Stee
Harry Dick John Harry three;
One two three Neds, Richard two
Harrys four five six ... then who?
Edwards four five, Dick the bad,
Harrys (twain),^{VII} ^{VIII} Ned six (the lad);
Mary, Bessie, James you ken,
Then Charlie, Charlie, James again...
Will and Mary, Anna Gloria,
Georges four,^{I} ^{II} ^{III} ^{IV} Will four, Victoria;
Edward seven next, and then
Came George the fifth in nineteen ten;
Ned the eighth soon abdicated
Then George six was coronated;
After which Elizabeth
And that's all folks until her death.

A slightly shorter version that is sometimes used is:

Willie, Willie, Harry, Stee,
Harry, Dick, John, Harry three;
One two three Neds, Richard two,
Harrys four five six, ... then who?
Edwards four five, Dick the bad,
Harrys (twain),^{VII} ^{VIII} Ned six (the lad);
Mary, Bessie, James you ken,
Then Charlie, Charlie, James again;
Will and Mary, Anna Gloria,
Georges four,^{I} ^{II} ^{III} ^{IV} Will four, Victoria;
Edward seven, George and Ted,
George the sixth, now Liz instead.

These lists omit several disputed monarchs (including Empress Matilda, Henry the Young King, Louis VIII of France, Philip II of Spain and Lady Jane Grey), and do not mention the Commonwealth of England.

Both of these versions were written before the death of Elizabeth II in 2022. The current monarch is Charles III, the successor to Elizabeth II.

=== Published versions ===
Alan Bennett quotes and adapts the verse in his 1968 play Forty Years On. The scene with the verse is set during the Second World War, before the accession of Elizabeth II, and Bennett's version stops at Victoria.

The 1991 film King Ralph includes a brief section of the verse.

=== Other verses listing British monarchs ===
The Monarchs' Song from the CBBC TV series Horrible Histories lists the monarchs of England and has some phrases in common with the traditional verse. The original version was released in 2011 which stopped at Elizabeth II with the verse "And Queen Liz two completes the mix!". An updated version was released on 2 May 2023 (four days before the coronation), adding the verse "Not quite. Now there's me, Charles three!".

The lyrics are as follows:

William, William, Henry, Stephen, Henry, Richard, John, oi! Henry, Ed, Ed, Ed, Rich two, now three more Henrys join our song, Edward, Edward, Richard the third, Henry, Henry, Ed again, Mary one, good Queen Bess, Jimmy, Charles and Charles and then Jim, Will, Mary, Anna Gloria, George, George, George, George, Will, Victoria, Edward, George, Edward, George six, and Queen Liz two completes the mix.

The King's Singers include a 12-minute song "A Rough Guide to the Royal Succession (It's just one damn King after another…)" by Paul Drayton, on their 2012 album Royal Rhymes and Rounds. This song bears no relation to the mnemonic verses except for its subject matter, a chronology of the monarchy starting with pre-Norman kings "With names that no-one can spell / Cerdic and Ceolwulf / Egbert and Athelstan / And Ethelbald as well."

== Mnemonic for royal houses ==
A different mnemonic is used to remember the sequence of English and British royal houses or dynasties.

No Plan Like Yours To Study History Wisely

The initial letters of which give the royal houses:

Norman, Plantagenet, Lancaster, York, Tudor, Stuart, Hanover, Windsor

This list of royal houses differs from the views of many historians. For example, Lancaster and York are considered cadet branches of the House of Plantagenet, and the House of Saxe-Coburg-Gotha was renamed as Windsor in 1917.

== See also ==
- List of English monarchs
- List of British monarchs
