= Distress Act 1554 =

Act of the Parliament of England

Distress Act 1554 (Note: The citation of this act by this short title was authorised by section 5 of, and the second schedule to, the Statute Law Revision Act 1948. Due to the repeal of those provisions, it is now authorised by section 19(2) of the Interpretation Act 1978.)
- Act of Parliament
- Parliament of England
- Long title: An Acte touching thimpounding of Distresses. (Note: These words are printed against this act in the second column of the second schedule to the Statute Law Revision Act 1948, which is headed "Title".)
- Citation: 1 & 2 Ph. & M. c. 12
- Territorial extent: England and Wales

Dates
- Royal assent: 16 January 1555
- Commencement: 1 April 1555 (Note: Start of session.)
- Repealed: 1 January 1970

Other legislation
- Repealed by: Statute Law Revision Act 1863; Statute Law Revision Act 1888; Statute Law Revision Act 1948; Statute Law (Repeals) Act 1969

Status: Repealed

Text of statute as originally enacted

The Distress Act 1554 (1 & 2 Ph. & M. c. 12) was an act of the Parliament of England.

== Subsequent developments ==
Section 3 of the act was repealed by section 1 of, and the schedule to, the Statute Law Revision Act 1863 (26 & 27 Vict. c. 125), which came into force on 28 July 1863.

Section 2 of the act, from "further" to "aforesaid that" was repealed by section 1(1) of, and part I of the schedule to, the Statute Law Revision Act 1888 (51 & 52 Vict. c. 3), which came into force on 27 March 1888.

The words of commencement were repealed by section 1 of, and the first schedule to, the Statute Law Revision Act 1948 (11 & 12 Geo. 6. c. 62), which came into force on 30 July 1948.

The whole act was repealed by section 1 of, and part VII of the schedule to, the Statute Law (Repeals) Act 1969, which came into force on 1 January 1970.
