= List of acts of the Parliament of England from 1554 =

This is a list of acts of the Parliament of England for the year 1554.

For acts passed during the period 1707–1800, see the list of acts of the Parliament of Great Britain. See also the list of acts of the Parliament of Scotland, and the list of acts of the Parliament of Ireland.

For acts passed from 1801 onwards, see the list of acts of the Parliament of the United Kingdom. For acts of the devolved parliaments and assemblies in the United Kingdom, see the list of acts of the Scottish Parliament, the list of acts of the Northern Ireland Assembly, and the list of acts and measures of Senedd Cymru; see also the list of acts of the Parliament of Northern Ireland.

For medieval statutes, etc. that are not considered to be acts of Parliament, see the list of English statutes.

See also the List of ordinances and acts of the Parliament of England, 1642–1660 for ordinances and acts passed by the Long Parliament and other bodies without royal assent, and which were not considered to be valid legislation following the Restoration in 1660.

The number shown after each act's title is its chapter number. Acts are cited using this number, preceded by the years of the reign during which the relevant parliamentary session was held; thus the Union with Ireland Act 1800 is cited as "39 & 40 Geo. 3. c. 67", meaning the 67th act passed during the session that started in the 39th year of the reign of George III and which finished in the 40th year of that reign. The modern convention is to use Arabic numerals in citations (thus "41 Geo. 3" rather than "41 Geo. III"). Acts of the last session of the Parliament of Great Britain and the first session of the Parliament of the United Kingdom are both cited as "41 Geo. 3".

Acts passed by the Parliament of England did not have a short title; however, some of these acts have subsequently been given a short title by acts of the Parliament of the United Kingdom, such as the Short Titles Act 1896 (59 & 60 Vict. c. 14).

Acts passed by the Parliament of England were deemed to have come into effect on the first day of the session in which they were passed. Because of this, the years given in the list below may in fact be the year before a particular act was passed.

== 1 Mar. Sess. 3 ==
The 2nd Parliament of Queen Mary I, which met from 2 April 1554 until 5 May 1554.

These acts are also cited as 1. M. Sess. 3, 1 Mar. Stat. 3 or 1 M. Stat. 3.

=== Public acts ===
Short title	Citation	Royal assent
Long title
Queen Regent's Prerogative Act 1554 (repealed)	1 Mar. Sess. 3. c. 1	5 May 1554
An Acte declaring that the Regall Power of this Realme is in the Quenes Majestie as fully and absolutely as ever it was in any of her moste noble Progenitours Kinges of this Realme. (Repealed by Statute Law (Repeals) Act 1969 (c. 52))
Queen Mary's Marriage Act 1554 (repealed)	1 Mar. Sess. 3. c. 2	5 May 1554
An Act, touching the Articles of the Queen's Highness's most Noble Marriage. (Repealed by Statute Law Revision Act 1863 (26 & 27 Vict. c. 125))
See of Durham Act 1554	1 Mar. Sess. 3. c. 3	5 May 1554
An Act for the Repeal of Two several Acts, (Note: Gateside Act 1553 (7 Edw. 6. c. 10)) (Note: See of Durham Act 1553 (7 Edw. 6. c. 1 Pr.)) made Anno Septimo Edwardi Sexti, touching the Dissolution of the Bishoprick of Durham.
Lord Steward Act 1554	1 Mar. Sess. 3. c. 4	5 May 1554
An Acte for thestablishing of thoffice of the L. Steward of the Quenes Majesties most Honourable Housholde.
Sherborne Causeway Act 1554 (repealed)	1 Mar. Sess. 3. c. 5	5 May 1554
An Act for the Continuation of a Statute made for the Repairing of Sherborne Cawseye. (Repealed by Statute Law Revision Act 1948 (11 & 12 Geo. 6. c. 62))
Bristol to Gloucester Highway Act 1554 (repealed)	1 Mar. Sess. 3. c. 6	5 May 1554
An Act for the Repairing of a Cawsey betwixt Bristowe and Gloucetre. (Repealed by Statute Law Revision Act 1948 (11 & 12 Geo. 6. c. 62))
Cloth Making Act 1554 (repealed)	1 Mar. Sess. 3. c. 7	5 May 1554
An Act touching Cloth-making in Corporate Towns and Market Towns. (Repealed by Woollen Manufacture Act 1809 (49 Geo. 3. c. 109))
Leather Act 1554 (repealed)	1 Mar. Sess. 3. c. 8	5 May 1554
An Act touching the Buying and Currying of Leather. (Repealed by Repeal of Obsolete Statutes Act 1856 (19 & 20 Vict. c. 64))
Cathedral, etc. Churches Act 1554 (repealed)	1 Mar. Sess. 3. c. 9	5 May 1554
An Act touching Ordinances and Rules in Cathedral Churches and Schools. (Repealed by Statute Law Revision Act 1863 (26 & 27 Vict. c. 125))
Essex Churches Act 1554	1 Mar. Sess. 3. c. 10	5 May 1554
An Act for the Repeal of a Statute made for the Uniting of the Parish Churches of Onger and Grenestede, in the County of Essex.
Glamorganshire Sea Sands Act 1554 (repealed)	1 Mar. Sess. 3. c. 11	5 May 1554
An Act touching the Sea Sands in Glamorganshire. (Repealed by Land Drainage Act 1930 (20 & 21 Geo. 5. c. 44))
Continuance of Laws Act 1554 (repealed)	1 Mar. Sess. 3. c. 12	5 May 1554
An Act for the Continuance of certain Statutes. (Repealed by Statute Law Revision Act 1863 (26 & 27 Vict. c. 125))

=== Private acts ===
Short title	Citation	Royal assent
Long title
Restitution in blood of Sir William Parr, late Marquis of Northampton.	1 Mar. Sess. 3. c. 1 Pr.	5 May 1554
An Act for the Restitution in Blood of Sir William Parre, Knight, late Marquis of Northampton.
Restitution and assurance of manors of Gaywood and Rising (Norfolk) to Thomas Howard, Earl of Surrey.	1 Mar. Sess. 3. c. 2 Pr.	5 May 1554
An Act for the Assurance of the Manor of Gaywood and Risyng to Thomas Howarde, Knight, otherwise called Thomas Howarde, Earl of Surreye.
Ratification of Dame Lucy Clifford's estate in the manor of Burston Hawgh.	1 Mar. Sess. 3. c. 3 Pr.	5 May 1554
An Act, ratifying and confirming the State of Dame Lucye Clifforde, in the Manor of Burston Haughe.

=== Sources ===
- "1° Mariæ, St. 3". The Statutes of the Realm. Vol. 4 Part 1: 1547 to 1584. pp. 221–236 – via Internet Archive.
- "1° Mariæ, St. 3". The Statutes of the Realm. Vol. 4 Part 1: 1547 to 1584. pp. 221–236 – via HathiTrust.
- "1° Mariæ, St. 3". The Statutes of the Realm. Vol. 4 Part 1: 1547 to 1584. pp. 221–236 – via Google Books.
- Pickering, Danby, ed. (1763). "Anno primo Mariæ, sessio tertia". The Statutes at Large. Vol. 6: from the First Year of Queen Mary to the Thirty-fifth Year of Queen Elizabeth, inclusive. Cambridge: Joseph Bentham. pp. 18–25 – via Internet Archive.
- Pickering, Danby, ed. (1763). "Anno primo Mariæ, sessio tertia". The Statutes at Large. Vol. 6: from the First Year of Queen Mary to the Thirty-fifth Year of Queen Elizabeth, inclusive. Cambridge: Joseph Bentham. pp. 18–25 – via Internet Archive.
- Journal of the House of Commons. Vol. 1 – 1547-1629. His Majesty's Stationery Office. 1802 – via British History Online.
- Journal of the House of Lords. Vol. 1: 1509-1577. London: His Majesty's Stationery Office. 1830 – via British History Online.
- Chronological Table of and Index to the Statutes. Vol. 1: To the End of the Session 59 Vict. Sess. 2 (1895) (13th ed.). London: Her Majesty's Stationery Office. 1896. p. 57 – via Google Books.
- Chronological Table of the Statutes: Covering the Period from 1235 to the End of 1971. London: Her Majesty's Stationery Office. 1972. p. 54. ISBN 978-0-11-840096-1 – via Google Books.
- "Acts of the English Parliament from 1554". legislation.gov.uk. The National Archives.
- "Chronological Tables of the Private and Personal Acts: Part 1 (1539–1601)". legislation.gov.uk. The National Archives.

== 1 & 2 Ph. & M. ==
The 1st Parliament of King Philip and Queen Mary, which met from 12 November 1554 until 16 January 1555.

This session was also traditionally cited as 1 & 2 Phil. & Mary, 1 & 2 Phil. & Mar. or 1 & 2 P. & M.

=== Public acts ===
Short title	Citation	Royal assent
Long title
Signing of Letters Patent, etc. Act 1554 (repealed)	1 & 2 Ph. & M. c. 1	16 January 1555
An Act touching Letters Patents, and other Writings to be signed by the Queen. (Repealed by Statute Law Revision Act 1863 (26 & 27 Vict. c. 125))
Apparel Act 1554 (repealed)	1 & 2 Ph. & M. c. 2	16 January 1555
An Act for Reformation of Excess in Apparel. (Repealed by Continuance, etc. of Laws Act 1603 (1 Jas. 1. c. 25))
Seditious Words Act 1554 (repealed)	1 & 2 Ph. & M. c. 3	16 January 1555
An Act against seditious Words and Rumours. (Repealed by Statute Law Revision Act 1863 (26 & 27 Vict. c. 125))
Egyptians Act 1554 (repealed)	1 & 2 Ph. & M. c. 4	16 January 1555
An Act against certain Persons calling themselves Egyptians. (Repealed by Repeal of Obsolete Statutes Act 1856 (19 & 20 Vict. c. 64))
Exportation Act 1554 (repealed)	1 & 2 Ph. & M. c. 5	16 January 1555
An Act to restrain the carrying of Corn, Victual, and Wood, over the Seas. (Repealed by Statute Law Revision Act 1863 (26 & 27 Vict. c. 125))
Heresy Revival Act 1554 (repealed)	1 & 2 Ph. & M. c. 6	16 January 1555
An Act for the reviving of Three Statutes, made for the Punishment of Heresy. (Repealed by Act of Supremacy 1558 (1 Eliz. 1. c. 1))
Towns Corporate Act 1554 (repealed)	1 & 2 Ph. & M. c. 7	16 January 1555
An Act, That Persons, dwelling in the Country, shall not sell by Retail divers Wares in Cities and Towns Corporate. (Repealed by Repeal of Obsolete Statutes Act 1856 (19 & 20 Vict. c. 64))
See of Rome Act 1554 (repealed)	1 & 2 Ph. & M. c. 8	16 January 1555
An Act repealing all Articles and Provisions made against the See Apostolick of Rome, since the twentieth Year of King Henry the Eighth, and for the Establishment of all Spiritual and Ecclesiastical Possessions and Hereditaments conveyed to the Laity. (Repealed by Statute Law Revision Act 1863 (26 & 27 Vict. c. 125))
Traitorous Words Act 1554 (repealed)	1 & 2 Ph. & M. c. 9	16 January 1555
An Act for the Punishment of Traiterous Words against the Queen. (Repealed by Statute Law Revision Act 1863 (26 & 27 Vict. c. 125))
Treason Act 1554 (repealed)	1 & 2 Ph. & M. c. 10	16 January 1555
An Act whereby certain Offences be made Treasons, and also for the Government of the King's and Queen's Majesties Issue. (Repealed by Criminal Law Act 1967 (c. 58))
Counterfeit Coin Act 1554 (repealed)	1 & 2 Ph. & M. c. 11	16 January 1555
An Act for the Punishment of bringing in of counterfeit Coin of Foreign Realms, being current within this Realm. (Repealed by Coinage Offences Act 1832 (2 & 3 Will. 4. c. 34))
Distress Act 1554 (repealed)	1 & 2 Ph. & M. c. 12	16 January 1555
An Act for the impounding of Distresses. (Repealed by Statute Law Revision Act 1863 (26 & 27 Vict. c. 125), Statute Law Revision Act 1888 (51 & 52 Vict. c. 3), Statute Law Revision Act 1948 (11 & 12 Geo. 6. c. 62) and Statute Law (Repeals) Act 1969 (c. 52))
Criminal Law Act 1554 (repealed)	1 & 2 Ph. & M. c. 13	16 January 1555
An Act, appointing an Order to Justices of Peace, for the Bailment of Prisoners. (Repealed by Criminal Law Act 1826 (7 Geo. 4. c. 64))
Worsteds (Norfolk) Act 1554 (repealed)	1 & 2 Ph. & M. c. 14	16 January 1555
An Act for the making of Russetts, Naples Fustians, and Sattins-Reversies, in Norwiche. (Repealed by Statute Law Revision Act 1863 (26 & 27 Vict. c. 125))
Lords Marches in Wales Act 1554 (repealed)	1 & 2 Ph. & M. c. 15	16 January 1555
An Act to confirm the Liberty of the Lords Marchers in Wales. (Repealed by Promissory Oaths Act 1871 (34 & 35 Vict. c. 48))
Continuance of Laws (No. 2) Act 1554 (repealed)	1 & 2 Ph. & M. c. 16	16 January 1555
An Act for the Continuance of certain Statutes. (Repealed by Statute Law Revision Act 1863 (26 & 27 Vict. c. 125))
Leases Act 1554 (repealed)	1 & 2 Ph. & M. c. 17	16 January 1555
An Act touching Leases hereafter to be made by Spiritual Persons. (Repealed by Statute Law Revision Act 1863 (26 & 27 Vict. c. 125))

=== Private acts ===
Short title	Citation	Royal assent
Long title
Reversal of the attainder of Cardinal Pole.	1 & 2 Ph. & M. c. 1 Pr.	22 November 1554
An Act for the Restitution in Blood of the Lord Cardinal Poole.
Reversal of the outlawries and attainders of Richard Pate, Bishop William Petow and others.	1 & 2 Ph. & M. c. 2 Pr.	16 January 1555
An Act for the Repealing of all Attainders and Outlawries had against Richard Pate, Bishop, William Peytowe, (Note: William Petow) and others.
Confirmation of attainders of Henry late Duke of Suffolk and others.	1 & 2 Ph. & M. c. 3 Pr.	16 January 1555
An Act for the Confirmation of the Attainder of the late Duke of Suffolke, and others.
Annexation of Bucknell to Salop.	1 & 2 Ph. & M. c. 4 Pr.	16 January 1555
An Act for the uniting of the Town of Bucknell to the County of Salop.

=== Sources ===
- "1° & 2° Phil. & Mar.". The Statutes of the Realm. Vol. 4 Part 1: 1547 to 1584. pp. 237–264 – via Internet Archive.
- "1° & 2° Phil. & Mar.". The Statutes of the Realm. Vol. 4 Part 1: 1547 to 1584. pp. 237–264 – via HathiTrust.
- "1° & 2° Phil. & Mar.". The Statutes of the Realm. Vol. 4 Part 1: 1547 to 1584. pp. 237–264 – via Google Books.
- Pickering, Danby, ed. (1763). "Anno primo & secundo Philippi & Mariæ". The Statutes at Large. Vol. 6: from the First Year of Queen Mary to the Thirty-fifth Year of Queen Elizabeth, inclusive. Cambridge: Joseph Bentham. pp. 25–66 – via Internet Archive.
- Pickering, Danby, ed. (1763). "Anno primo & secundo Philippi & Mariæ". The Statutes at Large. Vol. 6: from the First Year of Queen Mary to the Thirty-fifth Year of Queen Elizabeth, inclusive. Cambridge: Joseph Bentham. pp. 25–66 – via Internet Archive.
- Journal of the House of Commons. Vol. 1 – 1547-1629. His Majesty's Stationery Office. 1802 – via British History Online.
- Journal of the House of Lords. Vol. 1: 1509-1577. London: His Majesty's Stationery Office. 1830 – via British History Online.
- Chronological Table of and Index to the Statutes. Vol. 1: To the End of the Session 59 Vict. Sess. 2 (1895) (13th ed.). London: Her Majesty's Stationery Office. 1896. pp. 57–58 – via Google Books.
- Chronological Table of the Statutes: Covering the Period from 1235 to the End of 1971. London: Her Majesty's Stationery Office. 1972. p. 55. ISBN 978-0-11-840096-1 – via Google Books.
- "Chronological Tables of the Private and Personal Acts: Part 1 (1539–1601)". legislation.gov.uk. The National Archives.

== See also ==
- List of acts of the Parliament of England
