= Treason Act 1554 =

Act of the Parliament of England

Treason Act 1554 (Note: The citation of this act by this short title was authorised by section 5 of, and the second schedule to, the Statute Law Revision Act 1948. Due to the repeal of those provisions, it is now authorised by section 19(2) of the Interpretation Act 1978.)
- Act of Parliament
- Parliament of England
- Long title: An Acte wherby certayne Offences bee made Treasons; and also for the Government of the Kinges and Quenes Majesties Issue. (Note: These words are printed against this act in the second column of the second schedule to the Statute Law Revision Act 1948, which is headed "Title".)
- Citation: 1 & 2 Ph. & M. c. 10
- Territorial extent: England and Wales

Dates
- Royal assent: 16 January 1555
- Commencement: 1 February 1555 (Note: Section 2.)
- Repealed: 1 January 1968

Other legislation
- Amended by: Statute Law Revision Act 1863; Statute Law Revision Act 1888; Statute Law Revision Act 1948
- Repealed by: Criminal Law Act 1967
- Relates to: Treason Act 1351; Traitorous Words Act 1554; Counterfeit Coin Act 1554

Status: Repealed

Text of statute as originally enacted

The Treason Act 1554 (1 & 2 Ph. & M. c. 10) was an act of the Parliament of England. It is not to be confused with two other acts about treason passed in the same year, the Traitorous Words Act 1554 (c. 9) and Counterfeit Coin Act 1554 (c. 11) (summarised below).

== Provisions ==
=== Long title ===
The long title was "An Acte wherby certayne Offences bee made Treasons; and also for the Government of the Kinges and Quenes Majesties Issue."

=== Section 1 to 6 – Protection of King Philip ===
The act provided legal protection to King Philip, who had married Queen Mary I on 25 July 1554 and became co-monarch of England and Ireland. It became an offence to "compass or imagine to deprive the King's Majesty from the having with the Queen the style, honour and kingly name, or to destroy the King, or to levy war within this realm against the King or Queen," or to say that the King ought not to have his title. The penalty for a first offence was forfeiture of goods and "perpetual imprisonment". A second offence was high treason. However to "compass or imagine the death of the King" or to remove him from government was high treason on a first offence.

The act also declared that if Mary died and her heir was not yet 18 if male, or was under 15 and unmarried if female, then Philip would govern the realm until the heir to the throne came of age (or was married, if female). In that event, it would be treason to "compass, attempt, and go about to destroy the person of the King, or to remove his Highness from the government".

=== Section 7 – Procedure ===
Section 7 of the act required trials for "any treason" (not just treason under this act) to be conducted in accordance with the common law, "and not otherwise".

=== Section 8 – Misprision of treason ===
Section 8 of the act provided that the concealment or keeping secret of treason constituted misprision of treason but not treason:

Provided always, and be it declared and enacted by the authority aforesaid, that concealment or keeping secret of any high treason be deemed and taken only misprision of treason, and the offenders therein to forfeit and suffer, as in cases of misprision of treason hath heretofore been used; any thing above mentioned to the contrary notwithstanding.

=== Sections 9 to 12 – Further procedure ===
Section 9 of the act preserved privilege of peerage — the right of peers of the realm to be tried by their peers. Section 10 stipulated that offences against the Act which were committed "only by preaching or words" must be prosecuted within six months.

Section 11 of the act created a new rule of evidence for cases of treason under the act (but not other treasons). It required all of the witnesses against the defendant (or at least two of them) to attend court to give evidence against him in person, "if living and within the realm". (The rule did not apply if the defendant pleaded guilty.) Different versions of this two witnesses rule were adopted in the Sedition Act 1661 (13 Cha. 2 St. 1. c. 1), the Treason Act 1695, and eventually in Article Three of the United States Constitution. The rule was first enacted in the Treason Act 1547.

Section 12 of the act made similar provision to section 7.

=== Section 13 – Accessories ===
Section 13 of the act provided the rule for how accessories were to be treated for aiding and abetting a crime for which the penalty depended on whether it was the defendant's first or second offence. An accessory was to receive the same penalty as the principal offender, regardless of whether the accessory had committed the offence before.

== Subsequent developments ==
Treason Act 1556
- Act of Parliament
- Parliament of Ireland
- Long title: An Act whereby certein Offences be made Treasons; and also for the Government of the King and Queen's Majestie's Issue.
- Citation: 3 & 4 Phil. & Mar. c. 11 (I)
- Territorial extent: Ireland

Dates
- Royal assent: 1556
- Commencement: 1556

The act was adopted by the Parliament of Ireland as the Treason Act 1556 (3 & 4 Phil. & Mar. c. 11 (I)).

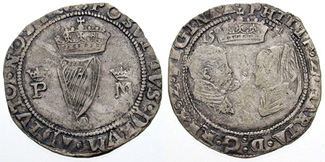
Irish groat of 1557 depicting Philip and Mary as joint monarchs

The whole act, except sections 6 and 8, was repealed by section 1 of, and the schedule to, the Statute Law Revision Act 1863 (26 & 27 Vict. c. 125), which came into force on 28 July 1863.

The words in the long title of the act from "and also" were repealed by section 1 of, and the first schedule to, the Statute Law Revision Act 1948 (11 & 12 Geo. 6. c. 62), which came into force on 30 July 1948.

The whole act was repealed by section 10(2) of, and part I of schedule 3 to, the Criminal Law Act 1967, which came into force on 1 January 1968.

== Other treason legislation in 1554 ==
Traitorous Words Act 1554
- Act of Parliament
- Parliament of England
- Long title: An Act for the Punishment of Traiterous Words against the Queen.
- Citation: 1 & 2 Ph. & M. c. 9
- Territorial extent: England and Wales

Dates
- Royal assent: 16 January 1555
- Commencement: 12 November 1554 (Note: Start of session.)
- Repealed: 28 July 1863

Other legislation
- Repealed by: Statute Law Revision Act 1863
- Relates to: Counterfeit Coin Act 1554

Status: Repealed

Text of statute as originally enacted

Counterfeit Coin Act 1554
- Act of Parliament
- Parliament of England
- Long title: An Act for the Punishment of bringing in of counterfeit Coin of Foreign Realms, being current within this Realm.
- Citation: 1 & 2 Ph. & M. c. 11
- Territorial extent: England and Wales

Dates
- Royal assent: 16 January 1555
- Commencement: 20 January 1555 (Note: Section 1.)
- Repealed: 1 May 1832

Other legislation
- Repealed by: Coinage Offences Act 1832
- Relates to: Treason Act 1547

Status: Repealed

Text of statute as originally enacted

Two other acts concerning treason were passed in 1554, the Traitorous Words Act 1554 (1 & 2 Ph. & M. c. 9) and Counterfeit Coin Act 1554 (c. 11).

The former made it treason to "pray or desire that God will shorten the Queen's days". The latter made it treason to import counterfeit coins and returned the rules of evidence to what they had been before the Treason Act 1547 (1 Edw. 6. c. 12).

== See also ==
- High treason in the United Kingdom
- Treason Act
