= Louis Montrose =

American photographer and literary theorist

Louis Adrian Montrose was an American literary theorist and academic scholar who retired from the academy in 2010 to pursue a career as a photographer. His scholarship addressed a wide variety of literary, historical, and theoretical topics and issues, and significantly shaped contemporary studies of Renaissance poetics, English Renaissance theatre, and Elizabeth I. Montrose was an influential early proponent of New Historicism, especially as it applied to the study of early modern English literature and culture. He was a professor of English Literature at the University of California, San Diego.
