= Queen Regent's Prerogative Act 1554 =

Act of the Parliament of England

Queen Regent's Prerogative Act 1554 (Note: The citation of this act by this short title was authorised by section 5 of, and the second schedule to, the Statute Law Revision Act 1948. Due to the repeal of those provisions, it is now authorised by section 19(2) of the Interpretation Act 1978.)
- Act of Parliament
- Parliament of England
- Long title: An Acte declaring that the Regall Power of this Realme is in the Quenes Majestie as fully and absolutely as ever it was in any of her moste noble Progenitours Kinges of this Realme. (Note: These words are printed against this act in the second column of the second schedule to the Statute Law Revision Act 1948, which is headed "Title".)
- Citation: 1 Mar. Sess. 3 c. 1
- Territorial extent: England and Wales

Dates
- Royal assent: 5 May 1554
- Commencement: 2 April 1554 (Note: Start of session.)
- Repealed: 1 January 1970
Other legislation
| Repealed by | Statute Law (Repeals) Act 1969 |

Status: Repealed

Text of statute as originally enacted

The Queen Regent's Prerogative Act 1554 (1 Mar. Sess. 3 c. 1) was an act of the Parliament of England.

The act gave a queen regnant the same powers as a king.

== Subsequent developments ==
The whole act was repealed by section 1 of, and part I of the schedule to, the Statute Law (Repeals) Act 1969, which came into force on 1 January 1970.
