= Henrician Reformation =

16th-century religious events during reign of English King Henry VIII

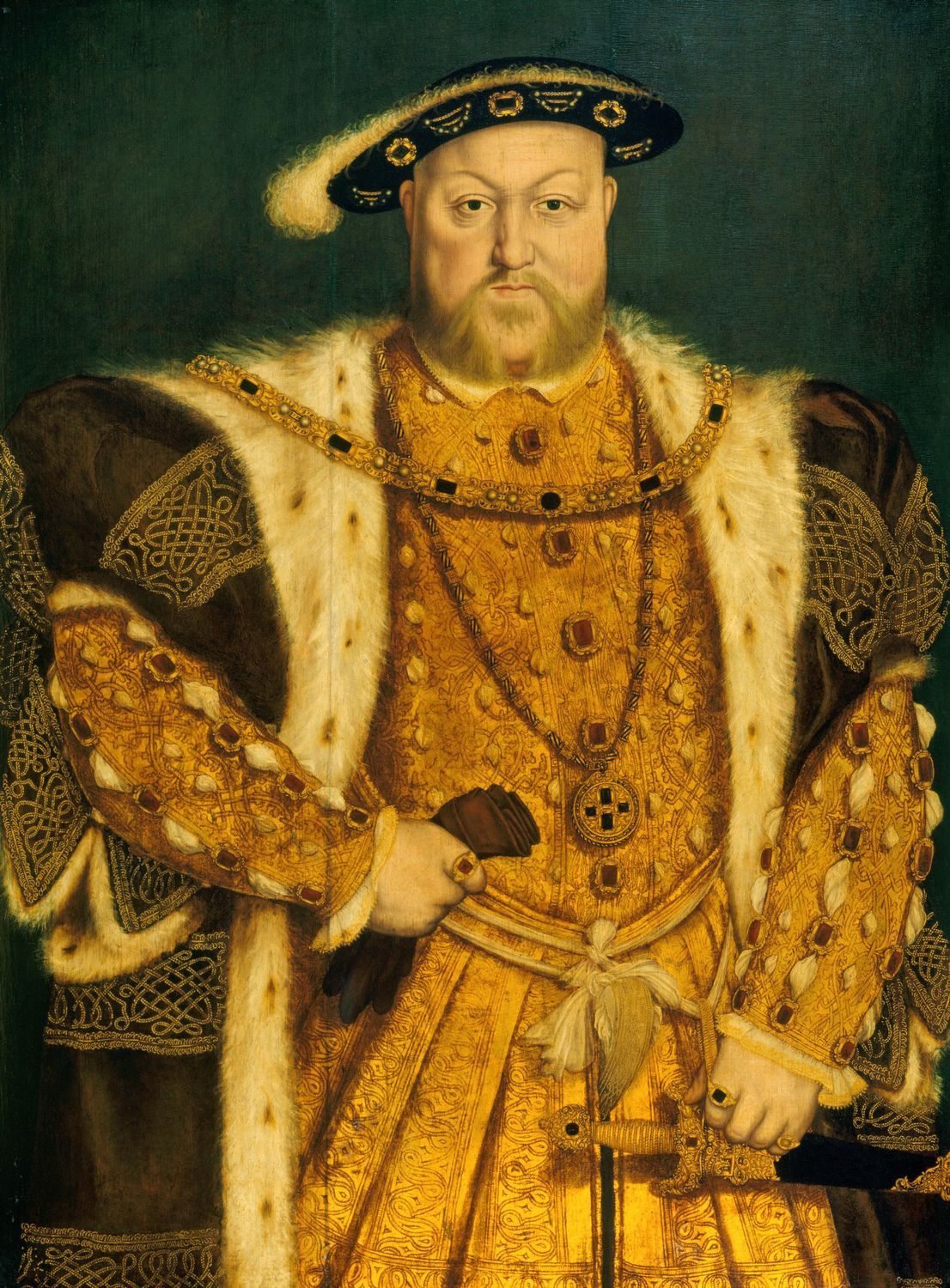
King Henry VIII initiated the separation of the English Church from the Catholic Church by declaring himself, not the Pope, the Supreme Head of the Church of England. Portrait by Hans Holbein the Younger. Thyssen-Bornemisza Museum, Madrid.

The Henrician Reformation was the first phase of the English Reformation. It is named for King Henry VIII of England who, between around 1527 to 1547, took a series of measures to take matrimonial, political and spiritual authority away from the Pope and Catholic bishops in favour of himself. The Church of England was separated from the Catholic Church, and the king was declared Supreme Head of the Church of England. Henry also oversaw the dissolution of the monasteries and the confiscation of considerable property and wealth that had belonged to the church.

== Background ==
Henry VIII acceded to the English throne in 1509 at the age of 17. He made a dynastic marriage with Catherine of Aragon, the widow of his brother Arthur, in June 1509, just before his coronation on Midsummer's Day. Unlike his father, who was secretive and conservative, young Henry appeared the epitome of chivalry and sociability. An observant Catholic, he heard up to five masses a day (except during the hunting-season).

As with many of his contemporary monarchs, Henry felt his prerogatives were not recognised or were threatened by the Popes, and vice versa. In the period 1513 to 1519, he contended with Pope Leo X to remove the bishop of Tournai, the region of modern-day Belgium which Henry had then personally conquered, and developed increasingly imperialist and absolutist justifications. (Note: Historian T. F. Mayer reads Henry's correspondence with the Pope as including a direct threat to assassinate the Pope, if he did not respect Henry's sovereignty.)

== Annulment controversy ==
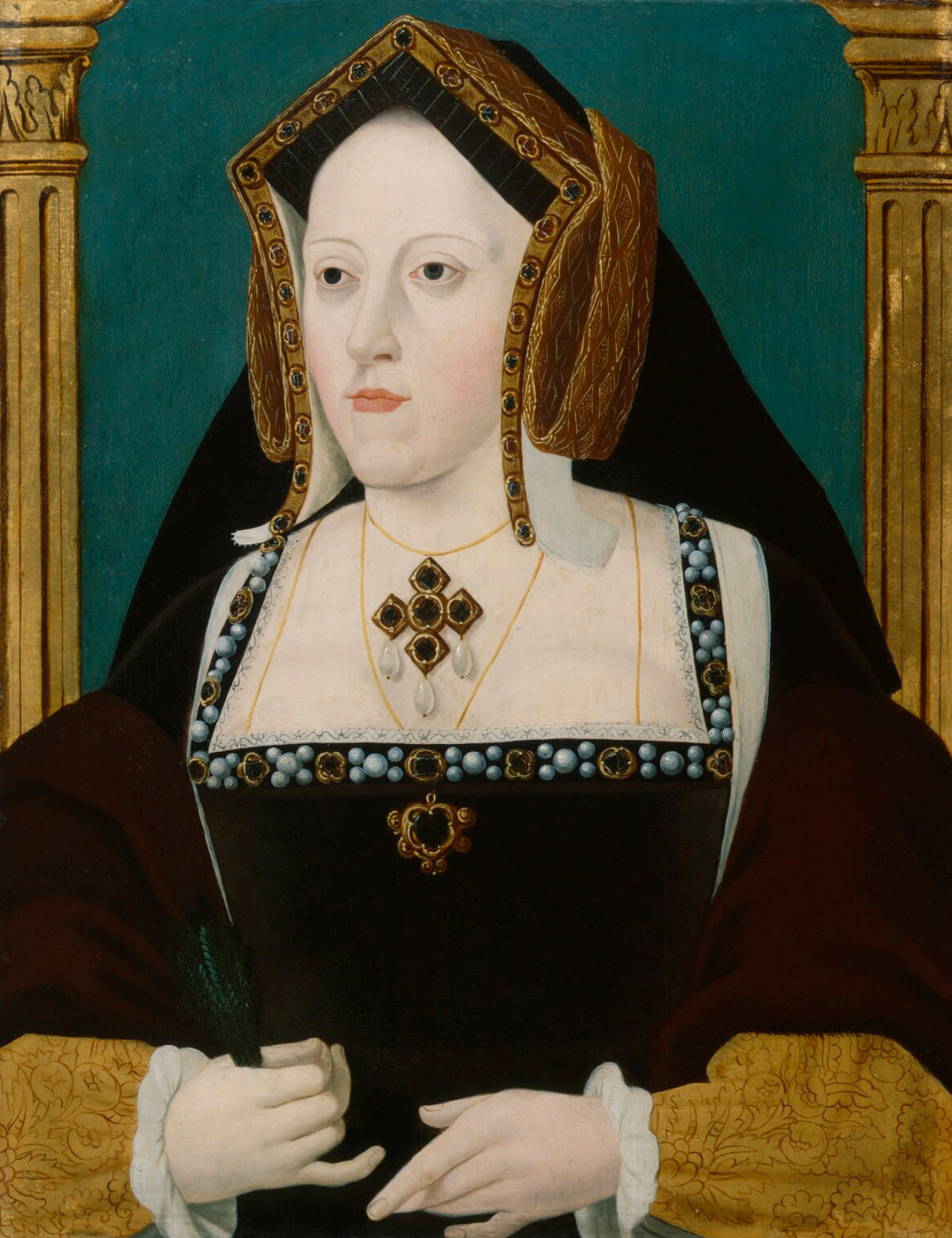
Catherine of Aragon, Henry VIII's first wife. Attributed to Joannes Corvus, National Portrait Gallery, London.

Henry was regarded as having a "powerful but unoriginal mind"; he let himself be influenced by his advisors, from whom he was never apart, by night or day. He was thus susceptible to whoever had his ear. (Note: Brigden (2000, p. 103) writes, "He ... believed he that he could keep his own secrets ... but he was often deceived and he deceived himself.")

This contributed to a state of hostility between his young contemporaries and the Lord Chancellor, Cardinal Thomas Wolsey. As long as Wolsey had his ear, Henry's Catholicism was secure: in 1521, he had defended the Catholic Church from Martin Luther's accusations of heresy in a book he wrote—probably with considerable help from the conservative Bishop of Rochester John Fisher—entitled The Defence of the Seven Sacraments, for which he was awarded the title "Defender of the Faith" (Fidei Defensor) by Pope Leo X. (Successive English and British monarchs have retained this title to the present, even after the Anglican Church broke away from Catholicism, in part because the title was re-conferred by Parliament in 1544, after the split.) Wolsey's enemies at court included those who had been influenced by Lutheran ideas, among whom was attractive, charismatic Anne Boleyn.

Anne arrived at court in 1522 as maid of honour to Queen Catherine, having spent some years in France being educated by Queen Claude. She was a woman of "charm, style and wit, with will and savagery which made her a match for Henry". (Note: Brigden (2000, p. 111) notes that Anne's music book contained an illustration of a falcon pecking at a pomegranate: the falcon was her badge, the pomegranate, that of Granada, Catherine's badge.) Anne was a distinguished French conversationalist, singer, and dancer. She was cultured and is the disputed author of several songs and poems. By 1527, Henry wanted his marriage to Catherine annulled. (Note: According to Marshall (2017, p. 164), "Henry wanted an annulment—a formal and legal declaration of the marriage's invalidity. Yet the word contemporaries used, divorce, captures better the legal and emotional turmoil.") She had not produced a male heir who survived longer than two months, and Henry wanted a son to secure the Tudor dynasty. Before Henry's father (Henry VII) acceded to the throne, England had been beset by civil warfare over rival claims to the English crown. Henry wanted to avoid a similar uncertainty over the succession. Catherine of Aragon's only surviving child was Princess Mary.

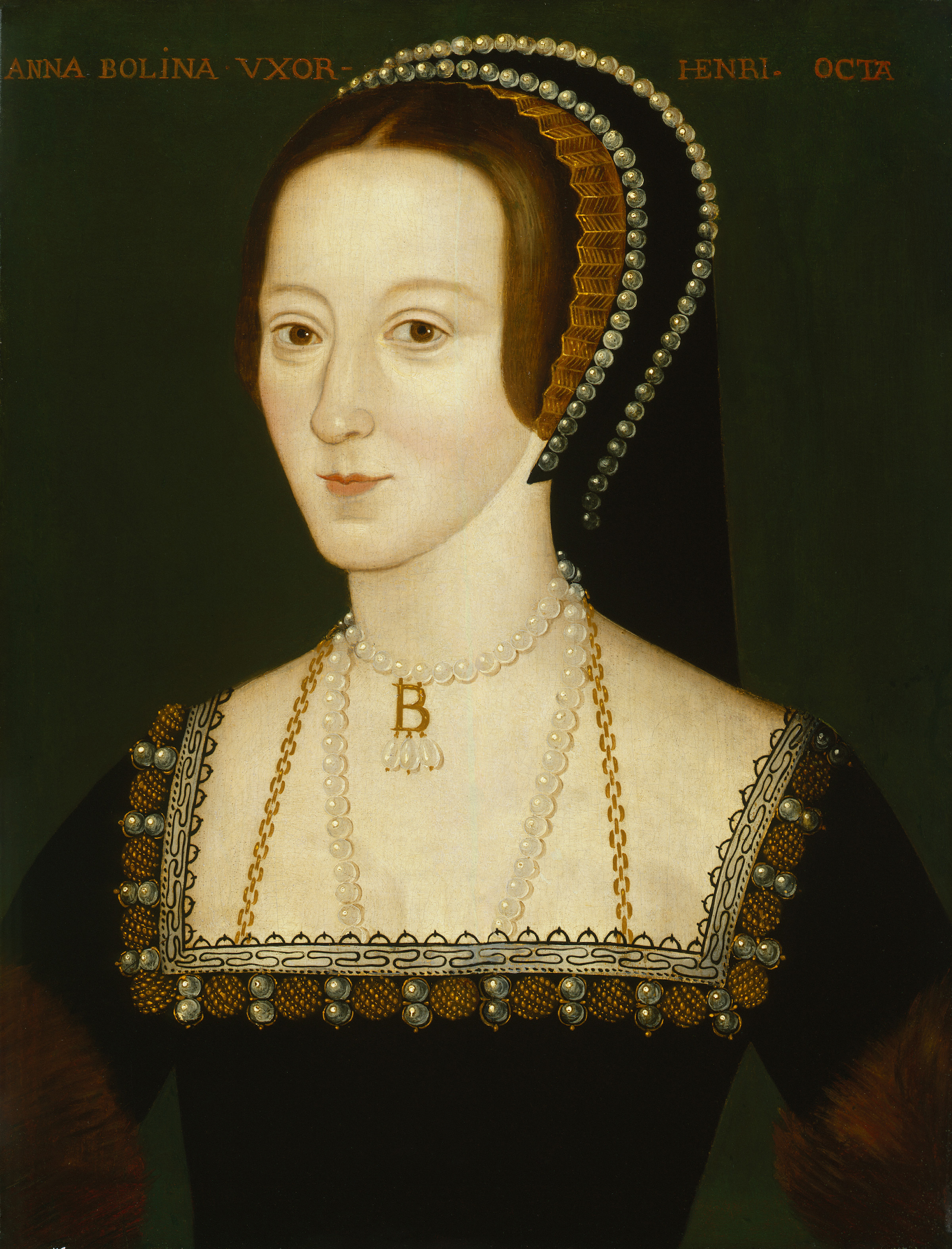
Anne Boleyn, Henry VIII's second wife, by an unknown artist. National Portrait Gallery, London.

Henry claimed that this lack of a male heir was because his marriage was "blighted in the eyes of God". Catherine had been his late brother's wife, and it was therefore against biblical teachings for Henry to have married her (Leviticus 20:21); a special dispensation from Pope Julius II had been needed to allow the wedding in the first place. Henry argued the marriage was never valid because the biblical prohibition was part of unbreakable divine law, and even popes could not dispense with it. (Note: Marshall (2017, pp. 166–167) points out that "[i]nconveniently for Henry, another Old Testament verse (Deut. 25:5) seemingly qualified the Levitical prohibition, commanding a man to take to wife his deceased brother's widow, if there had been no child.") In 1527, Henry asked Pope Clement VII to annul the marriage, but the Pope refused. According to canon law, the Pope could not annul a marriage on the basis of a canonical impediment previously dispensed. Clement also feared the wrath of Catherine's nephew, Holy Roman Emperor Charles V, whose troops earlier that year had sacked Rome and briefly taken the Pope prisoner.

The combination of Henry's "scruple of conscience" and his captivation by Anne Boleyn made his desire to rid himself of his queen compelling. The indictment of his chancellor Cardinal Wolsey in 1529 for praemunire (taking the authority of the papacy above the Crown) and Wolsey's subsequent death in November 1530 on his way to London to answer a charge of high treason left Henry open to both the influences of the supporters of the queen and the opposing influences of those who sanctioned the abandonment of the Roman allegiance, for whom an annulment was but an opportunity.

== Actions against clergy ==
In 1529 Henry summoned the Parliament of England to deal with the annulment and other grievances against the church. The Catholic Church was a powerful institution in England with a number of privileges. The King could not tax or sue clergy in civil courts. The church could also grant fugitives sanctuary, and many areas of the law—such as family law—were controlled by the church. For centuries, kings had attempted to reduce the church's power, and the English Reformation was a continuation of this power struggle.

The Reformation Parliament sat from 1529 to 1536 and brought together those who wanted reform but who disagreed what form it should take. There were common lawyers who resented the privileges of the clergy to summon laity to their ecclesiastical courts, and there were those who had been influenced by Lutheranism and were hostile to the theology of Rome. Henry's chancellor, Thomas More, successor to Wolsey, also wanted reform: he wanted new laws against heresy. The lawyer and member of Parliament Thomas Cromwell saw how Parliament could be used to advance royal supremacy over the church and further Protestant beliefs.

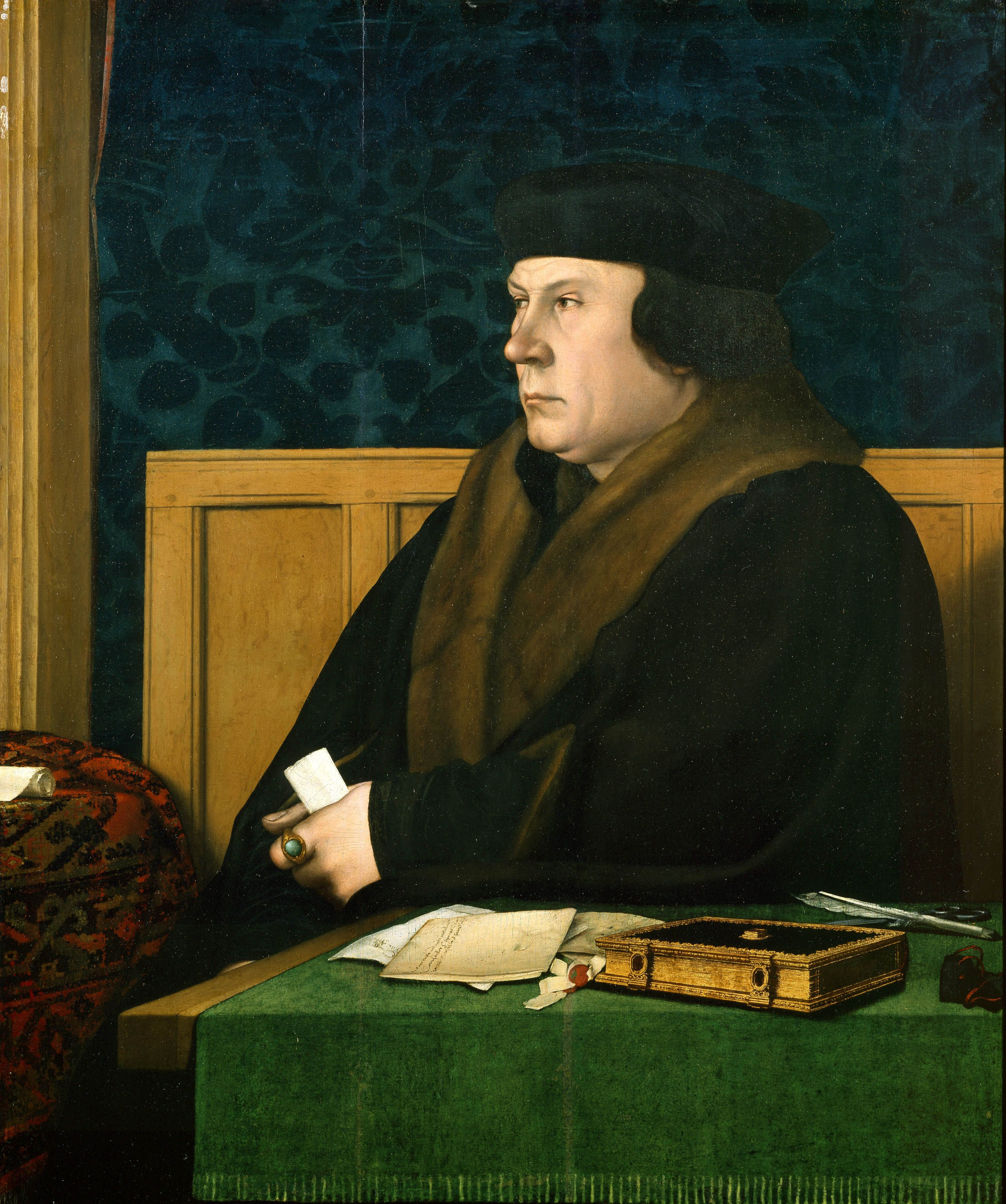
Thomas Cromwell, 1st Earl of Essex (c. 1485–1540), Henry VIII's chief minister (1532–1540).

Initially, Parliament passed minor legislation to control ecclesiastical fees, clerical pluralism, and sanctuary. In the matter of the annulment, no progress seemed possible. The Pope seemed more afraid of Emperor Charles V than of Henry. Anne, Cromwell and their allies wished simply to ignore the Pope, but in October 1530 a meeting of clergy and lawyers advised that Parliament could not empower the Archbishop of Canterbury to act against the Pope's prohibition. Henry thus resolved to bully the priests.

Having first charged eight bishops and seven other clerics with praemunire, the King decided in 1530 to proceed against the whole clergy for violating the 1392 Statute of Praemunire, which forbade obedience to the Pope or any foreign ruler. Henry wanted the clergy of Canterbury province to pay £100,000 for their pardon; this was a sum equal to the Crown's annual income. This was agreed by the Convocation of Canterbury on 24 January 1531. It wanted the payment spread over five years, but Henry refused. The convocation responded by withdrawing their payment altogether and demanded that Henry should fulfil certain guarantees before they would give him the money. Henry refused these conditions, agreeing only to the five-year period of payment. On 7 February, Convocation was asked to agree to five articles that specified that:

1. The clergy should recognise Henry as the "sole protector and supreme head of the English Church and clergy"
2. The King was responsible for the souls of his subjects
3. The privileges of the church were upheld only if they did not detract from the royal prerogative and the laws of the realm
4. The King pardoned the clergy for violating the Statute of Praemunire
5. The laity were also pardoned.

In Parliament, Bishop Fisher championed Catherine and the clergy, inserting into the first article the phrase "as far as the word of God allows". On 11 February, William Warham, Archbishop of Canterbury, presented the revised wording to Convocation. The clergy were to acknowledge the King to be "singular protector, supreme lord and even, so far as the law of Christ allows, supreme head of the English Church and clergy". When Warham requested a discussion, there was silence. Warham then said, "He who is silent seems to consent", to which a bishop responded, "Then we are all silent." The Convocation granted consent to the King's five articles and the payment on 8 March 1531. Later, the Convocation of York agreed to the same on behalf of the clergy of York province. That same year, Parliament passed the Pardon to Clergy Act 1531.

By 1532, Cromwell was responsible for managing government business in the House of Commons. He authored and presented to the Commons the Supplication against the Ordinaries, which was a list of grievances against the bishops, including abuses of power and Convocation's independent legislative authority. After passing the Commons, the Supplication was presented to the King as a petition for reform on 18 March. On 26 March, the Act in Conditional Restraint of Annates mandated the clergy pay no more than five percent of their first year's revenue (annates) to Rome.

On 10 May, the King demanded of Convocation that the church renounce all authority to make laws. On 15 May, Convocation renounced its authority to make canon law without royal assent—the so called Submission of the Clergy. (Parliament subsequently gave this statutory force with the Submission of the Clergy Act.) The next day, More resigned as lord chancellor. This left Cromwell as Henry's chief minister. (Cromwell never became chancellor. His power came—and was lost—through his informal relations with Henry.)

== Separation from Rome ==
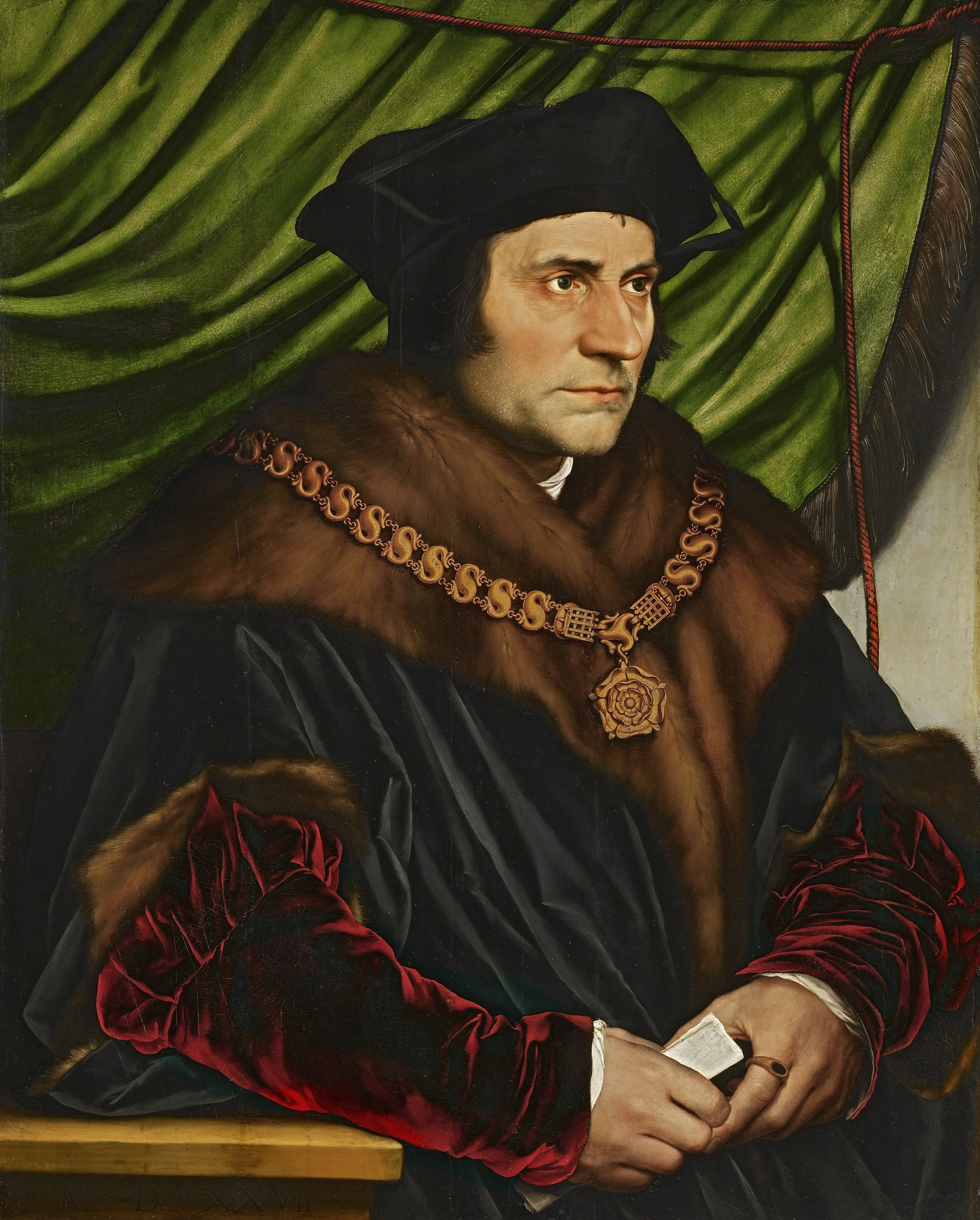
Thomas More, with John Fisher the leader of political resistance against the break with Rome. Both were executed in 1535.

Archbishop Warham died in August 1532. Henry wanted Thomas Cranmer—a Protestant who could be relied on to oppose the papacy—to replace him. The Pope reluctantly approved Cranmer's appointment, and he was consecrated on 30 March 1533. By this time, Henry was secretly married to Anne, who was pregnant. The impending birth of an heir gave new urgency to annulling his marriage to Catherine. Nevertheless, a decision continued to be delayed because Rome was the final authority in all ecclesiastical matters. To address this issue, Parliament passed the Act in Restraint of Appeals, which outlawed appeals to Rome on ecclesiastical matters and declared that

This realm of England is an Empire, and so hath been accepted in the world, governed by one Supreme Head and King having the dignity and royal estate of the Imperial Crown of the same, unto whom a body politic compact of all sorts and degrees of people divided in terms and by names of Spirituality and Temporality, be bounden and owe to bear next to God a natural and humble obedience.

This declared England an independent country in every respect. English historian Geoffrey Elton called this act an "essential ingredient" of the "Tudor revolution" in that it expounded a theory of national sovereignty. Cranmer was now able to grant an annulment of the marriage to Catherine as Henry required, pronouncing on 23 May the judgment that Henry's marriage with Catherine was against the law of God. The Pope responded by excommunicating Henry on 11 July 1533. Anne gave birth to a daughter, Princess Elizabeth, on 7 September 1533.

In 1534, Parliament took further action to limit papal authority in England. A new Heresy Act ensured that no one could be punished for speaking against the Pope and also made it more difficult to convict someone of heresy; however, sacramentarians and Anabaptists continued to be vigorously persecuted.

Those who held Protestant sympathies remained a religious minority until political events intervened. As heretics in the eyes of church and state, early Protestants were persecuted. Between 1530 and 1533, Thomas Hitton (England's first Protestant martyr), Thomas Bilney, Richard Bayfield, John Tewkesbury, James Bainham, Thomas Benet, Thomas Harding, John Frith, and Andrew Hewet were burned to death. William Tracy was posthumously convicted of heresy for denying purgatory and affirming justification by faith, and his corpse was disinterred and burned.

The Act in Absolute Restraint of Annates outlawed all annates to Rome and also ordered that if cathedrals refused the King's nomination for bishop, they would be liable to punishment by praemunire. The Act of First Fruits and Tenths transferred the taxes on ecclesiastical income from the Pope to the Crown. The Act Concerning Peter's Pence and Dispensations outlawed the annual payment by landowners of Peter's Pence to the Pope, and transferred the power to grant dispensations and licences from the Pope to the Archbishop of Canterbury. This Act also reiterated that England had "no superior under God, but only your Grace" and that Henry's "imperial crown" had been diminished by "the unreasonable and uncharitable usurpations and exactions" of the Pope.

The First Act of Supremacy made Henry Supreme Head of the Church of England and disregarded any "usage, custom, foreign laws, foreign authority [or] prescription". In case this should be resisted, Parliament passed the Treasons Act 1534, which made it high treason punishable by death to deny royal supremacy. The following year, Thomas More and John Fisher were executed under this legislation. Finally, in 1536, Parliament passed the Act against the Pope's Authority, which removed the last part of papal authority still legal. This was Rome's power in England to decide disputes concerning Scripture.

== Moderate religious reform ==
The break with Rome gave Henry the power to administer the English Church, tax it, appoint its officials, and control its laws. It also gave him control over the church's doctrine and ritual. While Henry remained a traditional Catholic, his most important supporters in breaking with Rome were the Protestants. Yet, not all of his supporters were Protestants. Some were traditionalists, such as Stephen Gardiner, opposed to the new theology but felt papal supremacy was not essential to the Church of England's identity. The King relied on Protestants, such as Thomas Cromwell and Thomas Cranmer, to carry out his religious programme and embraced the language of the continental Reformation, while maintaining a middle way between religious extremes. What followed was a period of doctrinal confusion as both conservatives and reformers attempted to shape the church's future direction.

The reformers were aided by Cromwell, who in January 1535 was made vicegerent in spirituals. Effectively the King's vicar general, Cromwell's authority was greater than that of bishops, even the Archbishop of Canterbury. Largely due to Anne Boleyn's influence, a number of Protestants were appointed bishops between 1534 and 1536. These included Latimer, Thomas Goodrich, John Salcot, Nicholas Shaxton, William Barlow, John Hilsey, and Edward Foxe. During the same period, the most influential conservative bishop, Stephen Gardiner, was sent to France on a diplomatic mission and thus removed from an active role in English politics for three years.

Cromwell's programme, assisted by Anne Boleyn's influence over episcopal appointments, was not merely against the clergy and the power of Rome. He persuaded Henry that safety from political alliances that Rome might attempt to bring together lay in negotiations with the German Lutheran princes of the Schmalkaldic League. (Note: According to Brigden (2000, p. 107), Henry was no innocent: he sought influence in European affairs and, in pursuance of it, his relationship with the French was ambivalent and essentially treacherous.) There also seemed to be a possibility that Emperor Charles V might act to avenge his rejected aunt (Queen Catherine) and enforce the Pope's excommunication. The negotiations did not lead to an alliance but did bring Lutheran ideas to England.

In 1536, Convocation adopted the first doctrinal statement for the Church of England, the Ten Articles. This was followed by the Bishops' Book in 1537. These established a semi-Lutheran doctrine for the church. Justification by faith, qualified by an emphasis on good works following justification, was a core teaching. The traditional seven sacraments were reduced to three only—baptism, Eucharist and penance. Catholic teaching on praying to saints, purgatory and the use of images in worship was undermined.

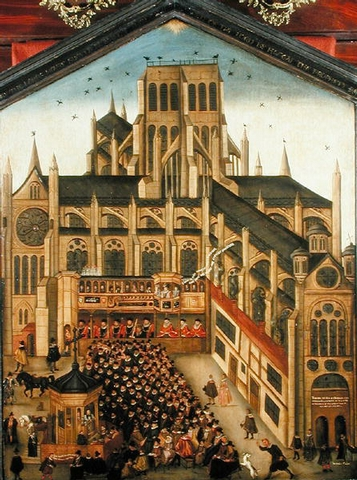
St Paul's Cross (in the lower left corner of the painting) was a prominent preaching cross on the grounds of Old St Paul's Cathedral.

In August 1536, the same month the Ten Articles were published, Cromwell issued a set of Royal Injunctions to the clergy. Minor feast days were changed into normal work days, including those celebrating a church's patron saint and most feasts during harvest time (July through September). The rationale was partly economic as too many holidays led to a loss of productivity and were "the occasion of vice and idleness". In addition, Protestants considered feast days to be examples of superstition. Clergy were to discourage pilgrimages and instruct the people to give to the poor rather than make offerings to images. The clergy were also ordered to place Bibles in both English and Latin in every church for the people to read. This last requirement was largely ignored by the bishops for a year or more due to the lack of any authorised English translation. The only complete vernacular version was the Coverdale Bible finished in 1535 and based on Tyndale's earlier work. It lacked royal approval, however.

The historian Diarmaid MacCulloch in his study of The Later Reformation in England, 1547–1603 argues that after 1537, "England's Reformation was characterized by its hatred of images, as Margaret Aston's work on iconoclasm and iconophobia has repeatedly and eloquently demonstrated." In February 1538, the famous Rood of Grace was condemned as a mechanical fraud and destroyed at St Paul's Cross. In July, the statues of Our Lady of Walsingham, Our Lady of Ipswich, and other Marian images were burned at Chelsea on Cromwell's orders. In September, Cromwell issued a second set of royal injunctions ordering the destruction of images to which pilgrimage offerings were made, the prohibition of lighting votive candles before images of saints, and the preaching of sermons against the veneration of images and relics. Afterwards, the shrine and bones of Thomas Becket, considered by many to have been martyred in defence of the church's liberties, were destroyed at Canterbury Cathedral.

== Dissolution of the monasteries ==
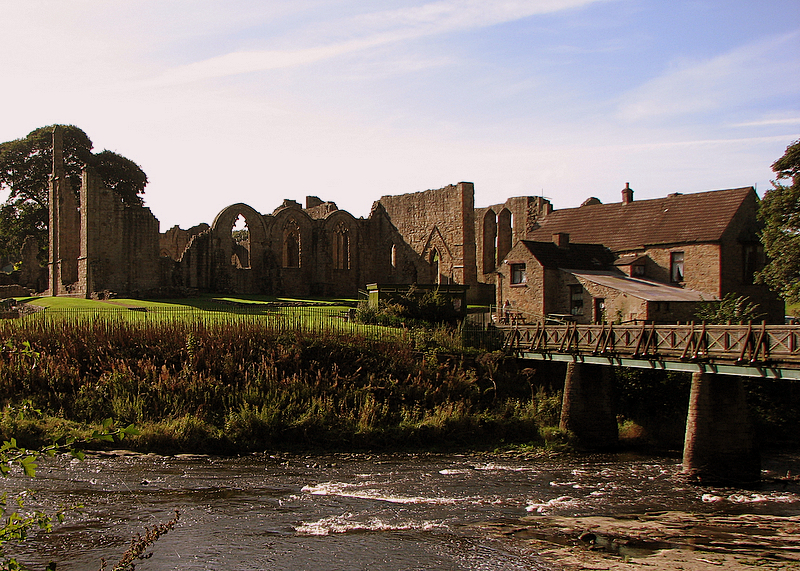
Remains of Finchale Priory, a Benedictine monastery near Durham that was closed in 1535

For Cromwell and Cranmer, a step in the Protestant agenda was attacking monasticism, which was associated with the doctrine of purgatory. One of the primary functions of monasteries was to pray for the souls of their benefactors and for the souls of all Christians. While the King was not opposed to religious houses on theological grounds, there was concern over the loyalty of the monastic orders, which were international in character and resistant to the Royal Supremacy. The Franciscan Observant houses were closed in August 1534 after that order refused to repudiate papal authority. Between 1535 and 1537, 18 Carthusians were killed for doing the same.

The Crown was also experiencing financial difficulties, and the wealth of the church, in contrast to its political weakness, made confiscation of church property both tempting and feasible. Seizure of monastic wealth was not unprecedented; it had happened before in 1295, 1337, and 1369. The church owned between one-fifth and one-third of the land in all England; Cromwell realised that he could bind the gentry and nobility to Royal Supremacy by selling to them the huge amount of church lands, and that any reversion to pre-Royal Supremacy would entail upsetting many of the powerful people in the realm.

In 1534, Cromwell initiated a visitation of the monasteries ostensibly to examine their character, but in fact, to value their assets with a view to expropriation. The visiting commissioners claimed to have uncovered sexual immorality and financial impropriety amongst the monks and nuns, which became the ostensible justification for their suppression. There were also reports of the possession and display of false relics, such as Hailes Abbey's vial of the Holy Blood, upon investigation announced to be "honey clarified and coloured with saffron". The Compendium Competorum compiled by the visitors documented ten pieces of the True Cross, seven portions of the Virgin Mary's milk and numerous saints' girdles.

Leading reformers, led by Anne Boleyn, wanted to convert monasteries into "places of study and good letters, and to the continual relief of the poor", but this was not done. In 1536, the Dissolution of the Lesser Monasteries Act closed smaller houses valued at less than £200 a year. Henry used the revenue to help build coastal defences (see Device Forts) against expected invasion, and all the land was given to the Crown or sold to the aristocracy. Thirty-four houses were saved by paying for exemptions. Monks and nuns affected by closures were transferred to larger houses, and monks had the option of becoming secular clergy.

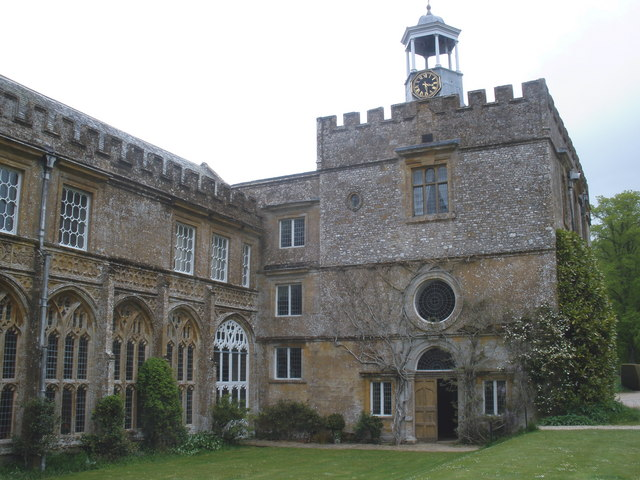
The chapter house of Forde Abbey, a Cistercian monastery closed in 1539 and converted into a country house

=== Civil unrest ===
The Royal Supremacy and the abolition of papal authority had not caused widespread unrest, but the attacks on monasteries and the abolition of saints' days and pilgrimages provoked violence. Mobs attacked those sent to break up monastic buildings. Suppression commissioners were attacked by local people in several places. In Northern England, there were a series of uprisings against the dissolutions in late 1536 and early 1537. The Lincolnshire Rising occurred in October 1536 and culminated in a force of 40,000 rebels assembling at Lincoln. They demanded an end to taxation during peacetime, the repeal of the statute of uses, an end to the suppression of monasteries, and that heresy be purged and heretics punished. Henry refused to negotiate, and the revolt collapsed as the nervous gentry convinced the common people to disperse.

The Pilgrimage of Grace was a more serious matter. The pro-Catholic, anti-land-tax revolt began in October at Yorkshire and spread to the other northern counties. Around 50,000 strong, the rebels under Robert Aske's leadership restored 16 of the 26 northern monasteries that had been dissolved. Due to the size of the rebellion, the King was persuaded to negotiate. In December, Thomas Howard, 3rd Duke of Norfolk, offered the rebels a pardon and a parliament to consider their grievances. Aske then sent the rebels home. The promises made to them, however, were ignored by the King, and Norfolk was instructed to put the rebellion down. Forty-seven of the Lincolnshire rebels were executed, and 132 from the Pilgrimage of Grace. In Southern England, smaller disturbances took place in Cornwall and Walsingham in 1537.

=== Closure of all houses ===
The failure of the Pilgrimage of Grace only sped up the process of dissolution and may have convinced Henry VIII that all religious houses needed to be closed. In 1540, the last monasteries were dissolved, wiping out an important element of traditional religion. Former monks were given modest pensions from the Court of Augmentations, and those that could sought work as parish priests. Former nuns received smaller pensions and, as they were still bound by vows of chastity, forbidden to marry. Henry personally devised a plan to form at least thirteen new dioceses so that most counties had one based on a former monastery (or more than one), though this scheme was only partly carried out. New dioceses were established at Bristol, Gloucester, Oxford, Peterborough, Westminster and Chester, but not, for instance, at Shrewsbury, Leicester or Waltham.

According to the political historian Gregory Slysz, "The dissolution of the monasteries [...] brought social catastrophe to England" for the next 50 or so years, due to the closure of the numerous associated urban almshouses for poor relief and hospitals, worsened by spiraling inflation and a doubling of the population.

== Reforms reversed ==
According to the historian Peter Marshall, Henry's religious reforms were based on the principles of "unity, obedience and the refurbishment of ancient truth". Yet, the outcome was disunity and disobedience. Impatient Protestants took it upon themselves to further reform. Priests said Mass in English rather than Latin and were marrying in violation of clerical celibacy. Not only were there divisions between traditionalists and reformers, but Protestants themselves were divided between establishment reformers who held Lutheran beliefs and radicals who held Anabaptist and Sacramentarian views. Reports of dissension from every part of England reached Cromwell daily—developments he tried to hide from the King.

In September 1538 Stephen Gardiner returned to England, and the official religious policy began to drift in a conservative direction. This was due in part to the eagerness of establishment Protestants to disassociate themselves from religious radicals. In September, two Lutheran princes, the Elector of Saxony and Landgrave of Hesse, sent warnings of Anabaptist activity in England. A commission was swiftly created to seek out Anabaptists. Henry personally presided at the trial of John Lambert in November 1538 for denying the real presence of Christ in the Eucharist. At the same time, he shared in the drafting of a proclamation ordering Anabaptists and Sacramentaries to get out of the country or face death. Discussion of the real presence (except by those educated in the universities) was forbidden, and priests who married were to be dismissed.

It was becoming clear that the King's views on religion differed from those of Cromwell and Cranmer. Henry made his traditional preferences known during the Easter Triduum of 1539, where he crept to the cross on Good Friday. Later that year, Parliament passed the Six Articles reaffirming the Catholic beliefs and practices such as transubstantiation, clerical celibacy, confession to a priest, votive masses, and withholding communion wine from the laity.

On 28 July 1540 Cromwell, Henry's longtime advisor and loyal servant, was then executed. Different reasons were advanced: that Cromwell would not enforce the Act of Six Articles; that he had supported Robert Barnes, Hugh Latimer and other heretics; and that he was responsible for Henry's marriage to Anne of Cleves, his fourth wife. Many other arrests under the Act followed. On the 30 July, the reformers Barnes, William Jerome and Thomas Gerrard were burned at the stake. In a display of religious impartiality, Thomas Abell, Richard Featherstone and Edward Powell—all Catholics—were hanged and quartered while the Protestants burned. European observers were very shocked and bewildered. French diplomat Charles de Marillac wrote that Henry's religious policy was a "climax of evils" and that:

[I]t is difficult to have a people entirely opposed to new errors which does not hold with the ancient authority of the Church and of the Holy See, or, on the other hand, hating the Pope, which does not share some opinions with the Germans. Yet the government will not have either the one or the other, but insists on their keeping what is commanded, which is so often altered that it is difficult to understand what it is.

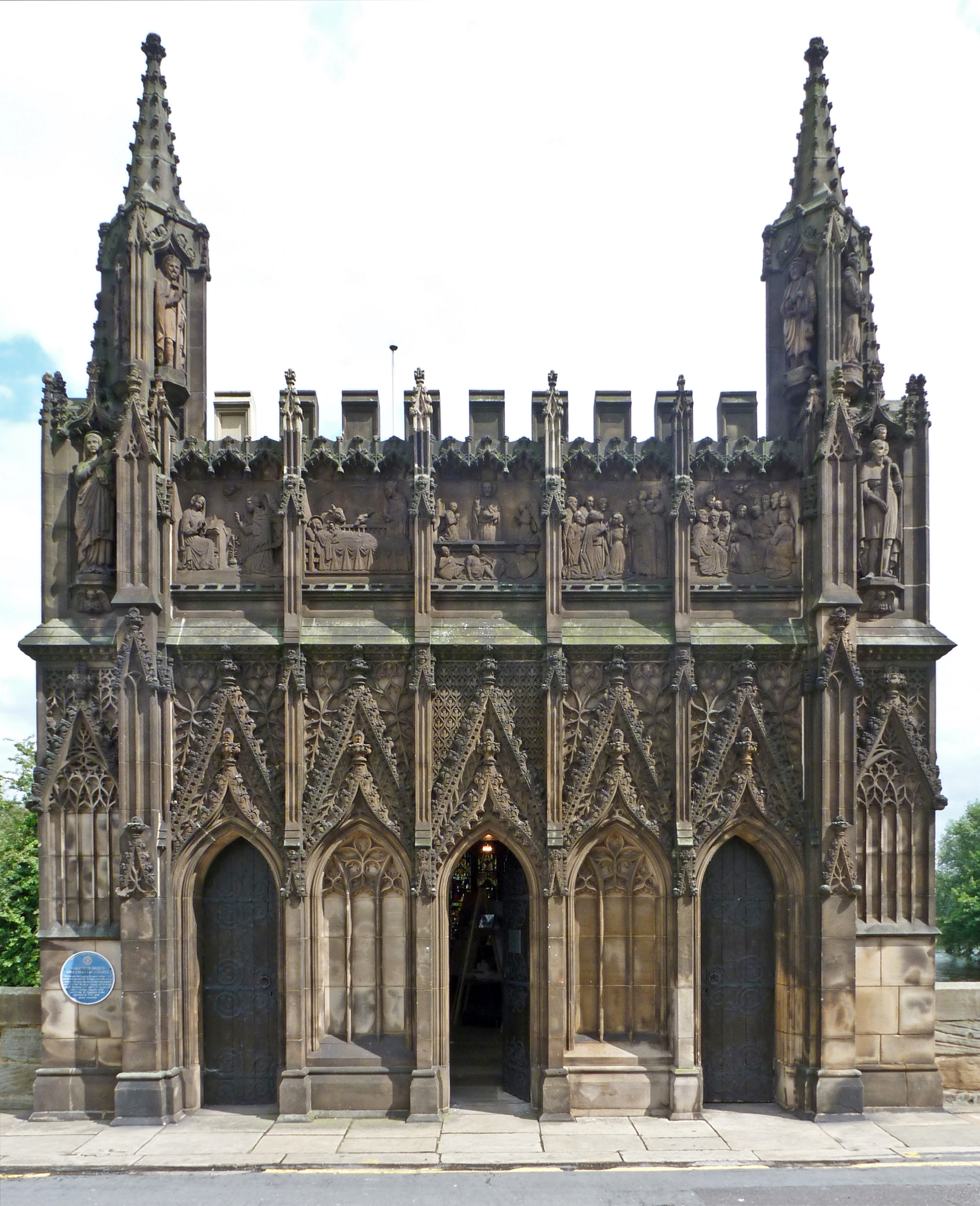
The 14th-century Chantry Chapel of St Mary the Virgin in Wakefield, West Yorkshire. Chantries were endowments that paid priests to say masses for the dead to lessen their time in purgatory.

Despite some setbacks, Protestants managed to win some victories. In May 1541 the King ordered copies of the Great Bible to be placed in all churches; any failure to comply would result in a £2 fine. The Protestants could celebrate the growing access to vernacular scripture as most churches had Bibles by 1545. The iconoclastic policies of 1538 were continued in the autumn when the Archbishops of Canterbury and York were ordered to destroy all the remaining shrines in England. Furthermore, Cranmer survived formal charges of heresy in the Prebendaries' Plot of 1543.

Traditionalists, nevertheless, seemed to have the upper hand. By the spring of 1543, Protestant innovations had been reversed, and only the break with Rome and the dissolution of the monasteries remained unchanged. In May 1543, a new formulary was published to replace the Bishops' Book. This King's Book rejected justification by faith alone and defended traditional ceremonies and the use of images. This was followed days later by passage of the Act for the Advancement of True Religion, which restricted the Bible reading to men and women of noble birth. Henry expressed his fears to Parliament in 1545 that "the Word of God, is disputed, rhymed, sung and jangled in every ale house and tavern, contrary to the true meaning and doctrine of the same."

By the spring of 1544, the conservatives appeared to be losing influence once again. In March, Parliament made it more difficult to prosecute people for violating the Six Articles. Cranmer's Exhortation and Litany, the first official vernacular service, was published in June 1544, and the King's Primer became the only authorised English prayer book in May 1545. Both texts had a reformed emphasis. (Note: Haigh (1993, p. 162) argues that the Litany and Primer were largely traditional devotions and that the popularity of the Primer "suggest a continued vitality in conventional religion". Marshall (2017, pp. 291, 293), however, argues that both the Litany and Primer were reformed in outlook, especially in their reduced emphasis on the invocation of saints. They were successful, he writes, in "taking an old-fashioned form and subverting its traditional purposes". Duffy (2005, pp. 446–447) agrees with Marshall.) After the death of the conservative Edward Lee in September 1544, the Protestant Robert Holgate replaced him as Archbishop of York. In December 1545, the King was empowered to seize the property of chantries (trust funds endowed to pay for priests to say masses for the dead). While Henry's motives were largely financial (England was at war with France and desperately in need of funds), the passage of the Chantries Act was "an indication of how deeply the doctrine of purgatory had been eroded and discredited".

In 1546 the conservatives were once again in the ascendant. A series of controversial sermons preached by the Protestant Edward Crome set off a persecution of Protestants that the traditionalists used to effectively target their rivals. It was during this time that Anne Askew was tortured in the Tower of London and burnt at the stake. Even Henry's last wife, Katherine Parr, was suspected of heresy, but saved herself by appealing to his mercy. With the Protestants on the defensive, traditionalists pressed their advantage by banning Protestant books.

The conservative persecution of Queen Katherine, however, backfired. By November 1546, there were already signs that religious policy was once again tilting towards Protestantism. (Note: According to MacCulloch (1996, pp. 356–357), Cranmer believed Henry would have pursued a radical iconoclastic policy and a transformation of the mass into a Protestant communion service if he had lived.) The King's will provided for a regency council to rule after his death, which would have been dominated by traditionalists, such as Thomas Howard, 3rd Duke of Norfolk, Thomas Wriothesly, 1st Earl of Southampton (the Lord Chancellor), Bishop Gardiner and Bishop Cuthbert Tunstall. After a dispute with the King, Bishop Gardiner, the leading conservative churchman, was disgraced and removed as a councilor. Later, the Duke of Norfolk, the most powerful conservative nobleman, was arrested. By the time Henry died in 1547, the Protestant Edward Seymour, brother of Jane Seymour, Henry's third wife (and therefore uncle to the future Edward VI), managed—by a number of alliances such as with Lord Lisle—to gain control over the Privy Council.
