= Proclamation by the Crown Act 1539 =

Act of the Parliament of England

- Act of Parliament
- Parliament of England
- Long title: An Act that Proclamations made by the King's Highness, with the Advice of His Honourable Council, shall be obeyed, and kept as though they were made by Act of Parliament.
- Citation: 31 Hen. 8. c. 8
- Territorial extent: England and Wales

Dates
- Royal assent: 28 June 1539
- Commencement: 28 April 1539 (Note: Start of session.)
- Repealed: 4 November 1547
Other legislation
| Repealed by | Treason Act 1547 |

Status: Repealed

Text of statute as originally enacted

The Proclamation by the Crown Act 1539 (31 Hen. 8. c. 8), also known as the Statute of Proclamations, was an act of the English Reformation Parliament passed by Henry VIII. The act permitted the King to rule by decree, ordering that "traditional" proclamations (those unable to impose the death penalty or forfeiture of goods) should be obeyed as "though they were made by act of parliament". In addition the act appointed machinery for their enforcement.

The English jurist Sir William Blackstone (d. 1780), called the act "a statute, which was calculated to introduce the most despotic tyranny; and which must have proved fatal to the liberties of this kingdom, had it not been luckily repealed."

The act was once considered to be the height of Henry VIII's despotism. The great efforts made by the King's chief minister, Thomas Cromwell, when drafting the acts of this time show that he was aware of the importance of statute and Parliament.

Cromwell's natural reaction to any problem of government was to draft a bill. However, there were times when an immediate decision or temporary policy was required without having to wait for Parliament. For example, in 1535 it was desired to prevent the export of currency from the realm; Cromwell insisted on finding a relevant statute, although he was relieved to hear from the judges that, in such matters, failing such a statute, the king had the power to issue a proclamation. Nevertheless, Cromwell felt unsatisfied, and hence the Proclamation by the Crown Act 1539, designed to give general legal sanction to royal proclamations.

Cromwell originally intended to allow the common-law courts to enforce these proclamations. However, opposition from the House of Lords forced him instead to accept a council as nominated in the act. This council proved so incapable of doing the work that in 1547, when this act was repealed, it made no difference to the legality of royal proclamations.

Proclamations would continue to prove controversial, especially when it came to taxation in which it was seen as an arbitrary power, becoming one of the many reasons for the Wars of the Three Kingdoms. Restored Stuart attempts at emulating French absolutism through revival of proclamations would be a factor in causing the eventual Glorious Revolution, leading to the Bill of Rights that entrenched parliamentary sovereignty.

The King for the time being, with the advice of his council, or the more part of them, may set forth proclamations under such penalties and pains as to him and them shall seem necessary, which shall be observed as though they were made by act of parliament; but this shall not be prejudicial to any person's inheritance, offices, liberties, goods, chattels or life; and whosoever shall willingly offend any article contained in the said proclamations, shall pay such forfeitures, or be so long imprisoned, as shall be expressed in the said proclamations; and if any offending will depart the realm, to the intent he will not answer his said offence, he shall be adjudged a traitor.

== Subsequent developments ==
The whole act was repealed by section 4 of the Treason Act 1547 (1 Edw. 6. c. 12), which came into force on 4 November 1597.

== See also ==
- List of acts of the Parliament of England
- Henry VIII clause
