= Thirty-nine Articles =

Anglican doctrinal statement

The Thirty-nine Articles of Religion (commonly abbreviated as the Thirty-nine Articles or the XXXIX Articles), finalised in 1571, are the historically defining statements of doctrines and practices of the Church of England with respect to the controversies of the English Reformation. The Thirty-nine Articles form part of the Book of Common Prayer used by the Church of England, and feature in the theology of much of the worldwide Anglican Communion (including the Episcopal Church of the United States), and that of denominations outside the Anglican Communion that identify with the Anglican tradition (see Continuing Anglican movement).

When Henry VIII broke with the Church of Rome and was excommunicated, he began the reform of the Church of England, which would be headed by the monarch (himself), rather than the pope. At this point, he needed to determine what its doctrines and practices would be in relation to the Church of Rome and the new Protestant movements in continental Europe. A series of defining documents were written and replaced over a period of thirty years as the doctrinal and political situation changed from the excommunication of Henry VIII in 1533, to the excommunication of Elizabeth I in 1570. These positions began with the Ten Articles in 1536, and concluded with the finalisation of the Thirty-nine articles in 1571. The Thirty-nine articles ultimately served to define the doctrine of the Church of England as it related to the Four Marks of the Church and to Calvinist doctrine and Roman Catholic practice.

The articles went through at least five major revisions prior to their finalisation in 1571. The first attempt was the Ten Articles in 1536, which showed some slightly Protestant leanings – the result of Henry VIII's desire for a political alliance with the German Lutheran princes. The next revision was the Six Articles in 1539 which swung away from all reformed positions, and then the King's Book in 1543, which re-established most of the earlier Catholic doctrines. In 1552, during the reign of Edward VI, Henry VIII's son, the Forty-two Articles were written under the direction of Archbishop Thomas Cranmer. It was in this document that Calvinist thought reached the zenith of its influence in the English Church. These articles were never put into action, owing to Edward VI's death and the reversion of the English Church to Roman Catholicism under Henry VIII's elder daughter, Mary I.

Finally, upon the coronation of Elizabeth I and the re-establishment of the Church of England as separate from the Catholic Church, the Thirty-nine Articles of Religion were initiated by the Convocation of 1563, under the direction of Matthew Parker, the Archbishop of Canterbury.

The Thirty-nine Articles were finalised in 1571, and incorporated into the Book of Common Prayer. Although not the end of the struggle between Catholic and Protestant monarchs and citizens, the book helped to standardise the English language, and was to have a lasting effect on religion in the United Kingdom and elsewhere through its wide use.

== Predecessors ==
=== Ten Articles (1536) ===
The Church of England's break with Rome inaugurated a period of doctrinal confusion and controversy as both conservative and reforming clergy attempted to shape the church's direction, the former as "Catholicism without the Pope" and the latter as Protestant. In an attempt "to establish Christian quietness and unity", the Ten Articles were adopted by clerical Convocation in July 1536 as the English Church's first post-papal doctrinal statement. The Ten Articles were crafted as a rushed interim compromise between conservatives and reformers. Historians have variously described it as a victory for Lutheranism and a success for Catholic resistance. Its provisions have also been described as "confusing".

The first five articles dealt with doctrines that were "commanded expressly by God, and are necessary to our salvation", while the last five articles dealt with "laudable ceremonies used in the Church". This division reflects how the Articles originated from two different discussions earlier in the year. The first five articles were based on the Wittenberg Articles negotiated between English ambassadors Edward Foxe, Nicholas Heath and Robert Barnes and German Lutheran theologians, including Martin Luther and Philip Melanchthon. This doctrinal statement was itself based on the Augsburg Confession of 1530.

The five principal doctrines were the Bible and ecumenical creeds, baptism, penance, the Eucharist and justification. The core doctrine in the Ten Articles was justification by faith. Justification – which was defined as remission of sin and accepting into God's favour – was through "the only mercy and grace of the Father, promised freely unto us for his Son’s sake Jesus Christ, and the merits of his blood and passion". Good works would follow, not precede, justification. However, the Lutheran influence was diluted with qualifications. Justification was attained "by contrition and faith joined with charity". In other words, good works were "necessarily required to the attaining of everlasting life".

To the disappointment of conservatives, only three of the traditional seven sacraments were even mentioned (baptism, the Eucharist and penance). The Articles affirm the real presence of Christ in the Eucharist, stating that "under the form and figure of bread and wine ... is verily, substantially and really contained the very self-same body and blood of our Lord Jesus Christ". This definition was acceptable to those who held to transubstantiation or sacramental union, but it clearly condemned sacramentarianism. More controversially for the reformers, the Articles maintained penance as a sacrament and the priest's authority to grant divine absolution in confession.

Articles six to ten focused on secondary issues. Significantly, purgatory, which had been a central concern of medieval religion, was placed in the non-essential articles. On the question of its existence, the Ten Articles were ambiguous. They stated, "the place where [departed souls] be, the name thereof, and kind of pains there" was "uncertain by scripture". Prayer for the dead and masses for the dead were permitted as arguably relieving the pain of departed souls in purgatory.

The Articles also defended the use of a number of Catholic rituals and practices opposed by Protestants, such as kissing the cross on Good Friday, while mildly criticising popular abuses and excesses. The use of religious images was permitted but people were to be taught not to kneel before them or make offerings to them. Prayer to Mary, mother of Jesus, and all the other saints was permitted as long as superstition was avoided.

In summary, the Ten Articles asserted:

1. The Bible and the three ecumenical creeds are the basis and summary of true Christian faith.
2. Baptism imparts remission of sins and regeneration and is necessary for salvation, even in the case of infants. It condemns the opinions of 'Anabaptists' and 'Pelagians' as heresy.
3. The sacrament of penance, with confession and absolution, is necessary to salvation.
4. That the body and blood of Christ are really present in the Eucharist.
5. Justification is by faith, but good works are necessary.
6. Images can be used as representations of virtue and good example and also to remind people of their sins but are not objects of worship.
7. Saints are to be honoured as examples of life and as furthering the prayers of the faithful.
8. Praying to saints is permitted, and holy days should be observed.
9. The observance of various rites and ceremonies, such as clerical vestments, sprinkling of holy water, bearing of candles on Candlemas, giving of ashes on Ash Wednesday, is good and laudable. However, none of these has power to forgive sin.
10. It is a good and charitable deed to pray for the dead. However, the doctrine of purgatory is biblically uncertain. Abuses related to purgatory, such as the claim that papal indulgences or masses for the dead offered at certain localities (such as the scala coeli mass) can deliver immediately from purgatory, are to be rejected.

=== Bishops' Book (1537) ===
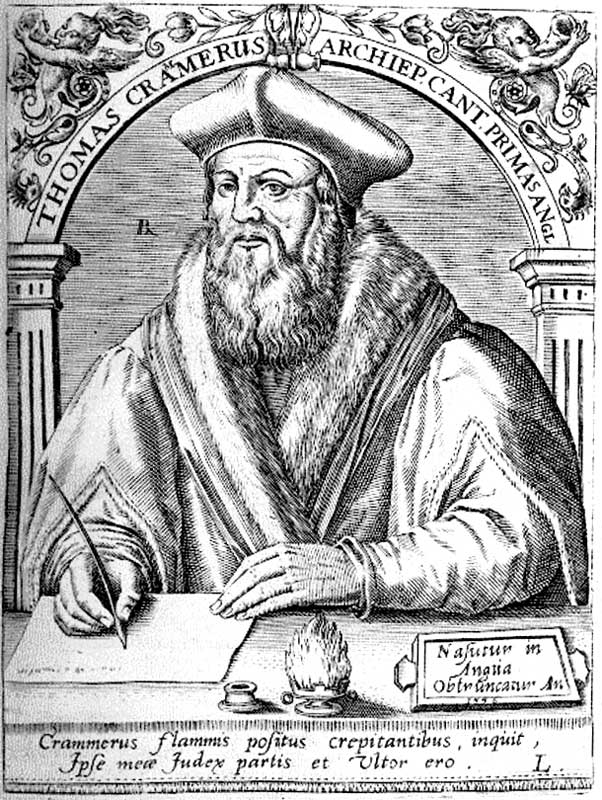
Thomas Cranmer headed the committee that authored the Bishop's Book

The failure of the Ten Articles to settle doctrinal controversy led Thomas Cromwell, the King's vicegerent in spirituals, to convene a national synod of bishops and high-ranking clergy for further theological discussion in February 1537. This synod produced a book called The Institution of the Christian Man (popularly called The Bishops' Book), the word institution being synonymous with instruction. The Bishops' Book preserved the semi-Lutheranism of the Ten Articles, and the articles on justification, purgatory, and the sacraments of baptism, the Eucharist and penance were incorporated unchanged into the new book.

When the synod met, conservatives were still angry that four of the traditional seven sacraments (confirmation, marriage, holy orders and extreme unction) had been excluded from the Ten Articles. John Stokesley argued for all seven, while Thomas Cranmer only acknowledged baptism and the Eucharist. The others divided along party lines. The conservatives were at a disadvantage because they found it necessary to appeal to sacred tradition, which violated Cromwell's instructions that all arguments refer to scripture.

In the end, the missing sacraments were restored but placed in a separate section to emphasize "a difference in dignity and necessity." Only baptism, the Eucharist and penance were "instituted of Christ, to be as certain instruments or remedies necessary for our salvation". Confirmation was declared to have been introduced by the early Church in imitation of what they had read about the practice of the Apostles.

The Bishops' Book also included expositions on the creed, the Ten Commandments, the Lord's Prayer and Hail Mary. These were greatly influenced by William Marshall's primer (an English-language book of hours) of 1535, which itself was influenced by Luther's writings. Following Marshall, The Bishops' Book rejected the traditional Catholic numbering of the Ten Commandments, in which the prohibition on making and worshiping graven images was part of the first commandment, "Thou shalt have no other gods before me". In agreement with the Eastern Orthodox and Huldrych Zwingli's church at Zurich, the authors of the Bishops' Book adopted the Jewish tradition of separating these commandments. While allowing images of Christ and the saints, the exposition on the second commandment taught against representations of God the Father and criticised those who "be more ready with their substance to deck dead images gorgeously and gloriously, than with the same to help poor Christian people, the quick and lively images of God". Such teachings encouraged iconoclasm, which would become a feature of the English Reformation.

The list of the 46 divines as they appear in the Bishop's Book included all of the bishops, eight archdeacons and 17 other Doctors of Divinity, some of whom were later involved with translating the Bible and compiling the Book of Common Prayer:

Thomas Cranmer – Edward Lee – John Stokesley – Cuthbert Tunstall – Stephen Gardiner – Robert Aldrich – John Voysey – John Longland – John Clerk – Rowland Lee – Thomas Goodrich – Nicholas Shaxton – John Bird – Edward Foxe – Hugh Latimer – John Hilsey – Richard Sampson – William Repps – William Barlowe – Robert Partew – Robert Holgate – Richard Wolman – William Knight – John Bell – Edmond Bonner – William Skip – Nicholas Heath – Cuthbert Marshal – Richard Curren – William Cliffe – William Downes – Robert Oking – Ralph Bradford – Richard Smyth – Simon Matthew – John Pryn – William Buckmaster – William May – Nicholas Wotton – Richard Cox – John Edmunds – Thomas Robertson – John Baker – Thomas Barett – John Hase – John Tyson

In August 1537, it was presented to the King who ordered that parts should be read from the pulpit every Sunday and feast day. Nevertheless, the King was not entirely satisfied and took it upon himself to make a revised Bishops' Book, which, among other proposed changes, (Note: "Most notoriously, [Henry VIII] took it upon himself to improve the wording of both the Ten Commandments and the Lord’s Prayer. He wanted the final petition of the latter to read 'and suffer us not to be led into temptation' (rather than 'lead us not into temptation'). And he amended the First Commandment ('Thou shalt have none other gods but me') to read 'Thou shalt not have nor repute any other God, or gods, but me Jesus Christ.'") weakened the original's emphasis on justification by faith. This revised version was never published. Because the Bishops' Book was never authorised by the Crown or Convocation, the Ten Articles remained the official doctrinal standard of the Church of England.

=== Six Articles (1539) ===
One of the final drafts of the Six articles (1539), amended in King Henry VIII's own hand

Fearful of diplomatic isolation and a Catholic alliance, Henry VIII continued his outreach to the Lutheran Schmalkaldic League. In May 1538, three Lutheran theologians from Germany – Franz Burchard, vice-chancellor of Saxony; Georg von Boineburg, doctor of law; and Friedrich Myconius, superintendent of the church in Gotha – arrived in London and held conferences with English bishops and clergy at the archbishop's Lambeth Palace through September. (Note: The English delegation included Cranmer, as chairman, and Nicholas Heath for the Protestant side. The conservatives included Bishops Sampson and Stokesley along with George Day and Nicholas Wilson. Bishop Tunstall was involved in negotiations as well.)

The Germans presented, as a basis of agreement, a number of articles based on the Lutheran Confession of Augsburg. Bishops Tunstall, Stokesley and others were not won over by these Protestant arguments and did everything they could to avoid agreement. They were willing to separate from Rome, but their plan was to unite with the Greek Church and not with the Protestants on the continent. The bishops also refused to eliminate what the Germans considered abuses (e.g. private masses for the dead, compulsory clerical celibacy, and withholding communion wine from the laity) allowed by the English Church. Stokesley considered these customs to be essential because the Greek Church practised them. As the King was unwilling to break with these practices, the Germans had all left England by 1 October.

Meanwhile, England was in religious turmoil. Impatient Protestants took it upon themselves to further reform – some priests said mass in English rather than Latin and married without authorisation (Archbishop Cranmer was himself secretly married). Protestants themselves were divided between establishment reformers who held Lutheran beliefs upholding the real presence of Christ in the Eucharist and radicals who held Anabaptist and Sacramentarian views denying real presence. In May 1539, a new Parliament met, and Lord Chancellor Audley told the House of Lords that the King desired religious uniformity. A committee of four conservative and four reformist bishops was appointed to examine and determine doctrine. On 16 May, the Duke of Norfolk noted that the committee had not agreed on anything and proposed that the Lords examine six controversial doctrinal questions that became the basis of the Six Articles:

1. Whether the Eucharist could be the true body of Christ without transubstantiation,
2. Whether it needed to be given to the laity under both kinds,
3. Whether vows of chastity needed to be observed as part of divine law,
4. Whether clerical celibacy should be compulsory,
5. Whether private (votive) masses were required (legitimate) by divine law,
6. Whether auricular confession (that is, confession to a priest) was necessary as part of divine law.

Statute of the Six Articles
- Act of Parliament
- Parliament of England
- Long title: An Act for abolishing of Diversity of Opinions of certain Articles concerning Christian Religion.
- Citation: 31 Hen. 8. c. 14
- Territorial extent: England and Wales

Dates
- Royal assent: 28 June 1539
- Commencement: 28 April 1539 (Note: Start of session.)
- Repealed: 4 November 1547
Other legislation
Repeals/revokes	Suppression of Heresy Act 1414
Repealed by	Treason Act 1547

Status: Repealed

Text of statute as originally enacted

Over the next month, these questions were argued in Parliament and Convocation with the active participation of the King. The final product was an affirmation of traditional teachings on all but the sixth question. Communion in one kind, compulsory clerical celibacy, vows of chastity and votive masses were a legitimate form. Protestants achieved a minor victory on auricular confession, which was declared "expedient and necessary to be retained" but not required by divine law. In addition, although the real presence was affirmed in traditional terminology, the word transubstantiation itself did not appear in the final version. (Note: The article on the Eucharist defines the real presence in these terms: "First, that in the most blessed Sacrament of the Altar, by the strength and efficacy of Christ's mighty word, it being spoken by the priest, is present really, under the form of bread and wine, the natural body and blood of Our Saviour Jesus Christ, conceived of the Virgin Mary, and that after the consecration there remaineth no substance of bread and wine, nor any other substance but the substance of Christ, God and man".)

The Act of Six Articles became law in June 1539, which, unlike the Ten Articles, gave the Six Articles statutory authority. Harsh penalties were attached to violations of the Articles. Denial of transubstantiation was punished by burning without an opportunity to recant. Denial of any of the other articles was punished by hanging or life imprisonment. Married priests had until 12 July to put away their wives, which was likely a concession granted to give Archbishop Cranmer time to move his wife and children outside of England. After the act's passage, bishops Latimer and Shaxton, outspoken opponents of the measure, were forced to resign their dioceses. The Act of Six Articles was repealed by the Treason Act 1547 (1 Edw. 6. c. 12) during the reign of Henry's son, Edward VI.

=== King's Book (1543) ===
When Parliament re-convened in April 1540, a committee was formed to revise the Bishops' Book, which Henry VIII had never liked. The committee's membership included both traditionalists and reformers, but the former held the majority. Convocation began discussing the revised text in April 1543. The King's Book, or The Necessary Doctrine and Erudition for Any Christian Man to use its formal title, was more traditional than the 1537 version and incorporated many of the King's own revisions. It was approved by a special meeting of the nobility on 6 May and differed from the Bishop's Book in having been issued under the King's authority. It was also statutorily enforced by the Act for the Advancement of True Religion. Because of its royal authorisation, the King's Book officially replaced the Ten Articles as the official doctrinal statement of the Church of England.

Significantly, the doctrine of justification by faith alone was totally rejected. Cranmer tried to save the doctrine by arguing that while true faith was accompanied by good works (in other words, faith was not alone) it was only faith that justified. However, Henry would not be persuaded, and the text was amended to read that faith justified "neither only nor alone". It also stated that each person had free will to be "a worker ... in the attaining of his own justification". The King's Book also endorsed traditional views of the mass, transubstantiation, confession, and Church ceremonies. The traditional seven sacraments were all included without any distinction in importance made between them. It was taught that the second commandment did not forbid images but only "godly honour" being given to them. Looking at images of Christ and the saints "provoked, kindled and stirred to yield thanks to Our Lord".

The one area in which the King's Book moved away from traditional teaching was on prayer for the dead and purgatory. It taught that no one could know whether prayers or masses for the dead benefited an individual soul, and it was better to offer prayers for "the universal congregation of Christian people, quick and dead". People were encouraged to "abstain from the name of purgatory, and no more dispute or reason thereof". Presumably, the hostility towards purgatory derived from its connection to papal authority. The King's own behavior sent mixed signals. In 1540, he allowed offerings for the souls of deceased Knights of the Garter to be spent on works of charity instead of masses. At the same time, however, he required the new cathedral foundations to pray for the soul of Queen Jane. Perhaps because of the uncertainty surrounding this doctrine, bequests in wills for chantries, obits and masses fell by half what they had been in the 1520s.

=== Forty-two Articles (1553) ===
Henry VIII was succeeded by his son, Edward VI, in 1547. During Edward's reign, the Church of England adopted a stronger Protestant identity. The Book of Common Prayer of 1549 authorised a reformed liturgy, and the 1552 Book of Common Prayer was even more explicitly Protestant. To make the English Church fully Protestant, Cranmer also envisioned a reform of canon law and the creation of a concise doctrinal statement, which would become the Forty-two Articles. Work on a doctrinal statement was delayed by Cranmer's efforts to forge a doctrinal consensus among the various Protestant churches to counter the work of the Catholic Council of Trent. When this proved impossible, Cranmer turned his attention to defining what the Church of England believed.

In late 1552 the first edition of the confession was produced in the form of the Forty-Five Articles that Cranmer submitted for comment and revision, and which were approved by Parliament in June of 1553 by which time their number had been reduced to the Forty-two Articles which were drafted by Cranmer and a small group of fellow Protestants. The title page claimed that the articles were approved by Convocation when in reality they were never discussed or adopted by the clerical body. They were also never approved by Parliament. The articles were issued by Royal Mandate on 19 June 1553. All clergy, schoolmasters and members of the universities were required to subscribe to them. The theology of the articles has been described by some as a "restrained" Calvinism. Others point to a much stronger Lutheran influence.

== Development ==
Edward died in 1553. With the coronation of Mary I and the reunion of the Church of England with the Catholic Church, the articles were never enforced. However, after Mary's death, they became the basis of the Thirty-nine Articles. In 1563, Convocation met under Archbishop Parker to revise the articles. Convocation passed only 39 of the 42, and Elizabeth reduced the number to 38 by throwing out Article 29 to avoid offending her subjects with Catholic leanings. In 1571, despite the opposition of Bishop Edmund Gheast, Article 29 was re-inserted, declaring that the wicked do not eat the Body of Christ. This was done following the queen's excommunication by the Pope Pius V in 1570. That act destroyed any hope of reconciliation with Rome and it was no longer necessary to fear that Article 29 would offend Catholic sensibilities. The Articles, increased to Thirty-nine, were ratified by the Queen, and the bishops and clergy were required to assent.

== Content ==
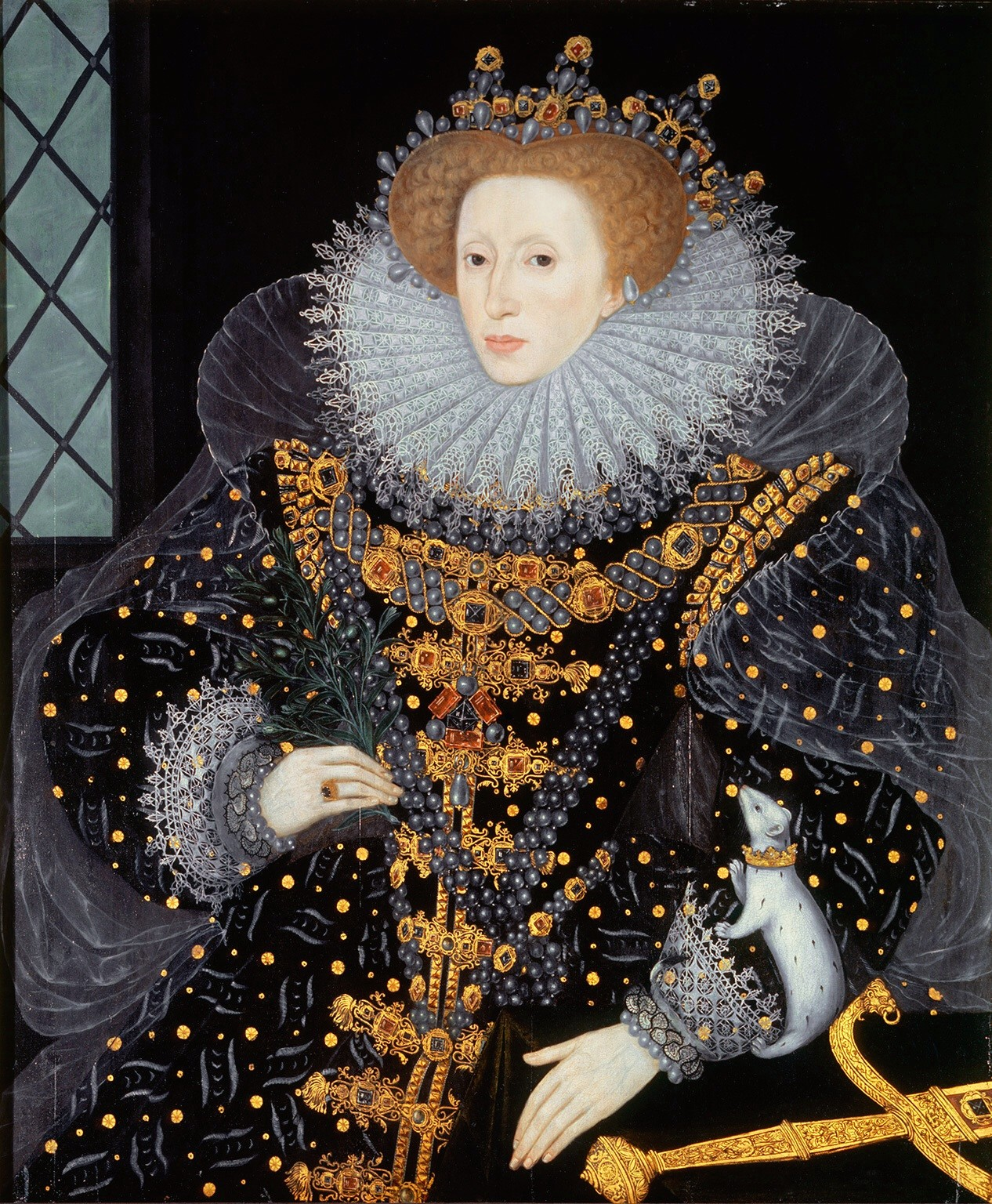
Elizabeth I, in whose reign the Thirty-nine Articles were passed

The Thirty-nine Articles were intended to establish, in basic terms, the faith and practice of the Church of England. While not designed to be a creed or complete statement of the Christian faith, the articles explain the doctrinal position of the Church of England in relation to Calvinism, as well as Catholicism and Anabaptism. According to historian Anthony Milton, "the Thirty-Nine Articles were certainly broadly consistent with the Reformed consensus in doctrinal matters".

Thirty-nine Articles
1. Of Faith in the Holy Trinity.; 2. Of Christ the Son of God.; 3. Of his going down into Hell.; 4. Of his Resurrection.; 5. Of the Holy Ghost.; 6. Of the Sufficiency of the Scripture.; 7. Of the Old Testament.; 8. Of the Three Creeds.; 9. Of Original or Birth-sin.; 10. Of Free-Will.; 11. Of Justification.; 12. Of Good Works.; 13. Of Works before Justification.; 14. Of Works of Supererogation.; 15. Of Christ alone without Sin.; 16. Of Sin after Baptism.; 17. Of Predestination and Election.; 18. Of obtaining Salvation by Christ.; 19. Of the Church.; 20. Of the Authority of the Church.	21. Of the Authority of General Councils.; 22. Of Purgatory.; 23. Of Ministering in the Congregation.; 24. Of speaking in the Congregation.; 25. Of the Sacraments.; 26. Of the Unworthiness of Ministers.; 27. Of Baptism.; 28. Of the Lord's Supper.; 29. Of the Wicked which eat not the Body of Christ.; 30. Of both kinds.; 31. Of Christ's one Oblation.; 32. Of the Marriage of Priests.; 33. Of Excommunicate Persons.; 34. Of the Traditions of the Church.; 35. Of the Homilies.; 36. Of Consecrating of Ministers.; 37. Of Civil Magistrates.; 38. Of Christian men's Goods.; 39. Of a Christian man's Oath.

The Thirty-nine Articles can be divided into eight sections based on their content:

Articles 1–5: The Doctrine of God: The first five articles articulate the doctrine of God, the Holy Trinity and the incarnation of Jesus Christ. This is a departure from other doctrinal statements of the 16th and 17th centuries such as the Helvetic Confessions and the Westminster Confession, which begin with the doctrine of revelation and Holy Scripture as the source of knowledge about God.

Articles 6–8: Scripture and the Creeds: These articles state that Holy Scripture contains everything necessary for salvation, so that no one can be required to believe any doctrine that cannot be proved on the basis of biblical teaching. The articles acknowledge the authority of the Apostles' Creed, the Nicene Creed and the Athanasian Creed because they express Scriptural teaching. It states that the Apocrypha is not part of Scripture. While not a basis of doctrine, the Apocrypha continues to be read by the church for moral instruction and examples for holy living.

Articles 9–18: Sin and Salvation: These articles discuss the doctrines of original sin and justification by faith (salvation is a gift received through faith in Christ). They reject the medieval Catholic teachings on works of supererogation and that performing good works can make a person worthy to receive justification (congruous merit). They also reject the radical Protestant teaching that a person could be free from sin in this life. The articles address the doctrine of predestination—that "Predestination to life is the everlasting purpose of God". Double predestination, the belief that God has also predestined some people to reprobation, is not endorsed by the articles.

Articles 19–21: The Church and its Authority: These articles explain the nature and authority of the visible church. They state that the church, under Scripture, has authority over matters of faith and order. General councils of the church can only be called with the permission of the civil authority. It is possible for church councils to reach the wrong decisions, so they should only be followed if their actions align with Scripture.

Articles 22–24: Errors to be avoided in the Church: These articles condemn the Catholic teachings on purgatory, indulgences, the use of religious images and the invocation of saints. In addition, the Catholic practice of using Latin as a liturgical language is disapproved of in favour of the vernacular. The articles state that no person should preach publicly or administer the sacraments unless they are called and authorised by legitimate church authority. This was meant to counter the radical Protestant belief that a Christian could preach and act as a minister on his own initiative in defiance of church authorities.

Articles 25–31: The Sacraments: These articles explain the Church of England's sacramental theology. According to the articles, sacraments are signs of divine grace which God works invisibly but effectively in people's lives. Through sacraments, God creates and strengthens the faith of believers. The radical Protestant belief that sacraments are only outward signs of a person's faith is denied by the articles. While the Catholic Church claimed seven sacraments, the articles recognise only two: baptism and the Lord's Supper. The five rites called sacraments by Catholics are identified in the articles as either corrupted imitations of the Apostles (confirmation, penance and extreme unction) or as "states of life allowed in the Scriptures" (holy orders and marriage).

Regeneration (or the gift of new life), membership in the church, forgiveness of sins and adoption as children of God are all received through baptism. The articles state that infant baptism is "most agreeable with the institution of Christ" and should continue to be practised in the church. In the Lord's Supper, participants become partakers of the body and blood of Christ and receive the spiritual benefits of Christ's death on the cross. According to the articles, this partaking should not be understood in terms of the Catholic doctrine of transubstantiation, which is condemned as "repugnant to the plain words of Scripture". Instead, the articles declare that there is no change in the substance of the bread and wine. Rather, participants are fed the body of Christ by the Holy Spirit and through faith. The articles declare that "The offering of Christ once made is the perfect redemption, propitiation, and satisfaction for all the sins of the whole world". This was meant as a repudiation of the popular medieval idea that the Mass was a sacrifice in which Christ was offered for the forgiveness of sins for the living and the dead in purgatory.

Articles 32–36: The Discipline of the Church: The articles defend the practice of clerical marriage and the church's power of excommunication. It states that traditions and ceremonies in the church may vary by time and place; national churches can alter or abolish traditions created by human authority. The First and Second Book of Homilies are said to contain correct doctrine and should be read in church. The articles also defend the ordination rites contained in the 1549 and 1552 Ordinals.

Articles 37–39: Christians and Civil Society: The articles affirm the role of the monarch as the Supreme Governor of the Church of England. It rejects all claims to the Pope's jurisdiction in England. It defends the state's right to use capital punishment and declares that Christians may serve in the military. It rejects the Anabaptist teaching that the property of Christians should be held in common, but it does explain that Christians should give alms to the poor and needy. It also defends the morality of oath-taking for civic purposes.

== Later history ==
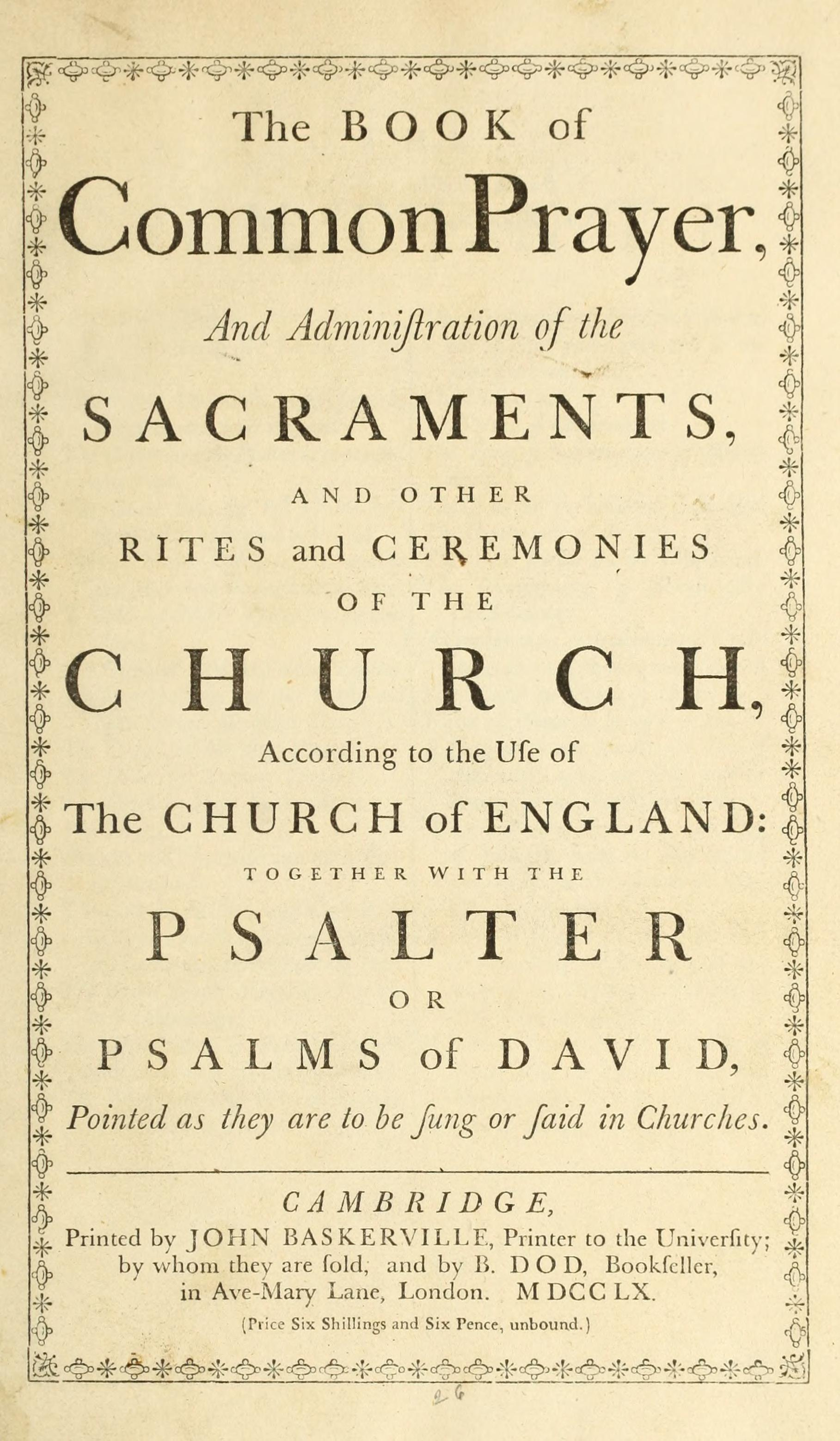
The 1662 Book of Common Prayer has long been printed with the Thirty-nine Articles.

During the reign of Elizabeth I, a "Calvinist consensus" developed within the church regarding the doctrines of salvation. Article 17 only endorsed election to salvation and was silent on whether God predestined people for reprobation; however, most of the bishops and leading churchmen believed in double predestination. When an Arminian minority emerged to challenge this consensus, Archbishop Whitgift issued the Lambeth Articles in 1595. These did not replace the Thirty-nine Articles but were meant to officially align Article 17 to Calvinist theology. The Queen was unwilling to alter her religious settlement and refused to assent to these new articles.

The Thirty-nine Articles are printed in the 1662 Book of Common Prayer and other Anglican prayer books. The Test Act 1672 made adherence to the Articles a requirement for holding civil office in England until its repeal under the Sacramental Test Act 1828. Students at Oxford University were still expected to sign up to them until the passing of the Oxford University Act 1854.

In the Church of England, only clergy (and until the 19th century members of Oxford and Cambridge Universities) are required to subscribe to the Articles. Starting in 1865, clergy affirmed that the doctrine contained in the Articles and the Book of Common Prayer was agreeable to Scripture and that they would not preach in contradiction to it. Since 1975, clergy are required to acknowledge the Articles as one of the historic formularies of the Church of England that bear witness to the faith revealed in Scripture and contained in the creeds. The Church of Ireland has a similar declaration for its clergy, while some other churches of the Anglican Communion make no such requirement. The US Episcopal Church never required subscription to the Articles.

The influence of the Articles on Anglican thought, doctrine and practice has been profound. The Articles are the confession of faith of the Anglican tradition. In Anglican discourse, the Articles are regularly cited and interpreted to clarify doctrine and practice. An important concrete manifestation of this is the Chicago–Lambeth Quadrilateral, which incorporates Articles VI, VIII, XXV, and XXXVI in its broad articulation of fundamental Anglican identity. In other circumstances they delineate the parameters of acceptable belief and practice in proscriptive fashion. The Articles continue to be invoked today in the Anglican Church. For example, in the ongoing debate over homosexual activity and the concomitant controversies over episcopal authority, Articles VI, XX, XXIII, XXVI, and XXXIV are regularly cited by those of various opinions.

Each of the 44 member churches in the Anglican Communion is, however, free to adopt and authorise its own official documents, and the Articles are not officially normative in all Anglican Churches (neither is the Athanasian Creed). The only doctrinal documents agreed upon in the Anglican Communion are the Apostles' Creed, the Nicene Creed of AD 325, and the Chicago–Lambeth Quadrilateral. Beside these documents, authorised liturgical formularies, such as Prayer Book and Ordinal, are normative. The several provincial editions of Prayer Books (and authorised alternative liturgies) are, however, not identical, although they share a greater or smaller amount of family resemblance. No specific edition of the Prayer Book is therefore binding for the entire Communion.

A revised version was adopted in 1801 by the US Episcopal Church which deleted the Athanasian Creed. Earlier, John Wesley, founder of the Methodists, adapted the Thirty-nine Articles for use by American Methodists in the 18th century. The resulting Articles of Religion remain an official doctrinal statement of the United Methodist Church.

== Interpretation ==
According to theologian Henry Chadwick, the articles are a revealing window into the ethos and character of Anglicanism, in particular in the way the document works to navigate a via media (Latin: middle path or middle way) between the beliefs and practices of the Catholic Church on the one hand, and those of the Lutheran and Reformed churches on the other hand, thus giving the Church of England a unique middle-of-the-road position. The via media was expressed so adroitly in the Articles that some Anglican scholars have labelled their content as an early example of the idea that the doctrine of Anglicanism is one of "Reformed Catholicism".

In 1628 Charles I prefixed a royal declaration to the articles, which demands a literal interpretation of them, threatening discipline for academics or churchmen teaching any personal interpretations or encouraging debate about them. It states: "no man hereafter shall either print or preach, to draw the Article aside any way, but shall submit to it in the plain and Full meaning thereof: and shall not put his own sense or comment to be the meaning of the Article, but shall take it in the literal and grammatical sense."

However, what the Articles truly mean has been a matter of debate in the Church since before they were issued. The evangelical wing of the Church has claimed to take the Articles at face value, and to regard them as of utmost importance. In 2003, evangelical Anglican clergyman Chris Pierce wrote:

The Thirty-Nine Articles define the biblically derived summations of precise Christian doctrine. The Thirty-Nine Articles are more than minimally assented to; they are believed wholeheartedly. In earlier times English and Irish evangelicals would have read Cranmer, Ridley, Latimer, Ussher, and Ryle and would unreservedly agree with Dean Litton's assessment that (quoted by Dean Paul Zahl, in his work 'The Protestant Face of Anglicanism'), 'The Anglican Church, if she is to be judged by the statements of the Articles, must be ranked among the Protestant Churches of Europe.'

This view has never been held by the whole church. In 1643, Archbishop of Armagh John Bramhall laid out a broader view of the Articles:

Some of them are the very same that are contained in the Creed; some others of them are practical truths, which come not within the proper list of points or articles to be believed; lastly, some of them are pious opinions or inferior truths, which are proposed by the Church of England to all her sons, as not to be opposed; not as essentials of Faith necessary to be believed by all Christians necessitate medii, under pain of damnation.

This divergence of opinion became overt during the Oxford Movement of the 19th century. The stipulations of Articles XXV and XXVIII were regularly invoked by evangelicals to oppose the reintroduction of certain beliefs, customs, and acts of piety with respect to the sacraments. In response, John Henry Newman's Tract 90 attempted to show that the 39 Articles could be read according to an Anglo-Catholic interpretation.

== Bibliography ==
- The Book of Common Prayer and administration of the sacraments . . . Cambridge : Printed by John Baskerville, printer to the University, by whom they are sold, and by B. Dod, bookseller, in Ave-Mary Lane, London.
- Ayris, Paul; Selwyn, David, eds. (1993). Thomas Cranmer: Churchman and Scholar. Woodbridge, Suffolk, UK: The Boydell Press. ISBN 0-85115-549-9.
- Blunt, John Henry (1878). The Reformation of the Church of England: Its History, Principles and Results. Vol. Part 1 AD 1514–1547 (4th ed.). London, Oxford, and Cambridge: Rivingtons.
- Bramhall, John (1842). "Schism Guarded". The Works of Archbishop Bramhall. Vol. 2. Oxford: J.H. Parker.
- Bray, Gerald Lewis (2004). Documents of the English Reformation 1526-1701. James Clarke & Co. ISBN 978-0-227-17239-1.
- Brown, Stephen F. (2009). Protestantism. New York: Chelsea House. ISBN 978-1-60413-112-3.
- Chadwick, Henry (1988). "Tradition, Fathers, and Councils". In Sykes, Stephen; Booty, John E. (eds.). The Study of Anglicanism. London: SPCK/Fortress Press. ISBN 978-0-8006-2087-5.
- Chapman, Mark (2006). Anglicanism: A Very Short Introduction. Oxford: OUP. ISBN 978-0-19-157819-9.
- Cross, Frank Leslie; Livingstone, Elizabeth A., eds. (1997). The Oxford Dictionary of the Christian Church (3rd ed.). Oxford University Press. ISBN 978-0-19-211655-0.
- d'Aubigné, J. H. Merle (1972). The Reformation in England. Vol. 2 Book 3. Edinburgh: Banner of Truth Trust. ISBN 978-0-85151-487-1.
- Davie, Martin (2013). Our Inheritance of Faith: A Commentary on the Thirty Nine Articles. Gilead Books Publishing. ISBN 978-0956856074.
- Guy, John (1990). Tudor England. Oxford: OUP. ISBN 978-0-19-285213-7.
- Haigh, Christopher (1993). English Reformations: Religion, Politics, and Society Under the Tudors. Clarendon Press. ISBN 0198221622.
- Heal, Felicity (2003). Reformation in Britain and Ireland. Oxford University Press. ISBN 978-0-19-928015-5.
- MacCulloch, Diarmaid (1996). Thomas Cranmer: A Life. London: Yale University Press. ISBN 0-300-06688-0..
- MacCulloch, Diarmaid, ed. (1999). The Book of Common Prayer: 1662 Version (includes Appendices from the 1549 Version and Other Commemorations). Issue 241 of Everyman's library. David Campbell Publishers. ISBN 978-1-85715-241-8 – via Church of England.
- Mackie, J. D. (1994). The Earlier Tudors, 1485–1558. Oxford Paperbacks. ISBN 0-19-285292-2.
- Marshall, Peter (2017). Heretics and Believers: A History of the English Reformation. Yale University Press. ISBN 978-0300170627.
- Marshall, Peter (2017b). "Settlement Patterns: The Church of England, 1553–1603". In Milton, Anthony (ed.). The Oxford History of Anglicanism. Vol. 1: Reformation and Identity, c. 1520–1662. Oxford University Press. pp. 45–62. ISBN 9780199639731.
- Moyes, James (1913). "Anglicanism" . In Herbermann, Charles (ed.). Catholic Encyclopedia. New York: Robert Appleton Company.
- Newman, John Henry (1841). Remarks on Certain Passages in the Thirty-nine Articles. Tract No 90 of Tracts for the Times. J.G.F. & J. Rivington. p. 1.
- O'Donovan, Oliver (2011). On the Thirty Nine Articles: A Conversation with Tudor Christianity (2nd ed.). London: SCM Press. ISBN 9780334047810.
- Pierce, Chris (2003). "A Look across the Pond - A brief analysis of the status of the evangelical Anglicanism in the US and Canada" (PDF). Cross†way (89).
- Ridley, Jasper (2013) [1962]. Thomas Cranmer. Pan Macmillan. ISBN 978-1-4472-4128-7. OCLC 398369.
- Wilson, William Gilbert; Templeton, J. H. (1962). Anglican Teaching: An Exposition of the Thirty-nine Articles. Dublin: Association for Promoting Christian Knowledge.
- "Wittenberg Articles". Christian Cyclopedia. Concordia Publishing House. 2000.

Further reading

- Anderson, James Stuart Murray (1856). The History of the Church of England in the Colonies and Foreign Dependencies of the British Empire. Vol. III. Rivingtons.
- Bicknell, Edward John (1919). A theological introduction to the Thirty-nine articles of the Church of England. London: Longmans.
- Boultbee, Thomas Pownall (1877). A Commentary on the Thirty-nine Articles: Forming an Introduction to the Theology of the Church of England. Longmans.
- Denison, Edward (1835). A Review of the State of the Question respecting the Admission of Dissenters to the Universities . London: John Cochran.
- Douglas, Brian (2011). A Companion to Anglican Eucharistic Theology. Vol. 1: The Reformation to the 19th Century. Leiden: Brill. pp. 234–246. ISBN 978-90-04-21930-4.
- Gibson, Edgar Charles Sumner (1908). The Thirty-nine Articles of the Church of England Explained... Methuen & Company.
- Kirby, Torrance (2009). "The Articles of Religion of the Church of England (1563/71), commonly called the Thirty-Nine Articles.". In Mühling, Andreas; Opitz, Peter (eds.). Reformierte Bekenntnisschriften. Vol. Band 2/1, 1559–1563. Neukirchen-Vluyn: Neukirchener Verlag. pp. 371–410.
- Redworth, Glyn (2011). "A Study in the Formulation of Policy: The Genesis and Evolution of the Act of Six Articles". The Journal of Ecclesiastical History. 37 (1): 42–67. doi:10.1017/S0022046900031900. ISSN 0022-0469. S2CID 162584862.
