= Treason Act 1429 =

Act of the Parliament of England

- Act of Parliament
- Parliament of England
- Long title: If any threaten by casting of bills to burn a house, if money be not laid in a certain place; and after do burn the house: Such burning of houses shall be adjudged high treason.
- Citation: 8 Hen. 6. c. 6
- Territorial extent: England and Wales; Ireland

Dates
- Royal assent: 23 February 1430
- Commencement: 22 September 1429 (Note: Start of session.)
- Repealed: England and Wales: 28 July 1863; Ireland: 10 August 1872

Other legislation
- Amended by: Treason Act 1547; Treason Act 1553
- Repealed by: England and Wales: Statute Law Revision Act 1863; Ireland: Statute Law (Ireland) Revision Act 1872

Status: Repealed

Text of statute as originally enacted

The Treason Act 1429 (8 Hen. 6. c. 6) was an act of the Parliament of England. The act made it high treason for a person to threaten to burn someone's house down if they (the owner of the house) did not leave money in a certain place, and then carry out the threat. It also made it a felony to send a letter demanding money.

This category of treason was abolished by the Treason Act 1547 (1 Edw. 6. c. 12).

== Subsequent developments ==
The act was extended to Ireland by Poynings' Law 1495 (10 Hen. 7. c. 22 (I)).

The whole act was repealed for England and Wales by section 1 of, and the schedule to, the Statute Law Revision Act 1863 (26 & 27 Vict. c. 125), which came into force on 28 July 1863.

The whole act was repealed for Ireland by section 1 of, and the schedule to, the Statute Law (Ireland) Revision Act 1872 (35 & 36 Vict. c. 98), which came into force on 10 August 1872.

== See also ==
- Arson
- High treason in the United Kingdom
