= Proclamation =

Official declaration

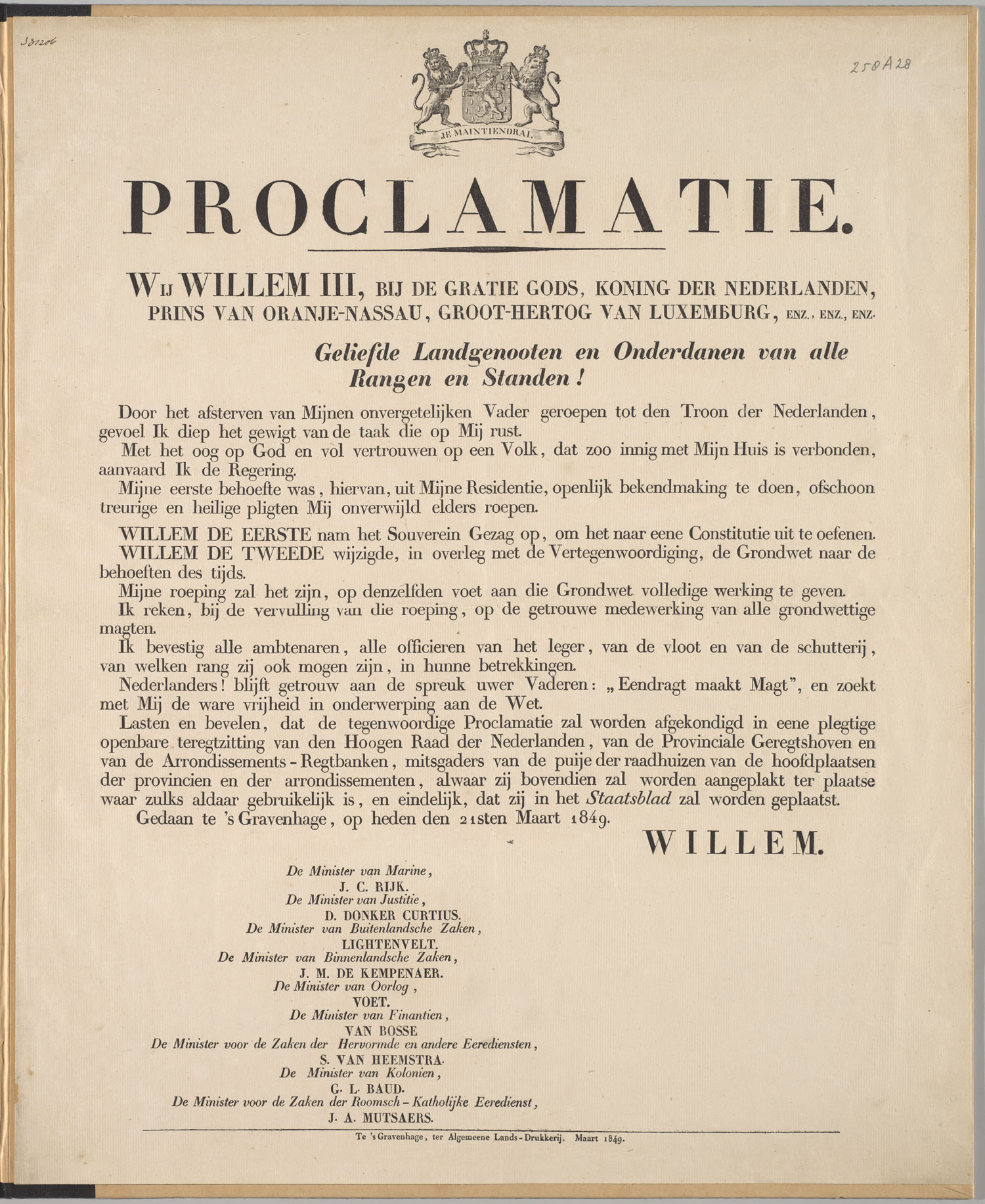
Proclamation of King William III of the Netherlands regarding his accession, 1849

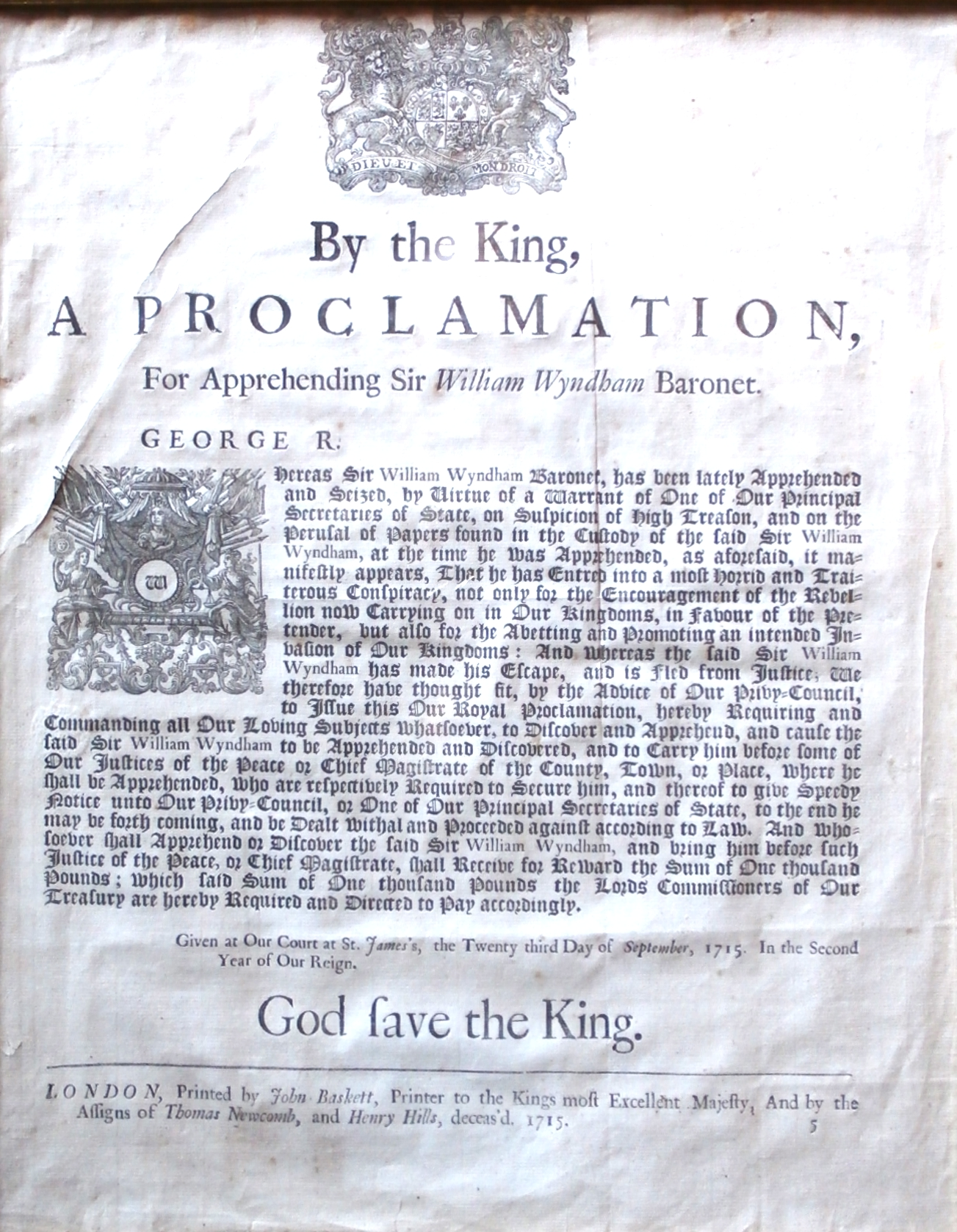
Handbill publishing the royal proclamation of King George I, dated 23 September 1715, for the "discovery and apprehension" of Sir William Wyndham, 3rd Baronet, the Jacobite leader

A proclamation (Lat. proclamare, to make public by announcement) is an official declaration issued by a person of authority to make certain announcements known. Proclamations are currently used within the governing framework of some nations and are usually issued in the name of the head of state. A proclamation is (usually) a non-binding notice.

A general distinction is made between official proclamations from states and state organs with a binding character and proclamations from political-social groups or organizations, both of which try to win over the mood of those addressed. In addition, the procedure of proclaiming the beginning of a rule over a certain ruling territory is called a proclamation. For example, on July 26, 1581, the Proclamation of Dutch Independence was signed which led to the creation of the Dutch Republic in 1588, formally recognized in 1648 by the Peace of Münster.

The announcement of the intention to marry two people, the bidding, was referred to as a "proclamation" because it was done by reading out a corresponding text during the service.

In the cities, laws, ordinances, etc. were "proclaimed" up to modern times so that they would become known and effective.

== United Kingdom ==
In English law, a proclamation is a formal announcement ("royal proclamation"), made under the great seal, of some matter which the King-in-Council or Queen-in-Council desires to make known to his or her subjects: e.g., the declaration of war, or state of emergency, the statement of neutrality, the summoning or dissolution of Parliament, or the bringing into operation of the provisions of some statute the enforcement of which the legislature has left to the discretion of the king or queen in the announcement. Proclamations are also used for declaring bank holidays and the issuance of coinage.

Royal proclamations of this character, made in furtherance of the executive power of the Crown, are binding on the subject, "where they do not either contradict the old laws or tend to establish new ones, but only confine the execution of such laws as are already in being in such matter as the sovereign shall judge necessary" (Blackstone's Commentaries, ed. Stephen, ii. 528; Stephen's Commentaries, 14th ed. 1903, ii. 506, 507; Dicey, Law of the Constitution, 6th ed., 51). Royal proclamations, which, although not made in pursuance of the executive powers of the Crown, either call upon the subject to fulfil some duty which they are by law bound to perform, or to abstain from any acts or conduct already prohibited by law, are lawful and right, and disobedience to them (while not of itself a misdemeanour) is an aggravation of the offence (see charge of Chief Justice Cockburn to the grand jury in R v. Eyre (1867) and Case of Proclamations 1610, 12 Co. Rep. 74).

The Crown has from time to time legislated by proclamation; and the Statute of Proclamations 1539 provided that proclamations made by the king with the assent of the council should have the force of statute law if they were not prejudicial to "any person's inheritance, offices, liberties, goods, chattels or life". But this enactment was repealed by the Treason Act 1547; and it is certain that a proclamation purporting to be made in the exercise of legislative power by which the sovereign imposes a duty to which the subject is not by law liable, or prohibits under penalties what is not an offence at law, or adds fresh penalties to any offence, is of no effect unless itself issued in virtue of statutory authority (see also Order in Council).

The Crown has power to legislate by proclamation for a newly conquered country (Jenkyns, British Rule and Jurisdiction beyond the Seas); and this power was freely exercised in North America following the Seven Years' War by the Royal Proclamation of 1763 and in the Transvaal Colony during the Second Boer War 1899–1902. In the British colonies, ordinances were frequently brought into force by proclamation; certain imperial acts did not take effect in a colony until they were proclaimed (e.g. the Foreign Enlistment Act 1870); and proclamations were constantly issued in furtherance of executive acts. In many British protectorates the high commissioner or administrator was empowered to legislate by proclamation.

In the old system of real property law in England, fines, levied with "proclamations", i.e., with successive public announcements of the transaction in open court, barred the rights of strangers, as well as parties, in case they had not made claim to the property conveyed within five years thereafter (acts 1483–1484 and 1488–1489). These proclamations were originally made sixteen times: four times in the term in which the fine was levied, and four times in each of the three succeeding terms. Afterwards the number of proclamations was reduced to one in each of the four terms. The proclamations were endorsed on the back of the record. The system was abolished by the Fines and Recoveries Act 1833.

On certain rare occasions, the heralds of the College of Arms and the Lyon Court (or somebody else assigned to) still publicly read out certain proclamations such as the proclamation regarding the dissolution of Parliament or proclamations regarding the monarch's coronation, where they are read at the steps of the Royal Exchange in London and at the Mercat Cross in Edinburgh.

== United States ==
The president of the United States communicates information on holidays, commemorations, special observances, trade, and policy through proclamations. After the president signs a proclamation, the White House sends it to the Office of the Federal Register (OFR). The OFR numbers each proclamation consecutively as part of a series and publishes it in the daily Federal Register shortly after receipt.

== See also ==
- Proclamation of accession of Elizabeth II
- Proclamation of accession of Charles III
- Proclamation of the People's Republic of China
- Proclamation Day
- Proclamation For the Encouragement of Piety and Virtue
- Proclamation of the Irish Republic
- Decree
- Edict
- Letters patent
- Presidential proclamation
- Proclamation of Independence of the Democratic Republic of Vietnam
- Proclamation of Indonesian Independence
- Royal Proclamation of 2003
