= See of Rome Act 1536 =

Act of the Parliament of England

- Act of Parliament
- Parliament of England
- Long title: An Act extinguishing the authority of the bishop of Rome.
- Citation: 28 Hen. 8. c. 10
- Territorial extent: England and Wales

Dates
- Royal assent: 18 July 1536
- Commencement: 8 June 1536 (Note: Start of session.)
- Repealed: 12 November 1554
Other legislation
Amended by	Treason Act 1547
Repealed by	Second Statute of Repeal
Relates to	Statute of Praemunire 1392; Act of Supremacy 1558

Status: Repealed

Text of statute as originally enacted

The See of Rome Act 1536 (28 Hen. 8. c. 10) was an act of the Parliament of England passed in 1536. It consisted mostly of a violent attack on the authority of the Pope and his followers, and declared that those who committed the following offences would be liable for prosecution under the Statute of Praemunire 1392 (16 Ric. 2. c. 5):

If any person or persons ... shall, by writing, ciphering, printing, preaching or teaching, deed or act, obstinately or maliciously hold or stand with to extol, set forth, maintain or defend the authority, jurisdiction or power of the bishop of Rome or of his see, heretofore used, claimed or usurped within this realm ... or by any pretence obstinately or maliciously invent anything for the extolling, advancement, setting forth, maintenance or defence of the same or any part thereof, or by any pretence obstinately or maliciously attribute any manner of jurisdiction, authority or preeminence to the said see of Rome, or to any bishop of the same see for the time being, within this realm ... that then every such person or persons so doing or offending ... being thereof lawfully convicted according to the laws of this realm, for every such default and offence shall incur and run into the dangers, penalties, pains and forfeitures ordained and provided by the statute of provision and praemunire made in the sixteenth year of the reign of the noble and valiant prince King Richard II against such as attempt, procure or make provision to the see of Rome or elsewhere for any thing or things to the derogation, or contrary to the prerogative royal or jurisdiction, of the Crown and dignity of this realm.

The act also required all religious and secular officers, those taking Holy Orders, and those starting a degree at university to take an oath renouncing the jurisdiction of Rome and acknowledging Royal Supremacy. Refusing to take the oath was high treason until 1547 with the passing of the Treason Act 1547 (1 Edw. 6. c. 12)

== Subsequent developments ==
The whole act was repealed in 1554 by section 4 of the Second Statute of Repeal (1 & 2 Ph. & M. c. 8). This repeal was confirmed by section 4 of the Act of Supremacy 1558 (1 Eliz. 1. c. 1).

== Bibliography ==
- G. R. Elton, The Tudor Constitution: Second Edition (Cambridge University Press, 1982).
