= Act for the Advancement of True Religion =

Act of the Parliament of England

Advancement of True Religion Act 1542
- Act of Parliament
- Parliament of England
- Long title: An Act for the Advancement of true Religion, and for the Abolishment of the contrary.
- Citation: 34 & 35 Hen. 8. c. 1
- Territorial extent: England and Wales

Dates
- Royal assent: 12 May 1543
- Commencement: 3 November 1542 (Note: Start of session.)
- Repealed: 4 November 1547
Other legislation
Repealed by	Treason Act 1547

Status: Repealed

Text of statute as originally enacted

The Act for the Advancement of True Religion (34 & 35 Hen. 8. c. 1) was an act of the Parliament of England passed on 12 May 1543. Its intent was to quash the possession and reading of Tyndale's translations of scripture by "the lower sortes", and any commentary that spread doctrines contrary to Henry's theology, particularly relating to the eucharist and baptism.

It restricted the reading of the English Bible to clerics, noblemen, the gentry and richer merchants, and foreshadowed the promulgation of future authorised versions. Women below gentry rank, servants, apprentices and generally poor people were forbidden to read it, and certainly not to others. Women of the gentry and the nobility were only allowed to read it in private.

The act allowed moral plays to be performed if they promoted virtue and condemned vice but such plays were forbidden to contradict the interpretation of Scripture as set forth by the King.

The act claims that "malicious minds have, intending to subvert the true exposition of Scripture, have taken upon them, by printed ballads, rhymes, etc., subtilly and craftily to instruct His Highness' people, and specially the youth of this his realm, untruly. For reformation whereof, His Majesty considereth it most requisite to purge his realm of all such books, ballads, rhymes, and songs, as be pestiferous and noisome". However, the act also commanded that "all books printed before the year 1540, entituled Statutes, Chronicles, Canterbury Tales, Geoffrey Chaucer's books, John Gower's books, and stories of men's lives, shall not be comprehended in the prohibition of this Act".

== Subsequent developments ==
The act was repealed under Henry's son, Edward VI by section 2 of the Treason Act 1547 (1 Edw. 6. c. 12).
