= Edward Powell (martyr) =

Welsh Roman Catholic monk and martyr (c.1478 – 1540)

Edward Powell (c.1478 – 30 July 1540) was a Welsh Roman Catholic priest and theologian, in opposition to King Henry VIII. He is a Catholic martyr, beatified in 1886.

== Life ==
Powell was born in Wales. He was M.A. of the University of Oxford, and a Fellow of Oriel College in 1495. He received the degree of Doctor of Divinity on 26 June 1506 and was styled perdoctus vir by the university. He was rector of Bleadon, Somerset, and prebendary of Centum Solidorum in Lincoln, which he exchanged for Carlton-cum-Thurlby in 1505, and the latter for Sutton-in-Marisco in 1525. He also held the prebends of Lyme Regis, Calstock, Bedminster, and St Mary Redcliffe, Bristol, and the living of St. Edmond's, Salisbury.

A court preacher in high favour with Henry VIII, he helped the King write Assertio Septem Sacramentorum, a reply to Martin Luther, and then published his own work on the subject in December 1523. The University of Oxford commended this work, and styled Powell "the glory of the university" in a letter to the king. Powell was one of the four theologians selected to defend the legality of the marriage of Catherine of Aragon, in connection with which he wrote the "Tractatus de non dissolvendo Henrici Regis cum Catherina matrimonio" (London).

In March, 1533, Powell was selected to answer Hugh Latimer at Bristol, and was alleged to have disparaged his moral character. Latimer complained to Thomas Cromwell, and Powell fell into further disfavour by denouncing Henry's marriage with Anne Boleyn. He was discharged from the proctorship of Salisbury in January, 1534, and in November he was attainted, together with John Fisher, for high treason in refusing to take the oath of succession, deprived of his benefices, and imprisoned in the Tower of London. His keeper was sent to the Marshalsea Prison for allowing Powell and Thomas Abel out on bail.

The sentence was not carried out until 30 July 1540. Three Catholics (Powell, Abel, and Richard Featherstone) and three Protestants suffered together. The victims were dragged on hurdles from the Tower to Smithfield, a Catholic and a Protestant on each hurdle. Powell's companion was Robert Barnes, the Protestant divine. A dialogue in verse was published shortly after, "The Metynge of Doctor Barnes and Dr. Powell at Paradise Gate and of theyre communicacion bothe drawen to Smithfylde fro the Towar" (London, 1540), in the British Museum. The Catholics were hanged, drawn, and quartered as traitors; the others were burned as heretics.
