= Treason Act 1547 =

Act of the Parliament of England

- Act of Parliament
- Parliament of England
- Long title: An Act for the Repeal of certain Statutes concerning Treasons, Felonies, &c.
- Citation: 1 Edw. 6. c. 12
- Territorial extent: Great Britain; England and Wales

Dates
- Royal assent: 24 December 1547
- Commencement: 4 November 1547 (Note: Start of session)
- Repealed: 30 July 1948

Other legislation
- Amends: Treason Act 1399; Treason Act 1423; Treason Act 1429; Poisoning Act 1530; See of Rome Act 1536
- Repeals/revokes: Heresy Act 1382; Suppression of Heresy Act 1414; Heresy Act 1533; Proclamation by the Crown Act 1539; Statute of the Six Articles; Act for the Advancement of True Religion; Proclamations Act 1542; Religion Act 1543
- Amended by: Treason Act 1708; Treason (Ireland) Act 1821; Juries Act 1825; Criminal Statutes Repeal Act 1827; Statute Law Revision Act 1888
- Repealed by: Offences Against the Person Act 1828; Criminal Law (India) Act 1828; Felony Act 1841; Statute Law Revision Act 1863; Statute Law Revision Act 1887; Administration of Estates Act 1925; Statute Law Revision Act 1948
- Relates to: Treason Act 1351; Poisoning Act 1530; Forging the Sign-manual, etc. Act 1535; Treason Act 1554

Status: Repealed

Text of statute as originally enacted

The Treason Act 1547 (1 Edw. 6. c. 12) was an act of the Parliament of England. It is mainly notable for being the first instance of the rule that two witnesses are needed to prove a charge of treason, a rule which still exists today in the United States Constitution.

== Provisions ==
=== Abolition of new offences ===
During the reign of Henry VIII (r. 1509–1547), the statute books had proliferated with legislation creating numerous new forms of high treason. In the first year of the reign of his successor, Edward VI, Parliament passed this act, which abolished all kinds of treason except:

1. those contained in this act, (Note: Section 1.)
2. those in the original Treason Act 1351 (25 Edw. 3 Stat. 5. c. 2), (Note: Section 1.) and
3. treason consisting of counterfeiting coinage or forging the king's seals. (Note: Section 7.)

However the act expressly did not apply to people who had already been indicted for treason or misprision of treason.

Section 2 of the act repealed six enactments, relating to doctrine and matter of religion, namely:

- The Heresy Act 1382 (5 Ric. 2. Stat. 2. c. 5) (Note: The text of the act incorrectly cites this as "the Statute made in the first yere of the Reigne of the Kings noble progenito Kinge Richarde the Second".)
- The Suppression of Heresy Act 1414 (2 Hen. 5. Stat. 1. c. 7)
- The Heresy Act 1533 (25 Hen. 8. c. 14)
- The Statute of the Six Articles (31 Hen. 8. c. 14)
- The Proclamations Act 1542 (34 & 35 Hen. 8. c. 23)
- The Religion Act 1543 (35 Hen. 8. c. 5)

Section 3 of the act repealed all new felonies made by statute since 25 April 1509 (1 Hen. 8).

Section 4 of the act abolished all new felonies created in Henry's reign, repealing the Proclamation by the Crown Act 1539 (31 Hen. 8. c. 8) and the Proclamations Act 1542 (34 & 35 Hen. 8. c. 23).

Section 7 of the act provided that nothing in the act would repeal acts relating to counterfeit coinage or forging the king's seals, including Forging the Sign-manual, etc. Act 1535 (27 Hen. 8. c. 2).

=== Two witnesses rule ===
Section 22 of the act prescribed that in order to indict, arraign or convict a person for high treason, petty treason, or misprision of treason, they must be "accused by two sufficient and lawful witnesses." However, the witnesses did not have to have witnessed the same overt act of the offence.

This rule was abolished in 1554, except for treason under the Treason Act 1554 (1 & 2 Ph. & M. c. 10). However, it was later adopted in the Sedition Act 1661 (13 Cha. 2 St. 1. c. 1) and the Treason Act 1695 (7 & 8 Will. 3. c. 3), the latter of which was inherited by the United States due to its origins as part of the British Empire. In 1787, a version of the two witnesses rule was included in Article III of the U.S. Constitution (section 3), which added that both witnesses had to have witnessed the same overt act. Article III reads: "No Person shall be convicted of Treason unless on the Testimony of two Witnesses to the same overt Act, or on Confession in open Court."

The rule as stated in the 1695 act was extended to Scotland in 1709 by section 3 of the Treason Act 1708 (7 Ann. c. 21) and to Ireland in 1821 by the Treason (Ireland) Act 1821 (1 & 2 Geo. 4. c. 24), although in 1800 the rule was abolished for cases of attempting to assassinate the king by the Treason Act 1800 (39 & 40 Geo. 3 c. 93). It remained in force in Great Britain (from 1821 the whole United Kingdom) until 1945, when it was repealed by section 2 of, and the schedule to, the Treason Act 1945 (8 & 9 Geo. 6. c. 44).

During the passage of the Treason Bill through Parliament in 1945, the Home Secretary, Sir Donald Somervell, explained the repeal of the rule as follows:

It is, presumably, based on the idea that one witness may be unreliable, whereas, on the other hand, if you allege two overt acts, and if you have one witness of each, then the two unreliabilities are taken as adding up to a sufficient certainty. It was very much criticised from the moment it was enacted.

=== New offences under the act ===
The act created three new kinds of high treason:

1. Saying that the king was not the Supreme Head of the Church was a misdemeanour, a second such offence was a felony, and a third offence was treason. To say so in writing was treason for a first offence.
2. To attempt to deprive the king or his successors of his title, or to say that somebody else should be king, was treason.
3. Interrupting the succession to the throne, as established by the Act of Succession 1543 (35 Hen. 8. c. 1), was treason.

These provisions were all repealed by the Treason Act 1553 (1 Mar. Sess. 1. c. 1), the first act to be passed in the reign of Mary I. However the second on the above list was soon re-enacted in the Treason Act 1554 (1 & 2 Ph. & M. c. 10). The 1554 act also made it an offence to say that the king or queen should not have their title, which was punishable by "perpetual imprisonment" for a first offence and treason on the second offence, or treason on the first offence if done in writing.

=== Other provisions ===
Section 10 of the act removed benefit of clergy for the crimes of murder, housebreaking, horse stealing, highway robbery, and sacrilege, retaining it for other crimes. Section 14 of the act created a privilege of Parliament by extending benefit of clergy to all peers, even illiterates, for a first offence of any felony except murder and treason, exempting even the substitute penalties (burning the hand, loss of inheritance, corruption of the blood). Section 15 confirmed peers' right to be tried by the Lords.

Section 5 of the act repealed the Statute of Proclamations (also known as Proclamation by the Crown Act 1539 (31 Hen. 8. c. 8)), that had ordained that most Proclamations issued by the King in Council should be obeyed as though they were acts of Parliament.

Section 19 of the act stipulated that a prosecution for treason consisting only of "open preaching or words only" must be brought within 30 days of the offence (or six months if the accused was outside the realm).

Section 20 of the act put the common law offence of misprision (concealing) of treason on a statutory basis.

Section 21 of the act made it lawful to address the King of France by that title. Up until then, the English kings had claimed that title for themselves (and did not formally renounce it until 1801).

== Subsequent developments ==
Section 1, 3–11, 14 and 18 to the end of the act were repealed by section 1 of, and the schedule to, the Statute Law Revision Act 1863 (26 & 27 Vict. c. 125), which came into force on 28 July 1863.

Section 16 of the act was repealed by section 56 of, and part I of schedule 2 to, the Administration of Estates Act 1925 (15 & 16 Geo. 5. c. 23), which came into force on 1 January 1926.

The whole act, so far as unrepealed, was repealed by section 1 of, and the first schedule to, the Statute Law Revision Act 1948 (11 & 12 Geo. 6. c. 62), which came into force on 30 July 1948.

== See also ==
- High treason in the United Kingdom
- Benefit of clergy
