= Richard Fetherston =

English Roman Catholic priest and martyr (died 1540)

Richard Fetherston (Fetherstone, Featherstone) was an English Roman Catholic priest. He was Archdeacon of Brecon, Chaplain to Catharine of Aragon, and Latin tutor to her daughter, Mary Tudor. He was executed on 30 July 1540 and beatified by Pope Leo XIII on 29 December 1886.

== Life ==
Richard Featherstone studied at Cambridge where he became a doctor of divinity. In 1523 he was appointed archdeacon of Brecon in South Wales. By 1525 he had become the Princess Mary's Latin tutor (he remained in this role until at least 1533). When the Convocation of Canterbury met in November 1529 and considered whether Henry VIII and Queen Catherine were truly married, he spoke in defence of the marriage. The Act of Parliament which condemned St John Fisher in 1534 for his refusal to take the Oath of Succession, also referred to Fetherstone, who was sent to the Tower of London on 13 December of the same year. There he was confined until his execution in 1540.

He was hanged, drawn, and quartered at Smithfield on 30 July, together with the Catholic theologians Thomas Abel and Edward Powell, who, like himself had spoken on behalf Queen Catharine and had themselves been kept in the Tower for nearly six years. They were executed with three others, Robert Barnes, Thomas Garret, and William Jerome, who were condemned for teaching Zwinglianism. All six were drawn through the streets upon three hurdles, a Catholic and a Protestant on each hurdle. The Protestants were burned, and the three Catholics executed in the usual manner, their limbs being fixed over the gates of the city and their heads being placed upon poles on London Bridge.
