= List of acts of the Parliament of England from 1547 =

This is a list of acts of the Parliament of England for the year 1547.

For acts passed during the period 1707–1800, see the list of acts of the Parliament of Great Britain. See also the list of acts of the Parliament of Scotland, and the list of acts of the Parliament of Ireland.

For acts passed from 1801 onwards, see the list of acts of the Parliament of the United Kingdom. For acts of the devolved parliaments and assemblies in the United Kingdom, see the list of acts of the Scottish Parliament, the list of acts of the Northern Ireland Assembly, and the list of acts and measures of Senedd Cymru; see also the list of acts of the Parliament of Northern Ireland.

For medieval statutes, etc. that are not considered to be acts of Parliament, see the list of English statutes.

See also the List of ordinances and acts of the Parliament of England, 1642–1660 for ordinances and acts passed by the Long Parliament and other bodies without royal assent, and which were not considered to be valid legislation following the Restoration in 1660.

The number shown after each act's title is its chapter number. Acts are cited using this number, preceded by the years of the reign during which the relevant parliamentary session was held; thus the Union with Ireland Act 1800 is cited as "39 & 40 Geo. 3. c. 67", meaning the 67th act passed during the session that started in the 39th year of the reign of George III and which finished in the 40th year of that reign. The modern convention is to use Arabic numerals in citations (thus "41 Geo. 3" rather than "41 Geo. III"). Acts of the last session of the Parliament of Great Britain and the first session of the Parliament of the United Kingdom are both cited as "41 Geo. 3".

Acts passed by the Parliament of England did not have a short title; however, some of these acts have subsequently been given a short title by acts of the Parliament of the United Kingdom, such as the Short Titles Act 1896 (59 & 60 Vict. c. 14).

Acts passed by the Parliament of England were deemed to have come into effect on the first day of the session in which they were passed. Because of this, the years given in the list below may in fact be the year before a particular act was passed.

== 1547 (1 Edw. 6) ==
The first session of the 1st Parliament of King Edward VI, which met from 4 November 1547 until 24 December 1547.

This session was also traditionally cited as 1 Ed. 6.

=== Public acts ===
Short title	Citation	Royal assent
Long title
Sacrament Act 1547	1 Edw. 6. c. 1	24 December 1547
An Act against such as shall unreverently speak against the Sacrament of the body and blood of Christ commonly called the Sacrament of the Altar, and for the receiving thereof in both Kinds.
Election of Bishops Act 1547 (repealed)	1 Edw. 6. c. 2	24 December 1547
An Act for the election of Bishops and what Seals and Style they and other Spiritual persons exercising Jurisdiction Ecclesiastical shall use. (Repealed for England and Wales by Statute Law Revision Act 1863 (26 & 27 Vict. c. 125) and for Northern Ireland by Statute Law Revision Act 1950 (14 Geo. 6. c. 6))
Vagabonds Act 1547 or the Vagrancy Act 1547 (repealed)	1 Edw. 6. c. 3	24 December 1547
An Act for the punishment of Vagabonds, and for the Relief of the poor and impotent Persons. (Repealed by Statute Law Revision Act 1863 (26 & 27 Vict. c. 125))
Tenures Act 1547 (repealed)	1 Edw. 6. c. 4	24 December 1547
An Act for Tenures holden in Capite. (Repealed by Statute Law Revision Act 1863 (26 & 27 Vict. c. 125))
Exportation Act 1547 (repealed)	1 Edw. 6. c. 5	24 December 1547
An Act that no Horses shall be conveyed out of this Realm, and other the King's Majesty's Dominions, without Licence. (Repealed by Repeal of Acts Concerning Importation Act 1822 (3 Geo. 4. c. 41))
Worsted Yarn Act 1547 (repealed)	1 Edw. 6. c. 6	24 December 1547
An Act for the Continuance of making of Worsted yarn in Norff. (Repealed by Repeal of Obsolete Statutes Act 1856 (19 & 20 Vict. c. 64))
Justices of the Peace Act 1547 (repealed)	1 Edw. 6. c. 7	24 December 1547
An Acte for the contynuance of Actions after the deathe of anny King of this Realme. (Repealed by Justices of the Peace Act 1968 (c. 69))
Confirmation of Grants Act 1547 (repealed)	1 Edw. 6. c. 8	24 December 1547
An Act for the Confirmation of Letters Patents. (Repealed by Statute Law Revision Act 1948 (11 & 12 Geo. 6. c. 62))
York (Reduction of Churches) Act 1547 (repealed)	1 Edw. 6. c. 9	24 December 1547
An Act for the Uniting of certain Churches in the City of Yorke. (Repealed by Statute Law Revision Act 1948 (11 & 12 Geo. 6. c. 62))
Exigents, etc. in Wales and Cheshire Act 1547 (repealed)	1 Edw. 6. c. 10	24 December 1547
An Act for Exigents and Proclamations in Wales, and in the County Palatine of Chester. (Repealed by Administration of Justice (Miscellaneous Provisions) Act 1938 (1 & 2 Geo. 6. c. 63))
Acts During King's Nonage Act 1547 (repealed)	1 Edw. 6. c. 11	24 December 1547
An Act for the repeal of a certain Statute made in the xxviii^{th} Year of the Reign of the late King of most famous memory, Henry the Eighth, for revoking Acts of Parliament. (Note: Acts During King's Nonage Act 1536 (28 Hen. 8. c. 17)) (Repealed by Minority of Successor to Crown Act 1750 (24 Geo. 2. c. 24))
Treason Act 1547 (repealed)	1 Edw. 6. c. 12	24 December 1547
An Act for the Repeal of certain Statutes concerning Treasons, Felonies, and Clergy. (Repealed by Offences Against the Person Act 1828 (9 Geo. 4. c. 31), Criminal Law (India) Act 1828 (9 Geo. 4. c. 74), Felony Act 1841 (4 & 5 Vict. c. 22), Statute Law Revision Act 1863 (26 & 27 Vict. c. 125), Statute Law Revision Act 1887 (50 & 51 Vict. c. 59), Administration of Estates Act 1925 (15 & 16 Geo. 5. c. 23) and Statute Law Revision Act 1948 (11 & 12 Geo. 6. c. 62))
Taxation Act 1547 (repealed)	1 Edw. 6. c. 13	24 December 1547
An Act for a Subsidy of Tonnage and Poundage of Merchandizes, with a Proviso for the Stilliarde. (Repealed by Statute Law Revision Act 1863 (26 & 27 Vict. c. 125))
Dissolution of Colleges Act 1547 or the Abolition of Chantries Act 1547 or the Chantries Act 1547 (repealed)	1 Edw. 6. c. 14	24 December 1547
An Acte wherby certaine Chauntries Colleges Free Chapelles and the Possessions of the same be given to the Kinges Majestie. (Repealed by Charities Act 1960 (8 & 9 Eliz. 2. c. 58))
Act of General Pardon 1547 (repealed)	1 Edw. 6. c. 15	24 December 1547
An Act for a General Pardon. (Repealed by Statute Law Revision Act 1863 (26 & 27 Vict. c. 125))

=== Private acts ===
Short title	Citation	Royal assent
Long title
Establishment of Wells Deanery.	1 Edw. 6. c. 1 Pr.	24 December 1547
An Act for an Establishment of a Deanry at Wells.
Assurance of lands to Crown from Earl of Rutland.	1 Edw. 6. c. 2 Pr.	24 December 1547
An Act for the Assurance of certain Lands to the King's Majesty, from the Earl of Rutlande.
Assurance of lands to Lord Riche and Sir William Shelley.	1 Edw. 6. c. 3 Pr.	24 December 1547
An Act for the Assurance of certain Lands to the Lord Riche, and Sir William Shelley, (Note: Sir William Shelley) Knight.
Restitution in blood of Lord Stafford.	1 Edw. 6. c. 4 Pr.	24 December 1547
An Act for the Restitution in Blood of the Lord Staff.
Restitution in blood of John Lumley.	1 Edw. 6. c. 5 Pr.	24 December 1547
An Act for the Restitution in Blood of John Lumley, Esquire.
Restitution in blood of Griffith Rise.	1 Edw. 6. c. 6 Pr.	24 December 1547
An Act for the Restitution in Blood of Griffithe Rise, Gent.

=== Sources ===
- "1° Edw. VI". The Statutes of the Realm. Vol. 4 Part 1: 1547 to 1584. pp. 1–35 – via Internet Archive.
- "1° Edw. VI". The Statutes of the Realm. Vol. 4 Part 1: 1547 to 1584. pp. 1–35 – via HathiTrust.
- "1° Edw. VI". The Statutes of the Realm. Vol. 4 Part 1: 1547 to 1584. pp. 1–35 – via Google Books.
- "Anno primo Edw. VI". The Statutes at Large. Vol. 5 – 32 Henry VIII to 7 Edward VI – 1540 to 1552–3. pp. 241–286 – via Internet Archive.
- Journal of the House of Commons. Vol. 1 – 1547-1629. His Majesty's Stationery Office. 1802 – via British History Online.
- Journal of the House of Lords. Vol. 1: 1509-1577. London: His Majesty's Stationery Office. 1830 – via British History Online.
- Chronological Table of and Index to the Statutes. Vol. 1: To the End of the Session 59 Vict. Sess. 2 (1895) (13th ed.). London: Her Majesty's Stationery Office. 1896. p. 54 – via Google Books.
- Chronological Table of the Statutes: Covering the Period from 1235 to the End of 1971. London: Her Majesty's Stationery Office. 1972. pp. 51–52. ISBN 978-0-11-840096-1 – via Google Books.
- "Chronological Tables of the Private and Personal Acts: Part 1 (1539–1601)". legislation.gov.uk. The National Archives.
- "Acts of the English Parliament from 1547". legislation.gov.uk. The National Archives.

== See also ==
- List of acts of the Parliament of England
