= Demise of the Crown Act =

Demise of the Crown Act may refer to

- Demise of the Crown Act 1702, Act of the Parliament of England
- Demise of the Crown Act 1727, Act of the Parliament of Great Britain
- Demise of the Crown Act 1901, Act of the Parliament of the United Kingdom
