= Breach of the peace =

Public disorder

Breach of the peace or disturbing the peace is a legal term used in constitutional law in English-speaking countries and in a public order sense in the United Kingdom. It is a form of disorderly conduct.

== Public order ==
=== England, Wales and Northern Ireland ===
In England and Wales, theoretically all criminal offences cognizable by English law involve "a breach of the King's peace", and all indictments formerly concluded "against the peace of our Lord the King, his crown and dignity" before the passage of the Indictments Act 1915 and the Rules that formed that Act's first schedule. The conclusion has also found its way into constitutional law in many United States state constitutions, which mandate that indictments within the state end in a similar manner to the above, usually omitting the "crown" part or substituting "government". For example, New Jersey's is "against the peace of this State, the government and dignity of the same".

Historically that concluding phrase, now legally superfluous, represents the last trace of the process by which the royal courts assume jurisdiction over all offences, and gradually eroded the jurisdiction of the sheriff and of lords of manor and franchises, making crime a matter of national concern as distinguished from civil wrongs or infractions of the rights of local magnates. The Peace of the King was sworn on his accession or full recognition, and the jurisdiction of his courts to punish all violations of that peace was gradually asserted. The completion of this process is marked by the institution of the office of Justice of the Peace.

In England, Wales and Northern Ireland, breach of the peace is descended from the Justices of the Peace Act 1361, which refers to riotous and barratous behaviour that disturbs the peace of the King. More modern authority defines a breach of the peace as "when a person reasonably believes harm will be caused, or is likely to be caused, to a person or in his presence to his property, or a person is in fear of being harmed through an assault, affray, riot, unlawful assembly, or some other form of disturbance".

The breach of the peace power of arrest is provided by the common law and therefore an 'any person' power of arrest and entry both within the same definition.

Section 17(5) of the Police and Criminal Evidence Act 1984 (PACE) abolished all powers of a Constable to enter under the common law with the specific exception (subsection 6) when dealing with or preventing a common law breach of the peace. This "offence" definition and power of arrest are contained under the common law definition of "breach of the peace". Breach of the peace powers are unusual, as they originate from the laws Alfred the Great, consolidated into the common law approximately 1,000 years before the modern constable. The first legislative reference to the common law breach of the peace was under the Justice of the Peace Act 1361.

In England and Wales, breach of the peace is a civil proceeding (rather than a criminal offence), although the case must be proved to the criminal standard of proof, 'beyond reasonable doubt', rather than the civil standard of proof, 'on the balance of probabilities'. Sometimes the Crown Prosecution Service conduct the case on behalf of the police, but the police service is liable for any costs awarded in favour or against the prosecutor. Breach of the peace is not an offence, in the sense that it is not punishable either by a fine or imprisonment either at statute or common law and nor do proceedings for breach of the peace give rise to any conviction. In England and Wales, constables (or other persons) are permitted to arrest a person to "prevent a further breach of the peace" which allows for the police or the public to arrest a person before a breach of the peace has occurred. This is permitted when it is reasonable to believe should the person remain, that they would continue with their course of conduct and that a breach of the peace would occur.

The only immediate sanction that can be imposed by a court for breach of the peace is to bind over the offender to keep the peace: that is, justices of the peace can require a person to enter into a recognizance to keep the peace. Any punishment (in the sense of a loss of freedom or permanent financial penalty) takes the form of loss of the surety if the defendant fails to keep the peace or be of good behaviour during the period for which he is bound over. The binding over itself does not amount to a conviction (but any following behaviour causing loss of the surety might well result in conviction for an associated offence). A failure to enter into a recognizance may of itself lead to a person being committed to custody under s.115(3) Magistrates' Courts Act 1980.

Nowadays a person causing a public disturbance may be arrested for, and/or charged with, causing harassment, alarm or distress contrary to the Public Order Act 1986.

=== Hong Kong ===
The concept of breaching the peace was imported into Hong Kong as part of the wholesale importation of English common law into the then British colony in 1841.

In Hong Kong, a person commits a breach of the peace when he "unlawfully resorts to violence which injures someone or damages property, or which threatens immediate danger of injury or damage to property in the presence of the targeted person or the owner of that property" (HKSAR v Lo Kin Man (2021) 24 HKCFAR 302 at para. 93).

A breach of the peace is not in its own a criminal offence, but any person, including the police, may arrest the person breaching the peace and bring them before a magistrate, who may subject the person to a bind-over order to keep the peace.

It is, however, an offence under section 17B(2) of the Public Order Ordinance to use, distribute, or display any threatening, abusive or insulting conduct in a public place with intent to provoke a breach of the peace or whereby a breach of the peace is likely to be caused. Offenders are liable to a fine of up to $5000 and imprisonment for 12 months.

=== Scotland ===
There are major differences between English law and Scots law with respect to dealing with breach of the peace; unlike England and Wales where criminal penalties apply to the behaviour leading to or liable to cause a breach of the peace, it is a specific criminal offence in Scotland which is prosecuted daily in the sheriff courts and due to its common law definition it can be applied to a number of scenarios. The maximum punishment if a case is remitted to the High Court remains imprisonment for life although such severe punishment is now rarely applied, usually being associated with breaches of licence during an existing life sentence.

Breach of the peace consists of "conduct severe enough to cause alarm to ordinary people and threaten serious disturbance to the community".

A constable may arrest any person, without warrant, who commits a breach of the peace. A member of the public may not arrest a person for behaviour which amounts to no more than a breach of the peace (i.e. an arrest is not always for the offence for which someone is eventually prosecuted but can be for a more serious crime that appears to be occurring).

Breach of the peace can include, but is not limited to, any riotous behaviours (which includes "rowdiness" or "brawling") and any disorderly behaviour. This behaviour need not be noisy but still of a nature that would cause concern to other people. Examples include persistently following someone, delivering threatening letters and "streaking" or "mooning".

One of the leading cases in Scots law is that of Smith v Donnelly, a case concerning a Faslane protester.

Section 38 of the Criminal Justice and Licensing (Scotland) Act 2010 created an offence of behaving in a threatening or abusive manner in a way likely to cause a reasonable person to suffer fear or alarm, similar to the Section 5 Public Order act in England and Wales. This subsists alongside breach of the peace.

=== United States ===
In the United States, prosecutions for breach of the peace are subject to constitutional constraints. In Terminiello v. City of Chicago (1949), the United States Supreme Court held that an ordinance of the City of Chicago that banned speech which "stirs the public to anger, invites dispute, brings about a condition of unrest, or creates a disturbance" was unconstitutional under the First Amendment to the United States Constitution. Justice Douglas stated: "Accordingly a function of free speech under our system of government is to invite dispute. It may indeed best serve its high purpose when it induces a condition of unrest, creates dissatisfaction with conditions as they are, or even stirs people to anger. Speech is often provocative and challenging. It may strike at prejudices and preconceptions and have profound unsettling effects as it presses for acceptance of an idea."

In Cox v. Louisiana (1965), the Supreme Court held that a Louisiana statute criminalizing breaches of the peace was unconstitutionally vague and overbroad because it would allow persons to be prosecuted for expressing unpopular views. The statute read in part:

Whoever with intent to provoke a breach of the peace, or under circumstances such that a breach of the peace may be occasioned thereby ... crowds or congregates with others ... in or upon ... a public street or public highway, or upon a public sidewalk, or any other public place or building ... and who fails or refuses to disperse and move on ... when ordered so to do by any law enforcement officer of any municipality, or parish, in which such act or acts are committed, or by any law enforcement officer of the state of Louisiana, or any other authorized person ... shall be guilty of disturbing the peace.

On the state level, at least one court has reasoned that the essence of a breach of the peace was the potential to cause a disruption in tranquility or to promote the threat of violence, stating that a breach of the peace was that which "disturbs or threatens to disturb the tranquility enjoyed by the citizens".

== See also ==
- Common scold
- Public nuisance
- King's Peace
- Rule according to higher law
- Common law offence § England and Wales
- Picking quarrels and provoking trouble
