= Binding over =

Legal power of criminal courts in England and Wales

In the law of England and Wales and some other common law jurisdictions, binding over is an exercise of certain powers by the criminal courts used to deal with low-level public order issues. Both magistrates' courts and the Crown Court may issue binding-over orders in certain circumstances.

== England and Wales ==
In a 1988 article in the Cambridge Law Journal, British legal commentator David Feldman describes the power to "bind people over to be of good behaviour or to keep the peace" as a useful and common device used in the criminal justice system of England and Wales, and explains the process as follows:

Magistrates form the view that a person ("the principal"), who might be a person of previously unblemished reputation, is likely to breach the peace or commit criminal offences. They require him to enter into a recognisance, in form of a voluntary covenant or agreement, to keep the peace, or to be of good behaviour, sometimes in a set sum (say £100) for a set period. If he refuses, he can be imprisoned, regardless of the seriousness or triviality, lawfulness or unlawfulness, of the behaviour that originally brought him to court, perhaps as a witness. He may also be required to find sureties, other people who are prepared to promise that they will forfeit a sum of money (say £50 each) if their principal fails to behave. If the principal misbehaves, debts to the Crown arise of £100 from the principal and £50 from each surety. The mechanics are therefore rather similar to bail. Binding over operates today in two ways. First, it can be used after conviction for an offence as an alternative to sentence. The accused enters into a recognisance to keep the peace or be of good behaviour. If he breaches his undertaking, he can be summoned back to court to be sentenced for the original offence. Secondly, it can be used as a preventive measure to deal with people who are before the court but have not been convicted. This latter use provides a flexible way to deal with cases arising out of disputes between neighbours and minor public order problems without the need for a full hearing. It saves time and money.

The origins of the binding-over power are rooted in (1) the takings of sureties of the peace, which "emerged from the peace-keeping arrangements of Anglo-Saxon law, extended by the use of the royal prerogative and royal writs", and (2) the separate device of sureties of good behaviour, which originated as a type of conditional pardon given by the king. The statutory authorization for binding-over powers is found in the Justices of the Peace Act 1361 (34 Edw. 3 c. 1) and s. 1(7) Justices of the Peace Act 1968 (c. 69). Part 11 of Chapter 5 of the Sentencing Act 2020 (c. 17) empowers the criminal courts, when sentencing a person under 18 years for an offence, to "order the parent or guardian to enter into a recognizance to take proper care of the offender and exercise proper control over the offender". Such an order cannot be made against a local authority acting in loco parentis.

== Hong Kong ==
Binding-over orders are a feature of the law of Hong Kong.

== See also ==
- Anti-social behaviour order
- Peace bond
- Probation
