= Justices of the Peace Act =

Stock short title used for legislation

Justices of the Peace Act is a stock short title used in New Zealand and the United Kingdom for legislation relating to justices of the peace.

== List ==
=== New Zealand ===
- The Justices of the Peace Act 1858 (21 & 22 Vict No 27)
- The Justices of the Peace Act 1957 (1957 No 89)

=== United Kingdom ===
- The Justices of the Peace Act 1361 (34 Edw. 3. c. 1)
- The Justices of the Peace Act 1547 (1 Edw. 6. c. 7)
- The Justices of the Peace Act 1867 (30 & 31 Vict. c. 115)
- The Justices of the Peace Act 1906 (6 Edw. 7. c. 16)
- The Justices of the Peace Act 1949 (12, 13 & 14 Geo. 6. c. 101)
- The Justices of the Peace Act 1965 (c. 28)
- The Justices of the Peace Act 1968 (c. 69)
- The Justices of the Peace Act 1979 (c. 55)
- The Justices of the Peace Act 1997 (c. 25)

The Justices Qualification Acts 1731 to 1875 was the collective title of the following acts:

- The Justices Qualification Act 1731 (5 Geo. 2. c. 18)
- The Justices Qualification Act 1744 (18 Geo. 2. c. 20)
- The Justices Qualification Act 1760 (1 Geo. 3. c. 13)
- The Justices Qualification (Scilly Islands) Act 1834 (4 & 5 Will. 4. c. 43)
- The Justices Qualification Act 1871 (34 & 35 Vict. c. 18)
- The Justices Qualification Act 1875 (38 & 39 Vict. c. 54)

== See also ==
- List of short titles
