= Demise of the Crown =

British and Commonwealth legal term for transfer of Crown

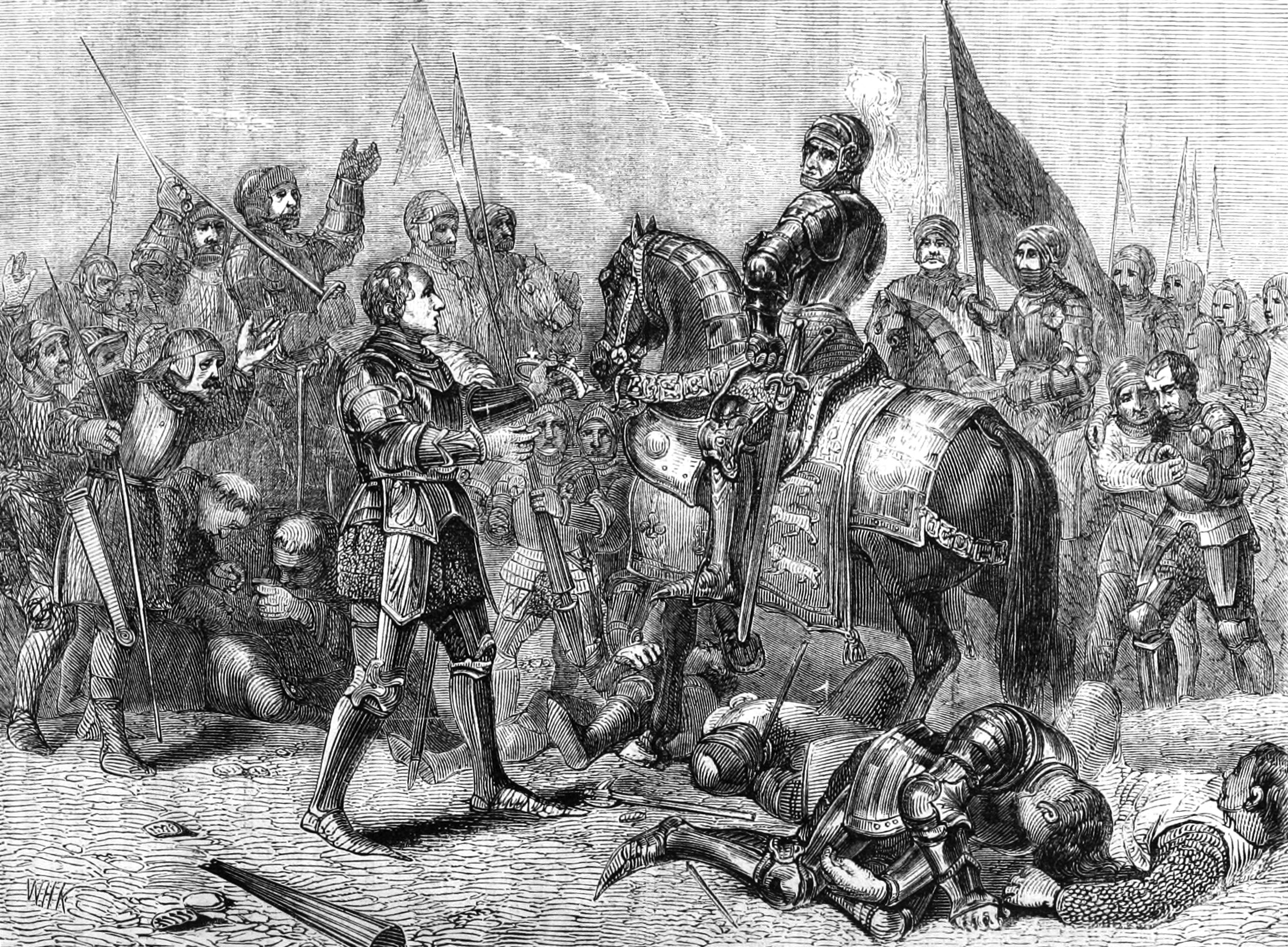
An early example of a demise of the Crown: following the Battle of Bosworth Field, Lord Stanley hands the crown of Richard III to Henry VII

Demise of the Crown is the legal term in the United Kingdom and the other Commonwealth realms for the transfer of the Crown upon the death or abdication of the monarch. The Crown transfers automatically to the monarch's heir. The concept evolved in the kingdom of England, and was continued in Great Britain and then the United Kingdom. The concept also became part of the constitutions of the British colonies, and was continued in the constitutions of the Commonwealth realms, until modified within those realms.

Originally, the demise of the Crown in England had significant legal effects: individuals who had been appointed to office by the deceased monarch lost their positions; if Parliament was sitting, it automatically dissolved; and actions in the royal courts automatically discontinued and had to be re-started. Almost all of these legal effects have been abolished by statutes of the British Parliament and the parliaments of the Commonwealth realms, so that the demise of the Crown no longer has much legal significance.

Although the concept of the demise of the Crown was originally based on the monarch's death, it was used in 1936 to describe the transfer of the Crown to George VI upon the abdication of Edward VIII, as the Act of Parliament that gave legal effect to the abdication specified that, upon the instrument of abdication taking effect, Edward VIII would cease to be King and there would be a demise of the Crown.

Other monarchies use different terminologies for the end of a reign.

If the monarch who dies or abdicates is the Queen and her successor is the King, references to 'Queen's' automatically changes to 'King's'. For example, lawyers in the Dominions of the Crown who are Queen's Counsel (Q.C.) at the time of the demise become King's Counsel (K.C.) without any need to seek new letters patent. The reverse is also true, as was the case from 6 February 1952 upon the death of King George VI, when living King's Counsel became Queen's Counsel.

== English origins ==
=== Meaning of the term ===
The term "demise" was originally a law French term used for the transfer of real property, whether by lease or sale. Blackstone notes that this term for the transfer of property then became used on the death of the monarch to mean "the kingdom is transferred or demised to his successor". "Demise" in this sense is not referring to the monarch's death, but to the automatic transfer of the monarchy to the heir, by operation of law:

A THIRD attribute of the king's majesty is his perpetuity. The law ascribes to him, in his political capacity, an absolute immortality. The king never dies. Henry, Edward, or George may die; but the king survives them all. For immediately upon the decease of the reigning prince in his natural capacity, his kingship or imperial dignity, by act of law, without any interregnum or interval, is vested at once in his heir, who is, eo instanti, king to all intents and purposes.

=== Historical effects of the demise of the Crown ===
The historical effects of the demise of the Crown were the result of the personal nature of the monarch as head of government in the medieval period. The legislative, executive and judicial functions of government all flowed from the monarch's personal authority. The monarch's death therefore affected all aspects of the monarchical government.

==== Dissolution of Parliament ====
A demise resulted in the immediate dissolution of Parliament. Parliaments were summoned at the will of the king, and dissolved by the king, at his personal decision. Upon the death of the king, the king's parliament dissolved. It was up to the next king to decide whether to call a parliament, and when it would be called.

==== Offices became vacant ====
All Crown offices appointed by the monarch immediately became vacant upon the demise of the Crown. The principle applied to the Great Officers of State, such as the Lord Chancellor, the Lord High Treasurer, the Earl Marshal, and the Lord High Admiral. All of these officials held their positions by virtue of the personal appointment by the monarch, and became vacant on the death of the monarch. Lesser royal offices also became vacant upon a demise. As all royal servants were appointed by, and served, the monarch, that service would end upon the death of the monarch. The cumbersome effect of the entire royal service losing office was mitigated by a practice which evolved of lesser royal officials being continued in office, provided they swore allegiance to the new monarch. However, this practice did not initially apply to the great officers of state, who were the core of the monarch's government. The new monarch selected his own great officers.

==== Discontinuance of legal actions ====
The demise of the Crown also brought to an end all existing proceedings in the royal courts. The reason was that proceedings in those courts were instituted by means of writs issued in the king's name and authority. When the monarch died, that authority lapsed. The practice evolved of allowing a litigant to re-commence the action, but at the cost of paying for a new writ. The first reform to this aspect of the demise of the Crown was a statute enacted immediately after the accession of Edward VI, after the lengthy reign of his father, Henry VIII. Parliament passed a statute providing that plaintiffs did not have to recommence their actions.

== British reforms ==
=== Reforms of the late Stuart period (1695–1707) ===
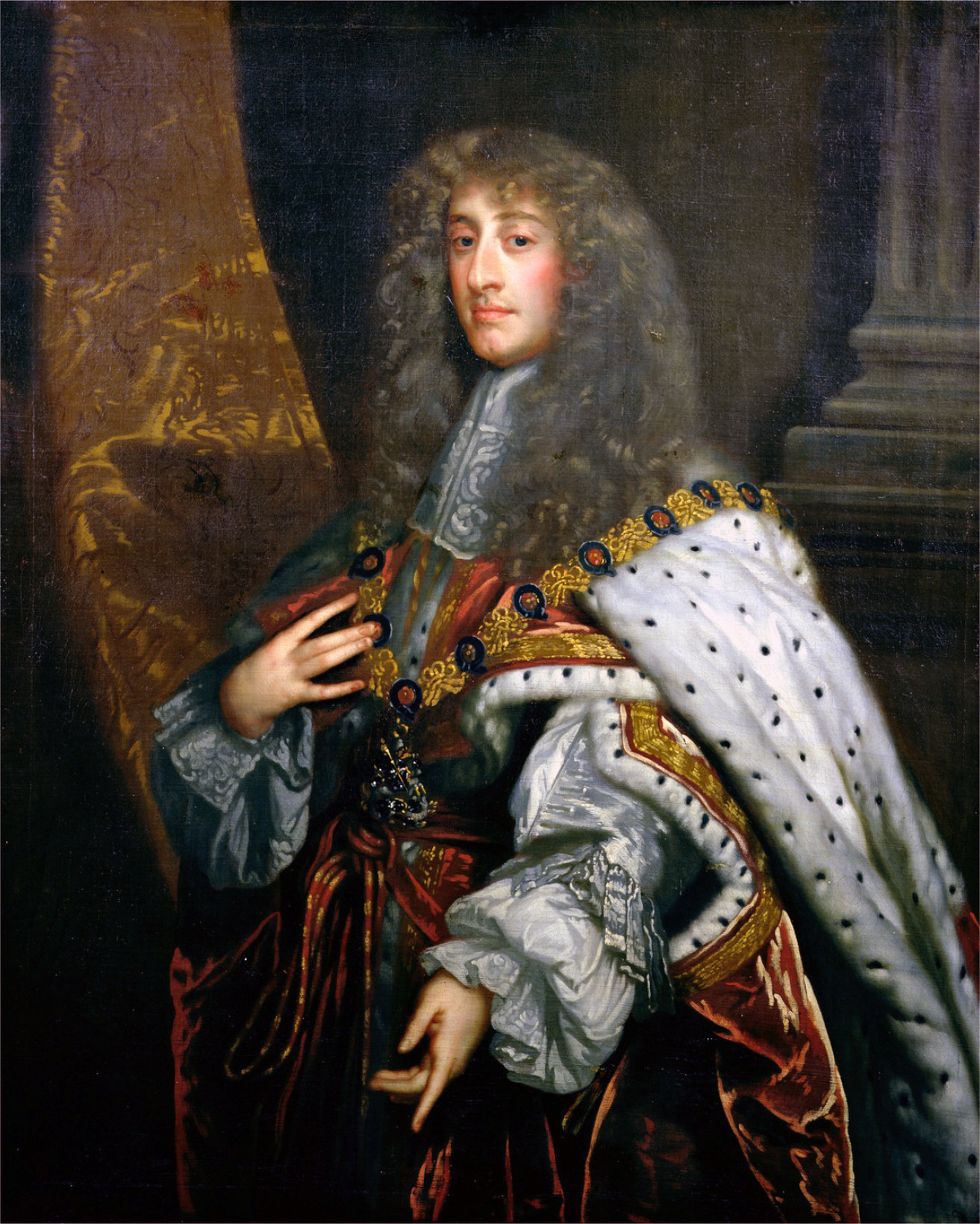
James II (reigned 1685–1688)

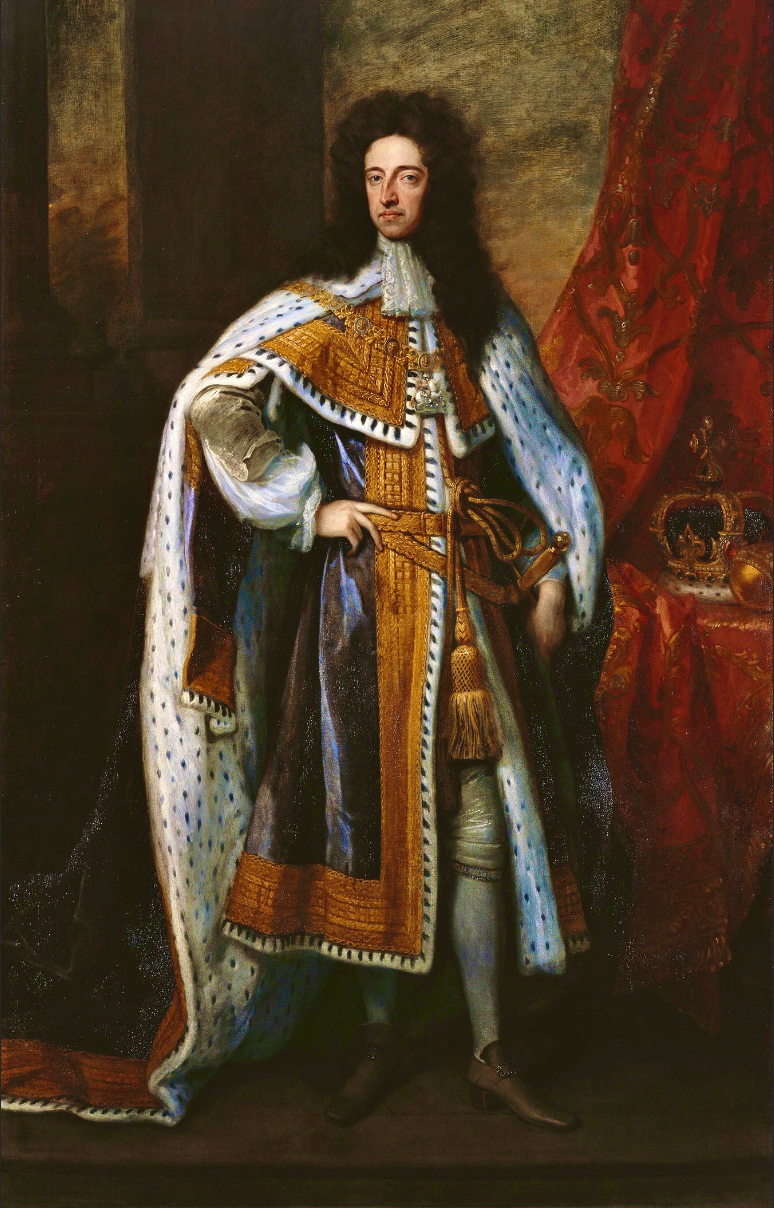
William III (reigned 1689–1702)

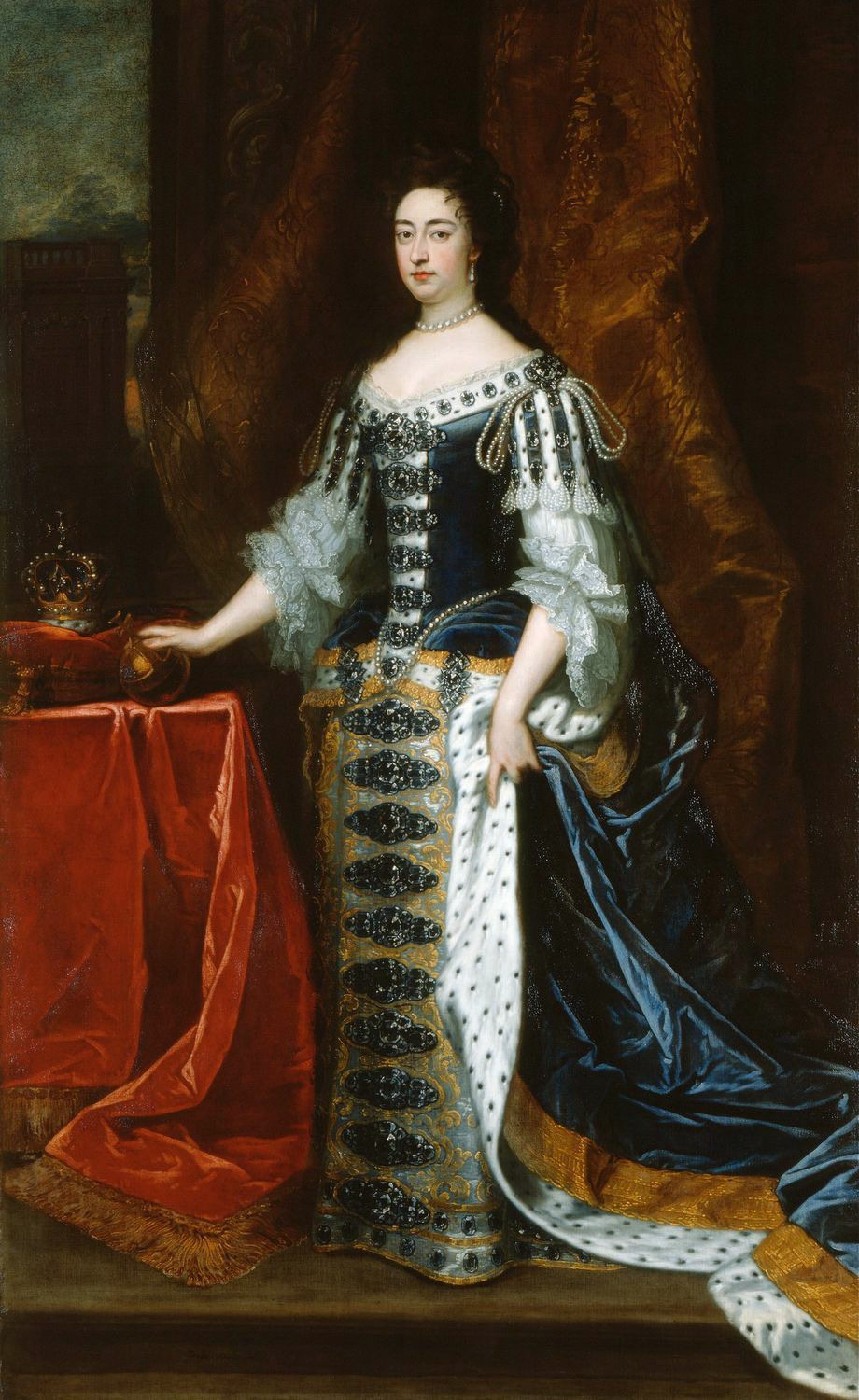
Mary II (reigned 1689–1694)

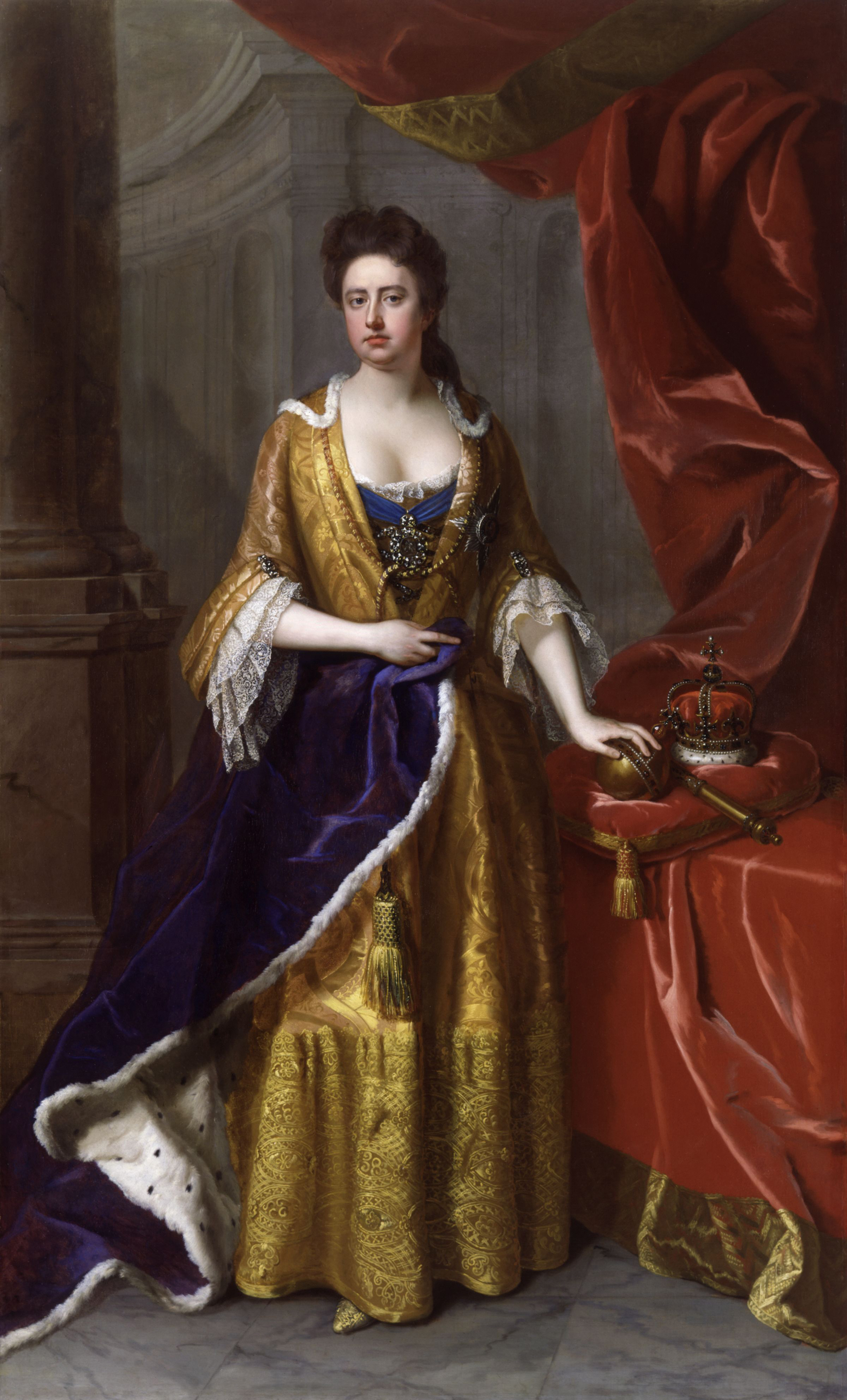
Anne (reigned 1702–1714)

Following the Glorious Revolution, the flight of James II with his infant son Prince James to France, and the installation of William III and Mary II as joint monarchs, there was political unrest in Britain. The legal effects of the demise of the Crown took on much greater political significance, as explained by Arthur Berriedale Keith, a Scottish constitutional expert:

The practical inconvenience, and even danger, to which the legal theory might give rise became evident in the reign of Anne. In all probability the successor to the Crown, designated by Statute, would be in Hanover at the moment of the Queen’s death. A rival claimant to the Crown was no farther off than St. Germains [near Paris], and at this critical time the Privy Council would be dissolved, all the great offices of State would be vacant, and every commission in the Army would have lapsed.

In response to this situation, the English Parliament enacted laws to preserve royal officials in office, notwithstanding the demise of the Crown. The first law, the Security of King and Government Act 1695, was enacted after the death of Queen Mary. It provided that upon the death of King William, office-holders would continue in office for six months, unless the new monarch, Queen Anne, chose to dismiss them. After William's death in 1702 and the accession of Queen Anne, Parliament enacted another law dealing more generally with the issues relating to the demise, the Demise of the Crown Act 1702. That act confirmed that office-holders stayed in office for six months, provided they swore oaths of allegiance to Anne. The 1702 act made clear that the new rule applied to all subsequent demises. In 1707, the new British Parliament passed the Succession to the Crown Act 1707, confirming that the Privy Council could continue to function upon a demise.

The same concern arose with respect to Parliament: upon a demise, Parliament would automatically dissolve. If the Stuart pretender tried to seize power when a monarch died, there would be no parliament at the moment of extreme political crisis. Parliament therefore enacted statutes to ensure its own existence after a demise. The Security of King and Government Act 1695 provided that Parliament would continue to exist for six months following the death of King William. If no parliament was in existence, the former parliament would be immediately recalled. After William's death and Queen Anne's accession, Parliament enacted similar provisions in the Succession to the Crown Act 1707, to ensure Parliament would continue until the Hanoverian heir arrived after Anne's death. If Parliament was adjourned or prorogued, it was to be recalled immediately upon the monarch's death.

The Demise of the Crown Act 1702 also dealt with the effect of the demise on court actions. It provided that all courts, judicial commissions, and court actions continued notwithstanding the death of King William, and that the same principle would apply to all future demises of the Crown.

=== 19th-century reforms ===
The British Parliament continued to reduce the impact of the demise of the Crown during the 19th century. For instance, as the British Empire expanded, the issue of communications with distant colonies became an issue. Parliament therefore enacted a series of statutes to continue in office colonial governors, military officers, and other public servants, giving them longer periods of time to swear oaths of allegiance to the new monarch than was the case for public officials in Britain. Moreover, as the power of the monarchy was eclipsed by that of Parliament and the Prime Minister became clearly established as the chief executive, the demise of the crown decreased in importance as a political event.

In 1867, Parliament enacted the Representation of the People Act 1867, repealing the provisions in the Succession to the Crown Act 1707 which extended the life of a Parliament for six months after the death of the monarch. Instead, the 1867 Act provided that an existing Parliament continues to the end of its normal term, unaffected by the monarch's death.

The last time the British Parliament legislated for the Empire as a whole in relation to the demise of the Crown was upon the death of Queen Victoria in 1901. It enacted the Demise of the Crown Act 1901, which continued in office all public officials in Britain and the Empire. This Act expressly applies to all future demises. Accordingly, even the Prime Minister no longer needs to be reappointed after a demise of the Crown, as all officeholders immediately continue to serve under the new monarch for an unlimited period of time, without the legal need to retake their oaths of allegiance or of office, their appointments being unaffected by the demise of the Crown.

In Parliament, however, by tradition members of both Houses still retake their oaths of allegiance upon a demise of the Crown. While Parliament is required to meet upon a demise, there is no legal compulsion on members of the House of Commons to retake their oaths in mid-Parliament. The re-taking of the oaths with the explicit mention of the new monarch's name is merely a matter of tradition. The oath taken to the new monarch's predecessor already includes a reference to heirs and successors anyway. In the House of Lords, however, there is an official requirement in the Standing Orders of that House that members must retake their oaths of allegiance in order to continue taking part in the business of the House.

== Abdication of Edward VIII ==
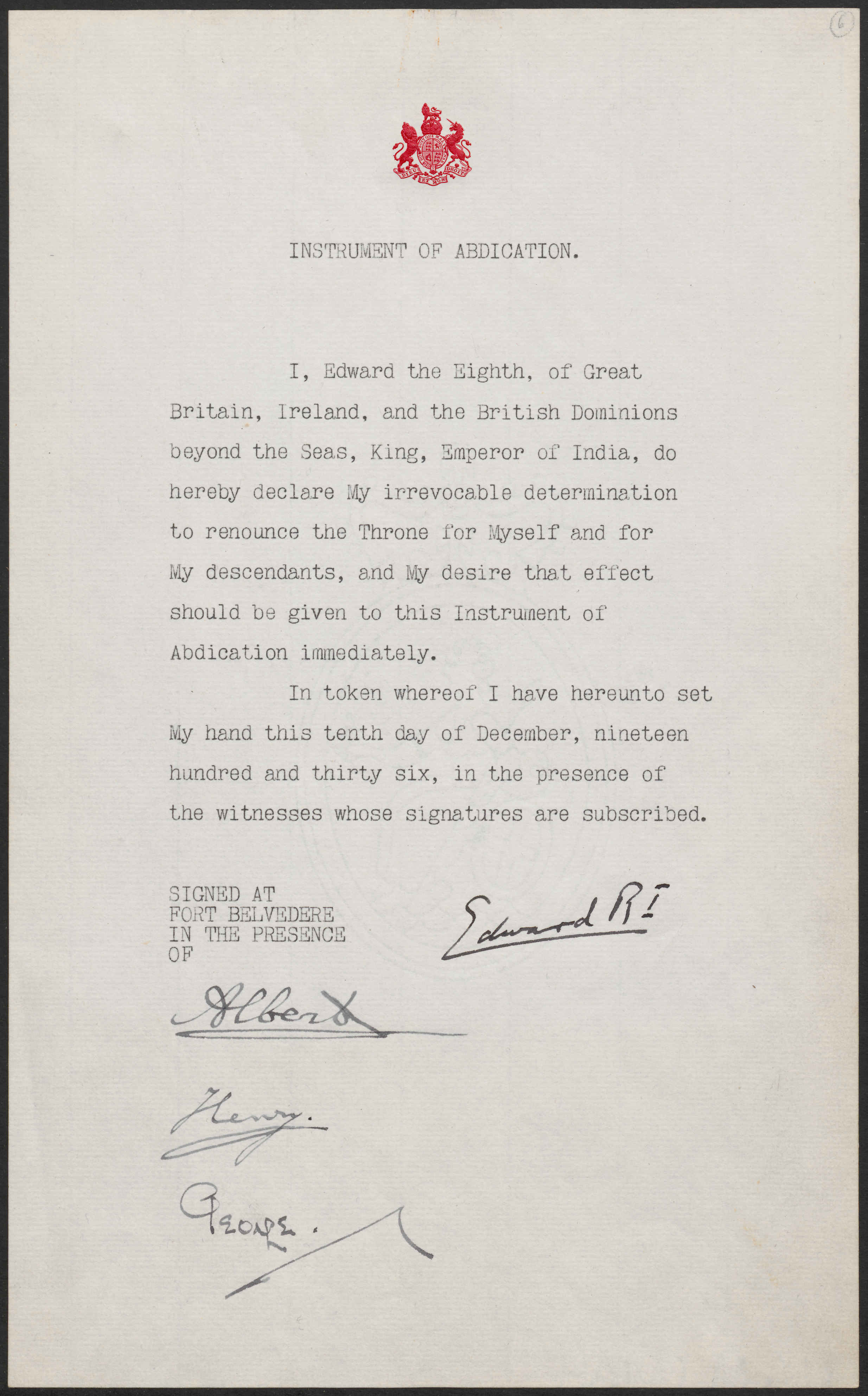
The Instrument of Abdication signed by Edward VIII, which was given legal force by His Majesty's Declaration of Abdication Act

Although the concept of the demise of the Crown evolved in the context of the death of the monarch, it was also used in the case of the Abdication of Edward VIII in 1936. The British Parliament passed a statute, His Majesty's Declaration of Abdication Act 1936, which declared that immediately on Edward granting royal assent, he would cease to be king and "...there shall be a demise of the Crown, and accordingly the member of the Royal Family then next in succession to the Throne shall succeed thereto and to all the rights, privileges, and dignities thereunto belonging.". Edward's brother Albert, next in line, became king under the regnal name of George VI.

== Practice upon the demise ==
=== United Kingdom ===
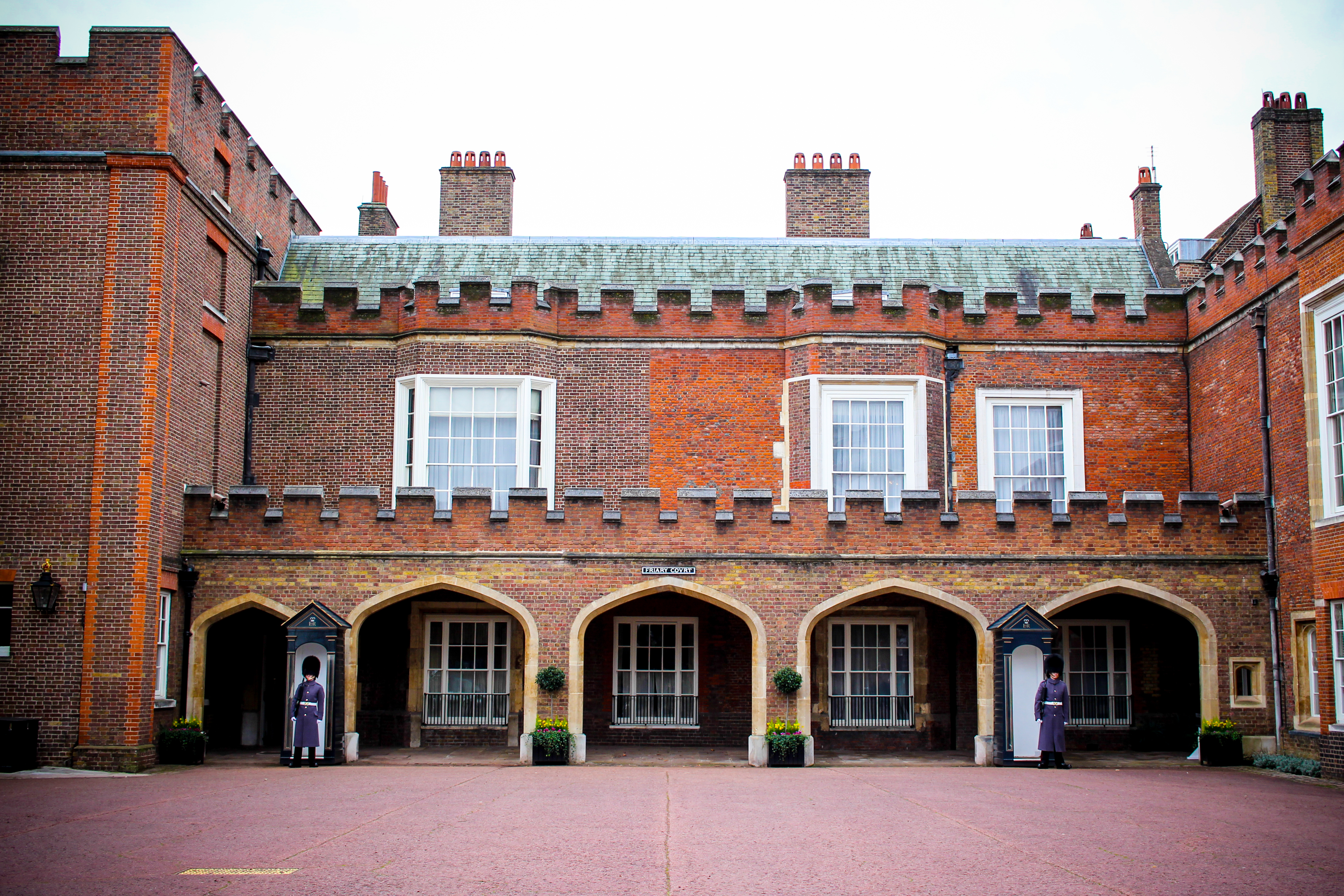
The Proclamation Gallery of St James' Palace in London, where the proclamation of the new British monarch is first read

Upon the Crown's demise, in the United Kingdom, a meeting of the Accession Council is held at St James's Palace in London in order to give directions for the proclamation of the new monarch. All members of the Privy Council, the Lord Mayor of London and the Court of Aldermen, and the High Commissioners of the Commonwealth realms are invited to the Council. This meeting is to arrange for the formal proclamation of the new monarch. Neither the identity nor the accession to the throne of the next monarch depends on the Council, as the new monarch has already automatically succeeded by the demise of the Crown. The proclamation takes place in London at St James's Palace, Charing Cross, within the City Boundary at Temple Bar, and the Royal Exchange. The new monarch is also proclaimed at Edinburgh, Belfast and Cardiff.

The Succession to the Crown Act 1707 provides that if Parliament is adjourned or prorogued upon a demise of the Crown, it must meet as soon as possible. If sitting, Parliament must immediately proceed to act without any summons in the usual form. At the first meeting of Parliament under a new monarch there is no speech from the throne. All members of Parliament and members of the House of Lords gather in peace and swear or affirm an allegiance to the new sovereign. The House votes an Address to the Crown in response to the official notification of the previous monarch's demise, expressing condolences upon the death of the previous monarch and pledging loyalty to his or her successor.

Under the Representation of the People Act 1985, if the demise of the Crown occurs during a general election, the vote is postponed by fourteen days.

=== Canada ===
==== Colonial period ====
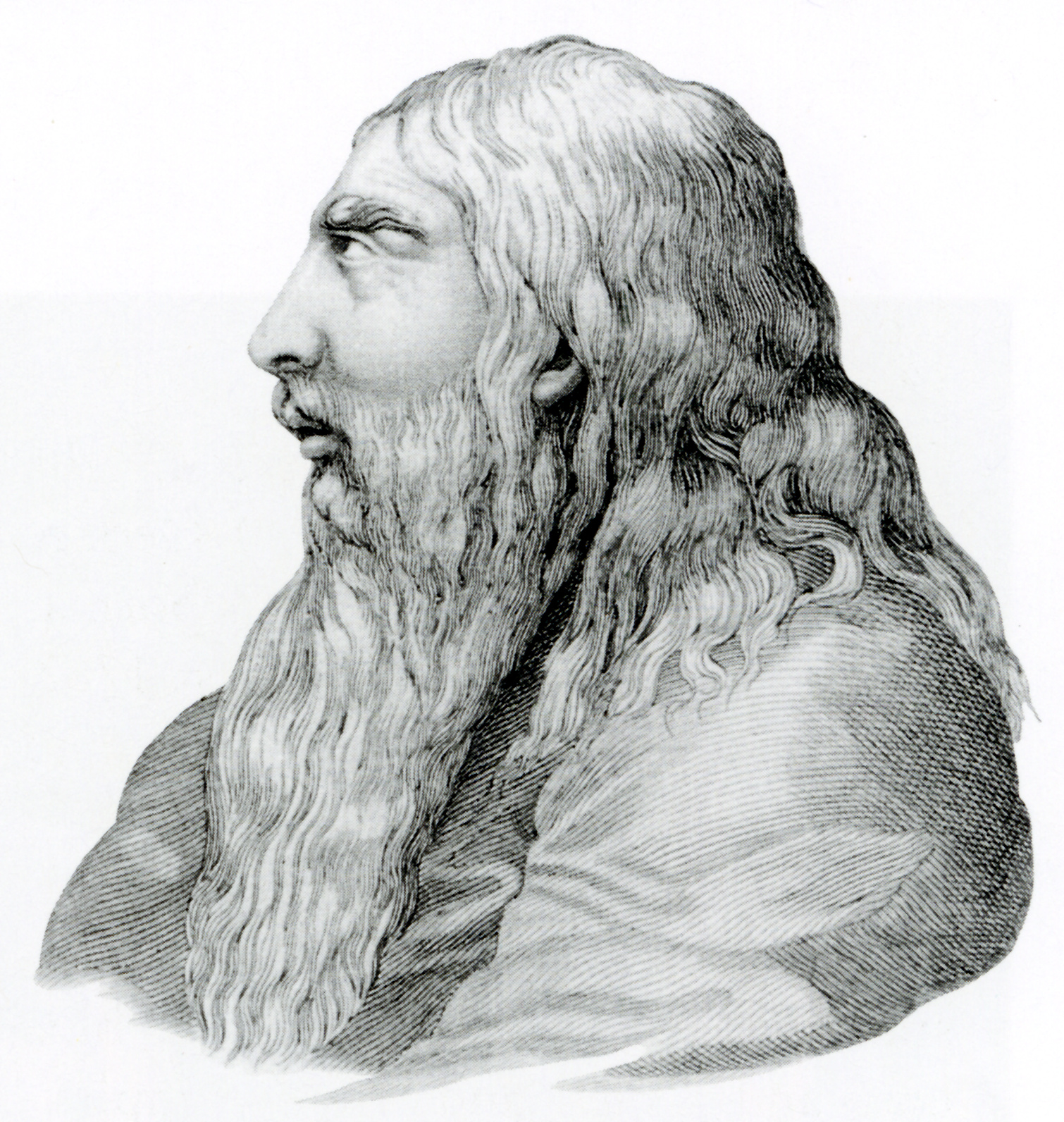
George III in 1817

The legal effects of the demise of the Crown became part of the constitutional law of the British North American colonies, through the doctrine of the reception of English law. Since most of the eastern colonies were established during the long reign of George III from 1760, the effect of the demise of the Crown was not felt until his death in 1820. In Lower Canada, one of the shortest parliaments in Canadian history was cut short by the demise of the Crown: the 10th Parliament of Lower Canada sat for only 13 days, from its opening on April 11, 1820, to its dissolution on April 24, when the news arrived of George III's death.

The practice of dissolving the parliament upon the demise of the Crown was ended in the Parliament of the Province of Canada in 1843, and later re-affirmed with the Parliament of Canada through new legislation in 1867.

==== Post-1867 ====
In Canada the Privy Council for Canada meets in Ottawa to perform the same functions as in other realms.

In Canada, upon the demise of the Crown, the Prime Minister is responsible for convening the Parliament, tabling a resolution of loyalty and condolence from the Parliament to the next monarch of Canada, and arranging for the motion to be seconded by the leader of the Official Opposition. The Prime Minister will then move to adjourn Parliament.

=== Other Commonwealth realms ===
Upon the accession of the new monarch, similar formalities are followed in the Commonwealth realms, as the monarch holds their position separately in each realm.

Similar meetings are held by Australia's Federal Executive Council in Canberra, the Executive Councils of the various Australian States, the Executive Council of New Zealand in Wellington and equivalent bodies in the other Commonwealth realms.

Viceregal appointments remain unaffected by the demise of the Crown. Governors-General, Governors, and Lieutenant-Governors automatically remain in office, therefore, serving under both the preceding and succeeding monarchs.

== Coronation ==
The coronation of the new monarch usually occurs within eighteen months, but is not necessary to secure the succession. The succession of the new monarch occurs automatically upon the demise of the Crown.

The coronation is purely the ceremonial end of the accession process.

== See also ==
- The king is dead, long live the king!
- Operation London Bridge
