= Custos Rotulorum Act 1545 =

Act of the Parliament of England

Custos Rotulorum Act 1545 (Note: The citation of this act by this short title was authorised by section 5 of, and the second schedule to, the Statute Law Revision Act 1948. Due to the repeal of those provisions, it is now authorised by section 19(2) of the Interpretation Act 1978.)
- Act of Parliament
- Parliament of England
- Long title: An Acte for the Offyces of the Custos Rotulorum. (Note: These words are printed against this act in the second column of the second schedule to the Statute Law Revision Act 1948, which is headed "Title".)
- Citation: 37 Hen. 8. c. 1
- Territorial extent: England and Wales

Dates
- Royal assent: 24 December 1545
- Commencement: 23 November 1545 (Note: Start of session.)
- Repealed: 1 February 1969 (Note: The Justices of the Peace Act 1968 (Commencement No. 1) Order 1968 (SI 1968/2035).)
Other legislation
Repealed by	Statute Law Revision Act 1887; Statute Law Revision Act 1948; Justices of the Peace Act 1968

Status: Repealed

Text of statute as originally enacted

The Custos Rotulorum Act 1545 (37 Hen. 8. c. 1) was an act of the Parliament of England.

== Subsequent developments ==
Section 2, 3 and 4 of the act from "that the Archebisshoppe" to "successors and" was repealed by section 1 of, and the schedule to, the Statute Law Revision Act 1887 (50 & 51 Vict. c. 59), which came into force on 16 September 1887.

Section 4 of the act was repealed by section 1 of, and the first schedule to, the Statute Law Revision Act 1948 (11 & 12 Geo. 6. c. 62), which came into force on 30 July 1948.

The whole act, so far as unrepealed, was repealed by section 8(2) of, and part II of schedule 5 to, the Justices of the Peace Act 1968, which came into force on 1 February 1969.
