= Jurisdiction in Liberties Act 1535 =

Act of the Parliament of England

Jurisdiction in Liberties Act 1535 (Note: The citation of this act by this short title was authorised by section 5 of, and the second schedule to, the Statute Law Revision Act 1948. Due to the repeal of those provisions, it is now authorised by section 19(2) of the Interpretation Act 1978.)
- Act of Parliament
- Parliament of England
- Long title: An Acte for recontynuyng of certayne liberties and francheses heretofore taken frome the Crowne. (Note: These words are printed against this act in the second column of the second schedule to the Statute Law Revision Act 1948, which is headed "Title".)
- Citation: 27 Hen. 8. c. 24
- Territorial extent: England and Wales

Dates
- Royal assent: 14 April 1536
- Commencement: 1 July 1536 (Note: Section 1.)
- Repealed: 1 February 1969 (Note: The Justices of the Peace Act 1968 (Commencement No. 1) Order 1968.)

Other legislation
- Repealed by: Statute Law Revision Act 1863; Sheriffs Act 1887; Statute Law Revision Act 1888; Supreme Court of Judicature (Consolidation) Act 1925; Administration of Justice (Miscellaneous Provisions) Act 1938; Statute Law Revision Act 1948; Justices of the Peace Act 1968; Courts Act 1971
- Relates to: Laws in Wales Act 1535; Act of Absentees

Status: Repealed

Text of statute as originally enacted

The Jurisdiction in Liberties Act 1535 (27 Hen. 8. c. 24) was an act of the Parliament of England curtailing the independent jurisdiction of liberties and counties palatine, bringing them more in line with the royal government of the shires. It was promoted by Thomas Cromwell. The geographical area of many of the liberties corresponded to monasteries which were to be dissolved. Opposition to the act was a factor in the Pilgrimage of Grace revolt in Yorkshire in 1536.

The Laws in Wales Act 1535 (27 Hen. 8. c. 26) similarly abolished the Marcher Lordships of Wales. In the Lordship of Ireland, the Absentees Act 1537 (28 Hen. 8. c. 3 (I)) had similarities, extinguishing the palatine privileges of English absentee lords whose undergoverned lands had provided succour to Silken Thomas' 1534 rebellion.

== Provisions ==
Sections of the act
§ SoR (Note: Section numbering in revised editions of the Statutes of the Realm.)	§ Ruff (Note: Section numbering in Owen Ruffhead's edition of the Statutes.)	Provision	Repealed by (Note: The whole act was repealed by the Justices of the Peace Act 1968, except the repeal of section 3 did not affect the form to be taken by the process of any court. The preamble was repealed by the Criminal Law Act 1967 and the words of commencement by the Statute Law Revision Act 1948.)
1	1	No person shall pardon for treason and felony except the king.	Criminal Law Act 1967
2	2	No person shall make justices except the king.	Justices of the Peace Act 1949 (12, 13 & 14 Geo. 6. c. 101)
3	3	Judicial writs and indictments shall be in the name of the king.	Courts Act 1971
3 (ctd)	4	Only the king's peace, not anyone else's	Courts Act 1971
4	5	Exception for Lancashire, whose county court can continue to use a distinct judicial seal.	Justices of the Peace Act 1949 (12, 13 & 14 Geo. 6. c. 101)
5	6	Exception for ancient boroughs with their own justices	Justices of the Peace Act 1949 (12, 13 & 14 Geo. 6. c. 101)
6	7	The bailiffs and other officers of a shire can operate within any liberty which is within the shire	Sheriffs Act 1887 (50 & 51 Vict. c. 55)
7	8	Exception for ancient boroughs with their own bailiffs or officers	Sheriffs Act 1887 (50 & 51 Vict. c. 55)
8	9	Fines levied by bailiffs or officers are due to the king	Sheriffs Act 1887 (50 & 51 Vict. c. 55)
9	10	Purveyance allowed within liberties...	Statute Law Revision Act 1863 (26 & 27 Vict. c. 125)
9 (ctd)	11	...using the same form as elsewhere	Statute Law Revision Act 1863 (26 & 27 Vict. c. 125)
10	12	When the king is in a liberty, only his Verge (Marshalsea Court) and his Clerk of the Market shall act...	Statute Law Revision Act 1948 (11 & 12 Geo. 6. c. 62) (part related to Clerk of the Market)
11	13	...exception for the City of London's court and clerk	
12	14	Existing statutes applying to sheriffs and bailiffs shall apply to officers of liberties	Sheriffs Act 1887 (50 & 51 Vict. c. 55)
13	15	...except that liberty officers can remain in office for more than one year	Sheriffs Act 1887 (50 & 51 Vict. c. 55)
14	16	Sessions of the justice of the peace and gaol delivery shall take the same form within liberties as elsewhere...	Justices of the Peace Act 1949 (12, 13 & 14 Geo. 6. c. 101) (so far as it related to justices of the peace)
15	17	...except that they must take place within the liberty	Justices of the Peace Act 1949 (12, 13 & 14 Geo. 6. c. 101) (so far as it related to justices of the peace)
16	18	Saving for Sir Thomas Englefield, justice of Cheshire and Flintshire	Statute Law Revision Act 1948 (11 & 12 Geo. 6. c. 62)
17	19	Exception for ancient boroughs with their own courts	
18	20	Exception that the Bishop of Ely shall be justice of the peace for the Isle of Ely	Statute Law Revision Act 1948 (11 & 12 Geo. 6. c. 62)
19	21	Exception that the Bishop of Durham and his temporal chancellor shall be justices of the peace for County Durham	Statute Law Revision Act 1948 (11 & 12 Geo. 6. c. 62) (for bishop) and Justices of the Peace Act 1968 (for temporal chancellor)
20	22	Exception that the Archbishop of York and his temporal chancellor shall be justices of the peace for Hexhamshire	Statute Law Revision Act 1948 (11 & 12 Geo. 6. c. 62)

== Subsequent developments ==
The whole act, so far as unrepealed, but so that the repeal of section 3 shall not affect the form to be taken by the process of any court, was repealed by section 8(2) of, and part I of schedule 5 to, the Justices of the Peace Act 1968, which came into force on 25 October 1968.
