= Justices of the Peace Act 1547 =

Act of the Parliament of England

Justices of the Peace Act 1547 (Note: The citation of this act by this short title was authorised by section 5 of, and the second schedule to, the Statute Law Revision Act 1948. Due to the repeal of those provisions, it is now authorised by section 19(2) of the Interpretation Act 1978.)
- Act of Parliament
- Parliament of England
- Long title: An Acte for the contynuance of Actions after the deathe of anny King of this Realme. (Note: These words are printed against this act in the second column of the second schedule to the Statute Law Revision Act 1948, which is headed "Title".)
- Citation: 1 Edw. 6. c. 7
- Territorial extent: England and Wales; Ireland

Dates
- Royal assent: 24 December 1547
- Commencement: 4 November 1547 (Note: Start of session.)
- Repealed: 1 February 1969 (Note: The Justices of the Peace Act 1968 (Commencement No. 1) Order 1968.)

Other legislation
- Amended by: Statute Law Revision Act 1863; Civil Procedure Acts Repeal Act 1879; Supreme Court of Judicature (Consolidation) Act 1925; Criminal Law Act 1967
- Repealed by: Justices of the Peace Act 1968
- Relates to: Demise of the Crown Act 1702

Status: Repealed

Text of statute as originally enacted

The Justices of the Peace Act 1547 (1 Edw. 6. c. 7) was an act of the Parliament of England.

== Subsequent developments ==
Section 2 of the act was repealed by section 1 of, and the schedule to, the Statute Law Revision Act 1863 (26 & 27 Vict. c. 125), which came into force on 28 July 1863.

Sections 1 and 3 of the act were repealed by section 2 of, and part I of the schedule to, the Civil Procedure Acts Repeal Act 1879 (42 & 43 Vict. c. 59), which came into force on 15 August 1879.

Section 5, to the words " continued in full force and strength ", was repealed by section 10(2) of, and part I of schedule 3 to, the Criminal Law Act 1967, which came into force on 1 January 1968.

The whole act, so far as unrepealed, was repealed by section 8(2) of, and part II of schedule 5 to, the Justices of the Peace Act 1968, which came into force on 1 February 1969.

The act was retained for the Republic of Ireland by sections 2(1) and 3(1) of, and part 2 of schedule 2 to, the Statute Law Revision Act 2007, which came into force on 8 May 2007.

== See also ==
- Justices of the Peace Act
