= Great Seal Act 1688 =

Act of the Parliament of England

Great Seal Act 1688 (Note: The citation of this act by this short title was authorised by section 5 of, and the second schedule to, the Statute Law Revision Act 1948. Due to the repeal of those provisions, it is now authorised by section 19(2) of the Interpretation Act 1978.)
- Act of Parliament
- Parliament of England
- Long title: An Act for enabling the Lords Commissioners for the Great Seale to Execute the office of Lord Chancellor or Lord Keeper. (Note: These words are printed against this act in the second column of the second schedule to the Statute Law Revision Act 1948, which is headed "Title".)
- Citation: 1 Will. & Mar. c. 21 (Note: This is the citation in The Statutes of the Realm.); 1 Will. & Mar. Sess. 1. c. 21 (Note: This is the citation in The Statutes at Large.)
- Territorial extent: England and Wales

Dates
- Royal assent: 22 June 1689
- Commencement: 13 February 1689 (Note: Start of session.)
Other legislation
Amended by	Lancaster County Clerk Act 1871; Short Titles Act 1896; Local Government (Clerks) Act 1931; Statute Law Revision Act 1948; Justices of the Peace Act 1968

Status: Partially repealed

Text of statute as originally enacted

Revised text of statute as amended

Text of the Great Seal Act 1688 as in force today (including any amendments) within the United Kingdom, from legislation.gov.uk.

The Great Seal Act 1688 (1 Will. & Mar. c. 21) is an act of the Parliament of England.

As of 2025, section 1 of the act is still in force in England and Wales. The rest of the act has been repealed.

The act was passed because the office of Lord Chancellor had been put in commission (that is, divided between several officers at the same time, instead of being held by a single individual). Section 1 of the Act states that the commissioners are to be called Lords Commissioners of the Great Seal of England, and that each lord commissioner is to have the same powers as the Lord Chancellor has. Each lord commissioner is to rank in the order of precedence after the Speaker of the House of Commons. The office was last in commission in 1850.

As of April 2025 the Lord Chancellor is Shabana Mahmood.

== Repeals ==
Section 9 of the act was repealed by section 4 of the Lancaster County Clerk Act 1871 (34 & 35 Vict. c. 73).

Sections 4 to 6 of the act were repealed by schedule 4 to the Local Government (Clerks) Act 1931 (21 & 22 Geo. 5. c. 45).

Sections 7 and 8 of the act were repealed by section 1 of, and the first schedule to, the Statute Law Revision Act 1948 (11 & 12 Geo. 6. c. 62).

Sections 2 and 3 of the act were repealed by section 8(2) of, and parts I and II of schedule 5 to, the Justices of the Peace Act 1968, which came into force on 25 October 1968 and 1 February 1969, respectively.
