= Justices of the Peace Act 1361 =

Act of the Parliament of England

Justices of the Peace Act 1361 (Note: The citation of this act by this short title was authorised by section 5 of, and the second schedule to, the Statute Law Revision Act 1948. Due to the repeal of those provisions, it is now authorised by section 19(2) of the Interpretation Act 1978.)
- Act of Parliament
- Parliament of England
- Long title: What sort of persons shall be justices of peace; and what authority they shall have.
- Citation: 34 Edw. 3. c. 1
- Territorial extent: England and Wales; Ireland

Dates
- Royal assent: 1361
- Commencement: 1361

Other legislation
- Amended by: Statute Law Revision Act 1948; Magistrates’ Courts (Appeals From Binding Over Orders) Act 1956; Criminal Law Act 1967
- Relates to: Magistrates' Courts Act 1980; Judicature (Northern Ireland) Act 1978; Magistrates’ Court (Northern Ireland) Order 1981

Status: Amended

Text of statute as originally enacted

Revised text of statute as amended

Text of the Justices of the Peace Act 1361 as in force today (including any amendments) within the United Kingdom, from legislation.gov.uk.

The Justices of the Peace Act 1361 (34 Edw. 3. c. 1) is an act of the Parliament of England. The act, although amended, remains enforceable in England and Wales as of 2025.

== Background ==
Maintaining the peace had long been a concern of society and part of the common law, but that aspect of the common law was enshrined into statute by the enactment of the Justices of the Peace Act 1361. The primary reason for the legislation was due to concerns about soldiers returning from the war in France, and the potential of them not reintegrating back into their communities as peaceful citizens.

The act defined who was eligible to become a justice of the peace, their duties and their powers. It detailed that each county assigned a lord and three or four worthy people to become justices of the peace. The role of a justice of the peace was to deal with 'offenders, rioters, and all other barators'. It empowered them to apprehend, arrest, and punish them, in accordance with the 'law and customs of the realm'.

The act empowered a justice of the peace to imprison offenders, bind them over with sureties to be of good behaviour towards the Crown and people of the realm, and set fines, specifying the fine should be 'reasonable and just' according to the circumstances of the offence.

== Ireland – the Land War ==
The act applied to Ireland, but was not of much importance until the so-called Land War of 1879–1882, a highly organised campaign for tenants' rights. Lay magistrates, anxious to find a legal device to suppress the mass meetings which were a key part of the campaign, sought legal advice from the central government. The Crown's legal advice was that they should invoke the power in the act to bind offenders over to keep the peace. The advice was controversial due to the reference in the act to "rioters": it was argued that since the meetings were largely peaceful they could not possibly come within the definition of riot. Due to these concerns, widespread use of the act soon ceased.

== The role of justice of the peace ==
The role of justice of the peace, now often known as magistrates, originates from the act. The powers and responsibilities of them have altered over their long history. A justice of the peace held powerful sentencing powers such as hanging, whipping and penal transportation. Justices of the peace gained an array of duties such as dealing with local infrastructures such as roads and bridges, and regulating weights and measures used by traders. Many of the duties of justice of the peace, due to the development of local administration, were transferred to local government authorities.

As of 2018, about 21,500 volunteers service as a justice of the peace in magistrates' courts. Typically, they deal with low-level offences and crimes, and deal with 95% of criminal cases taken to court. The maximum sentence a magistrates' court can impose is six months imprisonment for a single offence, or 12 months imprisonment for multiple offences, and an unlimited fine. A magistrates' court is the starting point for the majority of the most serious types of crime that are later committed to the Crown Court. An appeal court against a decision made in a magistrates' court is the appeal is heard by two Justice of the Peace sitting with a Judge.

In addition to criminal cases, magistrates also hear youth court cases, involving people under 18 years old, civil cases, such as non-payment of Council Tax, and sit in family proceedings courts.

== Breach of the peace ==
The act permitted a justice of the peace to bind over people who disturbed the peace to provide recognisance to ensure their future good conduct.

A breach of the peace can occur at any place, including private houses. The modern definition of a breach of the peace is:

There is a Breach of the Peace when,

1. harm is actually done, or is likely to be done, to a person, whether by the conduct of the person against whom a breach of the peace is alleged or by someone whom it provokes;, or
2. harm is actually done, or is likely done, to a person's property in his presence
3. a person is genuinely in fear of harm to himself or to his property in his presence as a result of an assault, affray, riot or other disturbance"

Any person can make an arrest or a preventative measure when,

- "a breach of the peace occurs in his presence, or
- he reasonably believes that such a breach is about to occur, whether or not there has yet been a breach'

Binding over orders originate from the act. A person can be taken to court to be bound over, formally known as being bound over to keep the peace, after 2013, the specifics of what a person cannot do is tighter and clearly defined on the bind-over order. A breach of the peace is a civil law case, although it uses the criminal standard of proof 'beyond reasonable doubt'. After 7 October 2013, the Criminal Practice Direction [2013] EWCA Crim 1631 contain the full court procedures for binding over orders for any matter, including breach of the peace.

A person must agree to be bound over. In a magistrates' court, a person refusing to be bound over is dealt with under the Magistrates' Courts Act 1980, and liable to imprisonment up to a maximum of six months or until they comply with the order. In the Crown Court, such a refusal is dealt with as contempt of court.

== Subsequent developments ==
The words from " et auxint doier et terminer " onwards were repealed for England and Wales by section 10(2) of, and part II of schedule 3 to, the Criminal Law Act 1967, which came into force on 1 January 1968.

== See also ==
- Binding over
- Breach of the peace
- Halsbury's Statutes
- Magistrate (England and Wales)
- Justices of the Peace Act
