= Citizen's arrest in Hong Kong =

Citizen's arrest in Hong Kong is legally permitted under Section 101 of the Criminal Procedure Ordinance (Cap. 221 of the Laws of Hong Kong providing the circumstances where a citizen has the power to make arrest without a warrant. Such arrest must be based on reasonable suspicion of an arrestable offense. Section 101 of the Ordinance permits reasonable force during citizen arrests. Successful execution of citizen's arrest may see the member of public being lauded by the Hong Kong Police Force with its Good Citizen Award. However, there are cases in which during the execution of citizen's arrest, it resulted in the death of the suspected perpetrators, or public debates on what's considered citizen's arrest and unlawful detention.

== Legal provisions ==
USection 101 of the Criminal Procedure Ordinance (the CPO) (Cap. 221 of the Laws of Hong Kong) sets out the circumstances where a citizen has the power to make an arrest. The law granted members of the public to arrest any person whom they may reasonably suspect of an arrestable offence without a warrant. In other words, when any member of the public is executing such power, not only should they consider whether the suspected offender has committed a criminal offence, but also they should ensure the offence that was violated is an “arrestable offence”, which means an offence for which the sentence is fixed by law or for which a person may under any law be sentenced to imprisonment for a term exceeding 12 months (ie. including murder, wounding, assault, arson and theft etc.). It also includes any attempt to commit any such offence. According to Section 3 of the Interpretation and General Clauses Ordinance (Cap. 1 of the Laws of Hong Kong), an "arrestable offence" means an offence for which the sentence is fixed by law or for which a person may under any law be sentenced to imprisonment for a term exceeding 12 months, and including any attempt to commit any such offence.

Section 101A of the CPO stipulates that "(a) person may use such force as is reasonable in the circumstances in the prevention of crime or in effecting or assisting in the lawful arrest of offenders or suspected offenders or of persons unlawfully at large". Should citizens witness any person committing an offence, they should report to the Police at once. If citizens find it necessary to stop any criminal act or to subdue any suspected offender, they may only use such force as is reasonable and proportionate in the circumstances to control the suspect. Such power does not include the power to search. Whether the offence in respect of which an arrest is made by a citizen constitutes an "arrestable offence" and whether the force used was reasonable can only be determined after the Police have made a comprehensive investigation. Generally speaking, such power did not include any deliberate violence to harm the suspect, for example, vigilantism.

== Good Citizen Award ==
The Good Citizen Award (GCA) was launched in 1973. The objectives of the scheme are to encourage members of the public to report the crime to the Police, to be prepared to act as witnesses and to help others when appropriate.

The GCA is given out twice a year. Each awardee will receive $3,000 and a certificate.

As a general rule, to qualify for a GCA the following criteria must be met: the nominee must have acted with bravery and courage to assist the Police or other member(s) of the public; in preventing or detecting a crime or in apprehending the culprit(s) in the case(s) where there is an intent or an attempt to commit a crime; or in protecting of life; and the degree of assistance rendered must have been material and of substantial value.

In Oct 2017, 13-year-old student Khan M Hanif spotted a male who was fleeing after snatching a wrist bag from a passerby. Khan followed the male for 3 minutes and subdued the male with assistance from two other passers-by. The male was eventually convicted of “Theft”. Khan thus received the Good Citizen Award for his action.

== Notable cases ==
=== Tai Wai garage attack ===
In November 2018, a 42-year-old man, Ho Sin-hang, allegedly broke into a garage on Shing Hing Street, Tai Wai and damaged a vehicle thereat with two other masked accomplices. Three garage workers witnessed the incident; they chased and subdued Ho. During the course, Ho reportedly cried out “I can not breathe” before he lost his consciousness, and lately certified dead upon hospitalised. The three garage workers were, as a result, arrested for “manslaughter”. Though the autopsy report showed that the deceased had consumed dangerous drugs before, putting his actual cause of death into unknown and causing the prosecutions to drop their charges, the three garage workers had already lost their freedom from being remanded in jail for more than four months.

=== Unlawful detention of reporter Fu Guohao in HK International Airport ===
In August 2019, a Global Times reporter Fu Guohao was surrounded by protesters at the Hong Kong International Airport when he refused to show his press pass after being seen taking close-up photos of demonstrators. They tied Fu’s hands to a trolley with zip ties, kicked and hit Fu with umbrellas repeatedly for hours. Fu was also insulted by shining flashlights in his eyes and pouring water on him and searched by protestors. Protestors also denied Fu from any medical support by paramedics until 12.20am of the following morning when paramedics managed to rescue him.

When Democrats Lawmaker Fernando Cheung was asked to comment on such assault, Cheung said if any person saw Fu doing illegal acts, he could execute his civil arrest power and bring him to Police or the Airport Authority. But he latterly admitted that he could not witness Fu engaging in any illegal activities. This triggers a hot debate on citizen’s arrest and the legal red line of unlawful detention.

Video footage of protestors' attack on Fu showed him shouting, "I support the Hong Kong police: you can beat me now!" (in Chinese) as protestors tied him up. His words became a viral online expression of pro-establishment support among mainland Chinese. A common mainland perspective is that protestors' attack on Fu marked a peak in the violence of the 2019-2020 Hong Kong protests.

=== Theft arrest in Taipo ===
In October 2021, a woman was caught allegedly shoplifting in a supermarket in Taipo Market. Upon being intercepted by the supermarket staff, the woman immediately escaped and was stopped by another passer-by. The party was lately surrounded by angry crowds, criticising the supermarket staff as “unlawful detention.” The clip went viral and triggered a heated debate against the difference between the citizen’s arrest and illegal detention.

== See also ==
- Citizen's arrest
