= Demise of the Crown Act 1901 =

Act of the Parliament of the United Kingdom

Demise of the Crown Act 1901 (Note: Section 2.)
- Act of Parliament
- Parliament of the United Kingdom
- Long title: An Act to amend the Law relating to the Holding of Offices in case of the Demise of the Crown.
- Citation: 1 Edw. 7. c. 5
- Introduced by: Sir Robert Finlay MP (Commons)
- Territorial extent: United Kingdom

Dates
- Royal assent: 2 July 1901
- Commencement: 2 July 1901 (Note: The Acts of Parliament (Commencement) Act 1793.)
- Repealed: Republic of Ireland: 8 May 2007
Other legislation
Amended by	Statute Law (Repeals) Act 1973
Repealed by	Republic of Ireland: Statute Law Revision Act 2007

Status: Amended

Status
- Republic of Ireland: Repealed

Text of statute as originally enacted

Revised text of statute as amended

Text of the Demise of the Crown Act 1901 as in force today (including any amendments) within the United Kingdom, from legislation.gov.uk.

The Demise of the Crown Act 1901 (1 Edw. 7. c. 5) is an act of the Parliament of the United Kingdom.

It provides that the holding of any office under the Crown shall not be affected, nor shall any fresh appointment thereto be rendered necessary, by the demise of the Crown.

Section 1 (2) provided that the act took effect retrospectively "as from the last demise of the Crown"; i.e. the death of Queen Victoria.

== Subsequent developments ==
Section 1(2) of the act was repealed by section 1(1) of, and part I of schedule 1 to, the Statute Law (Repeals) Act 1973, which came into force on 18 July 1973.

In the Republic of Ireland, the act was repealed in its entirety by the Statute Law Revision Act 2007.

== See also ==
- Demise of the Crown
- Demise of the Crown Act 1702
- Demise of the Crown Act 1727
- King's Counsel

== Bibliography ==
- The Law & Working of the Constitution: Documents 1660-1914, ed. W. C. Costin & J. Steven Watson. A&C Black, 1952. Vol. II (1784-1914), p. 136
