= Demise of the Crown Act 1702 =

Act of the Parliament of England

Demise of the Crown Act 1702 (Note: The citation of this act by this short title was authorised by section 5 of, and the second schedule to, the Statute Law Revision Act 1948. Due to the repeal of those provisions, it is now authorised by section 19(2) of the Interpretation Act 1978.)
- Act of Parliament
- Parliament of England
- Long title: An Act for explaining a Clause in an Act made at the Parliament begun and holden at Westminster the two and twentieth of November in the Seventh year of the Reign of our Sovereign Lord King William the Third intituled An Act for the better Security of His Majesties Royal Person and Government (Note: These words are printed against this act in the second column of the second schedule to the Statute Law Revision Act 1948, which is headed "Title".)
- Citation: 1 Ann. c. 2 (Note: This is the citation in The Statutes of the Realm.); 1 Ann. St. 1. c. 8 (Note: This is the citation in The Statutes at Large.)
- Territorial extent: England and Wales

Dates
- Royal assent: 30 March 1702
- Commencement: 8 March 1702 (Note: Start of session.)
Other legislation
Amends	Security of King and Government Act 1695
Amended by	Statute Law Revision Act 1867; Statute Law Revision Act 1871; Statute Law Revision Act 1888; Supreme Court of Judicature (Consolidation) Act 1925
Relates to	Justices of the Peace Act 1547; Demise of the Crown Act 1727; Demise of the Crown Act 1901

Status: Amended

Text of statute as originally enacted

Revised text of statute as amended

Text of the Demise of the Crown Act 1702 as in force today (including any amendments) within the United Kingdom, from legislation.gov.uk.

The Demise of the Crown Act 1702 (1 Ann. c. 2) is an act of the Parliament of England. It abolished the rule that all legal proceedings automatically ended upon the death of the monarch.

As of 2025, two sections of the act remain in force in England and Wales: section IV, which preserves actions for debt and contract, and proceedings on indictment, for future demises, and section VI, which extended the act to Ireland.

== Common law position ==
Under medieval English common law, the authority of the royal courts was derived from the monarch personally. As a result, on the death of the monarch, writs and proceedings in the royal courts ceased. Litigants had to begin their proceedings anew, causing delays and additional expenses, such as the cost of reissuing court writs.

This concept was termed the "demise of the Crown". "Demise" was not referring to the death of the previous monarch, but rather was used in the property law sense, of a transfer of property. Upon the death of the previous monarch, the Crown and all its powers and prerogatives were transferred to the succeeding monarch.

Blackstone explains this point:

The king never dies. Henry, Edward, or George may die; but the king survives them all. For immediately upon the decease of the reigning prince in his natural capacity, his kingship or imperial dignity, by act of law, without any interregnum or interval, is vested at once in his heir, … his natural dissolution is generally called his demise; dimissio regis, vel coronae: an expression which signifies merely a transfer of property…

== Tudor reform ==
The effect of the demise of the Crown caused considerable inconvenience for litigants. In 1547, the first year of the reign of King Edward VI, the English Parliament passed the first statute to relieve some of the inconveniences: An Acte for the contynuance of Actions after the deathe of anny King of this Realme. This statute provided that pending court actions would not be affected by the death of King Edward or his successors. Actions could continue under the name of a successor monarch.

== The act ==
The Tudor legislation mainly continued actions begun by writs issued under the name of King Henry VIII. Upon the death of King William III, Parliament enacted the Demise of the Crown Act 1702, which was more comprehensive. It continued the commissions of the various courts and justices issued during William's reign, which were to continue to operate as if the commissions had been issued in the name of Queen Anne. Future commissions were to last for six months after the death of a monarch, unless cancelled sooner by the new monarch. The courts were to continue to operate under Queen Anne or any successor, without interruption. Claims brought by the Crown prior to Williams death to recover property or in debt were continued, as were proceedings on indictments. The same principle applied to property and debt claims, and proceedings on indictments, brought during the reign of Anne or a successor. The demise did not affect any jurisdictional issues in the courts.

== Subsequent developments ==
Section 5 of the act, so far as unrepealed, was repealed by section 8(2) of, and part I of schedule 5 to, the Justices of the Peace Act 1968, which came into force on 25 October 1968.

== See also ==
- Demise of the Crown
- Demise of the Crown Act 1727
- Demise of the Crown Act 1901
- Halsbury's Statutes
