= Justices of the Peace Act 1968 =

Act of the Parliament of the United Kingdom

Justices of the Peace Act 1968 (Note: Section 8(1).)
- Act of Parliament
- Parliament of the United Kingdom
- Long title: An Act to make further provision for confining the office of justice of the peace to persons selected for it, and terminating the appointment of stipendiary magistrates under local Acts, and for matters arising thereout, and to forward in other respects the proper discharge of the functions of justices by amending the law as to age limits, payment of allowances, powers and qualifications of justices' clerks and their assistants and other matters; and for purposes connected therewith.
- Citation: 1968 c. 69
- Territorial extent: England and Wales; Scotland (in part); Northern Ireland (in part); (Note: Section 8(3). Section 4 of the act, other than subsection (5), also extends to Scotland by virtue of section 6(1), and the repeals made by part I of schedule 5 extend to Northern Ireland to the extent that the enactments repealed themselves extended there.)

Dates
- Royal assent: 25 October 1968
- Commencement: various (Note: Section 7(1).)

Other legislation
- Amends: Justices of the Peace Act 1949; See § Repealed enactments
- Repeals/revokes: See § Repealed enactments
- Amended by: Courts Act 1971; Superannuation Act 1972; Administration of Justice Act 1973; Powers of Criminal Courts Act 1973; District Courts (Scotland) Act 1975; Justices of the Peace Act 1979; Magistrates' Courts Act 1980; Statute Law (Repeals) Act 1989

Status: Partially repealed

Text of statute as originally enacted

Revised text of statute as amended

Text of the Justices of the Peace Act 1968 as in force today (including any amendments) within the United Kingdom, from legislation.gov.uk.

The Justices of the Peace Act 1968 (c. 69) is an act of the Parliament of the United Kingdom that reformed the appointment of justices of the peace in England and Wales, abolished the appointment of stipendiary magistrates under local Acts, and repealed a number of enactments relating to justices and magistrates.

== Provisions ==
=== Repealed enactments ===
Section 8(2) of the act repealed 74 enactments, listed in parts I and II of schedule 5 to the act.

==== Part I: Repeals of Unnecessary Enactments ====
Part I — Repeals of Unnecessary Enactments
Citation	Short title	Extent of repeal
27 Hen. 8. c. 24	Jurisdiction in Liberties Act 1535	The whole act, so far as not otherwise repealed, but so that the repeal of section 3 shall not affect the form to be taken by the process of any court.
16 Cha. 1. c. 10	Habeas Corpus Act 1640	The whole act, so far as not otherwise repealed.
1 Will. & Mary c. 21	Great Seal Act 1688	Section 2.
1 Ann. c. 2	Demise of the Crown Act 1702	Section 5, so far as unrepealed.
17 Geo. 2. c. 40	Universities (Wine Licences) Act 1743	The whole act, so far as unrepealed, except, in section 11, the words—"Within the university of Cambridge and the precincts thereof no person shall sell wine by retail unless such person shall be duly licensed so to do by the university".
10 Geo. 4. c. 44	Metropolitan Police Act 1829	In section 1 the words "and of all liberties therein" in both places, the words "and the liberties therein" and the words "and for all liberties therein".
2 & 3 Vict. c. 47	Metropolitan Police Act 1839	In section 4 the words "although they may not be qualified by estate".
19 & 20 Vict. c. 2	Metropolitan Police Act 1856	In section 2 the words "and of all liberties therein", and the words from "and for all liberties" to "for counties".
32 & 33 Vict. c. 47	High Constables Act 1869	The whole act so far as unrepealed.
39 & 40 Vict. c. 59	Appellate Jurisdiction Act 1876	In section 25, in the definition of "high judicial office" the words "or of paid Judge of the Judicial Committee of the Privy Council".
51 & 52 Vict. c. 41	Local Government Act 1888	Section 41(1), (2) and (8). Section 42(13). Section 67.
6 Edw. 7. c. 16	Justices of the Peace Act 1906	Section 1. Section 3, but only in relation to England and Wales.
21 & 22 Geo. 5. c. 45	Local Government (Clerks) Act 1931	Section 1 from "but" onwards. Section 3(1) proviso and section 3(4). Section 4(5) from "as respects" onwards, and section 4(7) from the beginning to the word "and".
10 & 11 Geo. 6. c. xxix	Cheshire and Lancashire County Councils (Runcorn-Widnes Bridge etc.) Act 1947	Section 82.
12, 13 & 14 Geo. 6. c. 101	Justices of the Peace Act 1949	Section 4(6), and in relation to England and Wales section 4(7) and (10). Section 25(5).
12, 13 & 14 Geo. 6. c. xliv	Bradford Corporation Act 1949	Section 83.
4 & 5 Eliz. 2. c. 34	Criminal Justice Administration Act 1956	In Schedule 2, paragraph 7.

==== Part II: Consequential Repeals ====
Part II — Consequential Repeals
Citation	Short title	Description	Extent of repeal
11 Hen. 6. c. 6	Continuance of Indictments	N/A	The whole chapter.
27 Hen. 8. c. 24	Jurisdiction in Liberties Act 1535	The Jurisdiction in Liberties Act 1535.	Section 19, so far as unrepealed.
37 Hen. 8. c. 1	Custos Rotulorum Act 1545	The Custos Rotulorum Act 1545.	The whole act, so far as unrepealed.
1 Edw. 6. c. 7	Justices of the Peace Act 1547	The Justices of the Peace Act 1547.	The whole act, so far as unrepealed.
3 Cha. 1. c. 1	Petition of Right	The Petition of Right.	Sections 3 to 5 and in section 8 the words from "And that no" to "detained".
16 Cha. 1. c. 10	Habeas Corpus Act 1640	The Habeas Corpus Act 1640.	Section 6.
1 Will. & Mary c. 21	Great Seal Act 1688	The Great Seal Act 1688.	Section 3.
6 & 7 Will. 4. c. 19	Durham (County Palatine) Act 1836	The Durham (County Palatine) Act 1836.	Section 3.
2 & 3 Vict. c. 15	Staffordshire Potteries Stipendiary Justice Act 1839	The Staffordshire Potteries Stipendiary Justice Act 1839.	The whole act, so far as unrepealed.
2 & 3 Vict. c. xciv	City of London Police Act 1839	The City of London Police Act 1839.	Section 6.
6 & 7 Vict. c. xliv	Merthyr Tydfil Justices of the Peace Act 1843	An Act to provide for the more effectual execution of the office of the justice of the peace within the parish of Merthyr Tydfil and certain adjoining parishes.	The whole act, so far as unrepealed.
11 & 12 Vict. c. 42	Indictable Offences Act 1848	The Indictable Offences Act 1848.	Section 30.
24 & 25 Vict. c. 96	Larceny Act 1861	The Larceny Act 1861.	Section 117.
24 & 25 Vict. c. 97	Malicious Damage Act 1861	The Malicious Damage Act 1861.	Section 73.
24 & 25 Vict. c. 98	Forgery Act 1861	The Forgery Act 1861.	Section 51.
24 & 25 Vict. c. 100	Offences against the Person Act 1861	The Offences against the Person Act 1861.	Section 71.
28 & 29 Vict. c. 124	Admiralty Powers, &c. Act 1865	The Admiralty Powers, &c. Act 1865.	Section 5.
31 & 32 Vict. c. xxxvi	Merthyr Tydfil Stipendiary Magistrate Act 1868	An Act to extend the limits of the Act for appointing a stipendiary justice of the peace for the parish of Merthyr Tydfil and adjoining places; and for other purposes.	The whole act, so far as unrepealed.
34 & 35 Vict. c. xc	Staffordshire Potteries Stipendiary Justice Act 1871	The Staffordshire Potteries Stipendiary Justice Act 1871.	The whole act, so far as unrepealed.
37 & 38 Vict. c. 45	County of Hertford and Liberty of St. Albans Act 1874	The County of Hertford and Liberty of St. Albans Act 1874.	In section 5 the words "and custos rotulorum", and the words "or the office of custos rotulorum".
41 & 42 Vict. c. lv	Manchester Division and Borough of Salford (Stipendiary Justices) Act 1878	The Manchester Division and Borough of Salford (Stipendiary Justices) Act 1878.	The whole act, so far as unrepealed.
45 & 46 Vict. c. 50	Municipal Corporations Act 1882	The Municipal Corporations Act 1882.	Section 157(2) from "and made" onwards. Section 163(4) from "and made" onwards. In section 168(2) the words "the making of a declaration as in the Eighth Schedule". Sections 239, 240 and 249. Schedule 8, so far as unrepealed.
49 & 50 Vict. c. 31	Oxford University (Justices) Act 1886	The Oxford University (Justices) Act 1886.	The whole act.
51 & 52 Vict. c. 41	Local Government Act 1888	The Local Government Act 1888.	Section 78(2) from "but" onwards. In section 100, the definition of "quarter sessions" from "or for" onwards.
52 & 53 Vict. c. 63	Interpretation Act 1889	The Interpretation Act 1889.	In section 13(12) the words from "the Lord Mayor" to "that city, and". In section 13(13) the words from "the Lord Mayor" to "that city, or".
57 & 58 Vict. c. xxvii	Merthyr Tydfil Stipendiary Justice Act 1894	The Merthyr Tydfil Stipendiary Justice Act 1894.	The whole act, so far as unrepealed.
58 & 59 Vict. c. cvii	Staffordshire Potteries Stipendiary Justice Act 1895	The Staffordshire Potteries Stipendiary Justice Act 1895.	The whole act so far as unrepealed.
62 & 63 Vict. c. xc	South Staffordshire Stipendiary Justice Act 1899	The South Staffordshire Stipendiary Justice Act 1899.	The whole act, so far as unrepealed.
6 Edw. 7. c. 16	Justices of the Peace Act 1906	The Justices of the Peace Act 1906.	Section 4 except in relation to the City of London.
7 Edw. 7. c. cxxviii	Merthyr Tydfil Stipendiary Justice Act 1907	The Merthyr Tydfil Stipendiary Justice Act 1907.	The whole act, so far as unrepealed.
3 & 4 Geo. 5. c. 27	Forgery Act 1913	The Forgery Act 1913.	Section 12, so far as unrepealed.
6 & 7 Geo. 5. c. 50	Larceny Act 1916	The Larceny Act 1916.	Section 37(5), so far as unrepealed.
10 & 11 Geo. 5. c. lxxxvi	Pontypridd Stipendiary Magistrate Act 1920	The Pontypridd Stipendiary Magistrate Act 1920.	The whole act, so far as unrepealed.
11 & 12 Geo. 5. c. ciii	Ministry of Health Provisional Order Confirmation (Stoke-on-Trent Extension) Act 1921	The Ministry of Health Provisional Order Confirmation (Stoke-on-Trent Extension) Act 1921.	In the Schedule, Article 16.
16 & 17 Geo. 5. c. cvi	Wolverhampton Corporation Act 1926	The Wolverhampton Corporation Act 1926.	Section 19.
17 & 18 Geo. 5. c. lxxxvi	West Bromwich Corporation Act 1927	The West Bromwich Corporation Act 1927.	Section 18.
20 & 21 Geo. 5. c. cxx	West Bromwich Corporation Act 1930	The West Bromwich Corporation Act 1930.	Section 20.
20 & 21 Geo. 5. c. cxxv	Wednesbury Corporation Act 1930	The Wednesbury Corporation Act 1930.	Section 23.
20 & 21 Geo. 5. c. clxx	Walsall Corporation Act 1930	The Walsall Corporation Act 1930.	Section 14.
22 & 23 Geo. 5. c. xc	Wolverhampton Corporation Act 1932	The Wolverhampton Corporation Act 1932.	Section 15.
23 & 24 Geo. 5. c. 51	Local Government Act 1933	The Local Government Act 1933.	Section 3(5). Section 5(3) from "except" onwards. Section 18(7), (8) and (10). Section 20(3) from "and" onwards. Section 33(5). Section 34(2) from "except" onwards.
26 Geo. 5 & 1 Edw. 8. c. 16	Coinage Offences Act 1936	The Coinage Offences Act 1936.	Section 12(2) and (3).
26 Geo. 5 & 1 Edw. 8. c. cxi	Wolverhampton Corporation Act 1936	The Wolverhampton Corporation Act 1936.	Section 101, so far as unrepealed.
11 & 12 Geo. 6. c. 58	Criminal Justice Act 1948	The Criminal Justice Act 1948.	Section 45(2)(c) and (3).
12, 13 & 14 Geo. 6. c. 101	Justices of the Peace Act 1949	The Justices of the Peace Act 1949.	In section 1(3) the words "Subject to the next following subsection", and section 1(4). Section 2. In section 4, subsection (4)(a) (from the beginning of the year 1969), and subsection (8). In section 8, subsection (3)(a) and in subsection (4) the words "at the time his salary is determined" (from the coming into force of section 4 of this Act). Section 8(5)(a). Section 11, so far as unrepealed. Section 13(3) from "and" onwards. Section 15(10). In section 20(4), in paragraph (a) the words from "clerk to a stipendiary magistrate" to "aforesaid and" and the last "or", and paragraph (b), but not as respects qualification by service before the coming into force of this repeal. Section 21(7). Section 25(6). In section 27(10), in paragraph (c) the words from "to a stipendiary magistrate" to "and a clerk", in paragraph (d) the words "the Corporation of the City of London" and the words from "and" onwards, and paragraph (e). In section 29(8) the words from "act as" to "nor". Section 30. Section 31(1) and (4). Section 33(2), from the passing of this Act (but not as respects a magistrate appointed before that time). Section 36(2) (from the coming into force of section 4 of this Act). In section 44(1), in the definition of "county justice", the words "a justice for the City of London or". Schedule 1. In Schedule 2, paragraph 19. In Schedule 4, in paragraph 1(1) the words "Subject to the next following sub-paragraph", and paragraph 1(2). Schedule 6.
15 & 16 Geo. 6 & 1 Eliz. 2. c. 55	Magistrates' Courts Act 1952	The Magistrates' Courts Act 1952.	In section 118(3) the words from "appointed" to "1949". Section 120(1). Section 121(1)(a) and (3). In section 126(1), in the definition of "county" (as amended) the words "the City of London and".
2 & 3 Eliz. 2. c. xxvii	City of London (Various Powers) Act 1954	The City of London (Various Powers) Act 1954.	Section 19.
4 & 5 Eliz. 2. c. 34	Criminal Justice Administration Act 1956	The Criminal Justice Administration Act 1956.	Section 13(4) from the passing of this Act (but not as respects a magistrate appointed before that time). In Schedule 2, paragraph 6.
5 & 6 Eliz. 2. c. 27	Solicitors Act 1957	The Solicitors Act 1957.	In section 33, subsection (2)(b) except in relation to the City of London and subsection (3).
7 & 8 Eliz. 2. c. 22	County Courts Act 1959	The County Courts Act 1959.	Section 11.
9 & 10 Eliz. 2. c. 43	Public Authorities (Allowances) Act 1961	The Public Authorities (Allowances) Act 1961.	Section 7 (from the coming into force of section 4 of this Act).
10 & 11 Eliz. 2. c. 15	Criminal Justice Administration Act 1962	The Criminal Justice Administration Act 1962.	Section 10(1) from "and" onwards, and in section 10(2) the words "or, as the case may be, the court". Section 11(2).
1963 c. 33	London Government Act 1963	The London Government Act 1963.	In Schedule 4, paragraph 5.
1964 c. 26	Licensing Act 1964	The Licensing Act 1964.	Section 21(3) from "In this" onwards. In section 57(1) the words "Subject to the following provisions of this section", and section 57(3).
1964 c. 42	Administration of Justice Act 1964	The Administration of Justice Act 1964.	Section 5(3) from "and section 11" onwards. In section 13(2) the words "The custos rotulorum for the inner London area" and the words "for that area". In section 27(5) the words "a clerk to a stipendiary magistrate". Section 30(3) and (4). Section 33. In Schedule 3, in paragraph 11 the word "and"; paragraph 12(2); in paragraph 14(1) the words "3(1), 4 and"; paragraph 15; paragraph 19(1); in paragraph 22, in sub-paragraph (3) the words from "or" to "City", sub-paragraph (4) and in sub-paragraph (5) the words "the City of London and"; paragraph 24; and paragraph 28(3).
1965 c. 28	Justices of the Peace Act 1965	The Justices of the Peace Act 1965.	Section 1(2), but not as respects qualification by service before the coming into force of this repeal.
1967 c. 58	Criminal Law Act 1967	The Criminal Law Act 1967.	Section 7(4).
