= Laws of the Forest of Dean and Hundred of Saint Briavels =

The Forest of Dean and the Hundred of Saint Briavels have laws. These include mining laws, and have included laws relating to timber, inclosures, encroachments and poor relief.

== Legislation ==
The following acts apply:

- The Dean and New Forests Act 1808 (48 Geo. 3. c. 72)
- The Dean Forest Act 1819 (59 Geo. 3. c. 86)
- The Dean Forest (Mines) Act 1838 (1 & 2 Vict. c. 43)
- The Dean Forest Act 1861 (24 & 25 Vict. c. 40)
- The Abbot's Wood (Dean Forest) Act 1870 (33 & 34 Vict. c. viii)
- The Dean Forest (Mines) Act 1871 (34 & 35 Vict. c. 85)
- The Dean Forest (Mines) Act 1904 (4 Edw. 7. c. clvi)
- The Dean Forest Act 1906 (6 Edw. 7. c. cxix)

== History ==
The following acts have been repealed:

- The Dean Forest Act 1667 (19 & 20 Cha. 2. c. 8). Repealed by the Wild Creatures and Forest Laws Act 1971, section 1(4) and schedule.
- The act 1 & 2 Will. 4. c. 12, sometimes called the Dean Forest Commission Act 1831. Repealed by the Statute Law Revision Act 1874 (37 & 38 Vict c 35), section 1 and Schedule
- The act 6 & 7 Will. 4. c. 3, sometimes called the Constable of St. Briavels Act 1836. Repealed by the Wild Creatures and Forest Laws Act 1971, section 1(4) and schedule.
- The Dean Forest (Encroachments) Act 1838 (1 & 2 Vict. c. 42). Repealed by the Wild Creatures and Forest Laws Act 1971, section 1(4) and schedule.
- The act 5 & 6 Vict. c. 48, sometimes called the Dean Forest (Poor) Act 1842. Repealed by the Statute Law Revision Act 1953, section 1 and first schedule.
- The Dean Forest Act 1842 (5 & 6 Vict. c. 65)
- The act 5 & 6 Vict. c. 83, sometimes called the St. Briavels (Court of Requests) Act 1842. Repealed by the Statute Law (Repeals) Act 1969, section 1 and schedule, part VII.
- The act 7 & 8 Vict. c. 13, sometimes called the Dean Forest (Encroachments) Act 1844. Repealed by the Wild Creatures and Forest Laws Act 1971, section 1(4) and schedule.
- The Crown Lands Act 1855 (18 & 19 Vict. c. 16). (An Act to authorize the letting Parts of the Royal Forests of Dean and Woolmer, and certain other Parts of the Hereditary Possessions of the Crown). Repealed by the Crown Estate Act 1961, section 9(4) and third schedule, part I.
- The act 29 & 30 Vict. c. 70, sometimes called the Walmore and Bearce Inclosure Act 1866. Repealed by the Wild Creatures and Forest Laws Act 1971, section 1(4) and schedule.

=== Roads ===
The following repealed acts related to roads in the Forest of Dean:

- The act 36 Geo. 3. c. 131, sometimes called the Dean Forest Roads Act 1796 or the Dean Forest Road Act. Repealed by the act 7 & 8 Geo. 4. c. xii (1827), section 1.
- The act 57 Geo. 3. c. lxvi, sometimes called the Forest of Dean Roads Act 1817. Repealed by the act 7 & 8 Geo. 4. c. xii (1827), section 1.
- The act 7 & 8 Geo. 4. c. xii, sometimes called the Forest of Dean Roads Act 1827. Repealed by the act 1 & 2 Vict. c. xxxviii (1838), section 1.
- The act 1 & 2 Will. 4. c. xlii, sometimes called the Forest of Dean Roads Act 1831 or the Dean Forest Roads Act. Repealed by the act 1 & 2 Vict. c. xxxviii (1838), section 1.
- The act 1 & 2 Vict. c. xxxviii, sometimes called the Forest of Dean Roads Act 1838. Repealed by the Dean Forest Turnpike Roads Act 1858, section 1.
- The Dean Forest Turnpike Roads Act 1858 (21 & 22 Vict. c. lxxxvi). Expired by virtue of the Forest of Dean Turnpike Trust Abolition Act 1888, section 1 and schedule. Repealed by the Statute Law (Repeals) Act 2013.
- The East and West Dean (Highways) Act 1883 (46 & 47 Vict. c. lxxxvii). Repealed by the Wild Creatures and Forest Laws Act 1971, section 1(4) and schedule.
- The Forest of Dean Turnpike Trust Abolition Act 1888 (51 & 52 Vict. c. cxciii). Repealed by the Statute Law (Repeals) Act 2013.

== See also ==
- Freeminer
