= Cyril Hart =

Cyril Hart may refer to:

- Cyril Hart (forester), forestry expert
- Cyril Hart (politician), Nigerian politician
- Cyril Roy Hart, historian of Anglo-Saxon England
