= New Forest Act 1697 =

Act of the Parliament of England

New Forest Act 1697 (Note: The citation of this act by this short title was authorised by section 1 of, and the first schedule to, the Short Titles Act 1896. Due to the repeal of those provisions it is now authorised by section 19(2) of the Interpretation Act 1978.)
- Act of Parliament
- Parliament of England
- Long title: An Act for the increase and preservation of timber in the New Forest in the County of Southampton. (Note: These words are printed against this act in the second column of the first schedule to the Short Titles Act 1896, which is headed "Title".)
- Citation: 9 Will. 3 c. 3 (Note: This is the citation in The Statutes of the Realm.); 9 & 10 Will. 3. c. 33 (Note: This is the citation in The Statutes at Large.)
- Territorial extent: England and Wales

Dates
- Royal assent: 5 July 1698
- Commencement: 3 December 1697 (Note: Start of session.)
- Repealed: 1 July 1971
Other legislation
Amended by	New Forest Act 1877
Repealed by	Wild Creatures and Forest Laws Act 1971
Relates to	New Forest Act 1800

Status: Repealed

Text of statute as originally enacted

The New Forest Act 1697 (9 Will. 3. c. 33) was an act of the Parliament of England which provided that "Waste Lands" in the New Forest be enclosed and planted with trees to supply timber for the ships of the Royal Navy.

== Provisions ==
Of the total area of the Forest, estimated at 85454 acres, 1000 acres was to be enclosed "forthwith", a further 1000 acres in 1699, and thereafter 200 acres annually for 20 years. No trees could be felled in the lands without the Navy's approval; timber not claimed by the Navy would be auctioned in nearby towns. After 1716, locals on lands adjoining the enclosures would be permitted to graze animals and gather firewood on the same basis as in Elizabeth I's reign.

== Subsequent developments ==
The whole act was repealed by section 1(4) of, and the schedule to, the Wild Creatures and Forest Laws Act 1971, which came into force on 1 July 1971.

== See also ==
- English land law
- New Forest Act 1800

== Bibliography ==
- John Raithby, ed. (1820). An Act for the Increase and Preservation of Timber in the New Forest in the County of Southampton. [Chapter XXXIII. Rot. Parl. 9 Gul.III.p.6.n.2.]. Statutes of the Realm. Vol. 7: 1695-1701. History of Parliament Trust. pp. 405–408.
- Halsbury's Statutes
