= Speech House =

Building in West Dean, United Kingdom

Coordinates: 51.80655°N 2.55243°W

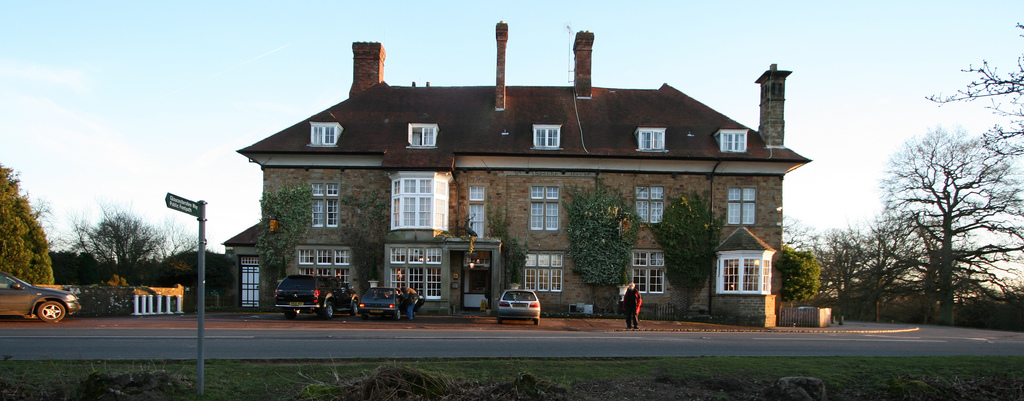
Speech House, Forest of Dean, February 2008

The Speech House is a hotel and former administrative building in the Forest of Dean in Gloucestershire, England, lying at the centre of the forest on the road from Coleford to Cinderford.

The building was originally constructed as a hunting lodge for Charles II and the Speech House was authorised by the Dean Forest Act 1667 (19 & 20 Cha. 2. c. 8) as part of a reorganisation of the open land in the area, and its construction was finished in 1682. It hosts the "Court of the Speech", a sort of parliament for the Verderers and Free Miners managing the forest, game, and mineral resources of the area. It was severely damaged in the Revolution of 1688, but repaired soon thereafter. Around 1840 it began to be used as an inn, and by the late 19th century it was functioning as a hotel, which (as of 2026) it continues to do.

To the southeast of Speech House is a small lake, Speech House Lake.

The Speech House Hotel was famous for its Speech House pudding, traditionally served in the verderers' court room that became the hotel's dining room. The recipe is a steamed or boiled sponge pudding that includes raspberry jam and is often served with a jam sauce. In both Good Things in England (1932) and Where Shall We Eat or Put Up? in England, Wales, Scotland, and Ireland (1936), Florence White called attention both to Speech House Hotel (it was also a Trust House at least up through 1951) and to the Speech House Pudding. In Good Things in England, White wrote that a "Miss Beaumont, of Sidmouth, Devon, says: 'This was given to a brother of mine at a little inn in the Forest of Dean. He thought the pudding good, and asked for the recipe.'" The recipe ingredients followed: 'Butter 2 oz; castor sugar 1 oz; eggs 2; flour 2 oz; raspberry jam 1 large tablespoonful; carbonate of soda 1/2 teaspoonful dissolved in a tablespoon of milk; jam."
