= Dean Forest Act 1861 =

Act of the Parliament of the United Kingdom

Dean Forest Act 1861 (Note: The citation of this Act by this short title was authorised by section 3 of, and schedule 3 to, the Statute Law (Repeals) Act 1977. Due to the repeal of those provisions, it is now authorised by section 19(2) of the Interpretation Act 1978.)
- Act of Parliament
- Parliament of the United Kingdom
- Long title: An Act to make further Provision for the Management of Her Majesty's Forest of Dean, and of the Mines and Quarries therein and in the Hundred of Saint Briavels in the County of Gloucester.
- Citation: 24 & 25 Vict. c. 40
- Territorial extent: United Kingdom

Dates
- Royal assent: 22 July 1861
- Commencement: 22 July 1861 (Note: The Acts of Parliament (Commencement) Act 1793.)
Other legislation
Amended by	Statute Law (Repeals) Act 1969; Wild Creatures and Forest Laws Act 1971; Dean Forest and New Forest Acts (Amendment) Regulations 1979

Status: Amended

Text of statute as originally enacted

Revised text of statute as amended

Text of the Dean Forest Act 1861 as in force today (including any amendments) within the United Kingdom, from legislation.gov.uk.

The Dean Forest Act 1861 (24 & 25 Vict. c. 40) is an act of the Parliament of the United Kingdom. It is a public general act. It was omitted from the third revised edition of the statutes because of its local and personal nature.

The act was partly in force in Great Britain at the end of 2010.

== Section 7 ==
In the case of any grant after the passing of the Dean Forest (Mines) Act 1904 (4 Edw. 7. c. clvi) of any gale to which that act applies section 7 of the Dean Forest Act 1861 (which relates to the cesser and refixing of rents and royalties) has effect as though such number of years not exceeding sixty-three as may be specified in the grant were substituted for twenty-one years in that section.

== Subsequent developments ==
The preamble to, and sections 2, 5, 6, 17, 22 and 27 of, the act were repealed by section 1 of, and part VII of the schedule to, the Statute Law (Repeals) Act 1969, which came into force on 1 January 1970. These provisions had been agreed by the Forestry Commission to be obsolete, spent, unnecessary or superseded.

Section 25 of the act was repealed by section 1(4) of, and the schedule to, the Wild Creatures and Forest Laws Act 1971, which came into force on 1 July 1971.

Section 26 was amended by paragraph 2 of the schedule to the Dean Forest and New Forest Acts (Amendment) Regulations 1979 (SI 1979/836).

== See also ==
- English land law
- Laws of the Forest of Dean and Hundred of Saint Briavels
