= Dean Forest Act 1667 =

Act of the Parliament of England

Dean Forest Act 1667 (Note: The citation of this act by this short title was authorised by section 1 of, and the first schedule to, the Short Titles Act 1896. Due to the repeal of those provisions it is now authorised by section 19(2) of the Interpretation Act 1978.)
- Act of Parliament
- Parliament of England
- Long title: An Act for the Increase and preservation of Timber within the Forest of Deane. (Note: These words are printed against this act in the second column of the first schedule to the Short Titles Act 1896, which is headed "Title".)
- Citation: 19 & 20 Cha. 2. c. 8 (Note: This is the citation in The Statutes of the Realm.); 20 Cha. 2. c. 3 (Note: This is the citation in The Statutes at Large.)
- Territorial extent: England and Wales

Dates
- Royal assent: 9 May 1668
- Commencement: 10 October 1667 (Note: Start of session.)
- Repealed: 1 July 1971
Other legislation
Amended by	Dean Forest (Mines) Act 1838
Repealed by	Dean Forest (Encroachments) Act 1838; Crown Estate Act 1961; Wild Creatures and Forest Laws Act 1971

Status: Repealed

Text of statute as originally enacted

The Dean Forest Act 1667 (19 & 20 Cha. 2. c. 8), sometimes called the Dean Forest (Reafforestation) Act 1667, the Dean Forest (Reafforestation) Act 1668, the Dean Reafforestation Act, (Note: Some sources hyphenate the word "Re-afforestation" in these popular names.) or the Forest of Dean Act 1668, was an act of the Parliament of England, concerning the Forest of Dean.

== Provisions ==
=== Preamble ===
[...] And that it shall and may be lawfull to and for his Majesty his Heires and Successors forthwith to inclose sever and improve within and out of the parts or places of the Waste Lands of the said Forrest or late Forrest of Deane [...]

Wood said that the expression "the late forest", in the preamble, no doubt referred to the proceedings taken for disafforesting in the year 16 Cha. 1. It was probably a question of policy to leave the validity or invalidity of those proceedings undecided; the act rendered them unimportant (see section 5).

=== Section 6 ===
And to the end the said Forrest and premisses may be perpetually preserved and estated in the Crowne for publique use as aforesaid and may not be granted or disposed to any private use or benefit Be it further enacted That in case any person or persons whatsoever shall presume to take or shall obtain any Gift Grant Estate or Interest of or in the said Inclosures or Wastes or any Wood or Trees growing thereon or of or in any of the Mines or Quarries of or within the said Inclosures or any part thereof Every such Gift Grant Estate and Interest shall ipso facto be null and void and the person or persons so taking or obtaining the same shall be and is hereby made and declared utterly disable and uncapable to have hold or enjoy any such Gift Grant Estate or Interest

This section was repealed by section 9(4) of, and part II of the third schedule to, the Crown Estate Act 1961.

Goodtitle v Baldwin (1809) was decided under this section.

=== Section 8 ===
And to the end some Recompense may be made to the persons whose right of Common and of Herbage within the said intended Inclosures is hereby taken from them for the necessary preservation of the said Timber as aforesaid Be it further enacted and declared by the authority aforesaid That it shall and may be lawfull to and for all and every the Owners Tennants and Occupiers of any the several Lands (lying within the Metes Limits and Boundaries of the said Forrest not being part of the said waste Ground or Inclosures) theire Heires Executors & Administrators respectively from time to time and att any time or times hereafter to cut down and dispose of any the Timber Trees Woods or Under woods growing or which shall hereafter grow or be in or upon theire several and respective Lands (lying within the Boundaries aforesaid not being part of the said waste Ground as aforesaid) att theire owne wills and pleasures without the Licenses of any Justice in Eyre or his Deputy and without the License and View of any Officer of the said Forrest whatsoever and alsoe without incurring any Offence against the Forrest Law or any Forfeiture or Penalty touching the same and alsoe to manure and improve the said several Lands and Tenements by plowing assarting digging inclosing fencing or building upon the same att theire wills and pleasures and to keepe any sort of Dogs unexpeditated and to hunt and kill any Beast of Chase or other Game in or upon the said several Lands as if the same were not lying within the Bounds of any Forrest

Wood said that the effect of this section would seem to be that the lands there referred to, other than the inclosures and wastes, practically ceased to be considered part of the forest, which in time (as would appear from the perambulation of 1788), came to be considered as limited to the "23,000 acres or thereabouts" (see sections 1 and 6), and any lands surrounded by those inclosures and wastes, and the detached wastes of the Hudnalls, Fence, Bearce, Wallmore and Northwoods Green.

=== Section 17 ===
Provided alwaies and be it futher enacted by the authority aforesaid That any Lease or Leases made or to be made by his Majesty His Heires or Successors to any person or persons whatsoever for any terme or termes of yeares not exceeding the terme of One and thirty yeares in possession of the Coalmines and Quarries of Grindeston in the said Forrest or any part thereof shall be of like force as if this Act had never been made Except of such Coalmines as are or shall be in any part of the Eleven thousand Acres allotted for his Majesties Inclosure and as shall continue inclosed.

Wood said this section was at least impliedly repealed by section 23 of the Dean Forest (Mines) Act 1838 (1 & 2 Vict. c. 43).

Wood said there is an obvious error in the last sentence of section 17. The probable meaning was "in any part of the 11,000 acres allotted for His Majesty's inclosure so long as the same shall continue inclosed".

== Subsequent developments ==
The whole act, so far as unrepealed, was repealed by section 1(4) of, and the schedule to, the Wild Creatures and Forest Laws Act 1971, which came into force on 1 July 1971. Section 1(6) of the 1971 act provides that, notwithstanding the repeal, by section 1 of that act, of the act, the verderers in the Forest of Dean shall continue to be elected and hold office as at the passing of the act.

Cyril Hart said that the Dean Forest Act 1667 is "important".

Walkley v Fox (1914) was decided under this act.

== See also ==
- English land law
- Laws of the Forest of Dean and Hundred of Saint Briavels

== Bibliography ==
- Halsbury's Statutes
- Wood, James G. (1878). "Dean Forest (Re-afforestation) Act, 1668". The Laws of the Dean Forest and Hundred of Saint Briavels, in the County of Gloucester. Chancery Lane, London: H Sweet. pp. 25-34. See also pages 4, 18, 19, 37, 49, 74, 82, 83, 85, 117, 121, 122, 128 and 167.
- John Raithby, ed. (1819). "Charles II, 1667 & 1668: An Act for the Increase and preservation of Timber within the Forest of Deane". The Statutes of the Realm: volume 5: 1628-80. Institute of Historical Research.
- Gordon, W. A. (1955). The Law of Forestry. Her Majesty's Stationery Office. pp. 76, 78.
- The English and Empire Digest. Butterworth & Co. Bell Yard, Temple Bar, London. 1922. Volume 11. Page 575.
- Hart, Cyril (1995). The Forest of Dean: New History, 1550-1818. Alan Sutton Publishing Limited. pp. xxi, xxii, 23, 33, 98, 162, 164, 166, 178, 182, 184, 185, 195, 197, 199, 200, 202, 204, 209, 210, 211, 213, 217, 226, 246, 248, 293 and 295.
- Hart, Cyril (1966). Royal Forest: A History of Dean's Woods as Producers of Timber. Oxford: Clarendon Press. pp. 169, 179, 184, 189, 194, 196, 199, 202, 211, 213, 224, 291 to 295, 301, 303 and passim.
- Hart, Cyril (1971). The Industrial History of Dean: With an Introduction to Its Industrial Archaeology. Newton Abbott: David and Charles. pp. 61, 258, 299 and 328.
- Warmington, A. R. Civil War, Interregnum and Restoration in Gloucestershire, 1640-1672. The Boydell: The Royal Historical Society. pp. 198–199.
