= Dean Forest Act 1819 =

Act of the Parliament of the United Kingdom

Dean Forest Act 1819 (Note: The citation of this act by this short title was authorised by section 3 of, and schedule 3 to, the Statute Law (Repeals) Act 1977. Due to the repeal of those provisions, it is now authorised by section 19(2) of the Interpretation Act 1978.)
- Act of Parliament
- Parliament of the United Kingdom
- Long title: An Act [for regulating the Exercise of the Right of Common of Pasture in the New Forest in the County of Southampton; for repealing certain Parts of Two Acts passed in the Thirty ninth and Fortieth and the Fifty second Years of His present Majesty and] (Note: The words in brackets were repealed by part IX of the schedule to the Statute Law (Repeals) Act 1971.) for the better collection and recovery of the Gale Rents in the Forest of Dean, in the County of Gloucester.
- Citation: 59 Geo. 3. c. 86
- Territorial extent: United Kingdom

Dates
- Royal assent: 7 July 1819
- Commencement: 7 July 1819 (Note: Section 1.)
Other legislation
Amends	New Forest Act 1800; Duchy of Lancaster Act 1812
Amended by	Wild Creatures and Forest Laws Act 1971; Statute Law (Repeals) Act 1971; Statute Law (Repeals) Act 1977
Relates to	Dean Forest (Mines) Act 1871

Status: Amended

Text of statute as originally enacted

Revised text of statute as amended

Text of the Dean Forest Act 1819 as in force today (including any amendments) within the United Kingdom, from legislation.gov.uk.

The Dean Forest Act 1819 (59 Geo. 3. c. 86) is an act of the Parliament of the United Kingdom.

== Subsequent developments ==
Sections 1 to 6 were repealed by section 1(4) of, and the schedule to, the Wild Creatures and Forest Laws Act 1971, which came into force on 1 July 1971.

In the title, the words from " for regulating " to " His present Majesty; and ", the preamble, in section 7, the words " now due and owing or,", the words " to His Majesty " and the words from " and in case the goods and chattels distrained shall be replevied " onwards, in section 8, the words " now due, or " and the words from " and in all such actions " onwards, and sections 9–11 of the act were repealed by section 1 of, and part IX of the schedule to, the Statute Law (Repeals) Act 1971, which came into force on 27 July 1971.

== See also ==
- English land law
- Laws of the Forest of Dean and Hundred of Saint Briavels
