= New Forest Act 1800 =

Act of the Parliament of Great Britain

New Forest Act 1800 (Note: The citation of this act by this short title was authorised by section 5 of, and the second schedule to, the Statute Law Revision Act 1948. Due to the repeal of those provisions, it is now authorised by section 19(2) of the Interpretation Act 1978.)
- Act of Parliament
- Parliament of Great Britain
- Long title: An Act for the better Preservation of Timber in the New Forest in the County of Southampton; and for ascertaining the Boundaries of the said Forest and of the lands of the Crown within the same. (Note: These words are printed against this act in the second column of the second schedule to the Statute Law Revision Act 1948, which is headed "Title".)
- Citation: 39 & 40 Geo. 3. c. 86
- Territorial extent: Great Britain

Dates
- Royal assent: 28 July 1800
- Commencement: 28 July 1800 (Note: The Acts of Parliament (Commencement) Act 1793.)
- Repealed: 1 July 1971
Other legislation
Amended by	New Forest Act 1801; New Forest Act 1810; Dean Forest Act 1819
Repealed by	Wild Creatures and Forest Laws Act 1971

Status: Repealed

Text of statute as originally enacted

The New Forest Act 1800 (39 & 40 Geo. 3. c. 86) was an act of the Parliament of Great Britain.

== Subsequent developments ==
So much of the act as subjected certain officers therein mentioned to forfeiture and deprivation of their offices for the offences in this act mentioned was repealed and made void by section 6 of the Dean Forest Act 1819 (59 Geo. 3. c. 86). The marginal note to that section said that the effect of this was to repeal section 23 of the New Forest Act 1800. This repeal was subject to a proviso.

The whole act was repealed by section 1(4) of, and the schedule to, the Wild Creatures and Forest Laws Act 1971, which came into force on 1 July 1971.
