= Dean Forest Act 1842 =

Act of the Parliament of the United Kingdom

Dean Forest Act 1842 (Note: The citation of this act by this short title was authorised by section 5 of, and the second schedule to, the Statute Law Revision Act 1948. Due to the repeal of those provisions, it is now authorised by section 19(2) of the Interpretation Act 1978.)
- Act of Parliament
- Parliament of the United Kingdom
- Long title: An Act to divide the Forest of Dean in the County of Gloucester into Ecclesiastical Districts. (Note: These words are printed against this act in the second column of the second schedule to the Statute Law Revision Act 1948, which is headed "Title".)
- Citation: 5 & 6 Vict. c. 65
- Territorial extent: United Kingdom

Dates
- Royal assent: 30 July 1842
- Commencement: 30 July 1842 (Note: The Acts of Parliament (Commencement) Act 1793.)
- Repealed: 1 July 1971
Other legislation
Repealed by	Wild Creatures and Forest Laws Act 1971

Status: Repealed

Text of statute as originally enacted

The Dean Forest Act 1842 (5 & 6 Vict. c. 65), sometimes referred to as the Ecclesiastical Districts in Forest of Dean Act 1842, was an act of the Parliament of the United Kingdom.

== Subsequent developments ==
The whole act was repealed by section 1(4) of, and the schedule to, the Wild Creatures and Forest Laws Act 1971, which came into force on 1 July 1971.

== See also ==
- English land law
- Laws of the Forest of Dean and Hundred of Saint Briavels
