= Importation Act 1667 =

Act of the Parliament of England

- Act of Parliament
- Parliament of England
- Long title: An Additional Act against the Importation of Forreign Cattel.
- Citation: 19 & 20 Cha. 2. c. 12 (Note: This is the citation in The Statutes of the Realm.); 20 Cha. 2. c. 7 (Note: This is the citation in The Statutes at Large.)
- Territorial extent: England and Wales

Dates
- Royal assent: 9 May 1668
- Commencement: 10 October 1667 (Note: Start of session.)
- Repealed: 28 July 1863
Other legislation
Repealed by	Statute Law Revision Act 1863

Status: Repealed

Text of statute as originally enacted

The Importation Act 1667 (19 & 20 Cha. 2. c. 12) was an act of the Parliament of England which banned Irish cattle from being sold in England.

The bill was first introduced in 1663 and proved extremely contentious. It was the work of George Villiers, 2nd Duke of Buckingham, who saw it as a means to injure his enemies James Butler, 1st Duke of Ormonde and Edward Hyde, 1st Earl of Clarendon. Ormonde, Lord Lieutenant of Ireland, believed that it would prevent any proper economic development in Ireland, while Clarendon, though he was not greatly interested in Irish affairs, promised Ormonde, his close friend and ally in government, to use his authority to see it defeated. Its passage would therefore greatly weaken them politically, and correspondingly strengthen Buckingham.

Buckingham said that "whoever was against the bill had either an Irish interest or an Irish understanding", giving great offence to Ormonde and his family as a result, but his difficulty was that England did not have a single "interest". The bill was strongly supported by those whom Samuel Pepys called "the Western gentlemen", the landed gentlemen of the North and West of England, and Wales, who believed that the bill would increase the value of their cattle. It was opposed by the graziers of Norfolk and Suffolk, who made their living partly by fattening Irish cattle, and by Londoners, who were the biggest market for Irish beef. Pepys also reports fears, unfounded in the event, that passing the bill would lead to a repetition of the Irish Rebellion of 1641.

In September 1666, against government opposition, the bill was reintroduced in the House of Commons. Pepys thought that this was "against the general sense of the House" but that the "Western gentlemen" might carry it by a small majority. Clarendon until too late was confident that the two Houses would reject it or that if all else failed the King would veto it; but preoccupied as he was with the Second Anglo-Dutch War, he seriously underestimated his opponents. Sir William Coventry, more realistically, warned Ormonde that in his view it would pass the Commons, that the House of Lords would make no difficulty, and that the king, embroiled with domestic problems and the Dutch war, would not risk offending Parliament by using his veto. Coventry's predictions were correct: although the King gave his assent with great reluctance, he was acting on Parliament's unofficial pledge to pass two crucial financial Bills on condition that the Importation Bill become law, as it duly did in January 1667. The King's "very sharp speech" to the Lords on 18 January, which Pepys mentions in his diary, is an indication of his displeasure at having to assent to the act.

== Subsequent developments ==
The whole act was repealed by section 1 of, and the schedule to, the Statute Law Revision Act 1863 (26 & 27 Vict. c. 125), which came into force on 28 July 1863.

== Bibliography ==
- Scottish Society, 1707-1830: Beyond Jacobitism, Towards Industrialisation, Christopher A Whatley, Manchester University Press
- 'Charles II, 1667 & 1668: An Additional Act against the Importation of Forreign Cattel', Statutes of the Realm: volume 5: 1628-80 (1819), pp. 641–42. URL: http://www.british-history.ac.uk/report.aspx?compid=47407 Retrieved 6 March 2007.
- The Diary of Samuel Pepys, R.C. Latham and W. Matthews editors, Volumes VII and VIII.
- Ollard, Richard Clarendon and his Friends Macmillans 1987
