= Cyril Hart (forester) =

English forester and historian (1913–2009)

Cyril Edwin Hart OBE (22 March 1913 – 9 May 2009) was an English forestry expert, author, and historian.

He was appointed as one of the four verderers of the Forest of Dean in 1952, and was the longest serving Senior Verderer of Verderer's Court, from 1962 until his death in 2009. A Fellow of the Royal Historical Society, he was generally regarded as the preeminent expert on medieval forest law and lore in the Forest of Dean. Hart acted as a forestry consultant throughout the UK and was the chairman of nursery and sawmill companies. His textbook Practical Forestry for the Agent and Surveyor was used as a main reference work by generations of forestry students, and his illustrated work British Trees in Colour remains popular with those with a general interest in British trees and forestry.

== Early life and education ==
Born in Coleford in 1913, Hart went to Bells Grammar School in the town. He studied for his first degree in botany at London University, and then went on to receive an MA at the University of Bristol in 1955. His Masters Thesis was entitled "The Dean Forest Eyre of 1282". In 1976 he received an MSc from the University of Oxford presenting a thesis Practical Private Forestry in a Changing Environment. He went on to receive a doctorate in forestry history from Leicester University.

== Verderer of the Forest of Dean ==
Hart was elected as one of the Forest of Dean's four verderers, a post involving the oversight of the forest's trees and animals, in 1952, and remained in post until his death.

== Land management and other interests ==
After the Second World War, Hart worked for Major Charles Penrhyn Ackers, ex High Sheriff of Gloucestershire and owner of the Huntley Estate and Huntley Manor, first as land agent and later as manager of Forest Products Ltd and Woodland Improvement Ltd, companies associated with the estate. Hart was inspired by Major Ackers who had a national reputation as a silviculturist, was the author of a standard book on forestry, and planted specimens of many varieties in the park of his home at Huntley Manor.

In 1948, Hart co-founded and later became secretary and president of the Forest of Dean Local History Society. He purchased nine acres of land surrounding the mound of the Old Castle of Dean at Littledean, said to be the first castle built beyond the Severn against the Welsh, donating it to the Dean Heritage Centre in 1982. He donated his archives of document transcriptions to the Gloucestershire Record Office. His other books and papers became the Cyril Hart Collection, housed at the Forestry Commission offices at Bank House in Coleford.

In postwar years he became chairman of Forest of Dean Newspapers, a privately owned company which published the local papers covering the area. In 1981 he was appointed OBE for services to forestry. In 1999 he was honoured by having The Forest of Dean Arboretum near Speech House was named the Cyril Hart Arboretum in his honour in 1999.

== Authorship ==
Hart was the author of many books and articles. His first article, published in 1947, was The Extent and Boundaries of the Forest of Dean and Hundred of St Briavels. He wrote The Verderers and Speech-Court of the Forest of Dean (1950), The Commoners of Dean Forest (1951), The Free Miners of the Royal Forest of Dean and Hundred of St Briavels (1953), and Royal Forest: A History of Dean’s Woods as Producers of Timber (1966).

His 1966 work Nicholls's Forest Of Dean was published by David & Charles. Royal Forest (1966), published by the Oxford University Press, is a history of one of Britain's two remaining royal hunting forests. In 1967 Dr Hart first published Practical Forestry for the Agent and Surveyor, which became a standard textbook for foresters and forestry students for more than thirty years.

Returning to his historical research, in 1967 he published Archaeology in Dean: a tribute to Dr C Scott-Garrett, MBE. This was followed in 1971 by both The Industrial History of Dean and The Verderers and Forest Laws of Dean. In 1974 he collaborated with Charles Raymond on his most popular general book, British Trees in Colour, which became an invaluable visual guide to tree identification throughout Britain. After being accused of lacking the common touch in his writing, he produced Coleford: The History of a West Gloucestershire town (1983). While never formally retiring, he devoted more of his later life to private study. His last practical forestry book was Taxation of Woodlands in 1986. Later works include The Regard of the Forest of Dene in 1282 (1987), The Forest of Dean: New History 1550–1818 (1995), and Between Severn (Saefern) and Wye (Waege) in the Year 1000: A Prelude to the Norman Forest of Dean in Glowecestscire and Herefordscire (2000).

He refused to have his popular and rare titles republished, instead undertaking new versions of the Verderers book, The Free Miners of the Forest of Dean, and The Commoners of Dean Forest for the Lightmoor Press, a local publishing house.

== Death ==
Cyril Hart died in Coleford on 9 May 2009 aged 96, predeceased by his wife, Doris, and survived by his two children.
