= Crown Estate Act 1961 =

Act of the Parliament of the United Kingdom

Crown Estate Act 1961 (Note: Section 10(1).)
- Act of Parliament
- Parliament of the United Kingdom
- Long title: An Act to make new provision in place of the Crown Lands Acts, 1829 to 1936, as to the powers exercisable by the Crown Estate Commissioners for the management of the Crown Estate, to transfer to the management of the Minister of Works certain land of the Crown Estate in Regent's Park and extend or clarify the powers of that Minister in Regent's Park, to amend the Forestry (Transfer of Woods) Act, 1923, as it affects the Crown Estate, to amend the law as to escheated land, and for purposes connected therewith.
- Citation: 9 & 10 Eliz. 2. c. 55
- Territorial extent: United Kingdom (Note: Section 10(2).)

Dates
- Royal assent: 27 July 1961
- Commencement: 27 July 1961 (Note: The Acts of Parliament (Commencement) Act 1793.)
Other legislation
Amends	Crown Lands Act 1702; Universities (Scotland) Act 1889; Light Railways Act 1896; See § Repealed enactments
Repeals/revokes	See § Repealed enactments
Amended by	Forestry Act 1967; Wild Creatures and Forest Laws Act 1971; Statute Law (Repeals) Act 1974; Land Tenure Reform (Scotland) Act 1974; Miscellaneous Financial Provisions Act 1983; Statute Law (Repeals) Act 1993; Scotland Act 2012; Scotland Act 2016; Church Property Measure 2018; Zoological Society of London (Leases) Act 2024; Crown Estate Act 2025

Status: Amended

Text of statute as originally enacted

Revised text of statute as amended

Text of the Crown Estate Act 1961 as in force today (including any amendments) within the United Kingdom, from legislation.gov.uk.

The Crown Estate Act 1961 (9 & 10 Eliz. 2. c. 55) is an act of the Parliament of the United Kingdom that consolidated and replaced the Crown Lands Acts 1829 to 1936 governing the management of the Crown Estate in the United Kingdom.

== Repealed enactments ==
Section 9(4) of the act repealed 85 enactments, listed in parts I and II of the third schedule to the act.

Part I – Spent or obsolete enactments
Citation	Short title	Description	Extent of repeal
34 Edw. 1	Ordinatio Foreste	Ordinatio Foreste	Cap. 5, and cap. 6 from "And moreover" onwards.
34 Edw. 1	Prerogativa Regis	Prerogativa Regis	In cap. 17, the words "knight's fees", "and dowers when they fall", "fees", and "dowers".
6 Hen. 8. c. 15	Letters Patent (Avoidance) Act 1514	An Act avoiding second letters patent granted by the King.	The whole act.
20 Geo. 2. c. 50	Tenures Abolition Act 1746	The Tenures Abolition Act, 1746.	Sections fourteen and fifteen.
20 Geo. 2. c. 51	Sales to the Crown Act 1746	The Sales to the Crown Act, 1746.	The whole act.
59 Geo. 3. c. 94	Crown Land Act 1819	The Crown Land Act, 1819.	The whole act, except as respects Scotland.
6 Geo. 4. c. 17	Crown Lands Act 1825	The Crown Lands Act, 1825.	The whole act.
3 & 4 Will. 4. c. 99	Fines Act 1833	The Fines Act, 1833.	Sections twelve and thirteen.
6 & 7 Will. 4. c. 19	Durham (County Palatine) Act 1836	The Durham (County Palatine) Act, 1836.	In section one, the words from "and all forfeitures" to "in right of the same", and section nine.
6 & 7 Will. 4. c. 28	Government Offices Security Act 1836	The Government Offices Security Act, 1836.	In section one, the words "or of the chief commissioner of His Majesty's woods, forests, land revenues, works and buildings" and "or chief commissioner"; in section two, the words "and for such chief commissioner"; in section three, the words "the said chief commissioner"; in section five, the words "or the said chief commissioner" and "such chief commissioner"; in section seven, the words "nor the said chief commissioner"; in section eight, the words "or of such chief commissioner" and "such chief commissioner"; in section ten, the words "such chief commissioner"; and in the form of certificate in the Schedule, the words "or to the Chief Commissioner of His Majesty's Woods, Forests, Land Revenues, Works and Buildings".
6 & 7 Will. 4. c. 49	Rolls Estate (Demise) Act 1836	An Act to enable the Master of the Rolls to demise part of the Rolls Estate to the Society of Judges and Serjeants.	The whole act.
7 Will. 4 & 1 Vict. c. 46	Rolls Estate Act 1837	The Rolls Estate Act, 1837.	Sections one, two and five, the Schedule and the preamble.
1 & 2 Vict. c. 61	Government Offices Security Act 1838	The Government Offices Security Act, 1838.	In section one, the words "or of the said chief commissioner" and "or of such chief commissioner"; in section two, the words "and for such chief commissioner", the words "such chief commissioner," and the words "chief commissioner" in both the other places where they occur.
7 & 8 Vict. c. 89	Commissioners of Woods (Audit) Act 1844	The Commissioners of Woods (Audit) Act, 1844.	The whole act.
21 & 22 Vict. c. 45	Durham County Palatine Act 1858	The Durham County Palatine Act, 1858.	Section two except the words "nothing in this Act contained shall extend to the island called Holy Island situate in that part of the County Palatine of Durham called Islandshire"; section three; in section four, the words "in the manner prescribed by the Crown Lands Act, 1829"; sections five and six; and the preamble.
21 & 22 Vict. c. 72	Landed Estates Court (Ireland) Act 1858	The Landed Estates Court (Ireland) Act, 1858.	In section sixty-two, the words "or apportion"; section sixty-eight from the beginning to "otherwise; and" and the words from "to purchase, with" to "made or".
31 & 32 Vict. c. 45	Sea Fisheries Act 1868	The Sea Fisheries Act, 1868.	In section forty-six, the words "but is not under the management of the Board of Trade".
42 & 43 Vict. c. 73	Commissioners of Woods (Thames Piers) Act 1879	The Commissioners of Woods (Thames Piers) Act, 1879.	The whole act.
47 & 48 Vict. c. 71	Intestates Estates Act 1884	The Intestates Estates Act, 1884.	Sections four, six and seven as they apply in Northern Ireland to the estates of persons dying after the beginning of January, nineteen hundred and fifty-six.
54 & 55 Vict. c. 66	Local Registration of Title (Ireland) Act 1891	The Local Registration of Title (Ireland) Act, 1891.	In section seventy-nine, the words from "and if" to "Board of Trade" and the words "or Board, as the case may be".
3 Edw. 7. c. 31	Board of Agriculture and Fisheries Act 1903	The Board of Agriculture and Fisheries Act, 1903.	In section one, subsection (7).
3 Edw. 7. c. 37	Irish Land Act 1903	The Irish Land Act, 1903.	In section sixty-one, subsections (4) and (5).
13 & 14 Geo. 5. c. 16	Salmon and Freshwater Fisheries Act 1923	The Salmon and Freshwater Fisheries Act, 1923.	In section forty-two, paragraph (b) and the word "other" in paragraph (e); in section ninety, the words from "and under" to "Trade respectively", the words "or the Board of Trade, as the case may be", and the words from "which consent onwards".
15 & 16 Geo. 5. c. 21	Land Registration Act 1925	The Land Registration Act, 1925.	In section ninety-seven, in subsection (1), the words "to the Board of Trade, and", the word "also" in each place where it occurs, and the word "other" in paragraph (d).
20 & 21 Geo. 5. c. 44	Land Drainage Act 1930	The Land Drainage Act, 1930.	In section seventy-seven, in subsection (1), the words "or the Board of Trade" and the words "or the Board" in paragraph (a).
12, 13 & 14 Geo. 6. c. 74	Coast Protection Act 1949	The Coast Protection Act, 1949.	Part III.

Part II – General
Citation	Short title	Description	Extent of repeal
19 & 20 Car. 2. c. 8	Dean Forest Act 1667	The Dean Forest Act, 1667.	Section six.
42 Geo. 3. c. 116	Land Tax Redemption Act 1802	The Land Tax Redemption Act, 1802.	In section one hundred and thirty-one, the words from "for the surveyor general of the land revenues" to "and", where next occurring; in section one hundred and forty-six, the words "of the land revenue of the Crown, or", and the word "respective" in both places.
48 Geo. 3. c. 72	Dean and New Forests Act 1808	The Dean and New Forests Act, 1808.	Section six.
50 Geo. 3. c. ccxviii	East Bere Forest Act 1810	An Act for disafforesting the forest of South, otherwise East Bere otherwise Bier, in the county of Southampton, and for inclosing the open commonable lands within the said forest.	Section thirty-four, from "and shall" onwards.
52 Geo. 3. c. 71	Forest of Woolmer Act 1812	An Act for the better cultivation of navy timber in the Forest of Woolmer, in the County of Southampton.	Section three.
52 Geo. 3. c. 72	Alice Holt Forest Act 1812	An Act for the better cultivation of navy timber in the Forest of Alice Holt, in the County of Southampton.	Section four.
52 Geo. 3. c. clxxi	Parkhurst Forest Act 1812	An Act for disafforesting the forest of Parkhurst in the county of Southampton, and for inclosing the open commonable lands within the said forest.	Sections thirty-nine and forty, section fifty-one from "such lands" onwards.
53 Geo. 3. c. 158	Windsor Forest Act 1813	An Act for vesting in His Majesty certain parts of Windsor Forest in the County of Berks; and for inclosing the open commonable land within the said forest.	Sections thirty-eight to forty.
55 Geo. 3. c. 138	Forest of Exmoor Act 1815	An Act for vesting in His Majesty certain parts of the Forest of Exmoor in the Counties of Somerset and Devon; and for inclosing the said forest.	Sections sixty-seven to sixty-nine.
55 Geo. 3. c. 190	Brecknock Forest Act 1815	An Act to amend an Act made in the forty-eighth year of His present Majesty, to improve the land revenue of the Crown, so far as relates to the Great Forest of Brecknock in the County of Brecknock; and for vesting in His Majesty certain parts of the said forest; and for inclosing the said forest.	Sections two to four.
7 Geo. 4. c. 77	Crown Lands (Carlton Palace) Act 1826	A title which begins with the words "An Act to extend to Charing Cross" and ends with the words "to enable the Commissioners of His Majesty's Woods, Forests and Land Revenues to grant leases of the site of Carlton Palace".	Sections seventy-seven to seventy-nine.
10 Geo. 4. c. 50	Crown Lands Act 1829	The Crown Lands Act, 1829.	The whole act, except in so far as it is continued in force by Part I of the Second Schedule to this act.
1 & 2 Will. 4. c. 32	Game Act 1831	The Game Act, 1831.	In section nine, the words from "nor the powers" to "land revenues of the Crown".
2 & 3 Will. 4. c. 1	Crown Lands Act 1832	The Crown Lands Act, 1832.	The whole act.
2 & 3 Will. 4. c. 112	Crown Lands (Scotland) Act 1832	The Crown Lands (Scotland) Act, 1832.	The whole act.
3 & 4 Will. 4. c. 69	Crown Lands Act 1833	The Crown Lands Act, 1833. (Note: Incorrectly printed as "The Crown Lands (Scotland) Act, 1833".)	The whole act, except in so far as sections seven and eight are continued in force by Part I of the Second Schedule to this act.
5 & 6 Will. 4. c. 58	Crown Lands (Scotland) Act 1835	The Crown Lands (Scotland) Act, 1835.	Section one and the preamble.
5 & 6 Will. 4. c. 62	Statutory Declarations Act 1835	The Statutory Declarations Act, 1835.	In section two, the words "the office of woods and forests, land revenues, works, and buildings."
1 & 2 Vict. c. 42	Dean Forest (Encroachments) Act 1838	The Dean Forest (Encroachments) Act, 1838.	Sections five and thirteen.
4 & 5 Vict. c. 40	Crown Lands (City of London) Act 1841	A title which begins with the words "An Act to empower" and ends with the words "City of London".	The whole act.
5 Vict. c. 1	Crown Lands Act 1841	The Crown Lands Act, 1841.	The whole act.
5 & 6 Vict. c. 94	Defence Act 1842	The Defence Act, 1842.	Section forty.
7 & 8 Vict. c. 1	Crown Lands (City of London) Act 1844	A title which begins with the words "An Act to enlarge" and ends with the words "City of London".	The whole act.
8 & 9 Vict. c. 99	Crown Lands Act 1845	The Crown Lands Act, 1845.	The whole act.
11 & 12 Vict. c. 102	Crown Lands Act 1848	The Crown Lands Act, 1848.	The whole act, so far as unrepealed.
14 & 15 Vict. c. 42	Crown Lands Act 1851	The Crown Lands Act, 1851.	The whole act, except sections fifteen, twenty-one, twenty-two and twenty-three and the entry in the Schedule relating to the Act 7 & 8 Victoria c. 60; in section twenty-two, the words "or First Commissioner", wherever occurring, the words "except as hereinafter provided", in both places, the words "of Woods or" and the words from "as the case may be" onwards.
14 & 15 Vict. c. 43	Forest of Hainault Act 1851	An Act for disafforesting the Forest of Hainault in the County of Essex.	Section twelve.
14 & 15 Vict. c. 46	Crown Lands (Copyholds) Act 1851	The Crown Lands (Copyholds) Act, 1851.	The whole act, so far as unrepealed.
14 & 15 Vict. c. 76	New Forest Act 1851	The New Forest Act, 1851.	Section eight.
15 & 16 Vict. c. 62	Crown Lands Act 1852	The Crown Lands Act, 1852.	The whole act.
16 & 17 Vict. c. 36	Whichwood Disafforesting Act 1853	The Whichwood Disafforesting Act, 1853.	Section twenty-nine from "and it shall be lawful" onwards.
16 & 17 Vict. c. 42	Whittlewood Disafforesting Act 1853	The Whittlewood Disafforesting Act, 1853.	Section twenty from "and it shall be lawful" onwards.
16 & 17 Vict. c. 56	Crown Lands Act 1853	The Crown Lands Act, 1853.	Sections five to eight and the preamble.
18 & 19 Vict. c. 16	Crown Lands Act 1855	The Crown Lands Act, 1855.	The whole act.
18 & 19 Vict. c. 46	Forest of Woolmer Act 1855	An Act for disafforesting the Forest of Woolmer.	Section fourteen.
19 & 20 Vict. c. 13	Forest of Delamere Act 1856	An Act to make provision for the management of certain lands belonging to Her Majesty within the former limits of the late Forest of Delamere in the County of Chester.	The whole act.
29 & 30 Vict. c. 62	Crown Lands Act 1866	The Crown Lands Act, 1866.	The whole act, so far as unrepealed.
29 & 30 Vict. c. 70	Dean Forest (Walmore Common) Act 1866	An Act to extend the provisions for the inclosure, exchange and improvement of land in certain portions of the Forest of Dean called Walmore Common and the Bearce Common, and for authorizing allotments in lieu of the forestal rights of Her Majesty in and over such commons.	Section three.
36 & 37 Vict. c. 36	Crown Lands Act 1873	The Crown Lands Act, 1873.	The whole act, so far as unrepealed.
47 & 48 Vict. c. 54	Yorkshire Registries Act 1884	The Yorkshire Registries Act, 1884.	Section thirty, except as respects assurances executed or made before the commencement of this act.
48 & 49 Vict. c. 79	Crown Lands Act 1885	The Crown Lands Act, 1885.	The whole act, so far as unrepealed.
50 & 51 Vict. c. 53	Escheat (Procedure) Act 1887	The Escheat (Procedure) Act, 1887.	In section two, in subsection (1), the words from "inquiries" to "or the holding of", and subsection (3).
54 & 55 Vict. c. 66	Local Registration of Title (Ireland) Act 1891	The Local Registration of Title (Ireland) Act, 1891.	In section seventy-eight, in subsection (3), the words "in the office of Land Revenue Records and Enrolments", except as respects registrations made before the commencement of this act.
55 & 56 Vict. c. 43	Military Lands Act 1892	The Military Lands Act, 1892.	In section ten, subsection (1) to the word "Crown", but without prejudice to the operation of subsection (2); in section twenty-four, the words from the first "or" to the second "Forest"; section twenty-seven, to the word "aforesaid".
57 & 58 Vict. c. 43	Crown Lands Act 1894	The Crown Lands Act, 1894.	The whole act, except section six.
2 Edw. 7. c. 37	Osborne Estate Act 1902	The Osborne Estate Act, 1902.	In section one, subsection (3) to the word "but".
6 Edw. 7. c. 28	Crown Lands Act 1906	The Crown Lands Act, 1906.	Sections five and eight.
8 Edw. 7. c. 36	Small Holdings and Allotments Act 1908	The Small Holdings and Allotments Act, 1908.	In section forty, in subsection (2), the words from "in" where that word first occurs to "Treasury".
13 & 14 Geo. 5. c. 21	Forestry (Transfer of Woods) Act 1923	The Forestry (Transfer of Woods) Act, 1923.	In subsection (1) of section one the words "Commissioners of Woods or other" and paragraph (a).
17 & 18 Geo. 5. c. 23	Crown Lands Act 1927	The Crown Lands Act, 1927.	The whole act, except section thirteen; and in section thirteen, paragraph (a) of subsection (1) and subsections (2) and (3).
17 & 18 Geo. 5. c. 36	Landlord and Tenant Act 1927	The Landlord and Tenant Act, 1927.	In the Second Schedule, in Part I, sub-paragraph (b) of paragraph 1.
26 Geo. 5 & 1 Edw. 8. c. 47	Crown Lands Act 1936	The Crown Lands Act, 1936.	Sections six to eight; in section nine, paragraph (a) of subsection (1), and in subsection (3) the words "of the Royal Botanic Gardens, Kew, or" and the words "as the case may be"; subsection (3) of section ten.
1 Edw. 8 & 1 Geo. 6. c. 35	Statutory Salaries Act 1937	The Statutory Salaries Act, 1937.	In section two, in subsection (1), the words "of the Commissioners of Crown Lands".
8 & 9 Geo. 6. c. 12	Northern Ireland (Miscellaneous Provisions) Act 1945	The Northern Ireland (Miscellaneous Provisions) Act, 1945.	Section ten.
11 & 12 Geo. 6. c. 63	Agricultural Holdings Act 1948	The Agricultural Holdings Act, 1948.	In section eighty-seven, subsection (3).
12, 13 & 14 Geo. 6. c. 75	Agricultural Holdings (Scotland) Act 1949	The Agricultural Holdings (Scotland) Act, 1949.	In section eighty-six, subsection (3).
2 & 3 Eliz. 2. c. 56	Landlord and Tenant Act 1954	The Landlord and Tenant Act, 1954.	In the Eighth Schedule, paragraph 3.
4 & 5 Eliz. 2. c. 73	Crown Estate Act 1956	The Crown Estate Act, 1956.	The whole act.
6 & 7 Eliz. 2. c. 63	Park Lane Improvement Act 1958	The Park Lane Improvement Act, 1958.	In section sixteen, in subsection (4), the words from "and the Crown Lands Acts" to "accordingly".

== Subsequent developments ==
The act was amended by the Crown Estate Act 2025, which came into force on 11 May 2025. The 2025 act increased the maximum number of Crown Estate Commissioners from eight to twelve, required the appointment of commissioners with specific responsibilities for Wales, Northern Ireland and England respectively, placed the Commissioners under a duty to keep under review the impact of their activities on sustainable development in the United Kingdom, granted the Commissioners a new power to borrow money, and added a new section 3A requiring Treasury consent for the disposal of territorial seabed.
