= Cyril Hart (politician) =

Cyril Godwin Hart

Member, Federal House of Representative(Nigeria) representing Degema/Bonny Constituency
- Incumbent
- Assumed office 12 June 2023
- Constituency: Degema/Bonny Island

Personal details
- Party: People Democratic Party

Cyril Godwin Hart (born 25 April 1978) is a Nigerian politician and lawmaker representing Degema/Bonny Constituency of Rivers state at the Federal House of Representatives (Nigeria).

== Early life, education and career ==
Hart was born on 25 April 1978. He holds bachelor's degree in food engineering from the University of Uyo, and later served as the Former Board Commissioner, Rivers State Universal Basic Education Board.

== Political career ==
Hart started his political career as the chairman of Bonny Island Local Government Council of Rivers State, Nigeria and in May 2022 he emerged as the candidate representing Degema/Bonny Island at the Nigerian House of Representatives the Peoples Democratic Party (PDP) in Rivers State. He eventually won the election and was sworn in June 2023.

During a plenary, Hart walked out of the session, accusing the deputy speaker of discriminating against new members during parliamentary debates.
