= Wild Creatures and Forest Laws Act 1971 =

Act of the Parliament of the United Kingdom

Wild Creatures and Forest Laws Act 1971 (Note: Section 2(1).)
- Act of Parliament
- Parliament of the United Kingdom
- Long title: An Act to abolish certain rights of Her Majesty to wild creatures and certain related rights and franchises; to abrogate the forest law (subject to exceptions); and to repeal enactments relating to those rights and franchises and to forests and the forest law; and for connected purposes.
- Citation: 1971 c. 47
- Territorial extent: England and Wales; Northern Ireland; Scotland (repeal of section 2 of the Night Poaching Act 1828; (Note: Section 2(2)–(3).)

Dates
- Royal assent: 1 July 1971
- Commencement: 1 July 1971 (Note: The Acts of Parliament (Commencement) Act 1793.)
Other legislation
Amends	See § Repealed enactments
Repeals/revokes	See § Repealed enactments
Amended by	Northern Ireland Constitution Act 1973
Relates to	Night Poaching Act 1828; See Statute Law (Repeals) Act

Status: Amended

Text of statute as originally enacted

Revised text of statute as amended

Text of the Wild Creatures and Forest Laws Act 1971 as in force today (including any amendments) within the United Kingdom, from legislation.gov.uk.

The Wild Creatures and Forest Laws Act 1971 (c. 47) is an act of the Parliament of the United Kingdom.

== Background ==
The act implemented recommendations contained in the second report on statute law revision by the Law Commission.

== Provisions ==
Section 1(1) repealed the longest standing statute in England, the Charter of the Forest 1217, by abolishing “any prerogative right of Her Majesty to wild creatures (except royal fish and swans) together with any prerogative right to set aside land or water for the breeding, support or taking of wild creatures; and any franchises of forest, free chase, park or free warren.” This preserved Crown rights of ownership over royal fish (whales and sturgeons) and mute swans.

=== Repealed enactments ===
Section 1(4) of the act repealed 63 enactments, listed in the schedule to the act.

Enactments repealed by section 1(4)
Citation	Short title	Description	Extent of repeal
25 Edw. 1 (1297)	Charter of the Forest	The Charter of the Forest.	The whole statute, so far as unrepealed.
25 Edw. 1 (1297)	Confirmatio Cartarum	(Confirmation of the Charters).	In chapter I, the words "and the Charter of the Forest", where first occurring, and the words "and the Charter of the Forest for the wealth of our realm".
33 Edw. 1 (1305)	Ordinance of the Forest 1305	An Ordinance of the Forest.	The whole statute.
34 Edw. 1 (1306)	Ordinance of the Forest 1306	An Ordinance of the Forest.	The whole statute, so far as unrepealed.
Stat. Temp. Incert.	Customs and Assise of the Forest	The Customs and Assise of the Forest.	The whole statute.
1 Edw. 3. Stat. 2 (1327)	N/A	(Botes in forest).	Chapter 2.
25 Edw. 3. Stat. 5 (1351)	N/A	(Limit on demand of puture in forest).	Chapter 7.
7 Hen. 4 (1405)	N/A	(Confirmation of Liberties).	The words "and the Charter of the Forest".
4 Hen. 5. Stat. 2 (1416)	N/A	(Confirmation of Charters and Statutes).	The words "and the Charter of the Forest".
27 Hen. 8. c. 7	Forests of Wales Act 1535	An Act for the abuses in the forests of Wales.	The whole act.
16 Chas. 1. c. 16	Delimitation of Forests Act 1640	The Delimitation of Forests Act 1640.	The whole act.
19 & 20 Chas. 2. c. 8	Dean Forest Act 1667	The Dean Forest Act 1667.	The whole act, so far as unrepealed.
9 Will. 3. c. 33	New Forest Act 1697	The New Forest Act 1697.	The whole act.
39 & 40 Geo. 3. c. 86	New Forest Act 1800	The New Forest Act 1800.	The whole act.
41 Geo. 3. c. 108	New Forest Act 1801	An Act for enabling His Majesty to grant commissions for executing an Act made in the 39th and 40th years of the reign of His present Majesty, intituled An Act for the better preservation of timber in the New Forest in the county of Southampton, and for ascertaining the boundaries of the said forest, and of the lands of the Crown within the same.	The whole act.
48 Geo. 3. c. 72	Dean and New Forests Act 1808	The Dean and New Forests Act 1808.	The preamble. Sections 1 and 2. In section 3 the words from the beginning to "be it enacted that"; the words "and New Forest respectively"; the words "in the said forests respectively" in both places; the words "and six thousand acres in the New Forest", in both places; the words from "and the quantities, butts and boundaries" to "of record for ever"; and the words "the said recited Acts and," in both places. In section 4 the words from "the lord high treasurer" to "shall determine that"; and the words "the said recited Acts or". Sections 5 and 7.
50 Geo. 3. c. 116	New Forest Act 1810	An Act to extend and amend the terms and provisions of an Act of the 39th and 40th years of His present Majesty for the better preservation of timber in the New Forest in the county of Southampton, and for ascertaining the boundaries of the said forest, and of the lands of the Crown within the same.	The whole act.
50 Geo. 3. c. ccxviii	Bere Forest Inclosure Act 1810	An Act for disafforesting the forest of South, otherwise East Bere otherwise Bier, in the county of Southampton, and for inclosing the open commonable lands within the said forest.	The whole act, so far as unrepealed.
52 Geo. 3. c. 71	Woolmer Forest Act 1812	An Act for the better cultivation of navy timber in the forest of Woolmer, in the county of Southampton.	The whole act, so far as unrepealed.
52 Geo. 3. c. 72	Alice Holt Forest Act 1812	An Act for the better cultivation of navy timber in the forest of Alice Holt in the county of Southampton.	The whole act, so far as unrepealed.
52 Geo. 3. c. clxxi	Parkhurst Forest Disafforestation and Inclosure Act 1812	An Act for disafforesting the forest of Parkhurst in the county of Southampton, and for inclosing the open commonable lands within the said forest.	The whole act, so far as unrepealed.
53 Geo. 3. c. 158	Windsor Forest Act 1813	An Act for vesting in His Majesty certain parts of Windsor Forest in the county of Berks; and for inclosing the open commonable lands within the said forest.	The whole act, except sections 75 to 79 and 89.
55 Geo. 3. c. 122	Windsor Forest Act 1815	An Act to amend an Act of the 53rd year of His present Majesty, for vesting in His Majesty certain parts of Windsor Forest, in the county of Berks; and for inclosing the open commonable lands within the said forest.	The whole act.
55 Geo. 3. c. 138	Exmoor Forest Act 1815	An Act for vesting in His Majesty certain parts of the forest of Exmoor in the counties of Somerset and Devon; and for inclosing the said forest.	The whole act, so far as unrepealed.
55 Geo. 3. c. 190	Brecknock Forest Act 1815	An Act to amend an Act made in the 48th year of His present Majesty, to improve the land revenue of the Crown, so far as relates to the Great Forest of Brecknock in the county of Brecknock; and for vesting in His Majesty certain parts of the said forest; and for inclosing the said forest.	The whole act, so far as unrepealed.
56 Geo. 3. c. 132	Windsor Forest Act 1816	An Act for enlarging the time for making the award respecting His Majesty's allotments under an Act of the 53rd year of His present Majesty, for inclosing Windsor Forest; and for extending the provisions of the said Act.	The whole act.
58 Geo. 3. c. 99	Brecknock Forest Act 1818	An Act for altering and amending an Act made in the 55th year of His present Majesty, to amend an Act made in the 48th year of His present Majesty, to improve the land revenue of the Crown, so far as relates to the Great Forest of Brecknock in the county of Brecknock; and for vesting in His Majesty certain parts of the said forest; and for inclosing the said forest.	The whole act.
58 Geo. 3. c. 100	Sherwood Forest Act 1818	An Act for vesting in His Majesty certain parts of the Hayes of Birkland and Bilhagh, and of certain commonable lands and open uninclosed grounds in the township of Edwinstowe, within the forest of Sherwood, in the county of Nottingham.	The whole act.
59 Geo. 3. c. 86	Dean Forest Act 1819	An Act for regulating the exercise of the right of common of pasture in the New Forest, in the county of Southampton, for repealing certain parts of two Acts passed in the 39th and 40th and the 52nd years of His present Majesty; and for the better collection and recovery of the gale rents in the forest of Dean, in the county of Gloucester.	Sections 1 to 6.
1 & 2 Geo. 4. c. 52	Duchy of Lancaster Act 1821	An Act to improve the land revenues of the Crown, and of His Majesty's Duchy of Lancaster, and for making provisions and regulations for the better management thereof.	Sections 12 and 13.
5 Geo. 4. c. 99	Whittlewood Forest Act 1824	An Act for dividing, allotting and inclosing that portion of the forest of Whittlewood called Hasleborough Walk in the parish of Whitfield and liberties or precincts of Silston otherwise Silverston otherwise Silveston Burnham in the county of Northampton, and of the open fields of Silston otherwise Silverston otherwise Silveston Burnham aforesaid.	The whole act.
6 Geo. 4. c. 132	Salcey Forest Inclosure Act 1825	An Act for dividing, allotting, and inclosing the forest of Salcey, in the counties of Northampton and Buckingham; and of certain lands in the parish of Hartwell in the said county of Northampton.	The whole act.
9 Geo. 4. c. 69	Night Poaching Act 1828	The Night Poaching Act 1828.	In section 2, the words from "or for any person" to the words "free chase thereon".
10 Geo. 4. c. 50	Crown Lands Act 1829	The Crown Lands Act 1829.	The whole act, so far as unrepealed.
1 & 2 Will. 4. c. 32	Game Act 1831	The Game Act 1831.	In section 8 the words "of any lord or owner of any forest, chase or warren". Section 9 from "nor the rights" where first occurring onwards. In section 31 the words "or upon any of His Majesty's forests, parks, chases or warrens," and the words from "or for the warden" to "warren" where next occurring. In section 32 the words "or in any of His Majesty's forests, parks, chases or warrens". Section 33. In section 35 the words from "nor to any person" to "free chase," where last occurring. In section 36 the words "or in any of His Majesty's forests, parks, chases or warrens", the words from "for any officer" to "warren or," and the words "forest, park, chase or warren," where last occurring.
6 & 7 Will. 4. c. 3	Forest of Dean Act 1836	An Act for vesting the office of constable of the castle of St. Briavel's in the First Commissioner of His Majesty's Woods, Forests, Land Revenues, Works and Buildings; and for vesting the office of keeper of the forest of Dean in the county of Gloucester in the Commissioners of His Majesty's Woods, Forests, Land Revenues, Works and Buildings.	The whole act.
1 & 2 Vict. c. 42	Dean Forest (Encroachments) Act 1838	The Dean Forest (Encroachments) Act 1838.	The whole act, so far as unrepealed.
5 & 6 Vict. c. 65	Dean Forest Act 1842	The Dean Forest Act 1842.	The whole act.
7 & 8 Vict. c. 13	Dean Forest Act 1844	An Act to extend until the 1st day of January 1845, and to the end of the then next session of Parliament the time within which conveyances may be made on behalf of the Crown of and disputes settled with regard to encroachments in the forest of Dean.	The whole act.
12 & 13 Vict. c. 81	New Forest and Waltham Forest Act 1849	An Act to authorise Her Majesty to issue a Commission to inquire into and report upon rights or claims over the New Forest in the county of Southampton and Waltham Forest in the county of Essex.	The whole act.
14 & 15 Vict. c. 43	Hainault Forest Act 1851	An Act for disafforesting the forest of Hainault in the county of Essex.	The whole act, so far as unrepealed.
14 & 15 Vict. c. 76	New Forest Act 1851	The New Forest Act 1851.	The whole act, so far as unrepealed.
16 & 17 Vict. c. 36	Whichwood Disafforesting Act 1853	The Whichwood Disafforesting Act 1853.	The whole act, so far as unrepealed.
16 & 17 Vict. c. 42	Whittlewood Disafforesting Act 1853	The Whittlewood Disafforesting Act 1853.	The whole act, so far as unrepealed.
17 & 18 Vict. c. 49	New Forest Act 1854	An Act for the settlement of claims upon and over the New Forest.	The whole act.
18 & 19 Vict. c. 46	Woolmer Forest Act 1855	An Act for disafforesting the forest of Woolmer.	The whole act, so far as unrepealed.
19 & 20 Vict. c. 32	Whichwood Disafforesting Amendment Act 1856	The Whichwood Disafforesting Amendment Act 1856.	The whole act.
21 & 22 Vict. c. 37	Hainault Forest (Allotment of Commons) Act 1858	The Hainault Forest (Allotment of Commons) Act 1858.	The whole act.
24 & 25 Vict. c. 40	Dean Forest Act 1861	An Act to make further provision for the management of Her Majesty's forest of Dean, and of the mines and quarries therein and in the hundred of Saint Briavel's in the county of Gloucester.	Section 25.
29 & 30 Vict. c. 70	Walmore and Bearce Commons, Forest of Dean Act 1866	An Act to extend the provisions for the inclosure, exchange and improvement of land in certain portions of the forest of Dean called Walmore Common and the Bearce Common, and for authorising allotments in lieu of the forestal rights of Her Majesty in and over such commons.	The whole act, so far as unrepealed.
33 & 34 Vict. c. viii	Abbot's Wood (Dean Forest) Act 1870	The Abbot's Wood (Dean Forest) Act 1870.	The whole act, except section 9.
34 & 35 Vict. c. 93	Epping Forest Act 1871	The Epping Forest Act 1871.	The whole act.
35 & 36 Vict. c. 95	Epping Forest Amendment Act 1872	The Epping Forest Amendment Act 1872.	The whole act.
36 Vict. c. 5	Epping Forest Act 1873	The Epping Forest Act 1873.	The whole act.
38 Vict. c. 6	Epping Forest Act 1875	The Epping Forest Act 1875.	The whole act.
40 & 41 Vict. c. cxxi	New Forest Act 1877	The New Forest Act 1877.	Section 5. In section 9, the words from the beginning to "winter heyning", where first occurring, and the words from "If default" onwards. Sections 10 to 12. In section 23(4) the words "purprestures" and "purpresture".
46 & 47 Vict. c. lxxxvi	New Forest Highways Act 1883	The New Forest Highways Act 1883.	The whole act.
46 & 47 Vict. c. lxxxvii	East and West Dean (Highways) Act 1883	The East and West Dean (Highways) Act 1883.	The whole act.
2 Edw. 7. c. cxcviii	New Forest (Sale of Lands for Public Purposes) Act 1902	The New Forest (Sale of Lands for Public Purposes) Act 1902.	The whole act.
6 Edw. 7. c. cxix	Dean Forest Act 1906	The Dean Forest Act 1906.	Section 1.
5 & 6 Eliz. 2. c. 56	Housing Act 1957	The Housing Act 1957.	Section 102.
8 & 9 Eliz. 2. c. 36	Game Laws (Amendment) Act 1960	The Game Laws (Amendment) Act 1960.	In section 2(1) the words "or section thirty-three". Section 5(2).
9 & 10 Eliz. 2. c. 55	Crown Estate Act 1961	The Crown Estate Act 1961.	In Schedule 2, paragraph 2(a).

== Subsequent developments ==
In section 2(3), the words from "and" onwards were repealed by section 41(1) of, and part I of schedule 6 to, the Northern Ireland Constitution Act 1973, which came into force on 18 July 1973.

== See also ==
- English land law
- UK environmental law
- Charter of the Forest 1217

== Bibliography ==
- Halsbury's Statutes
