= Dean Forest (Encroachments) Act 1838 =

Act of the Parliament of the United Kingdom

Dean Forest (Encroachments) Act 1838 (Note: The citation of this act by this short title was authorised by section 5 of, and the second schedule to, the Statute Law Revision Act 1948. Due to the repeal of those provisions, it is now authorised by section 19(2) of the Interpretation Act 1978.)
- Act of Parliament
- Parliament of the United Kingdom
- Long title: An Act to empower the Commissioners of Her Majesty's Woods, Forests and Land Revenues to confirm the Titles to, and to grant Leases of, Encroachments in the Forest of Dean in the County of Gloucester. (Note: These words are printed against this act in the second column of the second schedule to the Statute Law Revision Act 1948, which is headed "Title".)
- Citation: 1 & 2 Vict. c. 42
- Territorial extent: United Kingdom

Dates
- Royal assent: 27 July 1838
- Commencement: 27 July 1838 (Note: The Acts of Parliament (Commencement) Act 1793.)
- Repealed: 1 July 1971
Other legislation
| Amends | Dean Forest Act 1667 |
| Repealed by | Crown Estate Act 1961; Wild Creatures and Forest Laws Act 1971 |

Status: Repealed

Text of statute as originally enacted

The Dean Forest (Encroachments) Act 1838 (1 & 2 Vict. c. 42) was an act of the Parliament of the United Kingdom relating to the Forest of Dean.

== Subsequent developments ==
Sections 5 and 13 of the act were repealed by section 9(4) of, and part II of the third schedule to, the Crown Estate Act 1961 (9 & 10 Eliz. 2. c. 55), which came into force on 27 July 1961.

The whole act, so far as unrepealed, was repealed by section 1(4) of, and the schedule to, the Wild Creatures and Forest Laws Act 1971, which came into force on 1 July 1971.

== See also ==
- English land law
- Laws of the Forest of Dean and Hundred of Saint Briavels
