= List of acts of the Parliament of England from 1667 =

This is a list of acts of the Parliament of England for the year 1667.

For acts passed during the period 1707–1800, see the list of acts of the Parliament of Great Britain. See also the list of acts of the Parliament of Scotland, and the list of acts of the Parliament of Ireland.

For acts passed from 1801 onwards, see the list of acts of the Parliament of the United Kingdom. For acts of the devolved parliaments and assemblies in the United Kingdom, see the list of acts of the Scottish Parliament, the list of acts of the Northern Ireland Assembly, and the list of acts and measures of Senedd Cymru; see also the list of acts of the Parliament of Northern Ireland.

For medieval statutes, etc. that are not considered to be acts of Parliament, see the list of English statutes.

See also the List of ordinances and acts of the Parliament of England, 1642–1660 for ordinances and acts passed by the Long Parliament and other bodies without royal assent, and which were not considered to be valid legislation following the Restoration in 1660.

The number shown after each act's title is its chapter number. Acts are cited using this number, preceded by the years of the reign during which the relevant parliamentary session was held; thus the Union with Ireland Act 1800 is cited as "39 & 40 Geo. 3. c. 67", meaning the 67th act passed during the session that started in the 39th year of the reign of George III and which finished in the 40th year of that reign. The modern convention is to use Arabic numerals in citations (thus "41 Geo. 3" rather than "41 Geo. III"). Acts of the last session of the Parliament of Great Britain and the first session of the Parliament of the United Kingdom are both cited as "41 Geo. 3".

Acts passed by the Parliament of England did not have a short title; however, some of these acts have subsequently been given a short title by acts of the Parliament of the United Kingdom, such as the Short Titles Act 1896 (59 & 60 Vict. c. 14).

Acts passed by the Parliament of England were deemed to have come into effect on the first day of the session in which they were passed. Because of this, the years given in the list below may in fact be the year before a particular act was passed.

== 19 & 20 Cha. 2 ==
The first and second parts of the seventh session of the 2nd Parliament of King Charles II (the 'Cavalier Parliament') which met from 10 October 1667 until 19 December 1667, and then from 10 February 1668 until 9 May 1668.

This session was also traditionally cited as 19 & 20 Car. 2, 19 & 20 Chas. 2 or 19 & 20 C. 2.

=== Public acts ===
- cc. 1–5 are from the seventh session of the Cavalier Parliament (10 October 1667 – 19 December 1667)
- cc. 6–13 are from the seventh session (continued) of Cavalier Parliament (10 February 1668 – 9 May 1668)

Cited as "19 & 20 Car. 2" (19 & 20 Cha. 2) in The Statutes of the Realm, but separately as "19 Car. 2" (19 Cha. 2) and "20 Car. 2" (20 Cha. 2) in Ruffhead-Pickering The Statutes at Large. Equivalences: 19 & 20 Cha. 2 (cc. 1–5) = 19 Cha. 2 (cc. 9–13); 19 & 20 Cha. 2 (cc. 6–13) = 20 Cha. 2 (cc. 1–8).

Short title	Citation	Royal assent
Long title
Accounts of Public Moneys Act 1667 (repealed)	19 & 20 Cha. 2. c. 1 (Note: This is the chapter in The Statutes of the Realm.); 19 Cha. 2. c. 9 (Note: This is the chapter in the Statutes at Large.)	19 December 1667
An Act for taking the Accompts of the severall Somms of Money therein mencioned. (Repealed by Statute Law Revision Act 1863 (26 & 27 Vict. c. 125))
Earl of Clarendon Act 1667 (repealed)	19 & 20 Cha. 2. c. 2; 19 Cha. 2. c. 10	19 December 1667
An Act for banishing and disenabling the Earl of Clarendon. (Repealed by Statute Law Revision Act 1948 (11 & 12 Geo. 6. c. 62))
Prize Ships Act 1667 (repealed)	19 & 20 Cha. 2. c. 3; 19 Cha. 2. c. 11	19 December 1667
An Act to make Prize Ships free for Trade. (Repealed for England and Wales by Statute Law Revision Act 1863 (26 & 27 Vict. c. 125) and for Northern Ireland by Statute Law Revision Act 1950 (14 Geo. 6. c. 6))
Exchequer Orders Act 1667 (repealed)	19 & 20 Cha. 2. c. 4; 19 Cha. 2. c. 12	19 December 1667
An Act for assigning Orders in the Exchequer without Revocation. (Repealed by Statute Law Revision Act 1863 (26 & 27 Vict. c. 125))
Trade Act 1667 (repealed)	19 & 20 Cha. 2. c. 5; 19 Cha. 2. c. 13	19 December 1667
An Act for setling Freedome and Intercourse of Trade between England and Scotland. (Repealed by Statute Law Revision Act 1863 (26 & 27 Vict. c. 125))
Taxation Act 1667 (repealed)	19 & 20 Cha. 2. c. 6; 20 Cha. 2. c. 1	9 May 1668
An Act for raising Three hundred and ten thousand pounds by an Imposition on Wines and other Liquors. (Repealed by Statute Law Revision Act 1863 (26 & 27 Vict. c. 125))
Public Accountants Act 1667 (repealed)	19 & 20 Cha. 2. c. 7; 20 Cha. 2. c. 2	9 May 1668
An Act for the better Payment of Moneys received for the Use of the Crown. (Repealed by Statute Law Revision Act 1863 (26 & 27 Vict. c. 125))
Dean Forest Act 1667 or the Dean Forest (Reafforestation) Act 1667 or the Dean Forest (Reafforestation) Act 1668 or the Dean Reafforestation Act 1667 or the Forest of Dean Act 1668 (repealed)	19 & 20 Cha. 2. c. 8; 20 Cha. 2. c. 3	9 May 1668
An Act for the Increase and preservation of Timber within the Forest of Deane. (Repealed by Dean Forest (Encroachments) Act 1838 (1 & 2 Vict. c. 42), Crown Estate Act 1961 (9 & 10 Eliz. 2. c. 55) and Wild Creatures and Forest Laws Act 1971 (c. 47))
Error Act 1667 (repealed)	19 & 20 Cha. 2. c. 9; 20 Cha. 2. c. 4	9 May 1668
An Act for proceeding to Judgement on Writs of Error brought in the Exchequer. (Repealed by Statute Law Revision Act 1863 (26 & 27 Vict. c. 125))
Exportation Act 1667 (repealed)	19 & 20 Cha. 2. c. 10; 20 Cha. 2. c. 5	9 May 1668
An Act for giving Liberty to buy and export Leather and Skins tanned or dressed. (Repealed by Statute Law Revision Act 1863 (26 & 27 Vict. c. 125))
Silk Throwing Act 1667 (repealed)	19 & 20 Cha. 2. c. 11; 20 Cha. 2. c. 6	9 May 1668
An Act to regulate the Trade of Silk Throwing. (Repealed by Statute Law Revision Act 1863 (26 & 27 Vict. c. 125))
Importation Act 1667 (repealed)	19 & 20 Cha. 2. c. 12; 20 Cha. 2. c. 7	9 May 1668
An Additional Act against the Importation of Forreign Cattel. (Repealed by Statute Law Revision Act 1863 (26 & 27 Vict. c. 125))
Bedford Level Act 1667	19 & 20 Cha. 2. c. 13 (Note: Also listed as 19 & 20 Cha. 2. c. 8 Pr.); 20 Cha. 2 c. 8	9 May 1668
An Act for the taxing and assessing of the Lands of the Adventurers within the Great Levell of the Fenns.

=== Private acts ===
Short title	Citation	Royal assent
Long title
Earl of Clare's Estate Act 1667	19 & 20 Cha. 2. c. 1 Pr.	19 December 1667
An Act for settling Part of the Possessions of John late Earl of Clare, deceased, and enabling Gilbert Earl of Clare, his Son and Heir, to dispose of some other Part thereof, for Payment of Debts and Portions.
Enabling Bishop of Durham to lease certain lead mines for three lives.	19 & 20 Cha. 2. c. 2 Pr.	19 December 1667
An Act to enable John Lord Bishop of Durham, and his Successors, to make Leases for Three Lives of certain Lead Mines.
Confirmation of an exchange of lands between Horatio Lord Townsend and the Rector of East and West Raynham (Norfolk).	19 & 20 Cha. 2. c. 3 Pr.	19 December 1667
An Act for Confirmation of an Exchange of certain Lands, between Horatio Lord Townsend and the Rector of East and West Reynham, in the County of Norfolke.
Naturalization of Alvaro de Costa and Others Act 1667	19 & 20 Cha. 2. c. 4 Pr.	19 December 1667
An Act for the Naturalization of Alvaro da Costa and others.
Settling of lands on Sir Richard Wiseman and John Plott for better performance of a trust.	19 & 20 Cha. 2. c. 5 Pr.	19 December 1667
An Act for settling the Lands therein mentioned upon Sir Richard Wiseman and John Plott, and their Heirs, to enable them the better to perform a Trust.
Exchange of lands and manors of William Palmes for other lands settled upon him and his issue by his wife Mary.	19 & 20 Cha. 2. c. 6 Pr.	19 December 1667
An Act for exchanging certain Manors and Lands of William Palmes Esquire, for other Lands settled upon him and his Issue by Mary his Wife.
Fire of London Indemnity Act 1667	19 & 20 Cha. 2. c. 7 Pr.	9 May 1668
An Act to indemnify the late Sheriffs of the City of London, and the Warden of The Fleete, touching the Escapes of Prisoners, and other Matters occasioned by the late Fire.
Bedford Level Act 1667	19 & 20 Cha. 2. c. 8 Pr. (Note: Also listed as 19 & 20 Cha. 2. c. 13.)	9 May 1668
An Act for the taxing and assessing of the Lands of the Adventurers within the Great Level of the Fens.
Sir Thomas Leventhorp's Estate Act 1667	19 & 20 Cha. 2. c. 9 Pr.	9 May 1668
An Act for settling of certain Manors, Lands, and Tenements, of Sir Thomas Leventhorpe Baronet, in the Counties of Essex and Hertford.
Sir Thomas Heblethwaite's Estate Act 1667	19 & 20 Cha. 2. c. 10 Pr.	9 May 1668
An Act to enable Sir Thomas Hebblethwayte to sell or dispose of Lands, to pay Debts, and make Provision for Younger Children.
Lucy Estates Act 1667	19 & 20 Cha. 2. c. 11 Pr.	9 May 1668
An Act for Confirmation of the Settlement of the Estate of Sir Kingsmill Lucy Baronet, in the said Act mentioned; and for transferring over some Parts of the Real Estate of Sir Richard Lucy Knight and Baronet, deceased, from Francis Lucy Esquire.
Horton Inclosure etc. Act 1667	19 & 20 Cha. 2. c. 12 Pr.	9 May 1668
An Act to confirm an Agreement between William Paston Esquire, Lord of the Manor of Horton, and the Tenants of the said Manor, for an Enclosure of Part of the Wastes of the said Manor, for the Preservation and Growth of Wood and Timber.
William Juxon late Archbishop of Canterbury Estate Act 1667	19 & 20 Cha. 2. c. 13 Pr.	9 May 1668
An Act for enabling of Sir William Juxon Knight and Baronet, Executor of the last Will and Testament of William Juxon late Lord Archbishop of Canterbury, to recover Part of his Estate.
Earl of Sussex's Estate Act 1667	19 & 20 Cha. 2. c. 14 Pr.	9 May 1668
An Act for the better securing a Portion of Five Thousand Pounds to and for the Lady Francis Savile, and Infant, Daughter of Thomas late Earl of Sussex, deceased, out of Part of the Estate of James Earl of Sussex, also an Infant, in Pursuance of the Will of the said Thomas Earl of Sussex.
Dawes Wimondseld's Estate Act 1667	19 & 20 Cha. 2. c. 15 Pr.	9 May 1668
An Act on the Behalf of Dawes Wymondsall Esquire, for settling certain Customary Lands, held of the Manor of Wimbleton, in the County of Surrey.
Richard Tayler's Trust Act 1667	19 & 20 Cha. 2. c. 16 Pr.	9 May 1668
An Act for enabling the Execution of a Trust, for Payment of the Debts, and providing for the Younger Children, of Richard Taylor Esquire, deceased.
Sir Charles Stanley's Estate Act 1667	19 & 20 Cha. 2. c. 17 Pr.	9 May 1668
An Act for enabling Trustees to make Leases, for Payment of the Debts, and providing for the Children, of Sir Charles Stanley.

=== Sources ===
- Raithby, John, ed. (1963) [1819]. "19° & 20° Car. II.". Statutes of the Realm. Vol. 5: The Statutes of King Charles I and King Charles II (1625–1680). London: Dawsons. pp. 624–647 – via HathiTrust.
- Raithby, John, ed. (1819). Statutes of the Realm. Vol. 5: 1628-80 – via British History Online.
- Pickering, Danby, ed. (1763). "Anno vicesimo Caroli II". The Statutes at Large. Vol. 8: From the Twelfth Year of King Charles II to the Last Year of King James II. Inclusive. Cambridge: Joseph Bentham. pp. 257–271 – via Internet Archive.
- Chronological Table of and Index to the Statutes. Vol. 1: To the End of the Session 59 Vict. Sess. 2 (1895) (13th ed.). London: Her Majesty's Stationery Office. 1896. pp. 71–72 – via Google Books.
- Chronological Table of the Statutes: Covering the Period from 1235 to the End of 1971. London: Her Majesty's Stationery Office. 1972. p. 69. ISBN 978-0-11-840096-1 – via Google Books.
- "Chronological Tables of the Private and Personal Acts: Part 3 (1660–1680)". legislation.gov.uk. The National Archives.

== See also ==
- List of acts of the Parliament of England
