= Juries in England and Wales =

Law of trial by jury in England and Wales

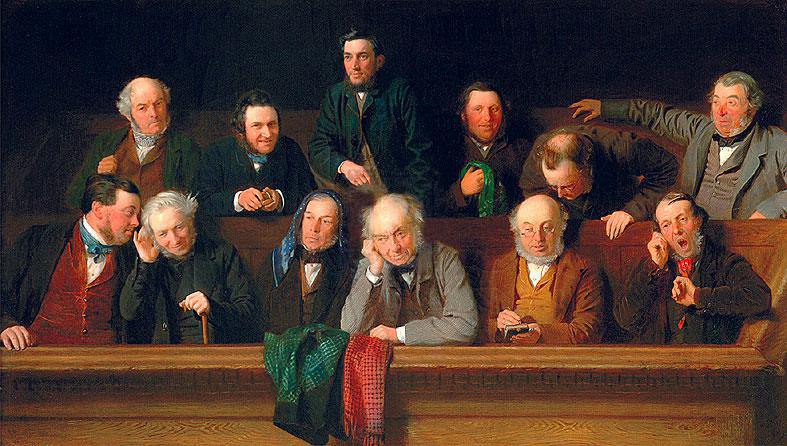
The Jury by John Morgan (1861). Juries were all male at this time.

In the legal jurisdiction of England and Wales, there is a long tradition of jury trial that has evolved over centuries. Under present-day practice, juries are generally summoned for criminal trials in the Crown Court where the offence is an indictable offence or an offence triable either way. All common law civil cases were tried by jury until the introduction of juryless trials in the new county courts in 1846, and thereafter the use of juries in civil cases steadily declined. Liability to be called upon for jury service is covered by the Juries Act 1974.

== History ==
The English jury has its roots in two institutions that date from before the Norman Conquest in 1066. The inquest, as a means of settling a fact, had developed in Scandinavia and the Carolingian Empire while Anglo-Saxon law had used a "jury of accusation" to establish the strength of the allegation against a criminal suspect. In the latter case, the jury were not triers of fact and, if the accusation was seen as posing a case to answer, guilt or innocence were established by oath, often in the form of compurgation, or trial by ordeal. During the 11th and 12th centuries, juries were sworn to decide property disputes but it was the Roman Catholic Church's withdrawal of support for trial by ordeal in 1215 that necessitated the development of the jury in its modern form.

The jury had always been a socially exclusive institution, and historically people had to own land of a particular value in order to qualify. Until 1919, women were automatically disqualified from serving on trial juries, and even after that date local prejudices had the effect of keeping women off the jury. Few women satisfied the property qualifications until they were abolished in the 1970s, and this also heavily restricted the number of women eligible for jury service.

== Criminal juries ==
Juries are summoned for criminal trials in the Crown Court where the offence is an indictable offence or an offence triable either way that has been sent to the Crown Court after examination by magistrates. Magistrates have the power to send any offence triable either way to the Crown Court but, even if they elect to try the case themselves, the accused retains the right to elect for a Crown Court trial with a jury. Summary offences are tried by magistrates and there is no right of Crown Court trial by jury. During the 21st century some exceptions to jury trial in the Crown Court have been developed.

=== Trial without a jury ===
Crown Court trial without a jury is permitted in cases of suspected jury tampering where there is evidence of a "real and present danger" and, despite the possibility of police protection, there is a substantial likelihood of tampering, and a trial without a jury is in the interests of justice. The first such prosecution application was made in February 2008. The first criminal trial in a crown court without a jury was approved in 2009.

There are also provisions under the Domestic Violence, Crime and Victims Act 2004, ss.17–20 to try defendants accused of domestic violence on sample counts and, on conviction, for the remainder of the counts to be tried by a judge alone. These provisions came into force on 8 January 2007.

If the defendant pleads autrefois (i.e. claims that he has already been acquitted or convicted of the offences charged), the judge now decides the matter without a jury.

Between 1973 and 2007 trials in Northern Ireland could be held without a jury in special courts known as Diplock courts.

=== Majority verdicts ===
Majority verdicts have been allowed in England and Wales since the Criminal Justice Act 1967. Before this all criminal convictions required a unanimous verdict. The exact majority required depends on the number of jurors, and failure to reach this threshold may lead to a retrial. The judge should press the jury for a unanimous verdict. In the Crown Court the judge must not, in any event, suggest that a majority is acceptable until after 2 hours and 10 minutes. This was originally 2 hours but it was extended to allow time for the jury to settle after retiring. In practice the majority verdict direction is often given after much longer than the minimum two hours required.

When the jury is called to deliver a verdict after majority directions have been given, a careful protocol of questions is followed: only in the event of a guilty verdict is it asked whether all jurors were agreed on that verdict, to prevent any acquittal from being tainted by it being disclosed that any jurors dissented. The protocol is followed separately for each charge. Majority verdicts are treated the same as unanimous ones, for example they are not taken as a mitigating factor during sentencing.

== Inquests ==
A senior coroner may hear an inquest without a jury unless the senior coroner has reason to suspect that the death occurred in custody or otherwise in state detention and that either the cause of death was a violent or unnatural one or the cause of death is unknown; or the death resulted from the act or omission of a police officer or a member of a service police force, in the purported execution of the officer's or member's duty as such; or that the death was caused by a notifiable accident, poisoning or disease, as defined in the Health and Safety at Work etc. Act 1974. An inquest into a death may be held with a jury if the senior coroner thinks that there is sufficient reason for doing so.

== Civil juries ==
All common law civil cases were tried by jury up to the introduction of juryless trials in the new county courts in 1846. The perceived success of this system, together with increasing recognition of the integrity of judges and the professionalisation of legal institutions, meant that, when the Common Law Procedure Act 1854 gave litigants in the Queen's Bench the option of trial by judge alone, there was a steady uptake. Over the next eighty years, the use of juries in civil trials steadily declined.

In 1933 the Administration of Justice (Miscellaneous Provisions) Act 1933, s.6 guaranteed the right of jury trial in the Queen's Bench Division for:

- Fraud
- Libel
- Slander
- Malicious prosecution
- False imprisonment
- Seduction
- Breach of promise of marriage

The 1933 Act also provided that: "but, save as aforesaid, any action to be tried in that Division may, in the discretion of the court or a judge, be ordered to be tried either with or without a jury." The Act brought a de facto end to civil jury trials in England and Wales save for the causes where the right was guaranteed.

In Ward v James, Lord Denning, delivering the judgment of the Court of Appeal, held that personal injury cases were unsuitable for jury trials owing to the technical expertise and experience needed in assessing damages. In Singh v. London Underground Ltd (1990), a litigant sought a jury trial on a case arising from the King's Cross fire but was refused owing to the technical nature of the case. In 1993, in Rantzen v Mirror Group Newspapers (1986) Ltd and others it was held that judges could substitute awards by juries in civil cases on appeal if they are deemed to be excessive. In 1998, fewer than 1% of civil trials in England and Wales were jury trials, and these were principally defamation cases.

Subsequently, the tort of breach of promise of marriage was abolished in England and Wales in 1971 by section 1, and the tort of seduction abolished by section 5 of the Law Reform (Miscellaneous Provisions) Act 1970.

Section 69 of the Senior Courts Act 1981, which replaced section 6 of the 1933 Act in respect of High Court trials, provides that trial shall be by jury on the application of a party where the court is satisfied that there is in issue:

- a claim of fraud against the party; or
- a claim in respect of libel, slander, malicious prosecution or false imprisonment

unless the court is of the opinion that the trial requires any prolonged examination of documents or accounts or any scientific or local investigation which cannot conveniently be made with a jury.

Libel and slander were removed from section 69 of the Senior Courts Act 1981 by section 11 of the Defamation Act 2013, meaning that defamation claims made on or after 1 January 2014 are heard without a jury unless the judge orders otherwise.

As such, as of 2021, only fraud, malicious prosecution, and false imprisonment still carry the automatic right of a jury trial.

== Number of jurors ==
Number of jurors in England and Wales
Court	At start of trial	Minimum number remaining	Majorities allowed	Source
High Court	12	9	With 12 jurors: 11-1, 10-2; With 11 jurors: 10-1; With 10 jurors: 9-1; With 9 jurors: the verdict must be unanimous.	Juries Act 1974, s.17
Crown Court	12	9	With 12 jurors: 11-1, 10-2; With 11 jurors: 10-1; With 10 jurors: 9-1; With 9 jurors: the verdict must be unanimous.	Juries Act 1974, s.17
County Court	8	7	With 8 jurors: 7-1; With 7 jurors: the verdict must be unanimous.	County Courts Act 1984, s.66; Juries Act 1974, s.17(2)
Coroner's Court	Between 7 and 11	—N/a	Minority no more than 2	Coroners Act 1988, s.8(2)(a), s.12

Since 1925 a jury has been able to continue hearing a case after a member has died or been discharged. Now the trial can continue so long as the minimum number of jurors remain. During the Second World War, the Administration of Justice (Emergency Provisions) Act 1939 authorised trials with only 7 jurors, except for treason or murder.

== Eligibility for jury service ==
A jury panel is summoned from those who meet all of the following criteria:

- British, Irish, Commonwealth and European Union citizens on the parliamentary or local government Electoral Register;
- aged 18 to 75 (although people aged over 70 can ask to be excused from serving);
- ordinarily resident in the UK, Channel Islands or the Isle of Man for any period of at least 5 years since the age of 13; and
- not disqualified for whatever reason.

Those who are liable to be detained under the Mental Health Act 1983 or who lack mental capacity are disqualified.

Persons currently on bail are disqualified. Persons are disqualified for life if they have been sentenced to:

- A life sentence;
- Detention for public protection;
- An extended sentence; or
- Imprisonment or detention for 5 years or more.

Persons are disqualified for 10 years after:

- Sentence, or suspended sentence of imprisonment or detention (less than 5 years); or
- Community punishments or treatment orders.

Persons "not capable of acting effectively as a juror" may be discharged by the judge.

People are excused from jury service if:

- they are currently a resident in a hospital or other similar institution, due to attend a hospital appointment or operation or recovering from an operation;
- they regularly visit a medical practitioner for treatment;
- they are in guardianship under section 7 of the Mental Health Act 1983;
- a judge has decided they are not capable of managing and administering property or affairs because of mental disorder/mental health problem;
- other medical reasons preclude their service. Medical certificates are only required if the Jury Central Summoning Bureau asks for one;
- they have been on jury service in the past two years (except coroner's juries)
- In exceptional circumstances, where an individual has been given the right of excusal from jury service for a period of time that has not yet ended. For example, the judge presiding over the Harold Shipman murder trial gave jurors the right (but not the obligation) to be excused from serving again for life. Individuals need to show the Jury Central Summoning Bureau evidence of this.
- they are aged over 70, and feel they could not carry out their jury duties.
- they are a full-time member of His Majesty's naval, military or air forces and their commanding officer certifies that their absence would prejudice the efficiency of the service.

England and Wales used to have additional rights of exemption for professionals including doctors, pharmacists, judges, barristers, solicitors, police officers, MPs, peers, and members of the clergy, but these rights were removed by the Criminal Justice Act 2003, although in the separate legal jurisdictions of Scotland and Northern Ireland, most of these rights remain exercisable.

There is no other category under which any person has the right to be excused from jury service. Anyone may, however, apply for a deferral of their jury duty upon receiving a summons (such as if, for example, they had already booked a holiday that coincided with the jury summons date). They must specify an alternative date within 1 year of their original summons when they would prefer to serve, and this will usually be granted. A deferral is not guaranteed, and if granted can only be used once.

== Empanelling and challenging jurors ==
Jurors are called by a written summons from the lord chancellor, despite the recent reform of that office, executed in practice by a local court officer. A panel of jurors is summoned, having regard to the convenience of the jurors though there are no absolute geographical constraints. There are facilities for the parties to inspect the panel and for individual members to be examined by the judge if there are doubts about their fitness to serve because of lack of proficiency in English or because of physical disability, for example deafness.

If there are not enough jurors on the panel then any person in the vicinity of the court can be summoned to make up the numbers, a process known as "praying a tales". Jurors so summoned are called talesmen. This rare procedure was used at Salisbury Crown Court in June 2016 after the judge noticed that he was three jurors short, leaving the court clerk and usher to look for people to join the jury. Two people declined to take up the jury service, but eventually "the judge's strategy paid off and the trial was able to go ahead after one passer-by was recruited from the street and two other jurors were transferred from Winchester." However, talesmen can be used only to fill a few vacant spots on a jury: as per R v Solomon (1958 1 Q.B.203), a jury composed solely of talesman is not a jury at all.

A jury in waiting, of twenty or more jurors is selected from the panel by the clerk of the court.

The clerk then calls the name of 12 of them at random, usually by drawing from a shuffled pack of cards with the names written on them. As each name is called, the juror steps into the jury box. Once the jury box is populated with 12 jurors, the clerk says to the defendant:

[John Smith], the names that you are about to hear called are the names of the jurors who are to try you. If therefore you wish to object to them or to any of them, you must do so as they come to the book to be sworn, and before they are sworn, and your objection will be heard.

The clerk then calls each juror individually to either affirm or to take the oath, reading from a printed card whilst, if taking an oath, holding a holy book in his right hand (New Testament for those Christians who will swear an oath; Old Testament for Jews; or Qur'an for Muslims). Some Christians (notably Quakers, Moravians and Jehovah's Witnesses) will not take an oath because they believe it is prohibited by Matthew 5:33-37 and James 5:12. The right of Quakers and Moravians to affirm, rather than swear, when joining a jury was introduced under the Quakers and Moravians Act 1833, and later extended to those who were formerly Quakers or formerly Moravians under the Quakers and Moravians Act 1838. Since then the right to affirm has been extended to anyone who chooses to do so, and no reason for choosing to affirm has to be given. The option to affirm is now commonly used by Quakers, Moravians, Jehovah's Witnesses, and some other Christians as well as by atheists and agnostics. Under the Oaths Act 1978, all affirmations are given in the format "I, do solemnly, sincerely and truly declare and affirm..."

The wording of oaths have changed over the years with growing input and inclusion of minority faith communities, including an update to the Sikh oath to remove the recommendation to swear by Waheguru, the removal of the Buddhist oath 'in the presence of Buddha', and the addition of a pagan oath.

Religion	Text of oath/affirmation	Scripture
Some Christians and Jews	I swear by almighty God that I will faithfully try the defendant and give a true verdict according to the evidence.	New Testament (for Christians who choose to take an oath); Old Testament (Tanakh) (for Jews)
Some Muslims	I swear by Allah that I will faithfully try the defendant and give a true verdict according to the evidence.	The Qur'an
Some Sikhs	I swear according to the Sunder Gutka (or by Almighty God) that the evidence I shall give shall be the truth, the whole truth and nothing but the truth.	Sunder Gutka
Some Hindus	I swear on the Gita I will faithfully try the defendant and give a true verdict according to the evidence.	Gita
Some Pagans	I swear, by all that I hold sacred, that I will faithfully try the defendant and give a true verdict according to the evidence.	None
Anyone who chooses to affirm rather than swear, including atheists, agnostics, and Christians who do not swear oaths, such as Quakers, Moravians, and Jehovah's Witnesses	I solemnly, sincerely and truly declare and affirm that I will faithfully try the defendant and give a true verdict according to the evidence.	None

Under some circumstances a juror can be challenged, and may not serve. This must be done before the oath is taken, and on limited grounds.

=== Peremptory challenges ===
Peremptory challenges, or challenges without cause, allowing the defence to prevent a certain number of jurors from serving without giving any reason, were formerly allowed in English courts and are still allowed in some other jurisdictions. At one time, the defence was allowed 25 such challenges, but this was reduced to 12 in 1925, to 7 in 1948 and 3 in 1977 before total abolition in 1988.

=== Stand by ===
The prosecution and judge, but not the defence, have the right to prevent a juror from serving by asking them to "stand by". However, prosecutors are instructed to invoke this right sparingly as the quality of the jury is primarily the responsibility of the court officer. The right should only be invoked in cases of national security or terrorism, in which case the personal authority of the Attorney General is needed, or where a juror is "obviously unsuitable", and the defence agree.

=== Challenge for cause ===
Either prosecution or defence can "challenge for cause" as many individual jurors as they wish on the grounds that the juror is:

- Ineligible or disqualified; or
- Reasonably suspected of being biased.

These are the modern versions of the ancient challenges of propter honoris respectum, propter defectum and propter affectum. Challenges have been successful where a juror was employed by or related to a party, had enjoyed entertainment at a party's home, or where they had already expressed an opinion on the case or shown hostility to the accused. During the 1969 trial of the notorious gangsters, the Kray twins, the trial judge was prepared to exclude any juror who had read some of the current lurid newspaper reporting. However, in a trial arising from the conduct of a picket in the bitterly contested UK miners' strike (1984–1985), a miner who had worked throughout the conflict was held to be fit to serve.

=== Challenge to the array ===
It is possible to challenge the whole jury panel on the grounds that the court official who selected them was biased but such a challenge is "virtually unknown in modern times."

=== Jury vetting ===
Checking the criminal records of the jury panel by the police is only permitted on the authority of the Director of Public Prosecutions, and only if:

- It appears that a juror is disqualified, or an attempt has been made to introduce a disqualified juror;
- There is a belief of attempted interference with a jury in a previous aborted trial; or
- The nature of case entails a special effort to avoid disqualified jurors.

Checks beyond criminal records may only be made if authorised by the Attorney General and there are adequate grounds for a prosecution request to stand by.

== Discharge of jurors ==
=== Individual jurors ===
During a trial, an individual juror can be discharged and the trial can continue so long as the minimum number of jurors remain. Discharge is at the discretion of the judge and should be exercised in cases of "evident necessity".

The test was given in Porter v Magill as "Would a fair-minded and informed observer conclude that there was a real possibility, or real danger (the two being the same) that the tribunal was biased?"

=== Whole jury ===
Where misconduct cannot be dealt with by discharge of an individual juror, or in the case of jury tampering, or where the jury cannot reach a verdict, the entire jury can be discharged. Inadvertent inadmissible evidence that may prejudice the jury will not inevitably lead to discharge of the jury; the matter lies at the discretion of the judge, who may conclude that the rights of the defendant can be adequately protected by his directing the jury to ignore such evidence.

== Conduct of jury ==
Once the jury is sworn, it is customary, but not mandatory, for the clerk to say:

To this indictment he has pleaded not guilty and it is your charge to say, having heard the evidence, whether he be guilty or not.

=== Jury's right to stop the trial ===
Once all the prosecution evidence has been given, the jury may at any time, of its own motion, decide to acquit the defendant. Few juries will realise that they have this power unless advised by the judge. Active judicial intervention beyond a mere statement of this right is disapproved of by the Court of Appeal, and, as of 2007, is rarely exercised.

=== Retirement of the jury ===
After the judge has summed up the case, the court usher swears to keep the jury in some "private and convenient place", to prevent them from speaking to anyone else and not to speak to them himself "except it be to ask them if they are agreed upon their verdict." The usher then becomes the jury bailiff, and stations himself outside the jury room during the deliberations. The jury may send a note to the judge to ask a question of law or for the judge to read to them a transcript of some of the evidence. It is a contempt of court for a juror to disclose, or for anyone else (including the press) to enquire into, the nature of the jury's deliberations. This is an effective bar on jury research in England and Wales, and on appeals on the basis of the jury's method of reaching its decision.

=== Verdict ===
The jury may return a verdict of:

- Not guilty;
- Guilty;
- Not guilty but guilty of a similar, but less serious, offence. For example, they can find someone not guilty of murder but guilty of manslaughter. However, this verdict cannot be given in cases of high treason;
- Exceptionally, a special verdict.

== Bibliography ==
=== Historical ===
- Arnold, M. S. (1974). "Law and fact in the medieval jury trial". American Journal of Legal History. 18 (4): 267–280. doi:10.2307/845166. JSTOR 845166.
- Arnold, M. S. (1985). "The control of the jury". Selden Society. 100: x–xxxi.
- Baker, J. H. (2002). An Introduction to English Legal History (4th ed.). London: Butterworths. pp. 72–76. ISBN 978-0-406-93053-8.
- Cairns, J.; Macleod, G., eds. (2002). The Dearest Birth Right of the People of England: The Jury in the History of the Common Law. London: Hart Publishing. ISBN 978-1-84113-325-6.
- Hanly, C. (2005). "The decline of civil jury trial in nineteenth-century England". Journal of Legal History. 26 (3): 253–278. doi:10.1080/01440360500347525. S2CID 144988033.
- Lobban, M. (2002) "The strange life of the English civil jury, 1837-1914", in Cairns and McLeod (2002), p.173
- Lloyd-Bostock, S.; Thomas, C. (1999). "Decline of the "little parliament": juries and jury reform in England and Wales". Law and Contemporary Problems. 62 (2): 7. doi:10.2307/1192251. JSTOR 1192251. Archived from the original on 2 July 2007.
- Mitnick, J. M. (1988). "From neighbor-witness to judge of proofs: the transformation of the English civil juror". American Journal of Legal History. 32 (3): 201–235. doi:10.2307/845380. JSTOR 845380.
- Oldham, J. (1983). "The origins of the special jury". University of Chicago Law Review. 50 (1): 137–221. doi:10.2307/1599384. JSTOR 1599384. S2CID 55413059.
- Oldham, J. (1987). "Special juries in England: 19th century usage and reform". Journal of Legal History. 8 (2): 148–166. doi:10.1080/01440368708530895.
- Turner, R. V. (1968). "The origins of the medieval English jury". Journal of British Studies. 7 (2): (pt ii) 1–10. doi:10.1086/385549. S2CID 146678716.
- Van Caenegem; R. C. (1988). The Birth of the English Common Law (2nd ed.). London: Cambridge University Press. pp. 62–84. ISBN 978-0-521-35682-4.
- Van Caenegem (1999). "The origins of the jury: forum". Law and History Review. 17: 535–607.

=== Modern practice ===
- Elliott, C.; Quinn, F. (1998). English Legal System (8th ed.). London: Longman. ISBN 978-1-4058-4733-9.
- Lord Mackay of Clashfern (ed.) (2006) Halsbury's Laws of England, Vol.11(3) 4th ed. 2006 reissue, "Criminal Law, Evidence and Procedure", 19(5) 'Trial of indictments: The jury'
- Richardson, P.J., ed. (2006). Archbold: Criminal Pleading, Evidence and Practice. London: Sweet & Maxwell. ISBN 978-0-421-90920-5., 4-199 - 4-265, 4-417 - 4-469
- Sprack, J (2006). A Practical Approach to Criminal Procedure (11th ed.). Oxford: Oxford University Press. ISBN 978-0-19-929830-3.
