= List of ordinances of the Legislative Council of Western Australia from 1844 =

This is a list of acts of the Legislative Council of Western Australia for the year 1844.

== 1844 ==
Short title, or popular name	Citation	Royal assent
Long title
	7 Vict. No. 11	21 May 1844
An Act to amend an Act intituled 'An Act to regulate the Apprenticeship and. otherwise to provide for the Guardianship and Control of a certain class of Juvenile Immigrants.' (Note: 6 Vict. No. 8)
	7 Vict. No. 12	30 May 1844
An Act to regulate summary proceedings before Justices of the Peace.
Imperial Acts Adopting Act 1844	7 Vict. No. 13	30 May 1844
An Act for adopting certain Acts of Parliament passed in the Third and Fourth, (Note: Quakers and Moravians Act 1833 (3 & 4 Will. 4. c. 49 (Imp))) the Fourth and Fifth, (Note: Trust Property Escheat Act 1834 (4 & 5 Will. 4. c. 23 (Imp))) (Note: Hanging in Chains Act 1834 (4 & 5 Will. 4. c. 26 (Imp))) the Fifth and Sixth, (Note: Gaming Act 1835 (5 & 6 Will. 4. c. 41 (Imp))) (Note: Marriage Act 1835 (5 & 6 Will. 4. c. 54 (Imp))) (Note: Capital Punishment Abolition Act 1835 (5 & 6 Will. 4. c. 81 (Imp))) and the Sixth and Seventh (Note: Capital Punishment Abolition Act 1836 (6 & 7 Will. 4. c. 4 (Imp))) (Note: Executions for Murder Act 1836 (6 & 7 Will. 4. c. 30 (Imp))) (Note: Bills of Exchange Act 1836 (6 & 7 Will. 4. c. 58 (Imp))) (Note: Previous Conviction Act 1836 (6 & 7 Will. 4. c. 111 (Imp))) (Note: Trials for Felony Act 1836 (6 & 7 Will. 4. c. 114 (Imp))) years of the reign of His late Majesty King William the Fourth; and also certain Acts of Parliament passed in the First and Second, (Note: Estates Vest in Heirs, etc., of Mortgages Act 1838 (1 & 2 Vict. c. 69 (Imp))) (Note: Small Tenements Recovery Act 1838 (1 & 2 Vict. c. 74 (Imp))) (Note: Quakers and Moravians Act 1838 (1 & 2 Vict. c. 77 (Imp))) (Note: Oaths Act 1838 (1 & 2 Vict. c. 105 (Imp))) the Second and Third, (Note: Custody of Infants Act 1839 (2 & 3 Vict. c. 54 (Imp))) (Note: Debts Recovery Act 1839 (2 & 3 Vict. c. 60 (Imp))) and the Fifth and Sixth (Note: Factors Act 1842 (5 & 6 Vict. c. 39 (Imp))) (Note: Perpetuation of Testimony Act 1842 (5 & 6 Vict. c. 69 (Imp))) years of the reign of Her present Majesty Queen Victoria respectively; and applying the same in the Administration of Justice in Western Australia in like manner as the other Laws of England are applied therein.
	7 Vict. No. 14	6 June 1844
An Act to regulate the temporary occupation of Crown Lands in the Colony of Western Australia.
	7 Vict. No. 15	13 June 1844
An Act to prevent the spreading of the Infectious Disease called the Scab in Sheep in the colony of Western Australia.
	7 Vict. No. 16	13 June 1844
An Act to repeal so much of an Act passed in the fourth year of the reign of Her present Majesty Queen Victoria, intituled 'An Act to promote the Building of Churches and Chapels, and to contribute towards the Maintenance of Ministers of Religion in Western Australia,' (Note: 4 Vict. No. 6) as authorises the issue of money from the Colonial Treasury for such purposes.
	8 Vict. No. 1	27 June 1844
An Act to remove doubts as to the liability of certain parties to pay for landing Goods under special permission at other places than the appointed landing places.
	8 Vict. No. 2	27 June 1844
An Act to enable certain Ratepayers in Towns to vote and act as Trustees of such Towns, and to qualify the right of Town Trustees to vote.
	8 Vict. No. 3	11 July 1844
An Act for applying certain Sums arising from the Revenue receivable in the Colony of Western Australia to the service thereof, for the Financial Year commencing First of April, One thousand eight hundred and forty-five. (Repealed by Statute Law Revision Act 1964 (13 Eliz. II. No. 61))
	8 Vict. No. 4	25 July 1844
An Act to authorise the Keepers of Boarding Houses to sell Spirituous and Fermented Liquors by retail under special regulations.
	8 Vict. No. 5	25 July 1844
An Act to repeal the Duties on certain Goods imported into Western Australia, and to impose other Duties in lieu thereof. (Repealed by 9 Vict. No. 7)
	8 Vict. No. 6	1 August 1844
An Act to prevent the enticing away the Girls of the Aboriginal Race from School, or from any Service in which they are employed.
	8 Vict. No. 7	1 August 1844
An Act to authorise a demand of payment for Licenses to keep Private Warehouses for the securing of Goods subject to Duty.
Street Alignment Act 1844	8 Vict. No. 8	22 August 1844
An Act to provide for the Alignment of Streets in the several Towns in the Colony of Western Australia.
Town Allotments (Boundaries) Act 1844	8 Vict. No. 9	22 August 1844
An Act for the adjustment of Divisional Boundaries of Allotments in Towns; and to prevent Litigation from undesigned encroachments on adjoining Allotments.
	8 Vict. No. 10	22 August 1844
An Act to extend the remedies of Creditors against Debtors about to leave the Colony.

== Sources ==
- "legislation.wa.gov.au".
