= Duchy of Lancaster Act 1808 =

Act of the Parliament of the United Kingdom

Duchy of Lancaster Act 1808 (Note: The citation of this act by this short title was authorised by section 3 of, and schedule 3 to, the Statute Law (Repeals) Act 1977. Due to the repeal of those provisions, it is now authorised by section 19(2) of the Interpretation Act 1978.)
- Act of Parliament
- Parliament of the United Kingdom
- Long title: An Act to improve the Land Revenue of the Crown in England, and also of His Majesty’s Duchy of Lancaster.
- Citation: 48 Geo. 3. c. 73
- Territorial extent: United Kingdom

Dates
- Royal assent: 18 June 1808
- Commencement: 18 June 1808 (Note: The Acts of Parliament (Commencement) Act 1793.)

Other legislation
- Amended by: Crown Lands Act 1829; Statute Law (Repeals) Act 1977; Duchy of Lancaster Act 1988; Statute Law (Repeals) Act 1989

Status: Amended

Text of statute as originally enacted

Revised text of statute as amended

Text of the Duchy of Lancaster Act 1808 as in force today (including any amendments) within the United Kingdom, from legislation.gov.uk.

The Duchy of Lancaster Act 1808 (48 Geo. 3. c. 73) is an act of the Parliament of the United Kingdom.

== Subsequent developments ==
The whole act was repealed, excepting so far as any powers, provisions, matters or things related to or affected the Duchy of Lancaster or any of the hereditaments, possessions or property within the ordering and survey of the Duchy of Lancaster, by section 1 of the Crown Lands Act 1829 (10 Geo. 4. c. 50).

Sections 1 and 2 and 4 and 5 and 7 and 20 were repealed by section 1(4) of, and the schedule to, the Duchy of Lancaster Act 1988, which came into force on 3 May 1988.

The following enactments were repealed by section 1(1) of, and group 3 part VI of schedule 1 to, the Statute Law (Repeals) Act 1989, which came into force on 16 November 1989.

- Section 10 from “and of ground” to “county or district” where secondly occurring.
- In section 12, the words “enfranchisements of copyholds and” and “respectively”.
- In section 17, the words “enfranchisements of copyholds, and”.
- In section 18, the words “for the enfranchisement of any copyhold or”.
- Section 31.
