= Duchy of Lancaster Act 1817 =

Act of the Parliament of the United Kingdom

Duchy of Lancaster Act 1817 (Note: The citation of this act by this short title was authorised by section 3 of, and schedule 3 to, the Statute Law (Repeals) Act 1977. Due to the repeal of those provisions, it is now authorised by section 19(2) of the Interpretation Act 1978.)
- Act of Parliament
- Parliament of the United Kingdom
- Long title: An Act for ratifying Articles of Agreement entered into by the Right Honourable Henry Hall Viscount Gage, and the Commissioners of His Majesty’s Woods, Forests, and Land Revenues; and for the better Management and Improvement of the Land Revenues of the Crown.
- Citation: 57 Geo. 3. c. 97
- Territorial extent: United Kingdom

Dates
- Royal assent: 10 July 1817
- Commencement: 10 July 1817 (Note: The Acts of Parliament (Commencement) Act 1793.)
Other legislation
Amended by	Crown Lands Act 1820; Crown Lands Act 1829

Status: Amended

Text of statute as originally enacted

Revised text of statute as amended

Text of the Duchy of Lancaster Act 1817 as in force today (including any amendments) within the United Kingdom, from legislation.gov.uk.

The Duchy of Lancaster Act 1817 (57 Geo. 3. c. 97) is an act of the Parliament of the United Kingdom.

== Subsequent developments ==
The whole act was repealed, excepting so far as any powers, provisions, matters or things related to or affected the Duchy of Lancaster or any of the hereditaments, possessions or property within the ordering and survey of the Duchy of Lancaster, by section 1 of the Crown Lands Act 1829 (10 Geo. 4. c 50).
