= Statute Law (Repeals) Act 1977 =

Act of the Parliament of the United Kingdom

Statute Law (Repeals) Act 1977 (Note: Section 5.)
- Act of Parliament
- Parliament of the United Kingdom
- Long title: An Act to promote the reform of the statute law by the repeal, in accordance with recommendations of the Law Commission and the Scottish Law Commission, of certain enactments which (except in so far as their effect is preserved) are no longer of practical utility; and to facilitate the citation of statutes.
- Citation: 1977 c. 18
- Introduced by: Lord Elwyn-Jones LC (Lords)
- Territorial extent: United Kingdom; Isle of Man (Note: Section 4(3). The Statute Law Repeals (Isle of Man) Order 1984 (SI 1984/1692).); Hong Kong (repeal of the Chinese Passengers Act 1855 (18 & 19 Vict. c. 104)); (Note: Section 4.)

Dates
- Royal assent: 16 June 1977
- Commencement: 16 June 1977 (Note: The Acts of Parliament (Commencement) Act 1793.)

Other legislation
- Amends: Reserve and Auxiliary Forces (Protection of Civil Interests) Act 1951; City of London (Guild Churches) Act 1952; Highways Act 1959; Army Reserve Act 1962; Criminal Justice (Scotland) Act 1963; See § Repealed enactments
- Repeals/revokes: See § Repealed enactments
- Amended by: Reserve Forces Act 1980; Statute Law (Repeals) Act 1995; Statute Law (Repeals) Act 1998
- Relates to: See Statute Law (Repeals) Act

Status: Amended

Text of statute as originally enacted

The Statute Law (Repeals) Act 1977 (c. 18) is an act of the Parliament of the United Kingdom.

As of 2026 the act remains partly in force in the United Kingdom.

== Background ==
The act implemented recommendations contained in the eighth report on statute law revision, by the Law Commission and the Scottish Law Commission.

== Provisions ==
The power conferred by section 4(3) of the act was exercised by the Statute Law Repeals (Isle of Man) Order 1984 (SI 1984/1692).

=== Repealed enactments ===
Section 1(1) of the act repealed 434 enactments, listed in parts I to XIX of schedule 1 to the act.

==== Part I: Armed Forces ====
Part I — Armed Forces
Citation	Short title	Extent of repeal
22 & 23 Vict. c. 40	Royal Naval Reserve (Volunteer) Act 1859	In section 2, the words from " The foregoing provisions " onwards. In section 3, the words from " Provided also " onwards. In section 13, the proviso.
11 & 12 Geo. 6. c. 21	Army and Air Force (Women's Service) Act 1948	Section 4.
11 & 12 Geo. 6. c. 64	National Service Act 1948	Part I. In section 55, the words from " or under any Order " to " this Act,". Section 56(a) and (c) to (e). Section 61. Schedules 1 to 4.
12, 13 & 14 Geo. 6. c. 6	National Service (Amendment) Act 1948	The whole act except section 1(2), so far as it amends section 40 of the National Service Act 1948, and section 6(1).
12, 13 & 14 Geo. 6. c. 96	Auxiliary and Reserve Forces Act 1949	In section 10(1), the words " and the Royal Naval Special Reserve ". Section 11(4)(c). Section 16. In section 17, subsection (2); and in subsection (3), the definitions of " Act of 1907 " and " competent military authority ". Schedule 1.
14 Geo. 6. c. 30	National Service Act 1950	The whole act.
14 Geo. 6. c. 32	Army Reserve Act 1950	Section 1(2)(b). Section 2. In section 4, in the proviso to subsection (1), the words " not being a militiaman "; subsections (2) to (4); and in subsection (5), the words from " or, if " onwards. In section 6(1)(a), the words " or is a member thereof by virtue of the Navy, Army and Air Force Reserves Act 1954". In section 8(3), the proviso. Section 14(4)(b) and (6). In section 28(1), the definitions of " the Act of 1948 " and " militiaman ". Section 29(1), (5), (6), (8) and (9). Schedule 3.
14 Geo. 6. c. 33	Air Force Reserve Act 1950	Sections 1(b), 2(6) and 4(4). In section 6(1)(a), the words " or is a member thereof by virtue of the Navy, Army and Air Force Reserves Act 1954". Section 14(4)(b) and (6). In section 27(1), the definition of " the Act of 1948 ". Section 28. Section 30(1), (3) and (6). Schedule 3.
14 & 15 Geo. 6. c. 10	Reinstatement in Civil Employment Act 1950	The following provisions, including those provisions as applied by any other enactment:— Section 1(c) and (d). Sections 2, 3 and 4. In section 5(1), the words " or such a further period of whole-time service as is mentioned in subsection (3) of section three of this Act ". In section 5(2), the words " or paragraph (c) " where they occur in paragraph (i) and the words " or any person who has accepted a commission in the circumstances mentioned in subsection (2) of section three of this Act ". Section 7. In section 8(1), the definitions of " former employer " and " Reinstatement Committee "; in the definition of " reserve or auxiliary force ", the words " the royal naval special reserve " and " the royal naval volunteer reserve "; and in the definition of " short-service commission ", the words from " other than " onwards.
14 & 15 Geo. 6. c. 65	Reserve and Auxiliary Forces (Protection of Civil Interests) Act 1951	In section 52(1), paragraph (a); and in paragraph (b), the words from the beginning to " attached, or". In section 60(1), in paragraph (a), the words from " (except " onwards; and paragraph (b). In section 60(2), the words from " and any like certificate " to " preceding subsection,". In section 60(3), the words " or the Minister of Labour and National Service ". In section 60(6), the words " and the Minister of Labour and National Service " and the word " respectively ". In section 64(1), the definition of " compulsory national service "; in the definition of " service ", the words from " and includes also " onwards; and in the definition of " short period of training ", the words from " of a description specified in paragraph 2 " to " 6 thereof, or ". Section 64(3). In Schedule 1, in paragraph 1, sub-paragraphs (iii), (iv), (vi), (vii) and (viii); and paragraphs 2, 3, 5 and 6.
1 & 2 Eliz. 2. c. 50	Auxiliary Forces Act 1953	In section 11(5), in paragraph (a), the words from " (other than " to " 1948) "; and in paragraphs (b) and (c), the words from " (other than " to " aforesaid) ". In section 12(1), the words " and of the National Service Act 1948 ". In section 14, in subsection (1), the words from " Subject to " to " subsection "; and subsection (2). In section 17, in subsection (1), the words " save as hereinafter provided "; and subsection (3). Sections 21 and 26(5). In section 28, paragraph (b) and the proviso. In section 31(6), the proviso. In section 39(3), the proviso. Section 46(4).
3 & 4 Eliz. 2. c. 11	National Service Act 1955	The whole act.
3 & 4 Eliz. 2. c. 18	Army Act 1955	Sections 20 and 215(11). Schedule 2. In Schedule 7, paragraph 2(5).
3 & 4 Eliz. 2. c. 19	Air Force Act 1955	Sections 20 and 213(11). Schedule 2.
3 & 4 Eliz. 2. c. 20	Revision of the Army and Air Force Acts (Transitional Provisions) Act 1955	In Schedule 2, paragraphs 10 and 15. In Schedule 3, paragraph 2.
5 & 6 Eliz. 2. c. 53	Naval Discipline Act 1957	Section 137(3). Schedule 7.
7 & 8 Eliz. 2. c. 72	Mental Health Act 1959	In Schedule 7, the entry relating to the National Service Act 1948.
8 & 9 Eliz. 2. c. 61	Mental Health (Scotland) Act 1960	In Schedule 4, the entry relating to the National Service Act 1948.
10 & 11 Eliz. 2. c. 10	Army Reserve Act 1962	In section 3(1), the words from " not being " to " 1948 ".
1966 c. 30	Reserve Forces Act 1966	Section 5(5)(f). Section 6(3)(a)(i). In section 16(3), the words " and is not serving for a term of part-time service within the meaning of the National Service Act 1948 ".
1971 c. 3	Guardianship of Minors Act 1971	Section 20(4)(b). In Schedule 1, the entries relating to the Army Act 1955 and the Air Force Act 1955.
1971 c. 62	Tribunals and Inquiries Act 1971	Section 9(b).
1973 c. 32	National Health Service Reorganisation Act 1973	In Schedule 4, paragraph 48.

==== Part II: Civil List ====
Part II — Civil List
Citation	Short title	Extent of repeal
22 Geo. 3. c. 82	Civil List and Secret Service Money Act 1782	Sections 24 to 29.
56 Geo. 3. c. 46	Civil List Audit Act 1816	Section 11.
10 Edw. 7 & 1 Geo. 5. c. 28	Civil List Act 1910	The whole act.
26 Geo. 5 & 1 Edw. 8. c. 15	Civil List Act 1936	Section 8(2).
1 Edw. 8 & 1 Geo. 6. c. 32	Civil List Act 1937	Section 4. In section 13, the words from " for the provision for " (where secondly occurring) to " the Duke of Gloucester ".
1972 c. 7	Civil List Act 1972	In section 2, subsection (2), and in subsection (9) the words " and 4(2) ". In section 6(1)(b), the words " and 4(2) ".

==== Part III: Coroners ====
Part III — Coroners
Citation	Short title	Extent of repeal
51 Geo. 3. c. 36	Cinque Ports Act 1811	The whole act.
11 & 12 Geo. 5. c. 30	Coroners Act 1921	The whole act.
2 & 3 Eliz. 2. c. 31	Coroners Act 1954	Section 1(4).
1963 c. 33	London Government Act 1963	Section 78(2)(a) and (4).
1972 c. 70	Local Government Act 1972	Section 220(4).

==== Part IV: Criminal Justice ====
Part IV — Criminal Justice
Citation	Short title	Description	Extent of repeal
19 Hen. 7. c. 28	Power of the King to Reverse Attainders Act 1503	(Power to reverse attainders).	The whole act.
14 & 15 Hen. 8. c. 21 (Note: This is the citation in The Statutes of the Realm.)	Act of Auctorite 1523	Thacte of Auctorite.	The whole act.
25 Hen. 8. c. 32	Pardon of Richard Southwell and others Act 1533	An Acte concernyng the pardon of Richard Southwell and others.	The whole act.
7 Anne c. 21	Treason Act 1708	Treason Act 1708.	In section 5, the words " or attainted ", wherever occurring. Section 8.
22 Geo. 2. c. 48	Treason Outlawries (Scotland) Act 1748	Treason Outlawries (Scotland) Act 1748.	The whole act.
11 Geo. 4 & 1 Will. 4. c. 37	Criminal Law (Scotland) Act 1830	Criminal Law (Scotland) Act 1830.	Section 10. In section 11, the words from the beginning to " this Act, and ".
20 & 21 Vict. c. 43	Summary Jurisdiction Act 1857	Summary Jurisdiction Act 1857.	Section 1.
31 & 32 Vict. c. 95	Justiciary Court (Scotland) Act 1868	Justiciary Court (Scotland) Act 1868.	In section 11, the words from the beginning to " 1848 ". Schedule B.
8 Edw. 7. c. 65	Summary Jurisdiction (Scotland) Act 1908	Summary Jurisdiction (Scotland) Act 1908.	The whole act.
4 & 5 Geo. 5. c. 58	Criminal Justice Administration Act 1914	Criminal Justice Administration Act 1914.	Section 41.
16 & 17 Geo. 5. c. 15	Criminal Appeal (Scotland) Act 1926	Criminal Appeal (Scotland) Act 1926.	In section 4(2), the words " or corporal punishment ". Section 19(2).
17 & 18 Geo. 5. c. 26	Criminal Appeal (Scotland) Act 1927	Criminal Appeal (Scotland) Act 1927.	The whole act.
11 & 12 Geo. 6. c. 58	Criminal Justice Act 1948	Criminal Justice Act 1948.	Sections 2 and 30. Section 66 as it applies to Scotland. Sections 70(1) and 73. Section 81, except the words " this Act shall not extend to Scotland ". Section 82, except the words " this Act shall not extend to Northern Ireland ". Section 83(2) and (3). In Schedule 9, the entries relating to the Stipendiary Magistrates Act 1858, the Clergy Discipline Act 1892, the Children and Young Persons Act 1938 and the National Service Act 1947. Schedule 10.
12, 13 & 14 Geo. 6. c. 94	Criminal Justice (Scotland) Act 1949	Criminal Justice (Scotland) Act 1949.	Sections 78(7) and 79(3). In Schedule 11, the entry relating to the National Service Act 1947. Schedule 12.
5 & 6 Eliz. 2. c. 11	Homicide Act 1957	Homicide Act 1957.	Section 16.
1963 c. 39	Criminal Justice (Scotland) Act 1963	Criminal Justice (Scotland) Act 1963.	In section 26(2), paragraph (a) and the words from " the section " to " 44, and ".
1967 c. 80	Criminal Justice Act 1967	Criminal Justice Act 1967.	In Schedule 3, in Part I, the entry relating to section 11 of the London Hackney Carriage Act 1853.
1971 c. 70	Hijacking Act 1971	Hijacking Act 1971.	Section 5(1A).
1972 c. 71	Criminal Justice Act 1972	Criminal Justice Act 1972.	In Schedule 5, the entry relating to the Reserve and Auxiliary Forces (Training) Act 1951.
1973 c. 47	Protection of Aircraft Act 1973	Protection of Aircraft Act 1973.	In section 6, in subsection (2) the words from " (1A) " to " such offence "; the words from " and shall be deemed " onwards; and subsection (3).
Acts of Attainder or Restitution
7 Hen. 7. c. 16	Restitution of Earl of Surrey Act 1491	(Restitution of Earl of Surrey).	The whole act.
11 Hen. 7. c. 44	Restitution of Earl of Kildare Act 1495	(Restitution of Earl of Kildare).	The whole act.
19 Hen. 7. c. 34	Attainder of Lord Audley and Others Act 1503	(Attainder of Lord Audley and others).	The whole act.
19 Hen. 7. c. 35	Restitution of Robert Brewce Act 1503	(Restitution of Robert Brewce).	The whole act.
19 Hen. 7. c. 37	Restitution of John Heron Act 1503	(Restitution of John Heron).	The whole act.
19 Hen. 7. c. 38	Restitution of Richard Berkley Act 1503	(Restitution of Richard Berkley).	The whole act.
19 Hen. 7. c. 39	Restitution of William Barley Act 1503	(Restitution of William Barley).	The whole act.
19 Hen. 7. c. 40	Restitution of John Harrington Act 1503	(Restitution of John Harrington).	The whole act.
1 Hen. 8. c. 19	Restitution of Robert Ratcliffe Act 1509	(Restitution of Robert Ratcliffe).	The whole act.
3 Hen. 8. c. 17	Restitution of Lord Audley and others Act 1511	(Restitution of Lord Audley and others).	The whole act.
3 Hen. 8. c. 19	Restitution of John Dudley Act 1511	(Restitution of John Dudley).	The whole act.
3 Hen. 8. c. 20	Restitution of Thomas Herte Act 1511	(Restitution of Thomas Herte).	The whole act.
3 Hen. 8. c. 21	Restitution of Elizabeth Martyn Act 1511	(Restitution of Elizabeth Martyn).	The whole act.
4 Hen. 8. c. 9	Restitution of Earl of Devon Act 1512	(Restitution of Earl of Devon).	The whole act.
4 Hen. 8. c. 14	Restitution of John and Thomas Wyndham Act 1512	(Restitution of John and Thomas Wyndham).	The whole act.
4 Hen. 8. c. 15	Restitution of Thomas Empson Act 1512	(Restitution of Thomas Empson).	The whole act.
4 Hen. 8. c. 16	Restitution of William Baskerville Act 1512	(Restitution of William Baskerville).	The whole act.
5 Hen. 8. c. 12	Restitution of the Countess of Salisbury (Margaret Pole) Act 1513	The Restitucion of the Countesse of Salisbury.	The whole act.
5 Hen. 8. c. 13	Restitution of Humphrey Stafford Act 1513	The Restitucion of Humfrey Stafford.	The whole act.
5 Hen. 8. c. 15	Restitution of John Audley Act 1513	The Restitucion of John Audeley.	The whole act.
6 Hen. 8. c. 21	Restitution of Edward Belnap Knight Act 1514	Restitucion of Edward Belknap Knight.	The whole act.
6 Hen. 8. c. 22	Restitution of John White Clerk Act 1514	Restitucion of John White Clerk.	The whole act.
14 & 15 Hen. 8. c. 20	Attainder of Edward late Duke of Buckingham Act 1523	Thacte of Atteynder of Edward late Duke of Buckingham.	The whole act.
14 & 15 Hen. 8. c. 23	Restitution of Henry Stafford Act 1523	An Acte for Henry Stafford and Ursula his Wyfe.	The whole act.
23 Hen. 8. c. 34	Attainder of Gruffyth and Hughes Act 1531	An Acte concernyng the Atteynder of Rychard ap Gruffyth & Wyllyam Hughes.	The whole act.
25 Hen. 8. c. 34	Attainder of John Wolff and others Act 1533	An Acte concernyng the attaynder of John Wolff his wyffe and others.	The whole act.
26 Hen. 8. c. 22	Attainder of the Bishop of Rochester and others Act 1534	An Acte concernyng the Attaynder of the Bysshop of Rochester and others.	The whole act.
26 Hen. 8. c. 23	Attainder of Sir Thomas More Act 1534	An Acte concernyng the Attaynder of Syr Thomas More Knyght.	The whole act.
26 Hen. 8. c. 25	Attainder of the Earl of Kildare Act 1534	An Acte concernyng the Attaynder of Thomas Fittzgerald Erle of Gildare.	The whole act.
27 Hen. 8. c. 59	Attainder of John Lewes Act 1535	An Acte concernyng the attaynder of John Lewes.	The whole act.
28 Hen. 8. c. 18	Attainder of the Earl of Kildare Act 1536	An Acte concernyng the Attaynder of Thomas Fittzgaralde and of his v. Uncles.	The whole act.
28 Hen. 8. c. 24	Attainder of Lord Thomas Howard Act 1536	An Acte concernyng the Attaynder of the Lord Thomas Howard.	The whole act.
28 Hen. 8. c. 52	Lands of Lord Rochford and other Persons Attainted Act 1536	An Acte for persons to enjoye their lands and to have avauntage in the Lawe wherin the Lord Rocheford, Norreys and others, were seased.	The whole act.
2 & 3 Edw. 6. c. 18	Attainder of Thomas Seymour Act 1548	An Acte for thatteyndor of Sir Thomas Seymour Knight Lorde Seymour of Sudleye, Highe Admyrall of Englande.	The whole act.
3 & 4 Edw. 6. c. 14	Restitution of Mary Seymour Act 1549	An Act of the Restitution of Mary Seymour dawghter to the Lorde Seymour late Admirall of Englond.	The whole act.
1 Mar. Sess. 2. c. 16	Attainder of Duke of Northumberland and others Act 1553	An Acte for the confirmation of thattaynder of John late Duke of Northumberlande and others.	The whole act.
13 Eliz. 1. c. 16	Attainders of Earl of Westmorland and others Act 1571	An Acte for the confirmation of Thattaynders of Charles Earle of Westmerlande Thomas Earle of Northumberland and others.	The whole act.
29 Eliz. 1. c. 1	Attainder of Lord Paget and others Act 1586	An Acte for the Confirmation of the Attaynders of Thomas late Lorde Pagett and others.	The whole act.
35 Eliz. 1. c. 5	Englefield Attainder Act 1592	An Acte confyrming the Quenes Title to the lands of Sir Frauncys Englefield.	The whole act.
3 Jas. 1. c. 2	Attainder of Guy Fawkes and Others Act 1605	An Acte for the Attaindors of divers Offendors in the late moste barbarous monstrous detestable and damnable Treasons.	The whole act.
12 Chas. 2. c. 7	Lord Ormond (Restoration of Lands, etc., in Ireland) Act 1660	An Acte for restoreing unto James Marquesse of Ormond all his Honours, Mannours, Land and Tenements in Ireland whereof he was in possession on the 23rd of October 1641 or at any time since.	The whole act.
8 & 9 Will. 3. c. 4	Attainder of Sir John Fenwick Act 1696	An Act to attaint Sir John Fenwick Baronett of High Treason.	The whole act.
8 & 9 Will. 3. c. 5	Attainder of Conspirators Act 1696	An Act to attaint such of the Persons concerned in the late horrid Conspiracy to assassinate His Majesties Royal Person who are fled from Justice unlesse they render themselves to Justice and for continuing several others of the said Conspirators in Custody.	The whole act.
1 Geo. 1. St. 2. c. 16	Attainder of Viscount Bolingbroke Act 1714	An Act for the Attainder of Henry Viscount Bolingbroke of High Treason, unless he shall render himself to Justice by a day certain therein mentioned.	The whole act.
1 Geo. 1. St. 2. c. 17	Attainder of Duke of Ormonde Act 1714	An Act for the Attainder of James Duke of Ormonde of High Treason, unless he shall render himself to Justice by a day certain therein mentioned.	The whole act.
1 Geo. 1. St. 2. c. 32	Attainder of Earl of Mar and others Act 1715	An Act to attaint John Earl of Mar, William Murray Esquire, commonly called Marquess of Tullibardine, James Earl of Linlithgow, and James Drummond Esquire, commonly called Lord Drummond, of High Treason.	The whole act.
1 Geo. 1. St. 2. c. 42	Attainder of Earl of Marischal and others Act 1715	An Act for the Attainder of George Earl of Marischal, William Earl of Seaforth, James Earl of Southesque, James Earl of Panmuir, and others, of High Treason, unless they shall render themselves to Justice by a day certain therein mentioned.	The whole act.
1 Geo. 1. St. 2. c. 53	Attainder of Thomas Forster and others Act 1715	An Act for the Attainder of Thomas Forster junior, Esquire, and William Mackintosh Esquire (commonly called Brigadier Macintosh) of High Treason.	The whole act.
9 Geo. 1. c. 15	Attainder of John Plunket Act 1722	An Act to inflict Pains and Penalties on John Plunket.	The whole act.
9 Geo. 1. c. 16	Attainder of George Kelley Act 1722	An Act to inflict Pains and Penalties on George Kelly alias Johnson.	The whole act.
9 Geo. 1. c. 17	Attainder of Bishop of Rochester Act 1722	An Act to inflict Pains and Penalties on Francis Lord Bishop of Rochester.	The whole act.
8 Geo. 2. c. 22	Late Earl of Seaforth Act 1734	An Act to enable William Mackenzie late Earl of Seafort to sue or maintain any action or suit, notwithstanding his Attainder, and to remove any disability in him by reason of his said Attainder, to take or inherit any real or personal estate that may or shall hereafter descend or come to him.	The whole act.
19 Geo. 2. c. 26	Attainder of Earl of Kellie and Others Act 1745	An Act to attaint Alexander Earl of Kellie [and others] of High Treason, if they shall not render themselves to one of His Majesty's Justices of the Peace, on or before the twelfth day of July, in the year of our Lord one thousand seven hundred and forty-six, and submit to Justice.	The whole act.
23 Geo. 3. c. 34	Attainder of David Ogilvy (Disabilities Removed on Pardon) Act 1783	An Act for removing certain disabilities and incapacities occasioned by the Attainder of David Ogilvy of Airly Esquire.	The whole act.

==== Part V: Ecclesiastical Law ====
Part V — Ecclesiastical Law
Citation	Short title	Extent of repeal
26 Hen. 8. c. 14	Suffragan Bishops Act 1534	Section 7.
10 Anne c. 10	Scottish Episcopalians Act 1711	Sections 4 and 13.
31 Geo. 3. c. 32	Roman Catholic Relief Act 1791	Sections 5 and 6.
32 Geo. 3. c. 63	Scottish Episcopalians Relief Act 1792	The whole act.
52 Geo. 3. c. 155	Places of Religious Worship Act 1812	The whole act.
1 & 2 Vict. c. 23	Parsonages Act 1838	Section 14.
2 & 3 Vict. c. 30	Spiritual Duties Act 1839	The whole act.
2 & 3 Vict. c. 49	Church Building Act 1839	Sections 6 and 7.
3 & 4 Vict. c. 113	Ecclesiastical Commissioners Act 1840	Sections 37, 70 and 77.
4 & 5 Vict. c. 39	Ecclesiastical Commissioners Act 1841	Section 23.
6 & 7 Vict. c. 77	Welsh Cathedrals Act 1843	The whole act.
7 & 8 Vict. c. 59	Lecturers and Parish Clerks Act 1844	In section 3, the words from the beginning to " place; and that ".
9 & 10 Vict. c. 59	Religious Disabilities Act 1846	Section 4 as it applies to Great Britain.
18 & 19 Vict. c. 81	Places of Worship Registration Act 1855	In section 2, the words from " by the said " to " mentioned and ". In section 3, the words from " and no such " to " quarter sessions ".
18 & 19 Vict. c. 86	Liberty of Religious Worship Act 1855	The preamble. Section 1.
29 & 30 Vict. c. 111	Ecclesiastical Commissioners Act 1866	Section 23.
31 & 32 Vict. c. 117	Incumbents Act 1868	The whole act.
32 & 33 Vict. c. 94	New Parishes Act and Church Building Acts Amendment Act 1869	Section 9.
16 & 17 Geo. 5. c. 48	Births and Deaths Registration Act 1926	Section 8.
14 & 15 Geo. 6. c. 39	Common Informers Act 1951	In the Schedule, the entry relating to the Places of Religious Worship Act 1812.
Church Assembly Measures
3 & 4 Geo. 6. No. 1	House of Laity (Postponement of Election) Measure 1939	The whole measure.
6 & 7 Geo. 6. No. 3	Diocesan Education Committees Measure 1943	Section 3.
9 & 10 Eliz. 2. No. 3	Clergy Pensions Measure 1961	Section 48(1). In Schedule 2, the paragraph relating to section 9 of the Bishops (Retirement) Measure 1951. Schedule 3.
1963 No. 1	Ecclesiastical Jurisdiction Measure 1963	In Schedule 4, the entry relating to the Places of Religious Worship Act 1812.
1963 No. 2	Cathedrals Measure 1963	Section 54(1). In Schedule 1, the entries relating to the Ecclesiastical Leases Act 1765, the Episcopal and Capitular Estates Act 1851, the Episcopal and Capitular Estates Act 1854 and section 4 of the Ecclesiastical Commissioners Act 1886. Schedule 2.

==== Part VI: Electricity and Gas ====
Part VI — Electricity and Gas
Citation	Short title	Extent of repeal
23 & 24 Vict. c. 125	Metropolis Gas Act 1860	The whole act.
24 & 25 Vict. c. 79	Metropolis Gas Act 1861	The whole act.
10 & 11 Geo. 6. c. 54	Electricity Act 1947	In section 3(3), the proviso. Sections 14 to 16, 20, 21, 27, 28, 31 to 33 and 35. In section 38, subsections (1) to (3), and in subsection (4) the words from " (except " to " forty-three) ". Sections 40, 59 and 68(5). Schedule 3.
2 & 3 Eliz. 2. c. 60	Electricity Reorganisation (Scotland) Act 1954	Sections 3 to 9. In section 11(1), the words from " subsection (2) " to " or of ".
5 & 6 Eliz. 2. c. 48	Electricity Act 1957	Section 1. In section 16(3), the words from the beginning to " compensation) ". Section 20(8). In section 25, subsections (1) and (2); in subsection (3), the words from the beginning to " but "; and subsections (4) to (6). Section 26. In Schedule 3, paragraphs 1(1), 3(1) to (4), 7 to 10, 13 and 14. In Schedule 4, the entries relating to sections 16, 20, 21, 33 and 40 of the Electricity Act 1947.
1972 c. 60	Gas Act 1972	In section 48(1), in the definition of " local enactment ", the words from " and also " onwards.

==== Part VII: Family Law ====
Part VII — Family Law
Citation	Short title	Extent of repeal
21 & 22 Vict. c. 93	Legitimacy Declaration Act 1858	The whole act except sections 9 to 11. In section 11, the words from the beginning to "Act; and ".
20 & 21 Geo. 5. c. 37	Adoption of Children (Scotland) Act 1930	The whole act.
22 & 23 Geo. 5. c. 46	Children and Young Persons Act 1932	The whole act.
11 & 12 Geo. 6. c. 43	Children Act 1948	In Schedule 2, paragraphs 1 to 3, 4(2), 5 and 6. In Schedule 3, in the entry relating to section 86 of the Children and Young Persons Act 1933, the words from " and the words " onwards; the entries relating to sections 95 and 97 of that Act; and the entries relating to the Children and Young Persons (Scotland) Act 1937.
1963 c. 37	Children and Young Persons Act 1963	Section 62. Schedule 4.
1965 c. 72	Matrimonial Causes Act 1965	In section 46(4), the words " Subject to the provisions of section 38(2) of this Act,".
1968 c. 36	Maintenance Orders Act 1968	In the Schedule, the entry relating to the Guardianship of Infants Act 1925.
1970 c. 45	Matrimonial Proceedings and Property Act 1970	Section 12. In section 43(4), the words " Subject to the provisions of section 12(2) of this Act,".
1971 c. 3	Guardianship of Minors Act 1971	Sections 18(2) and 19. Schedule 2.
1973 c. 18	Matrimonial Causes Act 1973	Section 54(1)(b). In section 55(3), the words " and 7(3) ". In Schedule 2, paragraph 7(2) and (3). Schedule 3.
1975 c. 72	Children Act 1975	In Schedule 3, paragraph 3.

==== Part VIII: Finance ====
Part VIII — Finance
Citation	Short title	Extent of repeal
5 & 6 Will. 4. c. 35	Paymaster General Act 1835	Sections 10 and 11.
11 & 12 Vict. c. 55	Paymaster General Act 1848	Sections 3 and 6.
15 & 16 Vict. c. 28	Commissioners of Works Act 1852	Section 3.
38 & 39 Vict. c. 52	Washington Treaty (Claims) Act 1875	The whole act.
40 & 41 Vict. c. 2	Treasury Bills Act 1877	In section 2, the definitions of " Comptroller and Auditor-General of the receipt and issue of Her Majesty's Exchequer " and of " financial year ". In section 8(1), the words " of the receipt and issue of Her Majesty's Exchequer ".
55 & 56 Vict. c. 35	Colonial Stock Act 1892	Section 2(3) to (5).
61 & 62 Vict. c. 4	Greek Loan Act 1898	The whole act.
63 & 64 Vict. c. 62	Colonial Stock Act 1900	The whole act.
13 Geo. 5. Sess. 2. c. 4	Trade Facilities and Loans Guarantee Act 1922 (Session 2)	The whole act.
14 & 15 Geo. 5. c. 8	Trade Facilities Act 1924	The whole act.
2 & 3 Geo. 6. c. 48	Agricultural Development Act 1939	Section 32.
7 & 8 Geo. 6. c. 28	Agriculture (Miscellaneous Provisions) Act 1944	In section 2, in subsection (1), the words " or the growing produce thereof "; and subsection (2). Section 8(b)(iii).
4 & 5 Eliz. 2. c. 6	Miscellaneous Financial Provisions Act 1955	Section 1.
7 & 8 Eliz. 2. c. 2	Agricultural Mortgage Corporation Act 1958	The whole act.
9 Eliz. 2. c. 1	Indus Basin Development Fund Act 1960	The whole act.
1966 c. 21	Overseas Aid Act 1966	Section 3.
1975 c. 26	Ministers of the Crown Act 1975	In Schedule 2, in Part I, the entry relating to the Indus Basin Development Fund Act 1960.

==== Part IX: Highways ====
Part IX — Highways
Citation	Short title	Description	Extent of repeal
32 Geo. 3. c. 38	Montrose Bridge Act 1792	An Act for building a bridge over the River South Esk, at or near the town of Montrose in the county of Forfar; and for making suitable approaches thereto.	The whole act.
56 Geo. 3. c. lxxxiii	Glasgow and Carlisle Road Improvement Act 1816	An Act for improving the road from the City of Glasgow to the City of Carlisle.	The whole act.
58 Geo. 3. c. 44	Glasgow and Carlisle Road Act 1818	An Act to alter the application of part of the sum of fifty thousand pounds granted by [the Act 56 Geo. 3. c. lxxxiii].	The whole act.
9 & 10 Geo. 5. c. 50	Ministry of Transport Act 1919	Ministry of Transport Act 1919.	Section 5. In section 17(1), the words from "And the power " to " determine ". In Schedule 1, paragraphs 2 and 3. Schedule 2, except as it applies to Scotland.
7 & 8 Eliz. 2. c. 25	Highways Act 1959	Highways Act 1959.	Sections 120(4) and 134(5). In section 209, in subsection (1), the words " or by a corresponding provision of a local Act "; and in subsection (2) the words " or under a corresponding provision of a local Act ". Section 212. In section 222(9), the words " a highway authority, or " except as regards any order of which notice of the making or preparation in draft was first published before 6th April 1976. In section 223(1), the words from " or in Part III " to " authorising the acquisition of any such right " except as regards any order of which notice of the making or preparation in draft was first published before 6th April 1976. Section 244. Section 257(3) and (4). In section 261(4)(a), the words " two hundred and forty-four,". In section 289, the words " two hundred and forty-four ". Section 306. In Schedule 17, in the heading, the words " 244 ".
10 & 11 Eliz. 2. c. 16	Forth and Clyde Canal (Extinguishment of Rights of Navigation) Act 1962	Forth and Clyde Canal (Extinguishment of Rights of Navigation) Act 1962.	The whole act.
1971 c. 78	Town and Country Planning Act 1971	Town and Country Planning Act 1971.	In Schedule 3, paragraph 8(a)(ii).
1972 c. 70	Local Government Act 1972	Local Government Act 1972.	In section 171, the words " 212 ". In Schedule 21, in paragraph 87(2), the words " (3) and (4) ".

==== Part X: Illicit Distillation ====
Part X — Illicit Distillation
Citation	Short title	Extent of repeal
1 & 2 Will. 4. c. 55	Illicit Distillation (Ireland) Act 1831	The whole act.
17 & 18 Vict. c. 89	Spirits (Ireland) Act 1854	The whole act.
18 & 19 Vict. c. 103	Spirits (Ireland) Act 1855	The whole act.
20 & 21 Vict. c. 40	Illicit Distillation (Ireland) Act 1857	The whole act.
24 & 25 Vict. c. 91	Revenue (No. 2) Act 1861	The whole act.
30 & 31 Vict. c. 90	Revenue Act 1867	The whole act.
31 & 32 Vict. c. 124	Inland Revenue Act 1868	Section 6.
13 & 14 Geo. 5. c. 14	Finance Act 1923	Section 13.
15 & 16 Geo. 6 & 1 Eliz. 2. c. 44	Customs and Excise Act 1952	Section 314(3).
Acts of Parliament of Northern Ireland
13 & 14 Geo. 5. c. 12 (N.I.)	Intoxicating Liquor Act (Northern Ireland) 1923	In section 8(1), paragraph (b) and the preceding " and ".
1971 c. 13 (N.I.)	Licensing Act (Northern Ireland) 1971	Sections 71(1)(b) and 73(1)(c).

==== Part XI: Local Government ====
Part XI — Local Government
Citation	Short title	Description	Extent of repeal
4 Hen. 7. c. 15	River Thames Act 1488	An Act that the Mayor of London shall have the rule of the Ryver of Thames from Stanes to Yenlade.	The whole act.
33 Hen. 8. c. 13	Lordships of Wales Act 1541	An Acte concerninge certen Lordshippes translated from the Countie of Denbigh to the Countye of Flyntshire.	The whole act.
3 Geo. 2. c. 31	Brokers (Bristol) Act 1729	An Act for the admission and regulation of brokers within the City of Bristol.	The whole act.
17 Geo. 3. c. 66	Mile End Night Watch Act 1777	An Act for establishing a nightly watch within the hamlet of Mile-end Old Town, in the parish of Saint Dunstan Stepney, otherwise Stebonheath, in the county of Middlesex.	The whole act.
35 Geo. 3. c. 76	Aberdeen Improvements Act 1795	An Act for the better paving, lighting, cleansing, and otherwise improving the streets, lanes and other public passages of the City of Aberdeen, and the roads and avenues within the Royalty thereof; for the better supplying the inhabitants with fresh water; and for the removing and preventing all obstructions and annoyances within the said City and Royalty.	The whole act.
14 & 15 Vict. c. 67	Gunpowder in Mersey Act 1851	An Act to repeal so much of an Act of the 12th year of King George the Third, relating to the making, keeping and carriage of gunpowder, as exempts therefrom certain gunpowder magazines and stores near Liverpool, and to make certain temporary provisions with regard to the said magazines and stores.	The whole act.
19 & 20 Vict. c. 103	Nuisances Removal (Scotland) Act 1856	Nuisances Removal (Scotland) Act 1856.	The whole act.
25 & 26 Vict. c. 69	Harbours Transfer Act 1862	Harbours Transfer Act 1862.	Section 10(2).
28 & 29 Vict. c. 7	General Police and Improvement (Scotland) Supplemental Act 1865	General Police and Improvement (Scotland) Supplemental Act 1865.	The whole act.
30 & 31 Vict. c. 79	General Police and Improvement (Scotland) Supplemental Act 1867	General Police and Improvement (Scotland) Supplemental Act 1867.	The whole act.
30 & 31 Vict. c. 85	Galashiels Act 1867	An Act to include the whole of the Burgh of Galashiels within the County, Sheriffdom and Commissariot of Selkirk.	The whole act.
33 & 34 Vict. c. 16	Inverness and Elgin County Boundaries Act 1870	Inverness and Elgin County Boundaries Act 1870.	Sections 4 to 7 and 10 to 16.
35 & 36 Vict. c. 47	Galashiels and Selkirk Act 1872	An Act to amend [the Act 30 & 31 Vict. c. 85].	The whole act.
38 & 39 Vict. c. 17	Explosives Act 1875	Explosives Act 1875.	Section 99.
3 Edw. 7. c. 5	Berwickshire County Town Act 1903	Berwickshire County Town Act 1903.	The whole act.
3 & 4 Geo. 5. c. 17	Fabrics (Misdescription) Act 1913	Fabrics (Misdescription) Act 1913.	In section 5, in subsection (1), the words from " and for that purpose " onwards; and subsection (3). Sections 6 and 8(3).
4 & 5 Geo. 5. c. 46	Milk and Dairies (Scotland) Act 1914	Milk and Dairies (Scotland) Act 1914.	Section 31(3).
5 & 6 Geo. 5. c. 49	Housing (Rosyth Dockyard) Act 1915	Housing (Rosyth Dockyard) Act 1915.	The whole act.
6 & 7 Geo. 5. c. 12	Local Government (Emergency Provisions) Act 1916	Local Government (Emergency Provisions) Act 1916.	Sections 3, 6 and 13. In section 21, the paragraph defining "civil remuneration". In section 22(1), the words from " a reference to the Elementary " onwards.
9 & 10 Geo. 5. c. 35	Housing, Town Planning, &c. Act 1919	Housing, Town Planning, &c. Act 1919.	Part I.
16 & 17 Geo. 5. c. 47	Rating (Scotland) Act 1926	Rating (Scotland) Act 1926.	Section 26.
4 & 5 Eliz. 2. c. 66	Sanitary Inspectors (Change of Designation) Act 1956	Sanitary Inspectors (Change of Designation) Act 1956.	The whole act.
5 & 6 Eliz. 2. c. 56	Housing Act 1957	Housing Act 1957.	Sections 149(3) and 191(1). Schedule 11.
8 & 9 Eliz. 2. c. 61	Mental Health (Scotland) Act 1960	Mental Health (Scotland) Act 1960.	Section 12(6).
10 & 11 Eliz. 2. c. 12	Education Act 1962	Education Act 1962.	Section 8.
10 & 11 Eliz. 2. c. 33	Health Visiting and Social Work (Training) Act 1962	Health Visiting and Social Work (Training) Act 1962.	Section 5(2).
1963 c. 33	London Government Act 1963	London Government Act 1963.	In Schedule 11, in Part I, paragraph 41.
1964 c. 48	Police Act 1964	Police Act 1964.	Section 26(2).
1967 c. 78	Water (Scotland) Act 1967	Water (Scotland) Act 1967.	In section 12(4), the words from " and for the purposes " onwards.
1970 c. 38	Building (Scotland) Act 1970	Building (Scotland) Act 1970.	In Schedule 1, in paragraph 1(c) of Part I, the words " section 33 of the Civil Defence Act 1939,".
1973 c. 65	Local Government (Scotland) Act 1973	Local Government (Scotland) Act 1973.	In Schedule 15, paragraph 26. In Schedule 28, paragraph 39.

==== Part XII: Marriages Validation ====
Part XII — Marriages Validation
Citation	Short title	Description	Extent of repeal
21 Geo. 3. c. 53	Confirmation of Certain Marriages Act 1781	An Act to render valid certain marriages, solemnized in certain churches and publick chapels in which banns had not usually been published before or at the time of passing an Act made in the 26th year of King George the Second, intituled, An Act for the better preventing of Clandestine Marriages.	The whole act.
44 Geo. 3. c. 77	Marriages Confirmation Act 1804	Marriages Confirmation Act 1804.	The whole act.
47 Geo. 3. Sess. 2. c. lxxvi	Wallsend Parish Church Act 1807	An Act for taking down the present church, and providing a new church and church yard, in the parish of Wallsend in the county of Northumberland; and for rendering valid certain marriages solemnized in the said parish while the present church has been in a state of decay.	Sections 43 to 45.
48 Geo. 3. c. 127	Marriages Confirmation Act 1808	Marriages Confirmation Act 1808.	The whole act.
3 Geo. 4. c. 75	Confirmation of Marriages Act 1822	An Act to amend certain provisions of the 26th of George the Second, for the better preventing of clandestine marriages.	The whole act.
4 Geo. 4. c. 5	Confirmation of Certain Marriages Act 1823	An Act to render valid certain marriages.	The whole act.
6 Geo. 4. c. 92	Marriages Confirmation Act 1825	Marriages Confirmation Act 1825.	Sections 1 and 4.
11 Geo. 4 & 1 Will. 4. c. 18	Marriage Confirmation Act 1830	Marriage Confirmation Act 1830.	Sections 1, 4 and 5.
6 & 7 Will. 4. c. 24	Marriages in St. Anne's Chapel, Wandsworth Act 1836	An Act to render valid certain marriages solemnized in a chapel of ease, in the parish of Wandsworth in the county of Surrey, called Saint Anne's Chapel.	The whole act.
6 & 7 Will. 4. c. 92	Marriages in St. Clements, Oxford Act 1836	An Act to render valid certain marriages solemnized in the Church of Saint Clement, Oxford.	The whole act.
5 & 6 Vict. c. 113	Marriages Confirmation (Ireland) Act 1842	An Act for confirmation of certain marriages in Ireland.	The whole act.
6 & 7 Vict. c. 39	Marriages Confirmation (Ireland) Act 1843	An Act for confirmation of certain marriages in Ireland.	The whole act.
9 & 10 Vict. c. 72	Marriages (Ireland) Act 1846	Marriages (Ireland) Act 1846.	In section 4, the words from " and all marriages heretofore solemnized " onwards.
10 & 11 Vict. c. 58	Marriages of Jews and Quakers Act 1847	An Act to remove doubts as to Quakers' and Jews' marriages solemnized before certain periods.	The whole act.
13 & 14 Vict. c. 38	Marriages Confirmation Act 1850	An Act to render valid certain marriages solemnized in the new church at Upton cum Chalvey in the county of Buckingham and diocese of Oxford.	The whole act.
16 & 17 Vict. c. 122	Confirmation of Marriages Act 1853	An Act to render valid certain marriages in the Church of the Holy Trinity in the township of Hulme and parish of Manchester in the county of Lancaster.	The whole act.
18 & 19 Vict. c. 66	Confirmation of Marriages Act 1855	An Act to render valid certain marriages in Christ Church in the chapelry of Todmorden and parish of Rochdale in the counties of Lancaster and York.	The whole act.
18 & 19 Vict. c. 81	Places of Worship Registration Act 1855	Places of Worship Registration Act 1855.	Section 13.
19 & 20 Vict. c. 70	Confirmation of Marriages Act 1856	An Act to render valid certain marriages in the Church at Coatham in the parish of Kirk Leatham in the county of York.	The whole act.
20 & 21 Vict. c. 29	Confirmation of Marriages Act 1857	An Act to render valid certain marriages in Christ Church, West Hartlepool, in the parish of Stranton in the county of Durham.	The whole act.
22 Vict. c. 24	Confirmation of Marriages Act 1859	An Act to render valid certain marriages in the Church of Saint James Baldersby in the county of York.	The whole act.
23 & 24 Vict. c. 1	Confirmation of Marriages Act 1860	An Act to render valid certain marriages in the chapel of Saint Mary in Rydal in the county of Westmoreland.	The whole act.
24 & 25 Vict. c. 16	Confirmation of Marriages Act 1861	An Act to render valid marriages heretofore solemnized in Trinity Church, Rainow, and in other churches and chapels.	The whole act.
28 & 29 Vict. c. 81	Marriages at St. James's Chapel, Eastbury Act 1865	An Act to render valid marriages heretofore solemnized in the chapel of ease called Saint James-the-Greater Chapel, Eastbury, in the parish of Lamborne in the county of Berks.	The whole act.
31 & 32 Vict. c. 23	Frampton Mansel Marriage Act 1868	Frampton Mansel Marriage Act 1868.	The whole act.
31 & 32 Vict. c. 113	Confirmation of Marriages, Blakedown Chapel Act 1868	An Act to render valid marriages heretofore solemnized in the chapel of ease called Saint James-the-Greater Chapel, Blakedown, in the parish of Hagley in the county of Worcester.	The whole act.
32 & 33 Vict. c. 30	Cowgill Parish Marriages Confirmation, Park Gate Chapel Act 1869	An Act to legalize certain marriages celebrated at Park Gate Chapel, and to change the name of the district chapelry annexed to the Chapel of Cowgill.	The preamble and section 1.
36 & 37 Vict. c. 1	Confirmation of Marriages (Cove Chapel) Act 1873	An Act for legalizing certain marriages solemnized in Cove Chapel in Pitt Portion in the parish of Tiverton, Devon.	The whole act.
36 & 37 Vict. c. 16	Marriage Law (Ireland) Amendment Act 1873	Marriage Law (Ireland) Amendment Act 1873.	Section 2.
36 & 37 Vict. c. 20	Marriages Confirmation (Fulford Chapel) Act 1873	An Act for legalizing marriages solemnized in Fulford Chapel, in the parish of Stone, Staffordshire.	The whole act.
36 & 37 Vict. c. 25	Marriages Confirmation (Gretton Chapel) Act 1873	An Act for legalizing marriages solemnized in Gretton Chapel, in the parish of Winchcomb, Gloucestershire.	The whole act.
36 & 37 Vict. c. 28	Marriages Confirmation (Eton) Act 1873	An Act to render valid marriages heretofore solemnized in the chapel of ease called " Saint John the Evangelist " Chapel, Eton, in the parish of Eton in the county of Buckingham.	The whole act.
37 & 38 Vict. c. 14	Marriages Confirmation (Pooley Bridge) Act 1874	An Act to render valid marriages heretofore solemnized in the chapel of ease called " Saint Paul's Church at Pooley Bridge ", in the parish of Barton in the county of Westmorland.	The whole act.
37 & 38 Vict. c. 17	Marriages Confirmation (Bentley) Act 1874	An Act to render valid marriages heretofore solemnized in the chapel of ease called Saint John the Evangelist, at Bentley, in the parish of Shustock in the county of Warwick.	The whole act.
39 & 40 Vict. c. i	Marriages (St James' Chapel of Ease) Buxton 1876 Act	An Act to render valid marriages heretofore solemnized in the chapel of ease of Saint James in the parish of Buxton in the county of Derby.	The whole act.
40 & 41 Vict. c. lxxii	Marriages Legalization, Saint Peter's, Almondsbury, Act 1877	Marriages Legalization, Saint Peter's, Almondsbury, Act 1877.	The whole act.
44 & 45 Vict. c. clxvi	Alsager Chapel (Marriages) Act 1881	Alsager Chapel (Marriages) Act 1881.	The whole act.
47 & 48 Vict. c. i	Stopsley Marriage Legalization Act 1884	Stopsley Marriage Legalization Act 1884.	The whole act.
47 & 48 Vict. c. xii	Wood Green Congregational Church Marriage Legalization Act 1884	Wood Green Congregational Church Marriage Legalization Act 1884.	The whole act.
48 & 49 Vict. c. cx	District of Saint John Cowley Act 1885	District of Saint John Cowley Act 1885.	The whole act.
51 & 52 Vict. c. 28	Marriages Validation Act 1888	Marriages Validation Act 1888.	The whole act.
62 & 63 Vict. c. 27	Marriages Validity Act 1899	Marriages Validity Act 1899.	In section 1, the words "solemnized, or", "in England or ", " or be deemed to have been ", and " in the case of a marriage in England resident in Ireland, or in the case of a marriage in Ireland ".
62 & 63 Vict. c. xxxiii	Farnley Tyas Marriages Legalization Act 1899	Farnley Tyas Marriages Legalization Act 1899.	The whole act.
1 Edw. 7. c. 23	Marriages Legalization Act 1901	Marriages Legalization Act 1901.	The whole act.
3 Edw. 7. c. 26	Marriages Legalization Act 1903	Marriages Legalization Act 1903.	The whole act.
6 Edw. 7. c. xxvi	Provisional Order (Marriages) Confirmation Act 1906	Provisional Order (Marriages) Confirmation Act 1906.	The whole act.
7 Edw. 7. c. xlvii	Provisional Order (Marriages) Confirmation Act 1907	Provisional Order (Marriages) Confirmation Act 1907.	The whole act.
8 Edw. 7. c. cxxxix	Provisional Order (Marriages) Confirmation Act 1908	Provisional Order (Marriages) Confirmation Act 1908.	The whole act.
9 Edw. 7. c. cxxv	Provisional Order (Marriages) Confirmation Act 1909	Provisional Order (Marriages) Confirmation Act 1909.	The whole act.
9 Edw. 7. c. clv	Provisional Order (Marriages) Confirmation (No. 2) Act 1909	Provisional Order (Marriages) Confirmation (No. 2) Act 1909.	The whole act.
1 & 2 Geo. 5. c. xxxvii	Provisional Order (Marriages) Confirmation Act 1911	Provisional Order (Marriages) Confirmation Act 1911.	The whole act.
2 & 3 Geo. 5. c. clix	Provisional Order (Marriages) Confirmation Act 1912	Provisional Order (Marriages) Confirmation Act 1912.	The whole act.
4 & 5 Geo. 5. c. lix	Provisional Order (Marriages) Confirmation Act 1914	Provisional Order (Marriages) Confirmation Act 1914.	The whole act.
5 & 6 Geo. 5. c. lxxxi	Provisional Order (Marriages) Confirmation Act 1915	Provisional Order (Marriages) Confirmation Act 1915.	The whole act.
6 & 7 Geo. 5. c. xxxi	Provisional Order (Marriages) Confirmation Act 1916	Provisional Order (Marriages) Confirmation Act 1916.	The whole act.
7 & 8 Geo. 5. c. vii	Provisional Order (Marriages) Confirmation Act 1917	Provisional Order (Marriages) Confirmation Act 1917.	The whole act.
8 & 9 Geo. 5. c. v	Provisional Order (Marriages) Confirmation Act 1918	Provisional Order (Marriages) Confirmation Act 1918.	The whole act.
10 & 11 Geo. 5. c. cii	Provisional Order (Marriages) Confirmation Act 1920	Provisional Order (Marriages) Confirmation Act 1920.	The whole act.
11 & 12 Geo. 5. c. lxvi	Provisional Order (Marriages) Confirmation Act 1921	Provisional Order (Marriages) Confirmation Act 1921.	The whole act.
12 & 13 Geo. 5. c. iv	Provisional Order (Marriages) Confirmation Act 1922	Provisional Order (Marriages) Confirmation Act 1922.	The whole act.
12 & 13 Geo. 5. c. c	Provisional Order (Marriages) Confirmation (No. 2) Act 1922	Provisional Order (Marriages) Confirmation (No. 2) Act 1922.	The whole act.
13 & 14 Geo. 5. c. lviii	Provisional Order (Marriages) Confirmation Act 1923	Provisional Order (Marriages) Confirmation Act 1923.	The whole act.
15 & 16 Geo. 5. c. xxxix	Provisional Order (Marriages) Confirmation Act 1925	Provisional Order (Marriages) Confirmation Act 1925.	The whole act.
16 & 17 Geo. 5. c. xviii	Provisional Order (Marriages) Confirmation Act 1926	Provisional Order (Marriages) Confirmation Act 1926.	The whole act.
16 & 17 Geo. 5. c. xl	Provisional Order (Marriages) Confirmation (No. 2) Act 1926	Provisional Order (Marriages) Confirmation (No. 2) Act 1926.	The whole act.
17 & 18 Geo. 5. c. xxx	Provisional Order (Marriages) Confirmation Act 1927	Provisional Order (Marriages) Confirmation Act 1927.	The whole act.
18 & 19 Geo. 5. c. ix	Provisional Orders (Marriages) Confirmation Act 1928	Provisional Orders (Marriages) Confirmation Act 1928.	The whole act.
19 & 20 Geo. 5. c. xix	Provisional Orders (Marriages) Confirmation Act 1929	Provisional Orders (Marriages) Confirmation Act 1929.	The whole act.
20 & 21 Geo. 5. c. cxxxv	Provisional Order (Marriages) Confirmation Act 1930	Provisional Order (Marriages) Confirmation Act 1930.	The whole act.
21 & 22 Geo. 5. c. vii	Provisional Orders (Marriages) Confirmation Act 1931	Provisional Orders (Marriages) Confirmation Act 1931.	The whole act.
22 & 23 Geo. 5. c. x	Provisional Orders (Marriages) Confirmation Act 1932	Provisional Orders (Marriages) Confirmation Act 1932.	The whole act.
22 & 23 Geo. 5. c. xlvii	Provisional Order (Marriages) Confirmation (No. 2) Act 1932	Provisional Order (Marriages) Confirmation (No. 2) Act 1932.	The whole act.
23 & 24 Geo. 5. c. xxix	Provisional Orders (Marriages) Confirmation Act 1933	Provisional Orders (Marriages) Confirmation Act 1933.	The whole act.
24 & 25 Geo. 5. c. xlvii	Provisional Orders (Marriages) Confirmation Act 1934	Provisional Orders (Marriages) Confirmation Act 1934.	The whole act.
25 & 26 Geo. 5. c. lx	Provisional Orders (Marriages) Confirmation Act 1935	Provisional Orders (Marriages) Confirmation Act 1935.	The whole act.
26 Geo. 5 & 1 Edw. 8. c. lxxix	Provisional Orders (Marriages) Confirmation Act 1936	Provisional Orders (Marriages) Confirmation Act 1936.	The whole act.
1 Edw. 8 & 1 Geo. 6. c. lxii	Provisional Orders (Marriages) Confirmation Act 1937	Provisional Orders (Marriages) Confirmation Act 1937.	The whole act.
1 & 2 Geo. 6. c. xlvi	Provisional Order (Marriages) Confirmation Act 1938	Provisional Order (Marriages) Confirmation Act 1938.	The whole act.
4 & 5 Geo. 6. c. xv	Provisional Orders (Marriages) Confirmation Act 1941	Provisional Orders (Marriages) Confirmation Act 1941.	The whole act.
6 & 7 Geo. 6. c. viii	Provisional Order (Marriages) Confirmation Act 1943	Provisional Order (Marriages) Confirmation Act 1943.	The whole act.
8 & 9 Geo. 6. c. ix	Provisional Order (Marriages) Confirmation Act 1945	Provisional Order (Marriages) Confirmation Act 1945.	The whole act.
10 & 11 Geo. 6. c. xx	Provisional Orders (Marriages) Confirmation Act 1947	Provisional Orders (Marriages) Confirmation Act 1947.	The whole act.
12 & 13 Geo. 6. c. xxiv	Provisional Orders (Marriages) Confirmation Act 1949	Provisional Orders (Marriages) Confirmation Act 1949.	The whole act.

==== Part XIII: Northern Ireland constitutional provisions ====
Part XIII — Northern Ireland Constitutional Provisions
Citation	Short title	Extent of repeal
1972 c. 22	Northern Ireland (Temporary Provisions) Act 1972	The Schedule except paragraphs 6(2) and 7.
1973 c. 37	Water Act 1973	Section 40(6).
1973 c. 39	Statute Law (Repeals) Act 1973	In section 2(1), the words from " but nothing " onwards. In Schedule 2, in paragraph 2(2), the words from " but nothing " onwards.
1973 c. 41	Fair Trading Act 1973	Section 136.
1973 c. 43	Hallmarking Act 1973	In section 24(3), the words from " and, so far " onwards.
1973 c. 45	Domicile and Matrimonial Proceedings Act 1973	Section 15(4).
1973 c. 48	Pakistan Act 1973	Section 5.
1973 c. 49	Bangladesh Act 1973	In the Schedule, paragraphs 3(3) and 10(2).
1973 c. 50	Employment and Training Act 1973	Section 12(5).
1973 c. 51	Finance Act 1973	Section 56(6).
1973 c. 55	Statute Law Revision (Northern Ireland) Act 1973	Section 3(3).
1973 c. 58	Insurance Companies Amendment Act 1973	Section 56(2).
1973 c. 61	Pensioners' Payments and National Insurance Act 1973	Section 9(2).
1973 c. 62	Powers of Criminal Courts Act 1973	Section 59(2) and (4).

==== Part XIV: Oaths and declarations ====
Part XIV — Oaths and Declarations
Citation	Short title	Extent of repeal
11 Geo. 4 & 1 Will. 4. c. 43	Demise of the Crown Act 1830	The whole act.
3 & 4 Will. 4. c. 49	Quakers and Moravians Act 1833	The whole act.
1 & 2 Vict. c. 77	Quakers and Moravians Act 1838	The whole act.
31 & 32 Vict. c. 72	Promissory Oaths Act 1868	In section 14, in paragraph 2, the words " or by privy councillors of Ireland "; and paragraph 11. In the Schedule, in Part I, the words " President of the Poor Law Board " and the entry relating to Ireland; and in Part II the words " The Lord Justices of the Court of Appeal in Chancery ", " The Vice Chancellors ", " The Puisne Justices of the Queen's Bench " and " The Judge of the Admiralty Court ".
52 & 53 Vict. c. 10	Commissioners for Oaths Act 1889	Section 13.
6 & 7 Geo. 6. c. 18	Evidence and Powers of Attorney Act 1943	The whole act except sections 4 and 5. In section 5, subsection (1); and in subsection (2), the words from " and this Act " onwards.

==== Part XV: Overseas territories ====
Part XV — Overseas Territories
Citation	Short title	Description	Extent of repeal
6 Geo. 4. c. 75	Canada Company Act 1825	An Act to enable His Majesty to grant to a company, to be incorporated by charter, to be called " The Canada Company ", certain lands in the Province of Upper Canada, and to invest the said Company with certain powers and privileges, and for other purposes relating thereto.	The whole act.
9 Geo. 4. c. 51	Canada Company Amendment Act 1828	An Act to alter and amend [the Act 6 Geo. 4. c. 75].	The whole act.
18 & 19 Vict. c. 104	Chinese Passengers Act 1855	Chinese Passengers Act 1855.	The whole act.
37 & 38 Vict. c. 92	Alderney Harbour (Transfer) Act 1874	Alderney Harbour (Transfer) Act 1874.	The whole act.
57 & 58 Vict. c. 60	Merchant Shipping Act 1894	Merchant Shipping Act 1894.	Section 746(1).
63 & 64 Vict. c. 38	Elementary School Teachers Superannuation (Isle of Man) Act 1900	Elementary School Teachers Superannuation (Isle of Man) Act 1900.	The whole act.
6 & 7 Geo. 5. c. xiv (Note: Incorrectly cited as "16 & 17 Geo. 5. c. xiv" in the act.)	Canada Company Act 1916	The Canada Company's Act 1916.	The whole act.
11 & 12 Geo. 6. c. 3	Burma Independence Act 1947	Burma Independence Act 1947.	Section 3.
11 & 12 Geo. 6. c. 7	Ceylon Independence Act 1947	Ceylon Independence Act 1947.	In Schedule 2, paragraphs 2 and 7.
5 & 6 Eliz. 2. c. 6	Ghana Independence Act 1957	Ghana Independence Act 1957.	In Schedule 2, paragraphs 3 and 10.
5 & 6 Eliz. 2. c. 60	Federation of Malaya Independence Act 1957	Federation of Malaya Independence Act 1957.	In Schedule 1, paragraphs 7 and 12.
6 & 7 Eliz. 2. c. 11	Isle of Man Act 1958	Isle of Man Act 1958.	In section 1(3), the words from " the Isle " (where first occurring) to " 1947, and,".
8 & 9 Eliz. 2. c. 41	Ghana (Consequential Provision) Act 1960	Ghana (Consequential Provision) Act 1960.	Section 2.
8 & 9 Eliz. 2. c. 52	Cyprus Act 1960	Cyprus Act 1960.	Section 5.
8 & 9 Eliz. 2. c. 55	Nigeria Independence Act 1960	Nigeria Independence Act 1960.	In Schedule 2, paragraph 10.
9 & 10 Eliz. 2. c. 16	Sierra Leone Independence Act 1961	Sierra Leone Independence Act 1961.	In Schedule 3, paragraph 11.
10 & 11 Eliz. 2. c. 1	Tanganyika Independence Act 1961	Tanganyika Independence Act 1961.	In Schedule 2, paragraph 10.
10 & 11 Eliz. 2. c. 40	Jamaica Independence Act 1962	Jamaica Independence Act 1962.	In Schedule 2, paragraph 10.
10 & 11 Eliz. 2. c. 54	Trinidad and Tobago Independence Act 1962	Trinidad and Tobago Independence Act 1962.	In Schedule 2, paragraph 10.
10 & 11 Eliz. 2. c. 57	Uganda Independence Act 1962	Uganda Independence Act 1962.	In Schedule 3, paragraph 10.
11 & 12 Eliz. 2. c. 1	Tanganyika Republic Act 1962	Tanganyika Republic Act 1962.	Section 2.
1963 c. 35	Malaysia Act 1963	Malaysia Act 1963.	In Schedule 2, paragraph 1(d).
1963 c. 54	Kenya Independence Act 1963	Kenya Independence Act 1963.	Section 6. In Schedule 2, paragraph 10.
1963 c. 55	Zanzibar Act 1963	Zanzibar Act 1963.	Sections 3 and 5. In Schedule 1, paragraph 10.
1963 c. 57	Nigeria Republic Act 1963	Nigeria Republic Act 1963.	Section 1(3).
1964 c. 20	Uganda Act 1964	Uganda Act 1964.	Section 3.
1964 c. 46	Malawi Independence Act 1964	Malawi Independence Act 1964.	Section 5. In Schedule 2, paragraph 10.
1964 c. 65	Zambia Independence Act 1964	Zambia Independence Act 1964.	Sections 5, 6 and 10.
1964 c. 86	Malta Independence Act 1964	Malta Independence Act 1964.	In Schedule 2, paragraphs 9 and 10.
1964 c. 93	Gambia Independence Act 1964	The Gambia Independence Act 1964.	In Schedule 2, paragraph 9.
1966 c. 14	Guyana Independence Act 1966	Guyana Independence Act 1966.	Section 7. In Schedule 2, paragraph 9.
1966 c. 23	Botswana Independence Act 1966	Botswana Independence Act 1966.	Sections 5, 6 and 7.
1966 c. 24	Lesotho Independence Act 1966	Lesotho Independence Act 1966.	Sections 5, 6 and 7.
1966 c. 37	Barbados Independence Act 1966	Barbados Independence Act 1966.	In Schedule 2, paragraph 9.
1967 c. 71	Aden, Perim and Kuria Muria Islands Act 1967	Aden, Perim and Kuria Muria Islands Act 1967.	Section 5. In section 6, subsection (3); and in subsection (4) the words " or section 5."
1968 c. 8	Mauritius Independence Act 1968	Mauritius Independence Act 1968.	In Schedule 2, paragraph 9.
1968 c. 56	Swaziland Independence Act 1968	Swaziland Independence Act 1968.	Sections 5 and 6.
1969 c. 29	Tanzania Act 1969	Tanzania Act 1969.	Section 3(1).
1970 c. 50	Fiji Independence Act 1970	Fiji Independence Act 1970.	In Schedule 2, paragraphs 7 and 9.
1972 c. 1	Sierra Leone Republic Act 1972	Sierra Leone Republic Act 1972.	Section 1(3).
1973 c. 27	The Bahamas Independence Act 1973	The Bahamas Independence Act 1973.	In Schedule 2, paragraph 6.
1973 c. 49	Bangladesh Act 1973	Bangladesh Act 1973.	In the Schedule, paragraph 7.

==== Part XVI: Property ====
Part XVI — Property
Citation	Short title	Description	Extent of repeal
4 Hen. 7. c. 14	Crown Lands Act 1488	(Crown Lands).	The whole act.
7 Hen. 7. c. 19	Prior of Christchurch Act 1491	(Priory of Christchurch).	The whole act.
25 Hen. 8. c. 25	Queen's Jointure Act 1533	An Acte concernyng the Quenes Joynture.	The whole act.
25 Hen. 8. c. 28	Queen Katherine Act 1533	An Acte for the lady Dowager.	The whole act.
28 Hen. 8. c. 45	Jointure of Queen Jane Act 1536	An Acte concernyng the Quenys Joynture.	The whole act.
6 Geo. 2. c. 32	Richard Norton's Will Act 1732	An Act to enable certain persons to propound the papers importing to be the last will, codicils and testamentary schedules of Richard Norton, late of Southwick in the county of Southampton, Esquire deceased, in the Prerogative Court of Canterbury, and to sue for administration with the same annexed.	The whole act.
10 Geo. 2. c. 37	Richard Norton's Will Act 1736	An Act to prevent [the Limitation Act 1623] being pleaded, insisted on, or taken advantage of, by any persons claiming under the last will of Richard Norton, Esquire, of Southwick, deceased, against any claim, title or demand, which Thomas Norton, Esquire, hath to or upon the manor of Old Alresford, and lands in the county of Southampton, settled by indenture of the fifth of March one thousand six hundred and fifty-seven, or the rents and profits thereof.	The whole act.
11 Geo. 2. c. 19	Distress for Rent Act 1737	Distress for Rent Act 1737.	Section 15.
13 Geo. 3. c. 17	Lord Blessington's Will Act 1772	An Act for making the exemplification of the last will and testament of William Earl of Blessington, in the Kingdom of Ireland, deceased, evidence as well in Ireland as in Great Britain.	The whole act.
16 Geo. 3. c. 10	Duchy of Cornwall Act 1776	An Act to enable His Majesty to make leases, copies, and grants of offices, lands, and hereditaments, parcel of the Dutchy of Cornwall, or annexed to the same; and for other purposes therein mentioned.	The whole act.
46 Geo. 3. c. 143	Windsor Forest Act 1806	An Act for enquiring into the state of Windsor Forest in the county of Berks, and for ascertaining the boundaries of the said Forest, and of the lands of the Crown within the same.	The whole act.
56 Geo. 3. c. 115	Claremont Estate Purchase (Grant of Life Interest) Act 1816	An Act for ratifying the purchase of the Claremont Estate, and for settling the same as a residence for Her Royal Highness the Princess Charlotte Augusta and His Serene Highness Leopold George Frederick, Prince of Cobourg of Saalfield.	The whole act.
7 Geo. 4. c. 16	Chelsea and Kilmainham Hospitals Act 1826	Chelsea and Kilmainham Hospitals Act 1826.	Sections 42 and 43. The Schedule.
4 & 5 Will. 4. c. 22	Apportionment Act 1834	Apportionment Act 1834.	The whole act.
13 & 14 Vict. c. 78	Marlborough House Settlement Act 1850	An Act to enable Her Majesty to make provision for the residence of His Royal Highness Albert Edward Prince of Wales in Marlborough House during the joint lives of Her Majesty and His Royal Highness.	The whole act.
15 & 16 Vict. c. 79	Inclosure Act 1852	Inclosure Act 1852.	Sections 18 and 19.
25 & 26 Vict. c. 49	Duchy of Cornwall Lands Act 1862	An Act to authorise the completion, after His Royal Highness Albert Edward Prince of Wales shall attain the age of twenty-one years, of arrangements commenced during his minority, under the provisions of [the Duchy of Cornwall Act 1844].	The whole act.
27 & 28 Vict. c. 60	Lease of College of Physicians Act 1864	An Act to enable Her Majesty to grant a lease for 999 years of the building known as the College of Physicians in Pall Mall East.	The whole act.
28 & 29 Vict. c. 49	Courts of Justice Concentration (Site) Act 1865	Courts of Justice Concentration (Site) Act 1865.	The whole act.
39 & 40 Vict. c. 56	Commons Act 1876	Commons Act 1876.	Section 24.
11 & 12 Geo. 5. c. 58	Trusts (Scotland) Act 1921	Trusts (Scotland) Act 1921.	In section 13, the words " with a rent under the powers of the Public Money Drainage Acts 1846 to 1856, or ".
1965 c. 2	Administration of Justice Act 1965	Administration of Justice Act 1965.	Section 28.
1965 c. 32	Administration of Estates (Small Payments) Act 1965	Administration of Estates (Small Payments) Act 1965.	In Schedule 1, in Part I, the entries relating to the Friendly Societies Act 1829 and the Army Pensions Act 1830.

==== Part XVII: University of London ====
Part XVII — University of London
Citation	Short title	Extent of repeal
17 & 18 Vict. c. 114	University of London Medical Graduates Act 1854	The whole act.
21 & 22 Vict. c. 90	Medical Act 1858	Section 53.
36 & 37 Vict. c. 55	Medical Act (University of London) 1873	The whole act.
61 & 62 Vict. c. 62	University of London Act 1898	The whole act.
62 & 63 Vict. c. 24	University of London Act 1899	The whole act.

==== Part XVIII: Weights and measures ====
Part XVIII — Weights and Measures
Citation	Short title	Extent of repeal
41 & 42 Vict. c. 49	Weights and Measures Act 1878	Section 62. The proviso to section 86, so far as unrepealed.
8 Edw. 7. c. 17	Cran Measures Act 1908	Section 9(1).
1963 c. 31	Weights and Measures Act 1963	In section 43(1), the words from " except " to " Board ". In section 60, paragraph (c) of subsection (1); and in paragraph (b) of subsection (3) the words from " and in " onwards. In section 62, subsections (4) and (5); and in subsection (6) the words " or (4) ". In Schedule 10, paragraph 12.

==== Part XIX: Miscellaneous ====
Part XIX — Miscellaneous
Citation	Short title	Description	Extent of repeal
8 Geo. 1. c. 28	Aberdeen Commissary Court Records Act 1721	An Act for supplying the records of the Commissary Court of Aberdeen, burnt or lost in the late fire there.	The whole act.
9 Geo. 1. c. 25	Aberdeen Records Act 1722	An Act for making more effectual [the Act 8 Geo. 1. c. 28].	The whole act.
9 Geo. 4. c. 39	Salmon Fisheries (Scotland) Act 1828	Salmon Fisheries (Scotland) Act 1828.	The whole act.
3 & 4 Vict. c. 2	Naturalization of Prince Albert (No. 2) Act 1840	An Act for the Naturalization of His Serene Highness Prince Albert of Saxe Coburg and Gotha.	The whole act.
19 & 20 Vict. c. 75	Customs Act 1856	An Act for the further alteration and amendment of the laws and duties of customs.	The whole act.
33 & 34 Vict. c. 13	Survey Act 1870	Survey Act 1870.	Section 5.
37 & 38 Vict. c. 88	Births and Deaths Registration Act 1874	Births and Deaths Registration Act 1874.	In section 51, the words " save as is herein otherwise expressly provided ". Schedule 4.
38 & 39 Vict. c. 55	Public Health Act 1875	Public Health Act 1875.	In Schedule 5, in Part III, the paragraph relating to section 38 of the Act 35 & 36 Vict. c. 79.
50 & 51 Vict. c. 70	Appellate Jurisdiction Act 1887	Appellate Jurisdiction Act 1887.	Section 2.
52 & 53 Vict. c. 24	Master and Servant Act 1889	Master and Servant Act 1889.	The whole act.
63 & 64 Vict. c. 15	Burial Act 1900	Burial Act 1900.	In Schedule 1, the entries relating to the Burial Acts of 1852, 1860 and 1871; in the entry relating to the Burial Act 1853, the reference to section 6; in the entry relating to the Burial Act 1855, the references to sections 3, 6, 7 and 17; and in the entry relating to the Burial Act 1857, the reference to section 9.
4 & 5 Geo. 5. c. 47	Deeds of Arrangement Act 1914	Deeds of Arrangement Act 1914.	Section 31.
12 & 13 Geo. 5. c. 50	Expiring Laws Act 1922	Expiring Laws Act 1922.	The whole act.
15 & 16 Geo. 5. c. 76	Expiring Laws Act 1925	Expiring Laws Act 1925.	The whole act.
16 & 17 Geo. 5. c. 18	Secretaries of State Act 1926	Secretaries of State Act 1926.	Section 2.
17 & 18 Geo. 5. c. 4	Royal and Parliamentary Titles Act 1927	Royal and Parliamentary Titles Act 1927.	In section 2(1), the words from " and accordingly " onwards.
2 & 3 Geo. 6. c. 70	Ships and Aircraft (Transfer Restriction) Act 1939	Ships and Aircraft (Transfer Restriction) Act 1939.	The whole act.
9 & 10 Geo. 6. c. 36	Statutory Instruments Act 1946	Statutory Instruments Act 1946.	Section 10(2).
11 & 12 Geo. 6. c. 29	National Assistance Act 1948	National Assistance Act 1948.	Sections 60(2) and 61(1). In Schedule 6, paragraphs 4, 5, 7(4), 12, 13, 17 and 19(3).
11 & 12 Geo. 6. c. 31	Cotton Spinning (Re-equipment Subsidy) Act 1948	Cotton Spinning (Re-equipment Subsidy) Act 1948.	The whole act, including that Act so far as applied by the Cotton Industry Act 1959.
12, 13 & 14 Geo. 6. c. 9	Prize Act 1948	Prize Act 1948.	The whole act.
14 & 15 Geo. 6. c. 39	Common Informers Act 1951	Common Informers Act 1951.	In the Schedule, the entry relating to the Metropolitan Police Courts Act 1839.
15 & 16 Geo. 6 & 1 Eliz. 2. c. 44	Customs and Excise Act 1952	Customs and Excise Act 1952.	In Schedule 10, in Part II, paragraph 4.
1 & 2 Eliz. 2. c. 18	Coastal Flooding (Emergency Provisions) Act 1953	Coastal Flooding (Emergency Provisions) Act 1953.	The whole act.
1 & 2 Eliz. 2. c. 20	Births and Deaths Registration Act 1953	Births and Deaths Registration Act 1953.	In Schedule 1, paragraph 1.
1 & 2 Eliz. 2. c. 37	Registration Service Act 1953	Registration Service Act 1953.	In Schedule 1, paragraphs 3, 6 and 9.
6 & 7 Eliz. 2. c. 51	Public Records Act 1958	Public Records Act 1958.	In Schedule 2, the entry relating to the Cotton Spinning (Re-equipment Subsidy) Act 1948.
6 & 7 Eliz. 2. c. 71	Agriculture Act 1958	Agriculture Act 1958.	In Schedule 1, paragraph 25. In Schedule 4, paragraphs 6, 7 and 8; in paragraph 9, the words " section twenty-six or ", where first occurring, and the words " the said section twenty-six or, as the case may be,"; and in paragraph 13, sub-paragraphs (d) and (e).
7 & 8 Eliz. 2. c. 19	Emergency Laws (Repeal) Act 1959	Emergency Laws (Repeal) Act 1959.	Sections 3 and 4.
7 & 8 Eliz. 2. c. 48	Cotton Industry Act 1959	Cotton Industry Act 1959.	The whole act.
8 & 9 Eliz. 2. c. 37	Payment of Wages Act 1960	Payment of Wages Act 1960.	In section 1(3), the proviso.
8 & 9 Eliz. 2. c. 57	Films Act 1960	Films Act 1960.	In Schedule 4, paragraphs 1, 2 and 5.
1964 c. 60	Emergency Laws (Re-enactments and Repeals) Act 1964	Emergency Laws (Re-enactments and Repeals) Act 1964.	Section 3. In section 14, the words " or section 3 ", wherever occurring. Section 16.
1968 c. 34	Agriculture (Miscellaneous Provisions) Act 1968	Agriculture (Miscellaneous Provisions) Act 1968.	Sections 10(7) and 11(9). Schedules 1 and 2.
1968 c. 54	Theatres Act 1968	Theatres Act 1968.	Section 19(2), (4), (5) and (6). In Schedule 2, in the entry relating to section 395 of the Burgh Police (Scotland) Act 1892, the words " the words ' stage plays or other ' shall be omitted;", and the words " and the words from ' without prejudice ' to the end shall be omitted "; in the entry relating to section 402 of that Act the words " the words ' stage plays or ' shall be omitted;"; and the entries relating to the Local Government (Scotland) Act 1947. Schedule 3.
1969 c. 48	Post Office Act 1969	Post Office Act 1969.	In Schedule 4, paragraphs 17, 20, 24, 50 and 93(1)(xiii).
1970 c. 31	Administration of Justice Act 1970	Administration of Justice Act 1970.	Section 2(5).
1974 c. 36	Mines (Working Facilities and Support) Act 1974	Mines (Working Facilities and Support) Act 1974.	Section 2.
1975 c. 24	House of Commons Disqualification Act 1975	House of Commons Disqualification Act 1975.	Section 10(2). Schedule 3.
1975 c. 25	Northern Ireland Assembly Disqualification Act 1975	Northern Ireland Assembly Disqualification Act 1975.	Section 5(2). Schedule 3.
1976 c. 16	Statute Law (Repeals) Act 1976	Statute Law (Repeals) Act 1976.	In Schedule 2, in Part I, the entry relating to the Licensing (Scotland) Act 1903; and in Part II, the entry relating to the Miscellaneous Financial Provisions Act 1955.

=== Short titles ===
Section 3 of, and schedule 3 to, the act authorised the citation by short titles of 8 acts passed between 1808 and 1868.

Citation	Short title	Title
48 Geo. 3. c. 73	Duchy of Lancaster Act 1808	An Act to improve the Land Revenue of the Crown in England, and also of His Majesty's Duchy of Lancaster.
57 Geo. 3. c. 97	Duchy of Lancaster Act 1817	An Act for ratifying Articles of Agreement entered into by the Right Honourable Henry Hall Viscount Gage, and the Commissioners of His Majesty's Woods, Forests and Land Revenues; and for the better Management and Improvement of the Land Revenues of the Crown.
59 Geo. 3. c. 86	Dean Forest Act 1819	An Act for the better Collection and Recovery of Gale Rents in the Forest of Dean, in the County of Gloucester.
1 & 2 Geo. 4. c. 52	Duchy of Lancaster Act 1821	An Act to improve the Land Revenues of the Crown, and of His Majesty's Duchy of Lancaster, and for making Provisions and Regulations for the better Management thereof.
6 & 7 Vict. c. 31	Chelsea Hospital Act 1843	An Act to enable the Commissioners of Chelsea Hospital to purchase certain Parcels of Land for the Benefit of the said Hospital, and for other Purposes.
22 & 23 Vict. c. 19	Universities of Oxford and Cambridge Act 1859	An Act to repeal Part of an Act passed in the Thirteenth Year of Elizabeth, Chapter Twenty-nine, concerning the several Incorporations of the Universities of Oxford and Cambridge, and the Confirmation of the Charters, Liberties, and Privileges granted to either of them.
24 & 25 Vict. c. 40	Dean Forest Act 1861	An Act to make further Provision for the Management of Her Majesty's Forest of Dean, and of the Mines and Quarries therein and in the Hundred of Saint Briavels in the County of Gloucester.
31 & 32 Vict. c. 35	Duchy of Cornwall Management Act 1868	An Act to extend the Provision in "The Duchy of Cornwall Management Act, 1863," relating to permanent Improvements.

== Subsequent developments ==
The entry relating to the Army Reserve Act 1962 (10 & 11 Eliz. 2. c. 10) in schedule 2 to the act was repealed by section 157(1)(b) of, and part II of schedule 10 to, the Reserve Forces Act 1980, which came into force on 20 April 1980.

Section 3 of, and schedule 3 to, the act were repealed by section 1(1) of, and part IX of schedule 1 to, the Statute Law (Repeals) Act 1995, which came into force on 8 November 1995.

Sections 1(1), 4(2) and in section 4(3), the words from "or the Isle of Man" to the end, and schedule 1 and the entries relating to the Highways Act 1959 (7 & 8 Eliz. 2. c. 25) and the Criminal Justice (Scotland) Act 1963 in schedule 2 to, the act were repealed by group 2 of part IX of schedule 1 to, the Statute Law (Repeals) Act 1998, which came into force on 19 November 1998. The orders in council made under section 4(3) have lapsed because of the repeal made to that section by the 1998 act.

== See also ==
- Statute Law (Repeals) Act
