= Duchy of Cornwall Management Act 1868 =

Act of the Parliament of the United Kingdom

Duchy of Cornwall Management Act 1868 (Note: The citation of this Act by this short title was authorised by section 3 of, and schedule 3 to, the Statute Law (Repeals) Act 1977. Due to the repeal of those provisions, it is now authorised by section 19(2) of the Interpretation Act 1978.)
- Act of Parliament
- Parliament of the United Kingdom
- Long title: An Act to extend the Provision in "The Duchy of Cornwall Management Act, 1863," relating to permanent Improvements.
- Citation: 31 & 32 Vict. c. 35
- Territorial extent: United Kingdom

Dates
- Royal assent: 25 June 1868
- Commencement: 25 June 1868 (Note: The Acts of Parliament (Commencement) Act 1793.)
Other legislation
| Amends | Duchy of Cornwall Management Act 1863 |
| Amended by | Duchy of Cornwall Management Act 1982 |

Status: Amended

Text of statute as originally enacted

Revised text of statute as amended

Text of the Duchy of Cornwall Management Act 1868 as in force today (including any amendments) within the United Kingdom, from legislation.gov.uk.

The Duchy of Cornwall Management Act 1868 (31 & 32 Vict. c. 35) is an act of the Parliament of the United Kingdom.

== Provisions ==
=== Section 2 – Capital funds of Duchy may be applied in improvement of house property, etc. ===
A sum need not be repaid under this section if the Treasury, on an application made by or on behalf of the Duke of Cornwall, notify him that, in their opinion, it is in all the circumstances to be regarded as a proper charge on capital. Such notification may be given in respect of the whole or any part of a particular advance or of the whole or any part of advances of a particular description.
