= List of acts of the Parliament of England from 1511 =

This is a list of acts of the Parliament of England for the year 1511.

For acts passed during the period 1707–1800, see the list of acts of the Parliament of Great Britain. See also the list of acts of the Parliament of Scotland, and the list of acts of the Parliament of Ireland.

For acts passed from 1801 onwards, see the list of acts of the Parliament of the United Kingdom. For acts of the devolved parliaments and assemblies in the United Kingdom, see the list of acts of the Scottish Parliament, the list of acts of the Northern Ireland Assembly, and the list of acts and measures of Senedd Cymru; see also the list of acts of the Parliament of Northern Ireland.

For medieval statutes, etc. that are not considered to be acts of Parliament, see the list of English statutes.

See also the List of ordinances and acts of the Parliament of England, 1642–1660 for ordinances and acts passed by the Long Parliament and other bodies without royal assent, and which were not considered to be valid legislation following the Restoration in 1660.

The number shown after each act's title is its chapter number. Acts are cited using this number, preceded by the years of the reign during which the relevant parliamentary session was held; thus the Union with Ireland Act 1800 is cited as "39 & 40 Geo. 3. c. 67", meaning the 67th act passed during the session that started in the 39th year of the reign of George III and which finished in the 40th year of that reign. The modern convention is to use Arabic numerals in citations (thus "41 Geo. 3" rather than "41 Geo. III"). Acts of the last session of the Parliament of Great Britain and the first session of the Parliament of the United Kingdom are both cited as "41 Geo. 3".

Acts passed by the Parliament of England did not have a short title; however, some of these acts have subsequently been given a short title by acts of the Parliament of the United Kingdom, such as the Short Titles Act 1896 (59 & 60 Vict. c. 14).

Acts passed by the Parliament of England were deemed to have come into effect on the first day of the session in which they were passed. Because of this, the years given in the list below may in fact be the year before a particular act was passed.

== 3 Hen. 8 ==
The first session of the 2nd Parliament of King Henry VIII, which met from 4 February 1512 until 30 March 1512.

This session was also traditionally cited as 3 H. 8.

Note that cc. 16–23 were traditionally cited as private acts cc. 1–8.

Short title	Citation	Royal assent
Long title
Exportation Act 1511 (repealed)	3 Hen. 8. c. 1	30 March 1512
An Act against carrying out of this Realm Coin, Plate, &c. (Repealed by Statute Law Revision Act 1863 (26 & 27 Vict. c. 125))
Escheators Act 1511 (repealed)	3 Hen. 8. c. 2	30 March 1512
An Act concerning Escheators and Commissioners. (Repealed by Statute Law Revision Act 1863 (26 & 27 Vict. c. 125))
Archery Act 1511 (repealed)	3 Hen. 8. c. 3	30 March 1512
An Act concerning shooting in Long Bows. (Repealed by Statute Law Revision Act 1863 (26 & 27 Vict. c. 125))
Service in War Act 1511 (repealed)	3 Hen. 8. c. 4	30 March 1512
An Act of Privilege for such Persons as are in the King's Wars. (Repealed by Statute Law Revision Act 1863 (26 & 27 Vict. c. 125))
Soldiers Act 1511 (repealed)	3 Hen. 8. c. 5	30 March 1512
An Act against such Captains as abridge their Soldiers of their Pay. (Repealed by Statute Law Revision Act 1863 (26 & 27 Vict. c. 125))
Woollen Cloth Act 1511 (repealed)	3 Hen. 8. c. 6	30 March 1512
An Act against deceitful making of Woollen Cloth. (Repealed by Statute Law Revision Act 1863 (26 & 27 Vict. c. 125))
Exportation Act 1511 (repealed)	3 Hen. 8. c. 7	30 March 1512
An Act against carrying Cloths over Sea unshorn. (Repealed by Repeal of Acts Concerning Importation Act 1822 (3 Geo. 4. c. 41))
Assize of Victuals Act 1511 (repealed)	3 Hen. 8. c. 8	30 March 1512
An Act concerning the assizing and setting of Prices of Victuals. (Repealed by Statute Law Revision Act 1863 (26 & 27 Vict. c. 125))
Visors Act 1511 (repealed)	3 Hen. 8. c. 9	30 March 1512
An Act against disguised Persons and wearing of Visours. (Repealed by Statute Law Revision Act 1863 (26 & 27 Vict. c. 125))
Leather Act 1511 (repealed)	3 Hen. 8. c. 10	30 March 1512
An Act against buying of Leather out of the open Market, being not well tanned, or unsealed. (Repealed by Statute Law Revision Act 1863 (26 & 27 Vict. c. 125))
Physicians and Surgeons Act 1511 (repealed)	3 Hen. 8. c. 11	30 March 1512
An Act concerning Physicians and Surgeons. (Repealed by Statute Law Revision Act 1948 (11 & 12 Geo. 6. c. 62))
Juries Act 1511 (repealed)	3 Hen. 8. c. 12	30 March 1512
An Act against Sheriffs for Abuses. (Repealed by Juries Act 1825 (6 Geo. 4. c. 50))
Cross-bows Act 1511 (repealed)	3 Hen. 8. c. 13	30 March 1512
An Act against shooting in Cross-bows. (Repealed by Statute Law Revision Act 1863 (26 & 27 Vict. c. 125))
Oils Act 1511 (repealed)	3 Hen. 8. c. 14	30 March 1512
An Act for the searching of Oils within the City of London. (Repealed by Repeal of Obsolete Statutes Act 1856 (19 & 20 Vict. c. 64))
Hats and Caps Act 1511 (repealed)	3 Hen. 8. c. 15	30 March 1512
An Act concerning Hats and Caps. (Repealed by Continuance, etc. of Laws Act 1603 (1 Jas. 1. c. 25), confirmed by Repeal of Acts Concerning Importation Act 1822 (3 Geo. 4. c. 41))
Estates of Earl of Surrey Act 1511 (repealed)	3 Hen. 8. c. 16 (Note: This is the citation in The Statutes of the Realm.); 3 Hen. 8. c. 1 Pr. (Note: This is the citation in The Statutes at Large.)	30 March 1512
My Lorde of Surreys Acte. (Repealed by Statute Law (Repeals) Act 1978 (c. 45))
Restitution of Lord Audley and others Act 1511 (repealed)	3 Hen. 8. c. 17; 3 Hen. 8. c. 2 Pr.	30 March 1512
This is the restitucion of the Lorde Audeley. (Repealed by Statute Law (Repeals) Act 1977 (c. 18))
Grant to William Compton Act 1511 (repealed)	3 Hen. 8. c. 18; 3 Hen. 8. c. 3 Pr.	30 March 1512
This is an Acte concnynge Willm Compton for certeyn landes pteyning to John Risley Knyght. (Repealed by Statute Law (Repeals) Act 1978 (c. 45))
Restitution of John Dudley Act 1511 (repealed)	3 Hen. 8. c. 19; 3 Hen. 8. c. 4 Pr.	30 March 1512
This is an Acte of Restitucion of theires of Ed. Dudley uppon thatteyndour of the seid Ed. (Repealed by Statute Law (Repeals) Act 1977 (c. 18))
Restitution of Thomas Herte Act 1511 (repealed)	3 Hen. 8. c. 20; 3 Hen. 8. c. 5 Pr.	30 March 1512
This is an Acte of Restitucion of Th. Harte. (Repealed by Statute Law (Repeals) Act 1977 (c. 18))
Restitution of Elizabeth Martyn Act 1511 (repealed)	3 Hen. 8. c. 21; 3 Hen. 8. c. 6 Pr.	30 March 1512
This is an Acte of restitucion to Elisabeth Marten. (Repealed by Statute Law (Repeals) Act 1977 (c. 18))
Taxation Act 1511 (repealed)	3 Hen. 8. c. 22; 3 Hen. 8. c. 7 Pr.	30 March 1512
Subsydy. (Repealed by Statute Law Revision Act 1863 (26 & 27 Vict. c. 125))
Surveyors of Crown Lands, etc. Act 1511 (repealed)	3 Hen. 8. c. 23; 3 Hen. 8. c. 8 Pr.	30 March 1512
Ꝑ Roƀto Southwell Militie & Bartħo Westby. (Repealed by Statute Law Revision Act 1863 (26 & 27 Vict. c. 125))

=== Sources ===
- "3° Hen. VIII". The Statutes of the Realm. Vol. 3: 1509 to 1547. pp. 23–47 – via HathiTrust.
- "3° Hen. VIII". The Statutes of the Realm. Vol. 3: 1509 to 1547. pp. 23–47 – via Google Books.
- "Anno tertio Henrici VIII". The Statutes at Large. Vol. 4 - 1 Richard III to 31 Henry VIII - 1483-4 to 1539. pp. 111–119 – via Internet Archive.
- "Anno tertio Henrici VIII". The Statutes at Large. Vol. 4 - 1 Richard III to 31 Henry VIII - 1483-4 to 1539. pp. 111–119 – via Internet Archive.
- "Anno tertio Henrici VIII". The Statutes at Large. Vol. 4 - 1 Richard III to 31 Henry VIII - 1483-4 to 1539. pp. 111–119 – via Internet Archive.
- Journal of the House of Lords. Vol. 1: 1509-1577. London: His Majesty's Stationery Office. 1830 – via British History Online.
- Chronological Table of and Index to the Statutes. Vol. 1: To the End of the Session 59 Vict. Sess. 2 (1895) (13th ed.). London: Her Majesty's Stationery Office. 1896. p. 44 – via Google Books.
- Chronological Table of the Statutes: Covering the Period from 1235 to the End of 1971. London: Her Majesty's Stationery Office. 1972. pp. 38–39. ISBN 978-0-11-840096-1 – via Google Books.

== See also ==
- List of acts of the Parliament of England
