= Duchy of Lancaster Act 1812 =

Act of the Parliament of the United Kingdom

Duchy of Lancaster Act 1812 (Note: The citation of this act by this short title was authorised by section 5 of, and the second schedule to, the Statute Law Revision Act 1948. Due to the repeal of those provisions, it is now authorised by section 19(2) of the Interpretation Act 1978.)
- Act of Parliament
- Parliament of the United Kingdom
- Long title: An Act for enabling His Majesty to grant leases under certain circumstances, and for the better carrying into Effect the Provisions of an Act passed in the Thirty ninth and Fortieth Year of the Reign of His present Majesty, touching the Formation of a Map of the New Forest in the County of Southampton, and continuing and extending other Provisions of the said Act; for further appropriating the Monies arisen or to arise from the Sale of certain Crown Lands under the Authority of divers Acts of Parliament; for annexing certain Lands within the Forest of Rockingham to His Majesty's Manor of King's Cliffe; and for enabling the Commissioners of the Treasury to appropriate small portions of land for ecclesiastical purposes. (Note: These words are printed against this act in the second column of the second schedule to the Statute Law Revision Act 1948, which is headed "Title".)
- Citation: 52 Geo. 3. c. 161
- Territorial extent: United Kingdom

Dates
- Royal assent: 29 July 1812
- Commencement: 29 July 1812 (Note: The Acts of Parliament (Commencement) Act 1793.)
Other legislation
Amended by	Dean Forest Act 1819; Crown Lands Act 1829; Duchy of Lancaster Act 1988

Status: Amended

Text of statute as originally enacted

Revised text of statute as amended

Text of the Duchy of Lancaster Act 1812 as in force today (including any amendments) within the United Kingdom, from legislation.gov.uk.

The Duchy of Lancaster Act 1812 (52 Geo. 3. c. 161) is an act of the Parliament of the United Kingdom.

As of 2025, the act was partly in force in the United Kingdom.

== Subsequent developments ==
The whole act was repealed, excepting so far as any powers, provisions, matters or things related to or affected the Duchy of Lancaster or any of the hereditaments, possessions or property within the ordering and survey of the Duchy of Lancaster, by section 1 of the Crown Lands Act 1829 (10 Geo. 4. c. 50).

Sections 1 and 3 of the act were repealed by section 1(4) of, and the schedule to, the Duchy of Lancaster Act 1988, which came into force on 3 May 1988.
