= Duchy of Lancaster Act 1821 =

Act of the Parliament of the United Kingdom

Duchy of Lancaster Act 1821 (Note: The citation of this act by this short title was authorised by section 3 of, and schedule 3 to, the Statute Law (Repeals) Act 1977. Due to the repeal of those provisions, it is now authorised by section 19(2) of the Interpretation Act 1978.)
- Act of Parliament
- Parliament of the United Kingdom
- Long title: An Act to improve the Land Revenues of the Crown, and of His Majesty's Duchy of Lancaster, and for making Provisions and Regulations for the better Management thereof.
- Citation: 1 & 2 Geo. 4. c. 52
- Territorial extent: United Kingdom

Dates
- Royal assent: 15 June 1821
- Commencement: 15 June 1821 (Note: The Acts of Parliament (Commencement) Act 1793.)
- Repealed: 1 July 1971
Other legislation
Amended by	Crown Lands Act 1829
Repealed by	Statute Law Revision Act 1873; Wild Creatures and Forest Laws Act 1971

Status: Repealed

Text of statute as originally enacted

The Duchy of Lancaster Act 1821 (1 & 2 Geo. 4. c. 52) was an act of the Parliament of the United Kingdom. It was a public general Act. The unrepealed residue of the act was omitted from the third revised edition of the statutes because of its local and personal nature.

== Subsequent developments ==
The whole act was repealed, excepting so far as any powers, provisions, matters or things related to or affected the Duchy of Lancaster or any of the hereditaments, possessions or property within the ordering and survey of the Duchy of Lancaster, by section 1 of the Crown Lands Act 1829 (10 Geo. 4. c. 50).

The whole act, except sections 12 and 13 so far as they related to the Duchy of Lancaster, was repealed by section 1 of, and the schedule to, the Statute Law Revision Act 1873 (36 & 37 Vict. c. 91), which came into force on 5 August 1873.

Sections 12 and 13 of the act were repealed by section 1(4) of, and the schedule to, the Wild Creatures and Forest Laws Act 1971, which came into force on 1 July 1971.
