= Administration of Justice (Emergency Provisions) Act 1939 =

Act of the Parliament of the United Kingdom

Administration of Justice (Emergency Provisions) Act 1939 (Note: Section 12(1).)
- Act of Parliament
- Parliament of the United Kingdom
- Long title: An Act to provide for the modification of the law relating to the administration of justice in the event of the outbreak or probability of war, and for purposes connected therewith.
- Citation: 2 & 3 Geo. 6. c. 78
- Introduced by: Terence O'Connor (Commons); Frederic Maugham, Baron Maugham (Lords)
- Territorial extent: England and Wales (Note: Section 12(2).)

Dates
- Royal assent: 1 September 1939
- Commencement: various (Note: Section 11(1).)
- Repealed: 10 March 1947
Other legislation
Repealed by	Administration of Justice (Emergency Provisions) Act (Expiry) Order 1947

Status: Repealed

Text of statute as originally enacted

The Administration of Justice (Emergency Provisions) Act 1939 (2 & 3 Geo. 6. c. 78) was an act of the Parliament of the United Kingdom that modified the law in England and Wales with regards to juries in England and Wales.

The act was an emergency measure passed in anticipation of war with Germany, and received royal assent on the day that Germany invaded Poland, beginning the Second World War. Among other things, it reduced the number of people required to serve on a jury in civil or criminal cases from twelve to seven (except in the most serious criminal cases). It also raised the age limit for jury service from 60 to 65, and abolished trial by jury in civil cases, except in cases where the judge ordered that a jury trial was to take place. This was due to the large numbers of people who were expected to be conscripted in the event of a war. The Act was to have effect until the end of the war, when it would be expired by an Order in Council. In the event, the Administration of Justice (Emergency Provisions) Act (Expiry) Order 1947 was made on 10 March 1947.

Similar legislation was passed for Scotland and Northern Ireland. In Scotland, where a unanimous verdict was not always required, a majority verdict could be given by five of the seven jurors.

== Selected text ==
Section 7(1) read:

"Notwithstanding anything in any enactment, for the purpose of any trial with a jury or inquiry by a jury in any proceedings, whether civil or criminal, it shall not be necessary for the jury to consist of more than seven persons:
"Provided that the preceding provisions of this subsection shall not apply in relation to the trial of a person on any charge, if the court or a judge thinks fit, by reason of the gravity of the matters in issue, to direct that those provisions shall not apply, and shall not in any case apply in relation to the trial of a person on a charge of treason or murder."

Section 8(1) read:

"No question arising in any civil proceedings in the High Court or in any inferior court of civil jurisdiction shall be tried with a jury, and no writ of enquiry for the assessment of damages or other claim by a jury shall issue, unless the court or a judge is of opinion that the question ought to be tried with a jury or, as the case may be, the assessment ought to be made by a jury and makes an order to that effect."

== Preparation and parliamentary passage ==
A draft bill was prepared in February 1939 by a sub-committee of the Committee of Imperial Defence. The Administration of Justice (Emergency Provisions) Bill was introduced into the House of Lords on 9 May 1939. Introducing the second reading debate on 16 May, the Lord Chancellor Frederic Maugham suggested it was "designed to enable the Courts to function in case of the outbreak of war. It will come into force only on the making of an Order in Council on the ground of the outbreak or probability of war." Following Germany's invasion of Poland on 1 September 1939, the Bill was one of a number of pieces of emergency legislation to be introduced into the House of Commons. The second reading debate began at 11:17pm and the Bill passed all Parliamentary stages the same day.

== See also ==
- National Service (Armed Forces) Act 1939
