= Crown Lands Act 1829 =

Act of the Parliament of the United Kingdom

Crown Lands Act 1829 (Note: The citation of this act by this short title was authorised by section 1 of, and the first schedule to, the Short Titles Act 1896. Due to the repeal of those provisions it is now authorised by section 19(2) of the Interpretation Act 1978.)
- Act of Parliament
- Parliament of the United Kingdom
- Long title: An Act to consolidate and amend the Laws relating to the Management and Improvement of His Majesty's Woods, Forests, Parks, and Chases; of the Land Revenue of the Crown within the Survey of the Exchequer in England; and of the Land Revenue of the Crown in Ireland; and for extending certain Provisions relating to the same to the Isles of Man and Alderney.
- Citation: 10 Geo. 4. c. 50
- Territorial extent: United Kingdom

Dates
- Royal assent: 19 June 1829
- Commencement: 19 June 1829 (Note: The Acts of Parliament (Commencement) Act 1793.)
- Repealed: 1 July 1971
Other legislation
Amends	See § Repealed enactments
Repeals/revokes	See § Repealed enactments
Amended by	Crown Lands Act 1845
Repealed by	Statute Law Revision (No. 2) Act 1888; Statute Law Revision Act 1890; Statute Law Revision (No. 2) Act 1890; Forgery Act 1913; Statute Law Revision Act 1953; Statute Law Revision Act 1958; Crown Estate Act 1961; Wild Creatures and Forest Laws Act 1971
Relates to	Crown Lands (Scotland) Act 1835

Status: Repealed

Text of statute as originally enacted

The Crown Lands Act 1829 (10 Geo. 4. c. 50) was an act of the Parliament of the United Kingdom that consolidated enactments relating to crown lands in the United Kingdom.

The act redefined the powers and duties of the Commissioners of Woods, Forests and Land Revenues.

== Provisions ==
Section 1 of the act repealed 17 enactments, excepting so far as any powers, provisions, matters or things related to or affected the Duchy of Lancaster or any of the hereditaments, possessions or property within the ordering and survey of the Duchy of Lancaster.

Citation	Short title	Description	Extent of repeal
34 Geo. 3. c. 75	Crown Land Revenues Act 1794	An Act passed in the Thirty-fourth Year of the Reign of His late Majesty King George the Third, intituled An Act for the better Management of the Land Revenue of the Crown, and for the Sale of Fee farm and other unimprovable Rents	The whole act.
46 Geo. 3. c. 142	Woods and Forests Act 1806	An Act passed in the Forty-sixth Year of the Reign of His late Majesty King George the Third, intituled An Act for the better Regulation of the Office of Surveyor General of Woods and Forests.	The whole act.
46 Geo. 3. c. 151	Crown Lands Act 1806	An Act passed in the Forty- sixth Year of the Reign of His late Majesty King George the Third, intituled An Act to enable His Majesty to grant new Leases on former Rents, for the Benefit of Charitable Institutions or Augmentation of Ecclesiastical Corporations.	The whole act.
48 Geo. 3. c. 73	Duchy of Lancaster Act 1808	An Act passed in the Forty- eighth Year of the Reign of His late Majesty King George the Third, intituled An Act to improve the Land Revenue of the Crown in England, and also of His Majesty's Duchy of Lancaster.	The whole act.
50 Geo. 3. c. 65	Crown Lands Act 1810	An Act passed in the Fiftieth Year of the Reign of His late Majesty King George the Third, intituled An Act for uniting the Offices of Surveyor General of the Land Revenue of the Crown and Surveyor General of His Majesty's Woods, Forests, Parks, and Chases.	The whole act.
52 Geo. 3. c. 161	Duchy of Lancaster Act 1812	An Act passed in the Fifty-second Year of the Reign of His late Majesty King George the Third, intituled An Act for enabling His Majesty to grant Leases under certain Circumstances ; and for the better carrying into Effect the Provisions of an Act passed in the Thirty-ninth and Fortieth Years of the Reign of His present Majesty, touching the Formation of a Map of the New Forest in the County of Southampton, and continuing and extending the Provisions of the said Act ; for further appropriating Monies arisen and to arise from the Sale of certain Crown Lands under the Authority of divers Acts of Parliament ; for annexing certain Lands within the Forest of Rockingham to His Majesty's Manor ofKing's Cliffe ; and for enabling the Commissioners of the Treasury to appropriate small Portions of Land to Ecclesiastical Purposes.	The whole act.
54 Geo. 3. c. 70	Crown Lands Act 1814	An Act passed in the Fifty-fourth Year of the Reign of His late Majesty King George the Third, intituled An Act for the further Improvement of the Land Revenues of the Crown.	The whole act.
55 Geo. 3. c. 55	Land Revenue of the Crown Act 1815	An Act passed in the Fifty-fifth Year of the Reign of His late Majesty King George the Third, intituled An Act to enable the Commissioners of His Majesty's Woods, Forests, and Land Revenues to contract for the Purchase and Surrender of Crown Leases and to sell His Majesty's Interest in the Thornhill Estate, in the Parish of Stallbridge in the County of Dorset, and in certain small Parcels of Land belonging to His Majesty's Subjects within the Royal Forests ; and to remove Doubts as to Estates of the Crown, sold by Order of the said Commissioners, being exempted from the Auction Duty.	The whole act.
56 Geo. 3. c. 16	Receiver of Crown Rents Act 1816	An Act passed in the Fifty-sixth Year of the Reign of His late Majesty King George the Third, intituled An Act for better regulating the Offices of Receivers of Crown Rents.	The whole act.
57 Geo. 3. c. 61	Abolition of Certain Officers of Royal Forests Act 1817	An Act passed in the Fifty-seventh Year of the Reign of His said late Majesty King George the Third, intituled An Act to abolish the Offices of the Wardens, Chief Justices, and Justices in Eyre, North and South of Trent.	The whole act.
57 Geo. 3. c. 97	Duchy of Lancaster Act 1817	An Act passed in the Fifty-seventh Year of the Reign of His late Majesty King George the Third, intituled An Act for ratifying Articles of Agreement entered into by the Right Honourable Henry Hall Viscount Gage and the Commissioners of His Majesty's Woods, Forests, and Land Revenues; and for the better Management and Improvement of the Land Revenues of the Crown.	The whole act.
1 Geo. 4. c. 71	Crown Lands Act 1820	An Act passed in the First Year of the Reign of His present Majesty, intituled An Act to enlarge the Time and Powers of carrying the New Street Act into Execution, and to extend the Provisions of an Act for ratifying an Agreement made with Lord Gage; and for the better Management and Improvement of the Land Revenues of the Crown.	The whole act.
1 & 2 Geo. 4. c. 52	Duchy of Lancaster Act 1821	An Act passed in the First and Second Years of the Reign of His present Majesty, intituled An Act to improve the Land Revenues of the Crown, and of His Majesty's Duchy of Lancaster, and for making Provisions and Regulations for the better Management thereof.	The whole act.
5 Geo. 4. c. 48	Crown Lands Act 1824	An Act passed in the Fifth Year of the Reign of His present Majesty, intituled An Act to enable the Commissioners of His Majesty's Treasury to sell out certain Bank Annuities now standing in their Names, and to apply the Produce thereof in Part Payment of a Loan of Three hundred thousand Pounds due to the Royal Exchange Assurance Company; and to facilitate the Sale of Fee-farm Rents, and of small Portions of the Land Revenues of the Crown; and for other Purposes.	The whole act.
6 Geo. 4. c. 77	Buckingham Palace Act 1825	An Act passed in the Sixth Year of the Reign of His present Majesty, intituled An Act to authorize the Application of Part of the Land Revenue of the Crown for the Repair and Improvement of Buckingham House.	The whole act.
7 & 8 Geo. 4. c. 66	Crown Lands Act 1827	An Act passed in the Seventh and Eighth Years of the Reign of His present Majesty, intituled An Act to extend an Act of the Fifty-sixth Year of His late Majesty, for enabling His Majesty to grant small Portions of Land as Sites for Public Buildings, or to be used as Cemeteries.	The whole act.
7 & 8 Geo. 4. c. 68	Crown Lands (Ireland) Act 1827	An Act passed in the Seventh and Eighth Years of the Reign of His present Majesty, intituled An Act for the Management and Improvement of the Land Revenues of the Crown in Ireland, and for other Purposes relating thereto.	The whole act.

== Subsequent developments ==
The savings in section 1 of the act for the Duchy of Lancaster meant that acts repealed by this act were repealed by subsequent Statute Law Revision Acts, including:

- The Statute Law Revision Act 1861 (24 & 25 Vict. c. 101)
- The Statute Law Revision Act 1872 (No. 2) (35 & 36 Vict. c. 97)
- The Statute Law Revision Act 1873 (36 & 37 Vict. c. 91)

The following enactments were repealed by section 1 of, and the first schedule to, the Statute Law Revision Act 1953 (2 & 3 Eliz. 2. c. 5), which came into force on 18 December 1953.

- In section 35, the words " under their hands and seals "; the words " conveyance and " where secondly occurring, and the words " execution and ".
- In section 42, the words " shall be attested as to the execution thereof by the said Commissioners, by at least one witness, and ". In section fifty-two, the words " or any copyhold lands or hereditaments the freehold of which shall be in the crown " and the words " pensions, annuities,".
- Section 59.
- Section 69.
- In section 110, the words " so much of " where first occurring, the words from " as shall have become due " to " Isle of Alderney " and the words from " in England and Wales " to the end of the section.
- Section 114.
- Section 123.

Sections 5, 39, 53–56, 90, 106, 128 and 129 of the act were repealed by section 2 of, and the second schedule to, the Statute Law Revision Act 1958 (6 & 7 Eliz. 2. c. 46), which came into force on 23 July 1958.

The whole act, so far as unrepealed, was repealed by section 1(4) of, and the schedule to, the Wild Creatures and Forest Laws Act 1971, which came into force on 1 July 1971.
