= Quakers and Moravians Act 1833 =

Act of the Parliament of the United Kingdom

Quakers and Moravians Act 1833 (Note: The citation of this act by this short title was authorised by section 1 of, and the first schedule to, the Short Titles Act 1896. Due to the repeal of those provisions it is now authorised by section 19(2) of the Interpretation Act 1978.)
- Act of Parliament
- Parliament of the United Kingdom
- Long title: An Act to allow Quakers and Moravians to make Affirmation in all Cases where an Oath is or shall be required.
- Citation: 3 & 4 Will. 4. c. 49
- Territorial extent: United Kingdom

Dates
- Royal assent: 28 August 1833
- Commencement: 28 August 1833 (Note: The Acts of Parliament (Commencement) Act 1793.)
- Repealed: 16 June 1977
Other legislation
Amended by	Quakers and Moravians Act 1838; Promissory Oaths Act 1871; Perjury Act 1911; False Oaths (Scotland) Act 1933
Repealed by	Statute Law (Repeals) Act 1977

Status: Repealed

Text of statute as originally enacted

The Quakers and Moravians Act 1833 (3 & 4 Will. 4. c. 49) was an act of the Parliament of the United Kingdom.

The act allowed Quaker and Moravian MPs to substitute an affirmation for an oath on their entrance to the House of Commons.

== Subsequent developments ==
Section 2 of the act was repealed by section 1 of, and part II of schedule one to, the Promissory Oaths Act 1871 (34 & 35 Vict. c. 48), which came into force on 13 July 1871.

The whole act was repealed by section 1(1) of, and part XIV of schedule 1 to, the Statute Law (Repeals) Act 1977, which came into force on 16 June 1977.

== Notes ==
.
