= Quakers and Moravians Act 1838 =

Act of the Parliament of the United Kingdom

Quakers and Moravians Act 1838 (Note: The citation of this act by this short title was authorised by section 1 of, and the first schedule to, the Short Titles Act 1896. Due to the repeal of those provisions it is now authorised by section 19(2) of the Interpretation Act 1978.)
- Act of Parliament
- Parliament of the United Kingdom
- Long title: An Act for permitting Affirmation to be made instead of an Oath in certain Cases.
- Citation: 1 & 2 Vict. c. 77
- Territorial extent: United Kingdom; British Empire

Dates
- Royal assent: 10 August 1838
- Commencement: 10 August 1838 (Note: The Acts of Parliament (Commencement) Act 1793.)
- Repealed: 16 June 1977
Other legislation
Amends	Quakers and Moravians Act 1833
Amended by	False Oaths (Scotland) Act 1933
Repealed by	Statute Law (Repeals) Act 1977

Status: Repealed

Text of statute as originally enacted

The Quakers and Moravians Act 1838 (1 & 2 Vict. c. 77) was an act of the Parliament of the United Kingdom, signed into law on 10 August 1838. Prior to the passing of the act, Quakers and Moravians had been able to give an affirmation in lieu of an oath where one was required; for example, when giving evidence in court. This Act extended that privilege to those who were previously members of these groups and had seceded from them, retaining the conscientious objection to oaths. Any person choosing to make an affirmation under the act was required to give a declaration to that extent, and would remain subject to the normal penalties of perjury for falsehood.

== Subsequent developments ==
The whole act was repealed by section 1(1) of, and part XIV of schedule 1 to, the Statute Law (Repeals) Act 1977, which came into force on 16 June 1977.

== Bibliography ==
- The British almanac of the Society for the Diffusion of Useful Knowledge, for the year 1839. The Society for the Diffusion of Useful Knowledge, London, 1839.
