= Tithe Act =

Stock short title used in UK legislation

Tithe Act is a stock short title used in the United Kingdom for legislation relating to tithes.

== List ==
- The Tithe Act 1536 (28 Hen. 8. c. 11)
- The Tithe Act 1540 (32 Hen. 8. c. 7)
- The Tithe Annuities Apportionment Act 1921 (11 & 12 Geo. 5. c. 20)

The Tithe Acts 1836 to 1891 is the collective title of the following Acts:

- The Tithe Act 1836 (6 & 7 Will. 4. c. 71)
- The Tithe Act 1837 (7 Will. 4 & 1 Vict. c. 69)
- The Tithe Act 1838 (1 & 2 Vict. c. 64)
- The Tithe Act 1839 (2 & 3 Vict. c. 62)
- The Tithe Act 1840 (3 & 4 Vict. c. 15)
- The Tithe Act 1842 (5 & 6 Vict. c. 54)
- The Tithe Act 1846 (9 & 10 Vict. c. 73)
- The Tithe Act 1847 (10 & 11 Vict. c. 104)
- The Tithe Act 1860 (23 & 24 Vict. c. 93)
- The Inclosure, &c. Expenses Act 1868 (31 & 32 Vict. c. 89)
- The Tithe Act 1878 (41 & 42 Vict. c. 42)
- The Tithe Rentcharge Redemption Act 1885 (48 & 49 Vict. c. 32)
- The Extraordinary Tithe Redemption Act 1886 (49 & 50 Vict. c. 54)
- The Tithe Act 1891 (54 & 55 Vict. c. 8)

The Tithe Acts 1836 to 1918 was the collective title of the Tithe Act 1918 (8 & 9 Geo. 5. c. 54) and Tithe Acts 1836 to 1891.

The Tithe Acts 1836 to 1925 was the collective title of the Tithe Act 1925 (15 & 16 Geo. 5. c. 87) and the Tithe Acts 1836 to 1918.

The Tithe Acts 1836 to 1936 is the collective title of the Tithe Act 1936 (26 Geo. 5 & 1 Edw. 8. c. 43) and the Tithe Acts 1836 to 1925.

The Tithe Acts 1836 to 1951 is the collective title of the Tithe Act 1951 (14 & 15 Geo. 6. c. 62) and the Tithe Acts 1836 to 1936.

The Tithe Acts 1936 and 1951 is the collective title of the Tithe Act 1936 and the Tithe Act 1951.

== See also ==
- List of short titles
