= Attainder of the Earl of Kildare Act 1536 =

Act of the Parliament of England

- Act of Parliament
- Parliament of England
- Long title: An Acte concernyng the Attaynder of Thomas Fittzgaralde and of his v. Uncles.
- Citation: 28 Hen. 8. c. 18
- Territorial extent: England and Wales

Dates
- Royal assent: 18 July 1536
- Commencement: 8 June 1536 (Note: Start of session.)
- Repealed: 16 June 1977

Other legislation
- Repealed by: Statute Law (Repeals) Act 1977
- Relates to: Attainder of the Earl of Kildare Act 1534; Treason Act 1536

Status: Repealed

Text of statute as originally enacted

The Attainder of the Earl of Kildare Act 1536 (28 Hen. 8. c. 18) was an act of the Parliament of England. The act was a bill of attainder to authorise the execution of the 10th Earl of Kildare, his uncles and Archdeacon Charles Reynolds, for treason.

== Subsequent developments ==
The whole act was repealed by section 1(1) of, and part IV of schedule 1 to, the Statute Law (Repeals) Act 1977, which came into force on 16 June 1977.

== See also ==
- Treason Act 1536
- High treason in the United Kingdom
