= Ecclesiastical Commission =

The term Ecclesiastical Commission may refer to the following:

- The Ecclesiastical Commission established in 1835 by the Church of England, replacing the Ecclesiastical Revenues Commission.
- An Ecclesiastical Commission being a committee of Roman Catholic clergymen tasked with certain tasks.
