= Tithe Act 1540 =

Act of the Parliament of England

Tithe Act 1540 (Note: The citation of this act by this short title was authorised by section 5 of, and the second schedule to, the Statute Law Revision Act 1948. Due to the repeal of those provisions, it is now authorised by section 19(2) of the Interpretation Act 1978.)
- Act of Parliament
- Parliament of England
- Long title: Payment of tithes and offeringes. (Note: These words are printed against this act in the second column of the second schedule to the Statute Law Revision Act 1948, which is headed "Title".)
- Citation: 32 Hen. 8. c. 7
- Territorial extent: England and Wales

Dates
- Royal assent: 24 July 1540
- Commencement: 12 April 1540 (Note: Start of session.)
- Repealed: 1 January 1970
Other legislation
Repealed by	Statute Law Revision Act 1887; Ecclesiastical Jurisdiction Measure 1963; Statute Law (Repeals) Act 1969
Relates to	Tithe Act 1536

Status: Repealed

Text of statute as originally enacted

The Tithe Act 1540 (32 Hen. 8. c. 7) was an act of the Parliament of England.

== Subsequent developments ==
The whole act, except as to tithes, offerings and duties which had not been commuted or were otherwise still payable, and except section 5, was repealed by section 1 of, and the schedule to, the Statute Law Revision Act 1887 (50 & 51 Vict. c. 59), which came into force on 16 September 1887.

The proviso to section 5 of the act was repealed by section 87 of, and the fifth schedule to, the Ecclesiastical Jurisdiction Measure 1963 (No. 1), which came into force on 1 March 1965.

Section 5 of the act, so far as unrepealed, was repealed by section 1 of, and part II of the schedule to, the Statute Law (Repeals) Act 1969, which came into force on 1 January 1970.

== See also ==
- Tithe Act
