= Parochial Libraries Act 1708 =

Act of the Parliament of Great Britain

Parochial Libraries Act 1708 (Note: The citation of this act by this short title was authorised by section 1 of, and the first schedule to, the Short Titles Act 1896. Due to the repeal of those provisions it is now authorised by section 19(2) of the Interpretation Act 1978.)
- Act of Parliament
- Parliament of Great Britain
- Long title: An act for the better Preservation of Parochial Libraries in England
- Citation: 7 Ann. c. 14
- Territorial extent: Great Britain

Dates
- Royal assent: 21 April 1709
- Commencement: 16 November 1708 (Note: Start of session.)
- Repealed: 1 September 2018 (Note: The Ecclesiastical Jurisdiction and Care of Churches Measure 2018 (Commencement and Transitional Provision) Order 2018 (SI 2018/720).)
Other legislation
Amended by	Statute Law Revision Act 1888; Statute Law (Repeals) Act 2004; Statute Law (Repeals) Measure 2018
Repealed by	Ecclesiastical Jurisdiction and Care of Churches Measure 2018

Status: Repealed

Text of statute as originally enacted

Revised text of statute as amended

The Parochial Libraries Act 1708 (7 Ann. c. 14) was an act of the Parliament of Great Britain. It governed parochial libraries established for ministers of the Church of England.

The act is one of the oldest pieces of legislation concerning libraries in the United Kingdom.

The preamble to the act noted that throughout the country, many parish clergy were provided with stipends so small that they were not able to purchase books for their studies, and as a result many small charitable libraries for this purpose had been recently established.

In order to better protect these libraries from misuse or disposal, the act stipulated that such establishments were to be maintained for the purpose for which they had been provided, and that the incumbent of the parish was to provide security, if so requested, "by bond or otherwise", to ensure this. The appropriate ordinary of the church, or the supervising archdeacon, was given authority to enquire into the condition of parochial libraries and appoint visitors to examine them, to ensure that they were maintained in a good condition. On the death of an incumbent, or his removal, the library was to be locked and secured until they were replaced, to prevent the loss of the books, excepting any routine use made of the room it was stored in.

Within six months of taking up the incumbency of a parish with a parochial library, or of the establishment of a new library, the incumbent was to produce a catalogue of all the books then in the library and deposit it with the bishopric; likewise, all parochial libraries in existence as of the time of the act were to have such a catalogue produced and deposited by 29 September 1709. As a counterpart to these periodic records, a current register of any donated books or other donations was to be kept, recording the name of the benefactor and the details of the gift.

It was also provided that the ordinary (and, if still living, the original benefactor) were able to make regulations for the use and upkeep of the library, providing that they did not conflict with the original terms of the donation. No book was permitted to be sold or otherwise disposed of without the consent of the ordinary, and then only in cases where it was a duplicate of an existing work. If any book was taken from the library, the incumbent was permitted to bring a lawsuit for damages in the name of the ordinary, any such damages (rated at three times the cost of the book plus legal fees) being used for the maintenance of the library, or to apply to a justice of the peace for a warrant to find the book and immediately return it to the library.

== Subsequent developments ==
Sections 4 and 5 of the act were repealed by section 1 of, and part 8 of the schedule to, the Statute Law (Repeals) Measure 2018, which came into force on 1 July 2018.

The whole act was repealed and replaced (except as to Wales) by the Ecclesiastical Jurisdiction and Care of Churches Measure 2018, a Measure of the General Synod of the Church of England.

== See also ==
- List of libraries in the United Kingdom
