= Tithe Act 1536 =

Act of the Parliament of England

Tithe Act 1536 (Note: The citation of this act by this short title was authorised by section 5 of, and the second schedule to, the Statute Law Revision Act 1948. Due to the repeal of those provisions, it is now authorised by section 19(2) of the Interpretation Act 1978.)
- Act of Parliament
- Parliament of England
- Long title: An Acte for restitucion of the first Fruytys in the tyme of Vacacion to the next Incumbent. (Note: These words are printed against this act in the second column of the second schedule to the Statute Law Revision Act 1948, which is headed "Title".)
- Citation: 28 Hen. 8. c. 11
- Territorial extent: England and Wales

Dates
- Royal assent: 18 July 1536
- Commencement: 8 June 1536 (Note: Start of session.)
- Repealed: 1 July 20181 July 2018 (Note: The Statute Law (Repeals) Measure 2018 (Commencement) Order 2018 (SI 2018/718).)
Other legislation
| Amended by | Statute Law Revision Act 1863; Statute Law Revision Act 1888; First Fruits and Tenths Measure 1926; Pastoral Measure 1968; Endowments and Glebe Measure 1976 |
| Repealed by | Statute Law (Repeals) Measure 2018 |
| Relates to | Tithe Act 1540 |

Status: Repealed

Text of statute as originally enacted

Revised text of statute as amended

The Tithe Act 1536 (28 Hen. 8. c. 11) was an act of the Parliament of England.

== Subsequent developments ==
Sections 5 and 6 of the act were repealed by section 1 of, and the schedule to, the Statute Law Revision Act 1863 (26 & 27 Vict. c. 125), which came into force on 28 July 1863.

The act was modified by the First Fruits and Tenths Measure 1926 (16 & 17 Geo. 5. No. 5) and excluded by sections 68(4) and 70 of, and paragraph 3(1) of schedule 7 to, the Pastoral Measure 1968.

Sections 1 to 3 of the act, in so far as they applied to archdeaconries and benefices, and section 8 of the act, were repealed by section 47(4) of, and schedule 8 to, the Endowments and Glebe Measure 1976.

The whole act was repealed by section 1 of, and part 3 of the schedule to, the Statute Law (Repeals) Measure 2018, which came into force on 1 July 2018.

== See also ==
- Tithe Act
