= Statute Law (Repeals) Measure 2018 =

Measure of the General Synod of the Church of England

Statute Law (Repeals) Measure 2018 (Note: Section 2(1).)
- Measure of the National Assembly for Wales
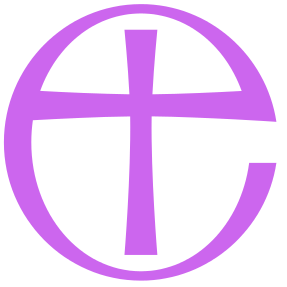
- General Synod of the Church of England
- Long title: A Measure passed by the General Synod of the Church of England to repeal certain enactments of ecclesiastical law which (except in so far as their effect is preserved) are no longer of practical utility.
- Citation: 2018 No. 1
- Territorial extent: Province of Canterbury, except the Channel Islands; Province of York, including the Isle of Man; (Note: Section 2(6).)

Dates
- Royal approval: 10 May 2018
- Commencement: 10 May 2018 (section 2) (Note: Section 2(2).); 1 July 2018 (rest of measure) (Note: Section 2(3). The Statute Law (Repeals) Measure 2018 (Commencement) Order 2018 (SI 2018/718).)

Other legislation
- Amends: See § Repealed enactments

Status: Current legislation

Text of statute as originally enacted

Revised text of statute as amended

Text of the Statute Law (Repeals) Measure 2018 as in force today (including any amendments) within the United Kingdom, from legislation.gov.uk.

The Statute Law (Repeals) Measure 2018 (2018 No. 1) is a measure of the General Synod of the Church of England that repealed enactments of ecclesiastical law which were no longer of practical utility.

The measure was the first general repeals exercise directed at ecclesiastical legislation since the Statute Law (Repeals) Act 2004, which had repealed over 40 ecclesiastical enactments on the recommendation of the Law Commission. It was one of five measures taken through the House of Lords by the Bishop of Rochester on 22 March 2018.

== Provisions ==
=== Repealed enactments ===
Section 1 of the measure repealed 60 enactments and revoked 2 instruments, listed in parts 1 to 9 of the schedule to the measure.

==== Part 1: Clergy ====
Part 1 — Clergy
| Citation | Short title | Extent of repeal |
|---|---|---|
| 26 Hen. 8. c. 14 | Suffragan Bishops Act 1534 | Section 5. |
| 31 Eliz. 1. c. 6 | Simony Act 1588 | Sections 4 and 5 in so far as they impose a penalty by reference to the value of an ecclesiastical living. |
| 1 Geo. 1. St. 2. c. 10 | Queen Anne's Bounty Act 1714 | The whole act. |
| 6 & 7 Will. 4. c. 77 | Ecclesiastical Commissioners Act 1836 | The whole act. |
| 1 & 2 Vict. c. 30 | Sodor and Man Act 1838 | The whole act. |
| 3 & 4 Vict. c. 113 | Ecclesiastical Commissioners Act 1840 | Section 35. |
| 4 & 5 Vict. c. 39 | Ecclesiastical Commissioners Act 1841 | Section 12. |
| 7 & 8 Vict. c. 59 | Lecturers and Parish Clerks Act 1844 | Sections 1 and 4. |
| 16 & 17 Vict. c. 49 | Colonial Bishops Act 1853 | The whole act. |
| 1976 No. 3 | Church of England (Miscellaneous Provisions) Measure 1976 | In section 1— (a) in subsection (1), the words from “, and in particular” to the end, and (b) subsection (6). |
| 1976 No. 3 | Church of England (Miscellaneous Provisions) Measure 1976 | In the Schedule, Part 1. |
| 1978 No. 1 | Dioceses Measure 1978 | Section 18(1). |

==== Part 2: Benefices ====
Part 2 — Benefices
| Citation | Short title | Extent of repeal or revocation |
Main repeals
| 1 & 2 Vict. c. 106 | Pluralities Act 1838 | The whole act, except— (a) section 36, (b) section 59, (c) in section 124, the words from “where the term “benefice” is used” to the end, (d) section 132, and (e) section 133. |
| 4 & 5 Vict. c. 39 | Ecclesiastical Commissioners Act 1841 | Section 24. |
| 32 & 33 Vict. c. 109 | Residence of Incumbents Act 1869 | The whole act. |
| 34 & 35 Vict. c. 45 | Sequestration Act 1871 | The whole act. |
| 48 & 49 Vict. c. 54 | Pluralities Acts Amendment Act 1885 | The whole act. |
Consequential repeals
| 61 & 62 Vict. c. 48 | Benefices Act 1898 | Section 13(2). |
| 1963 No. 1 | Ecclesiastical Jurisdiction Measure 1963 | Section 6(1)(d). |
| 1986 No. 3 | Patronage (Benefices) Measure 1986 | In Schedule 4, paragraph 1 and the preceding cross-heading. |
| SI 2005/3129 | Civil Partnership Act 2004 (Overseas Relationships and Consequential, etc. Amendments) Order 2005 | In Schedule 3, paragraph 1(3). |
| SI 2010/2847 | Ecclesiastical Offices (Terms of Service) (Consequential and Transitional Provisions) Order 2010 | In Schedule 2, paragraphs 1 to 11 and the preceding cross-heading. |

==== Part 3: Ecclesiastical property ====
Part 3 — Ecclesiastical property
| Citation | Short title | Extent of repeal |
Main repeals
| 28 Hen. 8. c. 11 | Tithe Act 1536 | The whole act. |
| 3 Geo. 4. c. 72 | Church Building Act 1822 | The whole act. |
| 2 & 3 Will. 4. c. 80 | Ecclesiastical Corporations Act 1832 | The whole act. |
| 6 & 7 Will. 4. c. 20 | Ecclesiastical Leases Act 1836 | The whole act. |
| 6 & 7 Will. 4. c. 64 | Ecclesiastical Leases (Amendment) Act 1836 | The whole act. |
| 3 & 4 Vict. c. 113 | Ecclesiastical Commissioners Act 1840 | Sections 54 and 55. |
| 5 & 6 Vict. c. 26 | Ecclesiastical Houses of Residence Act 1842 | The whole act, except in section 8 the words from the beginning to “in land or otherwise”. |
| 5 & 6 Vict. c. 108 | Ecclesiastical Leasing Act 1842 | The whole act. |
| 21 & 22 Vict. c. 57 | Ecclesiastical Leasing Act 1858 | The whole act. |
| 28 & 29 Vict. c. 57 | Ecclesiastical Leases Act 1865 | The whole act. |
| 29 & 30 Vict. c. 111 | Ecclesiastical Commissioners Act 1866 | Section 17. |
| 26 Geo. 5 & 1 Edw. 8. No. 5 | Ecclesiastical Commissioners (Powers) Measure 1936 | Sections 6 and 11. |
Consequential repeals
| 10 & 11 Geo. 6. c. 48 | Agriculture Act 1947 | Section 82(2). |
| 14 & 15 Geo. 6. c. 39 | Common Informers Act 1951 | In the Schedule, the entry for the Ecclesiastical Leases Act 1836. |
| 1964 c. 51 | Universities and College Estates Act 1964 | Section 1(1). |
| 1965 c. 2 | Administration of Justice Act 1965 | In Schedule 1, the entry for the Ecclesiastical Houses of Residence Act 1842. |
| 1982 c. 53 | Administration of Justice Act 1982 | Section 46(2)(a)(ii). |
| 1999 No. 1 | Cathedrals Measure 1999 | In section 36(2)— (a) the entry for the Ecclesiastical Leases Act 1836, and (b) the entry for the Ecclesiastical Leases (Amendment) Act 1836. |
| 2005 c. 4 | Constitutional Reform Act 2005 | In Schedule 4, paragraphs 10 to 12 and the preceding cross-heading. |
| 2005 c. 4 | Constitutional Reform Act 2005 | In Schedule 11, paragraph 8 and the preceding cross-heading. |
| 2011 c. 25 | Charities Act 2011 | In section 105— (a) in subsection (7), paragraph (a) and the following “or”, and (b) in subsection (8), “other than the Ecclesiastical Leases Act 1836,”. |

==== Part 4: Ecclesiastical jurisdiction and fees ====
Part 4 — Ecclesiastical jurisdiction and fees
| Citation | Short title | Extent of repeal |
Main repeals
| 1963 No. 1 | Ecclesiastical Jurisdiction Measure 1963 | In section 46(1), the words from “Provided that” to the end. |
| 1976 No. 2 | Ecclesiastical Judges and Legal Officers Measure 1976 | Section 1(3). |
| 1976 No. 2 | Ecclesiastical Judges and Legal Officers Measure 1976 | Section 6. |
| 1986 No. 2 | Ecclesiastical Fees Measure 1986 | In Schedule 2, paragraphs 2 to 4. |
| 1994 No. 3 | Church of England (Legal Aid) Measure 1994 | Section 5. |
Consequential repeal
| 1999 No. 2 | Care of Places of Worship Measure 1999 | Section 3(3). |

==== Part 5: Church representation ====
Part 5 — Church representation
| Citation | Short title | Extent of repeal |
Main repeals
| 1 & 2 Geo. 6. No. 3 | Parsonages Measure 1938 | Section 12. |
| 3 & 4 Eliz. 2. No. 1 | Inspection of Churches Measure 1955 | Section 4. |
| 1986 No. 2 | Ecclesiastical Fees Measure 1986 | In Schedule 1— (a) in paragraph 1, “or, if there is no parochial church council, the incumbent or minister”, and (b) in paragraph 2(a), “(if any)”. |
| 1992 No. 1 | Church of England (Miscellaneous Provisions) Measure 1992 | Section 4(2). |
| 2001 No. 1 | Churchwardens Measure 2001 | Section 14. |
| 2001 No. 1 | Churchwardens Measure 2001 | Schedule 1. |
| 2011 No. 3 | Mission and Pastoral Measure 2011 | Section 68(10). |
| 2011 No. 3 | Mission and Pastoral Measure 2011 | In section 103— (a) subsection (1), and (b) in subsection (4), “or a particular parish had no parochial church council or no churchwardens,”. |
Consequential repeals
| 1999 No. 2 | Care of Places of Worship Measure 1999 | In section 3(4), “, 4”. |
| 2005 No. 3 | Church of England (Miscellaneous Provisions) Measure 2005 | In Schedule 1, paragraph 7. |

==== Part 6: Services ====
Part 6 — Services
| Citation | Short title | Extent of repeal |
|---|---|---|
| 1972 No. 1 | Admission to Holy Communion Measure 1972 | The whole measure. |

==== Part 7: Church Commissioners ====
Part 7 — Church Commissioners
| Citation | Short title | Extent of repeal |
|---|---|---|
| 3 & 4 Vict. c. 113 | Ecclesiastical Commissioners Act 1840 | Sections 84, 86 and 88. |
| 23 & 24 Vict. c. 124 | Ecclesiastical Commissioners Act 1860 | Section 13. |
| 23 & 24 Vict. c. 124 | Ecclesiastical Commissioners Act 1860 | In section 14, the words from “; but this enactment” to the end. |
| 2000 No. 1 | Church of England (Miscellaneous Provisions) Measure 2000 | Section 1. |

==== Part 8: Education, &c. ====
Part 8 — Education, &c.
| Citation | Short title | Extent of repeal |
|---|---|---|
| 7 Ann. c. 14 | Parochial Libraries Act 1708 | Sections 4 and 5. |
| 1991 No. 2 | Diocesan Boards of Education Measure 1991 | Section 12. |

==== Part 9: Cathedrals ====
Part 9 — Cathedrals
| Citation | Short title | Extent of repeal |
|---|---|---|
| 1976 No. 1 | Cathedrals Measure 1976 | Section 8. |
| 1999 No. 1 | Cathedrals Measure 1999 | In section 38— (a) subsections (1) to (3), and (b) in subsection (4), the words from “and any order” to “a cathedral” and the words “or 15(2)” and “, respectively”. |
| 1999 No. 1 | Cathedrals Measure 1999 | Schedule 1. |

== Subsequent developments ==
Section 1 of, and the schedule to, the measure were brought into force on 1 July 2018 by the Statute Law (Repeals) Measure 2018 (Commencement) Order 2018 (SI 2018/718), made jointly by the Archbishop of Canterbury and the Archbishop of York under section 2(3) of the measure.
