= Religion in Victorian England =

Religion in Victorian England was a major factor in society and politics. Historian G. Kitson Clark says that apart from the 17th century, "In no other century did the claims of religion occupy so large a part in the nation's life, nor did men speaking in the name of religion contrived to exercise so much power." He emphasizes major social reforms and argues the main motivating force was the evangelical revival movement inside and outside the Church of England. Controversies raged over the established status of the Church of England, as minority denominations, especially Catholics, demanded equality. There were theological disputes, particularly about the truth of the Bible. Moral standards were high in Britain and how to maintain morality became a factor in issues such as education. The rapid growth of the British Empire overseas inspired very active missionary programs.

== Controversies ==
Religion was politically controversial during this era, with Nonconformists (also called "Dissidents") pushing for the disestablishment of the Church of England. Nonconformists comprised about half of church attendees in England in 1851 and were a clear majority in Wales. Scotland and Ireland which had separate religious cultures. Gradually the legal discrimination that had been established against them outside of Scotland was removed. Legal restrictions on Roman Catholics were also largely removed. The number of Catholics grew in Great Britain due to conversions and immigration from Ireland. Secularism and doubts about the accuracy of the Old Testament grew among people with higher levels of education. Northern English and Scottish academics tended to be more religiously conservative, whilst agnosticism and even atheism (though its promotion was illegal) gained appeal among academics in the south. Historians refer to a 'Victorian Crisis of Faith', a period when religious views had to readjust to accommodate new scientific knowledge and criticism of the Bible.

== Church of England: Crisis and expansion ==
Despite its lofty status as the official legally established church in England, The Church of England faced an acute crisis in the early 19th century. This led to major reforms in the 1830s and 1840s. The bishops were widely disliked, a sentiment vividly demonstrated by the public outcry in 1832 against William Howley the Archbishop of Canterbury. Non-Anglican Dissenters --especially the Methodists--intensified their campaign for disestablishment, seeking to strip the Church of its official state status and privileges. The public was troubled about the Church's shocking abuses and anomalies, including a grossly unequal distribution of its wealth and a clergy often absent from their parishes. A small but increasingly vocal group of radicals advocated for reducing the Church's political power (de-ecclesiasticisation), while the governing Whig Party was, at best, apathetic toward the Church's welfare. Activists inside the Church recognized the growing disconnect between their institution and the general public. Against the escalating internal and external threats, the Church survived largely due to the foresight of churchmen who promoted greater tolerance and successfully drove through significant institutional reforms. In retrospect, this survival wasn't a miracle: the radicals pushing for fundamental change were not close to gaining political power, and Dissenters only achieved real influence in Parliament later on.

During the 19th century, the established Church of England expanded greatly at home and abroad. It enrolled about half the population, especially in rural areas where the local gentry dominated religious affairs. However it was much weaker in the fast-growing industrial cities. It was an established state church, and starting with Prime Minister Robert Peel in 1835 the government used Ecclesiastical Commissioners to make policy.

For centuries rich men had endowed local parishes with funding the bishops could not touch. Available Church of England funding came largely from voluntary contributions. Bishops used this money to doubled the number of active clergyman, and built or enlarged several thousand churches. Around mid-century it was consecrating seven new or rebuilt churches every month. It proudly took primary responsibility for a rapid expansion of elementary education, with parish-based schools, and diocesan-based colleges to train the necessary teachers. In the 1870s, the national government assume part of the funding; in 1880 the Church was educating 73% of all students. In addition there was a vigorous home mission, with many clergy, scripture readers, visitors, deaconesses and Anglican sisters in the rapidly growing cities.

In addition to local endowments and pew rentals, Church financing came from a few government grants, and especially from voluntary contributions. The result was that some old rural parishes were well funded, and most of the rapidly growing urban parishes were underfunded.

Overseas the Church kept up with the expanding Empire. The Church Missionary Society founded in 1799 sponsored extensive missionary work, supporting 90 new bishoprics and thousands of missionaries across the globe.

== Evangelical and Nonconformist Protestantism ==
The Protestants outside the Church of England were divided and subdivided. For example the Baptists had divided into competing sects: Particular; General; New Connexion General; Seventh-Day; and Strict. Several different Methodist sects emerged and they formed the largest subgroup of evangelicals. Methodism began within the Church of England in 1739 and by 1800 Wesleyan Methodism broke away and became a separate denomination. Methodism was based theologically on Arminianism, which emphasized free will and universal salvation. It subsequently split into more militant churches such as the Primitive Methodists. Wesleyan Calvinistic Methodism was spread to older Dissenting denominations by George Whitfield who pioneered a moderate form of Calvinism which tempered the strict doctrine of Election (salvation for the elect few) with the possibility of universal redemption and which appealed many Baptists, Congregationalists and Presbyterians.

The start of the 19th century saw an increase in overseas missionary work in the fast-growing British Empire and the major missionary societies were founded (see Timeline of Christian missions). In the Church of England both the Evangelical and high church factions sponsored missionaries. They functioned as powerful agents of cultural transformation, serving as the cultural wing of Western power projection. Historians have examined the complexity of the interaction, recognizing the diverse motivations of missionaries and, crucially, the agency of indigenous people in shaping the ultimate outcomes of these cultural encounters.

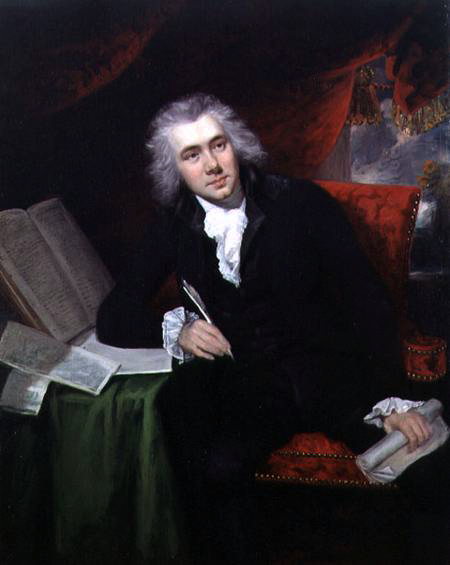
William Wilberforce (1759-1833) was a politician, philanthropist and an evangelical Anglican, who led the British movement to abolish the slave trade.

In addition to stressing the traditional Wesleyan combination of "Bible, cross, conversion, and activism", the revivalist movement sought a universal appeal, designed to reach rich and poor, urban and rural, and men and women. They added work to keep the children their parents brought and to generate literature to spread God's message. The first evangelical megachurch, the Metropolitan Tabernacle with its 6000-seat auditorium, was launched in 1861 in London by Charles Spurgeon, a Baptist.

"Christian conscience" was the target chosen by the British Evangelical movement to promote social activism. Evangelicals believed activism in government and the social sphere was an essential method in reaching the goal of eliminating sin in a world drenched in wickedness. The Evangelicals in the Clapham Sect included figures such as William Wilberforce who successfully campaigned for the abolition of slavery.

John Nelson Darby (1800–1882) of the Plymouth Brethren was an Irish Anglican minister who devised modern dispensationalism, an innovative Protestant theological interpretation of the Bible that was incorporated in the development of modern Evangelicalism. According to scholar Mark S. Sweetnam, dispensationalism can be defined in terms of its Evangelicalism, its insistence on the literal interpretation of Scripture, its recognition of stages in God's dealings with humanity, its expectation of the imminent return of Christ to rapture His saints, and its focus on both apocalypticism and premillennialism.

Protestant Dissenters chafed under the burden of paying Anglican church rates. They achieved civil registration of marriage in 1836. Instead of the requirement to marry in the parish church. They were angered by Catholic emancipation, which came by 1829.

A major battlefield was schooling. The Church of England had its own network of schools for its members, and wanted government funding. Dissenters favored secular schooling, governed in towns by elected boards of education, rather than forceable attendance at Church of England schools. Fierce battles over the religious component of schools raged well into the 20th century.

The religious census of 1851, taken in conjunction with the population census, showed parity of numbers between the Anglican laity and all other Christian denominations, making Britain religiously pluralistic at least within the Christian faith despite its nominal commitment to uniformity.

== Catholics and Anti-Catholicism ==
Anti-Catholic attitudes persisted throughout the 19th century, particularly following the sudden massive Irish Catholic migration to England and Scotland during the Great Famine of the mid-1840s.

The forces of anti-Catholicism were defeated by the unexpected mass mobilization of Catholic activists in Ireland, led by Daniel O'Connell. The Catholics had long been passive but now there was a clear threat of insurrection that troubled Prime Minister Wellington and his aide Robert Peel. The passage of Catholic emancipation in 1829, which allowed Catholics to sit in Parliament, opened the way for a large Irish Catholic contingent. Year by year the Catholics mobilized their voters into a well-disciplined bloc that played a powerful role in the British Parliament under the leadership especially of O'Connell, Charles Stewart Parnell and John Redmond. Lord Shaftesbury (1801–1885), a prominent philanthropist, was a pre-millennial evangelical Anglican who believed in the imminent second coming of Christ, and became a leader in anti-Catholicism. He strongly opposed the Oxford movement in the Church of England, fearful of its high church Catholics features. In 1845, he denounced the Maynooth Grant which funded the Catholic seminary in Ireland that would train many priests. In Ireland the Anglican "Church of Ireland" lost its established status in 1871, but remained the church of the English-speaking Protestants who owned most of the farmland on which the Irish Catholics were tenants or laborers. The Irish Catholics mobilized politically and at times used violence. Starting in the 1890s the British government bought out these landlords (who returned to England), and sold the land to the local Catholics. In 1850 Pope Pius IX re-established the Catholic ecclesiastical hierarchy with new bishops. The response was a frenzy of anti-Catholic feeling, often stoked by newspapers. Examples include an effigy of Cardinal Wiseman, the new head of the restored hierarchy, being paraded through the streets and burned on Bethnal Green, and graffiti proclaiming 'No popery!' being chalked on walls. Charles Kingsley wrote a vigorously anti-Catholic book Hypatia (1853). The novel was mainly aimed at the embattled Catholic minority in England, who had recently emerged from a half-illegal status.

New Catholic episcopates, which ran parallel to the established Anglican episcopates, and a Catholic conversion drive awakened fears of 'papal aggression' and relations between the Catholic Church and the establishment remained frosty. At the end of the century one observer concluded that "the prevailing opinion of the religious people I knew and loved was that Roman Catholic worship is idolatry, and that it was better to be an Atheist than a Papist". When ritualistic practices in the Church of England came under attack as too ritualistic and too much akin to Catholicism, Parliament passed the Public Worship Regulation Act in 1874 to reverse the trend.

The Liberal party leader William Ewart Gladstone was a devout high-church Anglican. He had a complex ambivalence about Catholicism. Although attracted by its international success in majestic traditions, he strongly opposed to the authoritarianism of its pope and bishops, its profound public opposition to liberalism, and its refusal to distinguish between secular allegiance on the one hand and spiritual obedience on the other. The danger came when the pope or bishops attempted to exert temporal power, as in the Vatican decrees of 1870. a papal attempt to control churches in different nations, despite their independent nationalism. His polemical pamphlet against the infallibility declaration of the Catholic Church sold 150,000 copies in 1874. He demanded that Catholics obey the crown and disobey the pope and priests when there was disagreement.

== Judaism ==
The Jewish community in Victorian England was marked by broad-scale acceptance to equal status, with the end to historic barriers and limitations. There was some antisemitism, but far less than in other major European countries, Russia, Austria, Germany and France.) The Jewish community was largely based in London with a presence in a few other large cities. Emancipation from political restrictions began in the 18th century and progressed steadily with no reversals. By the mid-19th century, Jews in England had largely achieved legal emancipation. The process culminated in the admission of Lionel de Rothschild to Parliament in 1858 after a successful struggle for the right to affirm rather than swear Christian oaths. Jewish emancipation symbolized the liberalizing spirit of the Victorian state and affirmed Britain's self-image as a tolerant, constitutional monarchy. In terms of social status, the Jewish community was below average in 1800, then moved up steadily to well above average by the 1860s,

There was some immigration from Germany. After the Russian anti-Jewish pogroms began in 1881, there was an influx of poor Jewish refugees from Eastern Europe. (The great majority of refugees went to New York.) From the 1840s to 1900 Anglo-Jewry grew from about 20,000 to over 100,000. Victorian Jewry was religiously pluralistic. Reform Judaism, influenced by German and Enlightenment ideals, emerged alongside the much larger Orthodox practice. Anglo-Jewish leaders such as Chief Rabbi Nathan Adler sought to unify diverse congregations under institutional authority, organizing education, charity, and religious life through the United Synagogue (founded 1870). Sunday schools, benevolent societies, and burial clubs reflected both internal cohesion and adaptation to Victorian social norms. The Victorian Jewish community emphasized respectability, philanthropy, and education as routes to acceptance in broader British society. The Rothschild, Montefiore, and Mocatta families played prominent roles as financiers and philanthropists, supporting hospitals, schools, and civic institutions. Typically the diverse Jewish communities sponsored numerous philanthropic efforts. See Jewish Board of Guardians and Jewish Care. Jewish participation in finance, commerce and clothing manufacturing contributed to the economy's modernization and to widespread favourable perceptions of Jews as industrious citizens. Cultural leaders like novelists Disraeli and Grace Aguilar and poet Amy Levy engaged with questions of faith, gender, and national belonging. Prime Minister Benjamin Disraeli was a practicing Protestant who was very proud of his Jewish heritage.

Despite progress, antisemitic stereotypes persisted in Victorian popular culture, literature, and politics. Jews were sometimes caricatured as morally suspect in newspapers and novels, reflecting anxieties about immigration and capitalism. The depiction of Shylock in theatrical revivals and the social panic surrounding East End immigrants in the 1880s revealed enduring prejudice within the very framework of tolerance. Nevertheless, sustained Jewish participation in civic life gradually challenged and reshaped public attitudes toward religious minorities.

== Morality ==
Victorian morality was a surprising new reality. The changes in moral standards and actual behaviour across the British were profound. Historian Harold Perkin wrote:

Between 1780 and 1850 the English ceased to be one of the most aggressive, brutal, rowdy, outspoken, riotous, cruel and bloodthirsty nations in the world and became one of the most inhibited, polite, orderly, tender-minded, prudish and hypocritical.

Historians continue to debate the various causes of this dramatic change. Asa Briggs emphasizes the strong reaction against the French Revolution, and the need to focus British efforts on its defeat and not be diverged by pleasurable sins. Briggs also stresses the powerful role of the evangelical movement among the Nonconformists, as well as the evangelical faction inside the established Church of England. The religious and political reformers set up organizations that monitored behaviour, and pushed for government action.

Among the higher social classes, there was a marked decline in gambling, horse races, and obscene theatres; there was much less heavy gambling or patronage of upscale houses of prostitution. The highly visible debauchery characteristic of aristocratic England in the early 19th century simply disappeared.

Historians agree that the middle classes not only professed high personal moral standards, but actually followed them. There is a debate whether the working classes followed suit. Moralists in the late 19th century such as Henry Mayhew decried the slums for their supposed high levels of cohabitation without marriage and illegitimate births. However new research using computerized matching of data files shows that the rates of cohabitation were quite low—under 5%—for the working class and the poor. By contrast, in 21st-century Britain nearly half of all children are born outside marriage, and nine in ten newlyweds have been cohabitating.

The growing middle class and strong evangelical movement placed great emphasis on a respectable and moral code of behaviour. This included features such as charity, personal responsibility, avoiding alcoholism and excessive gambling, strict child discipline and intense self-criticism. Increasing emphasis was given to social reform. Secular people often favoured Utilitarianism, which also emphasised social progress. An alliance formed between these two ideological strands. The reformers emphasised causes such as improving the conditions of women and children, giving police reform priority over harsh punishment to prevent crime, religious equality, and political reform in order to establish a democracy. The political legacy of the reform movement was to link the nonconformists (part of the evangelical movement) in England and Wales with the Liberal Party. This continued until the First World War. The Presbyterians played a similar role as a religious voice for reform in Scotland.

== Higher criticism of the Bible ==
Biblical criticism is the application of historical and literary analysis techniques, similar to those used for any written work. It seeks to establish the most reliable texts (known as "lower criticism") and to provide an objective, scientific basis for interpretation (known as "higher criticism"). In Victorians Britain the method was adopted from German scholarship. It became highly controversial since it strongly indicated that much of the Bible was not literally true. Scholars concentrated on how the "Pentateuch" (the first five books of the Old Testament) was written and rewritten over the centuries. For traditional Protestants the Bible was the foundation of their religion—they saw it viewed as inspired once and for all by God and He demanded man to follow it to obtain salvation. Biblical criticism, by questioning the literal accuracy and historicity of accounts became a profound threat to belief systems. Critics warned it would become an evil source of moral anarchy. Supporters led by Samuel Taylor Coleridge, Thomas Arnold and Julius Hare synthesized and endorsed German scholarship. John Colenso an Anglican bishop, in 1862 concluded that little of the Pentateuch dated from Moses' time and questioned the historicity of Moses and Joshua, He used statistical analysis to reject the accuracy of biblical numbers (for example, the huge number of people in the Sinai desert.) Regarding the New Testament the higher criticism emphasized the human elements in Jesus's life and played down the miraculous. The Broad Church faction of Anglicanism was somewhat receptive. Other religious factions denounced the higher criticism as the devil's work. Despite initial opposition, biblical criticism was eventually partly absorbed into the mainstream of the Church of England, as seen in 1896 when Frederick Temple was named to the highest office in the Anglican Church, Archbishop of Canterbury.).

== Impact on political culture ==
Historian George Kitson Clark emphasizes the powerful role of religious claims and religious voices in Victorian British political culture. The era began in the 1830s with the great anti-slavery movement that climaxed with the abolition of slavery in the colonies. It was a highly emotional, brilliantly organized nationwide campaign that achieved one of the most dramatic shifts in global human rights: the abolition of chattel slavery of Africans. This crusade provided a model for moral reform activism because it showed that moral outrage focused through well-organized campaigns could effect major societal change. Many secular political movements consciously adopted its emotive, crusading form. Clark argues that the roots religion's political impact can be traced to Evangelical Revival that began in the 18th century. It rejuvenated the Church of England, infusing new life into the sleepy established church. Even more the revivals greatly strengthened the Nonconformist element outside the Church of England. It inspired social activism in the young, well-organized and highly disciplined Methodist Church of Great Britain, which served as a model for labor activists and social movements. The revival also provided fresh impetus to Congregationalists, Presbyterians, and Baptists. The major social result was what became famous as "Victorian morality" of elites and commoners alike. The major political result saw the Nonconformists play a central role in the rise after 1850 of the new Liberal Party that emerged in the 1850s. The values, organization, and activism stemming from the evangelical revivals helped shape the Liberal political style. Religion forces thus reshaped the nation's political landscape and progressive causes as well.

== See also ==
- Ecclesiastical Commissioners
- Jewish emancipation in the United Kingdom
- Victorian era
- Victorian morality
