= Charles Reynolds (cleric) =

Irish Catholic cleric

The Venerable Charles Reynolds BCL
- Archdeacon of Kells
- Native name: Cathal Mac Raghnaill
- Diocese: Meath
- Appointed: 13 February 1532
- Predecessor: John Treguran
- Successor: Thomas Lockwood
- Other post: Rector of Nobber
- Previous post: Canon at Priory of Mohill

Orders
- Rank: Archdeacon, Bishop-elect

Personal details
- Born: Cathal Mac Raghnaill c. 1496 Mohill, county Leitrim, Ireland
- Died: 15 July 1535 (aged 38–39) Rome, Kingdom of Italy
- Buried: Archbasilica of St. John Lateran, Rome
- Denomination: Roman Catholic
- Residence: Mohill, later Maynooth
- Parents: Marus Mac Raghnaill
- Education: Canon law
- Alma mater: University of Oxford

Charles Reynolds (Irish: Cathal Mac Raghnaill; c. 1496 – July 1535) was an Irish Catholic cleric, canonist, and diocesan administrator. Born in County Leitrim into an Irish clan of Hiberno-Norse descent and son of Marcus Mac Raghnaill, Reynolds entered a religious order and was appointed to influential posts as archdeacon and military chaplain to the Earl of Kildare. His name in native Irish is Cathal Mac Raghnaill, but he used the Anglicized name of "Archdeacon Charles Reynolds" whenever he was in the Pale or in the company of English-speakers. He was educated at the University of Oxford and was multilingual; being fluent in English, Irish, and Ecclesiastical Latin. Archdeacon Reynolds opposed Henry VIII of England's policy of imposing Caesaropapism upon the Catholic Church in his dominions, declined to acknowledge him as Supreme Head of the Church of England, and refusing to acknowledge the annulment of the King's marriage to Catherine of Aragon or his uncanonical remarriage to Anne Boleyn.

During the Kildare Rebellion of 1534–1535 against King Henry, Reynolds was dispatched as envoy to Rome to seek support from Pope Paul III. In May 1535 he secured a papal promise to excommunicate King Henry.

Reynolds died of an "incurable fever" and was buried in Archbasilica of St. John Lateran on 15 July 1535. The inscription on his grave slab in Rome gives accurate dates for his birth in Ireland, death in Rome, provides a family setting, and reveals the pope intended to consecrate him as a bishop.

Reynolds was posthumously attained for high treason in the Attainder of the Earl of Kildare Act 1536 and is sometimes included as one of the Irish Catholic Martyrs.

== Life ==
=== Early life (1496–1531) ===
Henry VIII

Charles Reynolds was born in 1496 or 1497 at Mohill, County Leitrim, then the religious centre of Muintir Eolais. His father was Maurus Mac Raghnaill, secular canon in the parish of Ardagh. (Note: Papal records name Maurus Magrannel as canon in the church of Ardagh, at Mohill on 25 March 1489, 1497, and 1508. Manning noted the "Dictionary of Irish biography (viii, 449) claims Reynolds was a 'member of a prominent ecclesiastical family, which may have been a branch of the Gaelic Irish Mac Raghnaill dynasty that moved at some time into the Pale', but remarks that "no evidence is presented or reference given".) Whether he had brothers or sisters is not recorded. His father or mother taught him Latin before enrolling him in school for children of nobility. By age fifteen he was a novice at the Augustinian Priory of Saint Mary in Mohill-Manachan, a monastery of the Canons regular of St. Augustine. The Canons Regular of Saint Augustine were one of several institutions born from an eleventh-century religious reform movement. The ecclesiastical, or erenagh, branch of the Mac Raghnaill derbhfine had very strong associations with the Augustinian priory of Mohill, County Leitrim, from at least the 15th-century. (Note: Many clerics from Mohill named Reynolds are recorded. A son of Eogan Mâg Raghnaill, prior of Mohill, died in 1473. A Ferghal Mac Raghnaill, prior of Maethal, died in 1486. and Maurus Mac Raghnaill may have succeeded as prior. Gilchreest mac Sean Mac Raghnaill, a grandson of the prior of Mohill, was killed by "Clann Maoleachlainn" in 1486. Master Donald McGranyll of Ardagh presided at a metropolitan court at Termonfeckin in 1526. One Thady Reynolds, vicar of Clonard in 1534, and bishop of Kildare in 1540.) (Note: For full details on the known Reynolds ecclesiastical family, consult Monastery of Mohill-Manchan#Personalities.)

Nothing is known of his early life and ministries. Charles must have been highly regarded because sometime after completing his novitiate in Mohill, he was transferred, or moved, to the more important Diocese of Meath. In 1528 he was studying Canon law at the University of Oxford, a rare and almost unheard of privilege for Gaels. Because the Clan Mac Raghnaill were allied to the Fitzgerald Earl of Kildare, the Church may have given him preferential treatment. Reynolds graduated in Canon Law around 1531, and secured a grant of "English liberty" entitling him to acquire property and ecclesiastical promotion in the Pale . (Note: "Grant of English liberty to Charles Reynolds, otherwise Magranyll, bachelor of laws: that he may be free of all Irish service, use and enjoy the English laws, and acquire lands and possessions. – Oct. 9, 23. (Patent Roll 22, 23 Henry VIII. – 1531-2)".)

=== Archdeacon of Kells (1532–1534) ===
On returning to Ireland, Reynolds became chaplain to Gerald FitzGerald, 9th Earl of Kildare, lord deputy of Ireland. The Fitzgerald dynasty was the most powerful family in Ireland. (Note: Fitzgerald's father, the 8th Earl, was commonly called "uncrowned King of Ireland".) Reynolds was also appointed archdeacon of Kells and rector of Nobber on 13 Feb 1532. A canonist, he was very active as a diocesan and provincial administrator. His appointments came during a time of tremendous international change, and a dangerous time for Christendom. Reynolds soon became involved in huge political issues.

=== Revolt against Henry VIII (1534–1535) ===
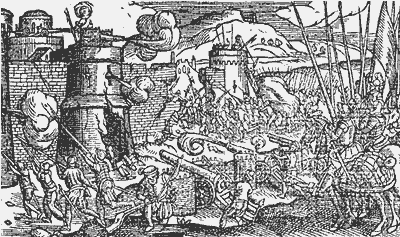
Kildare Rebellion

During 1533, the political situation in Ireland and England was fraught with tension over Henry Tudor's English Reformation. (Note: The English Reformation was a series of events in the 16th century leading to the Church of England to break away from the authority of the Pope and Roman Catholic Church.) The Irish Council in the Pale was dominated by rival Old English factions, and the only clerics trusted by the King to promote his policies of Caesaropapism and the Reformation in Ireland were three Englishmen, the most prominent being John Alen, Archbishop of Dublin. Rumours circulated that Charles V, Holy Roman Emperor, aggrieved by the treatment of his aunt, Catherine of Aragon, might intervene in Ireland. Thomas Cromwell, Henry's chief minister, decided to appoint an Englishman, William Skeffington as lord deputy in Ireland. The incumbent, Gerald Fitzgerald, was imprisoned in the Tower of London in spring 1534, provoking his son Silken Thomas, who falsely believed his father to have been executed and that himself and his uncles were certain to be next, to raise the Irish clans and Old English soldiery subject to his leadership and launch the "Kildare rebellion". Charles V responded quickly to appeals for assistance by dispatching emissaries. The potential for a military intervention drew international attention on Ireland.

Reynolds was a prominent member of a group of senior Irish clerics denouncing Henry as a heretic. (Note: The group of senior clerics, in the English Pale, were Cormac Roth, Archdeacon and official principal of Armagh; Edward Dillion, dean of Saint Brigid's Cathedral in Kildare, and prebendary of Maynooth in Saint Patrick's Cathedral, Dublin; Charles Reynolds, the Archdeacon of Kells and official principal of Meath, and Dr John Travers, an English Theologian and chancellor of Saint Patricks Cathedral, who supported the Kildare Rebellion on religious grounds.) These clerics shared a held belief English rule was empowered, under Laudabiliter-inspired papal sanction, to merely reform the Irish along conventional canonical lines only. Recognising the English revolution as fundamentally attacking the intellectual and legal basis for their canonical beliefs, they were spurred into revolt and radical action. They believed the King of England had rejected the papal authority and tradition upon which his sovereign rule in Ireland rested, therefore his authority had to be denied. Prospects for a successful rebellion receded, when a fleeing Archbishop John Alen was captured and killed by rebels. The Pope responded by excommunicating Silken Thomas.

Reynolds was dispatched as an envoy abroad to pursue an alliance against Henry VIII of England, and seek his excommunication. (Note: "In 1535, a MacRanell, Archdeacon of Kells, was deputed by 'the Silken Lord', Lord Thomas Fitzgerald, and his adherents, to seek aid against the English from the Pope, and from Charles the Fifth".) He left Ireland by a boat from Sligo in December 1534. He first visited James V of Scotland, who was generally uncooperative with Henry VIII over Ireland. Reynolds was offered encouragement and was furnished with a letter from James V, complimenting him to cardinal Benedict of Ravenna, his agent. Reynolds travelled to Spain and met Charles V in either Madrid or Toledo. He received further encouragement and a promise of military assistance which ultimately never materialised. Reynolds finally travelled on to Italy and arrived there in May 1535, and presented his case personally to the Pope.

=== Papal meeting (1535) ===
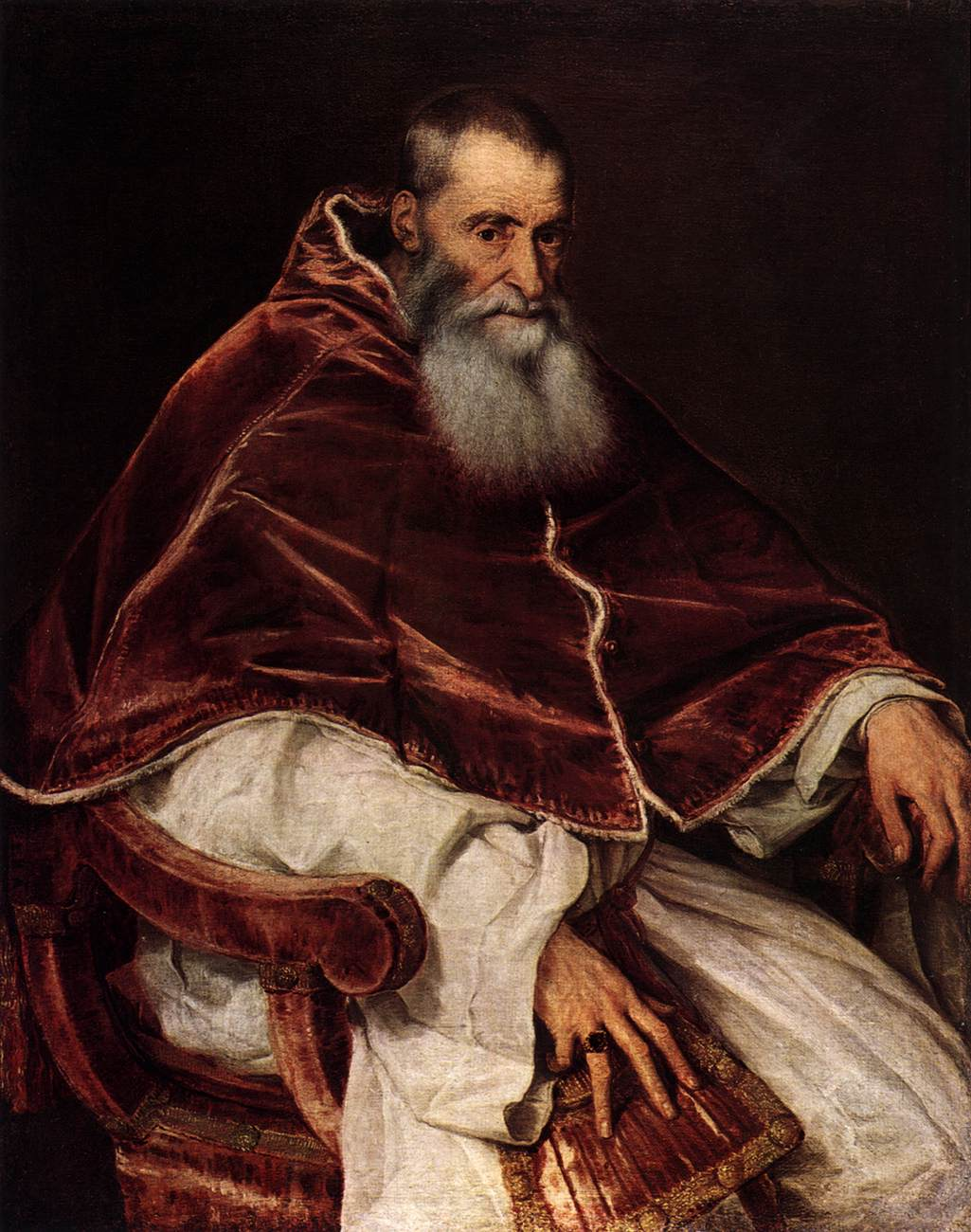
Pope Paul III

Reynolds issued a stinging rebuke to pope Paul III for not condemning the heretical and schismatic behaviour of King Henry. He said he represented the Earl of Kildare, the other great nobles of Ireland, and their allies in England. (Note: The report of Reynolds meeting with the Pope suggests he, and Irish rebels, had contacts with English nonconformists.) He argued against Henry's ecclesiastical policy in general, rather than simply referring to the Irish political and ecclesiastical grievances. The pope, he said, was negligent for allowing so many souls to be lost by dallying over Henry's matrimonial question. If he had already passed the sentence of excommunication earned by Henry, the English would willingly arise in rebellion and secure its execution. In support of his presentation, Reynolds shared printed propaganda pamphlets published by the King, and a copy of Pope Innocent III's grant to John, King of England supporting the notion Ireland was a papal fiefdom subject to Rome's authority. Reynolds also requested absolution for his master, Silken Thomas, in failing to prevent Archbishop Alen from being murdered. He alleged Alen had promoted the heretical policy of the English crown and plotted murder upon the Earls of Kildare.

Pedro Ortiz, Charles V's ambassador in Rome, kept minutes of the papal meeting. According to Ortiz, Pope Paul III was impressed by his arguments, absolved the Earl, apologised for past negligence and dutifully promised to excommunicate King Henry VIII.

== Death ==
Reynolds never left Rome. (Note: One of his very last acts was to be a signatory to an agreement regarding the rectory of Loughsewdy, signed on 1 July 1535.) He developed an "incurable fever", possibly malaria, and died in early July 1535, one day before the Pope was to appoint him Bishop of Elphin and Clonmacnoise. Reynolds was buried in the Archbasilica of St. John Lateran in Rome on the ides (15th) July 1535.

for the accomplishment of his traitorous purpose sent his letters addressed as well to the bishop of Rome as emperor by one Cale McGranill otherwise called Charles Reynold, archdeacon of Kells, for to have their aid against our said sovereign lord and his heirs for the winning of the said land of Ireland out of their possession and he to hold the same of them forever.

— Conleth Manning, The grave-slab of Charles Reynolds in Rome, quoting the Act of Attainder.

=== Legacy ===
On 30 August 1535, Pope Paul III drew up a bull of excommunication which began "Eius qui immobilis". On 17 December 1538, Pope Paul III issued a further bull which began "Cum redemptor noster", renewing the execution of the bull of 30 August 1535, which had been suspended in a cautious hope Henry would repeal his behaviour.

Had Reynolds not died and returned to Ireland, he faced imprisonment and execution because the Attainder of the Earl of Kildare Act 1536 convicted him, Silken Thomas, and others, by name for high treason. (Note: A second clerical envoy dispatched abroad by rebels, Dominic Power, was pardoned following a petition of Charles V. Nonetheless, Power never returned to Ireland, and died in Lisbon.) Reynold's estate was confiscated for the King's use.

=== Grave slab in Rome ===
Reynolds' grave-slab is in the cloister of the basilica of St John Lateran, where it is on display. It is damaged on all sides but retains an almost complete inscription that helps better understand what happened to him. It is a large floor-slab measuring 1.42 meters (4.7 ft) tall by 0.62 meters (2.0 ft) wide. The finely carved frame of all'antica style foliate decoration originally framed the entire stone. The top of the slab is lost, though the lower portion of the Fitzgerald crest can be observed, alongside the hind legs of a lion rampant associated with the arms of the Reynolds family.

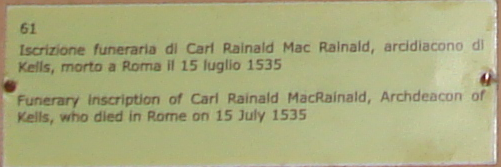
Label accompanying grave slab

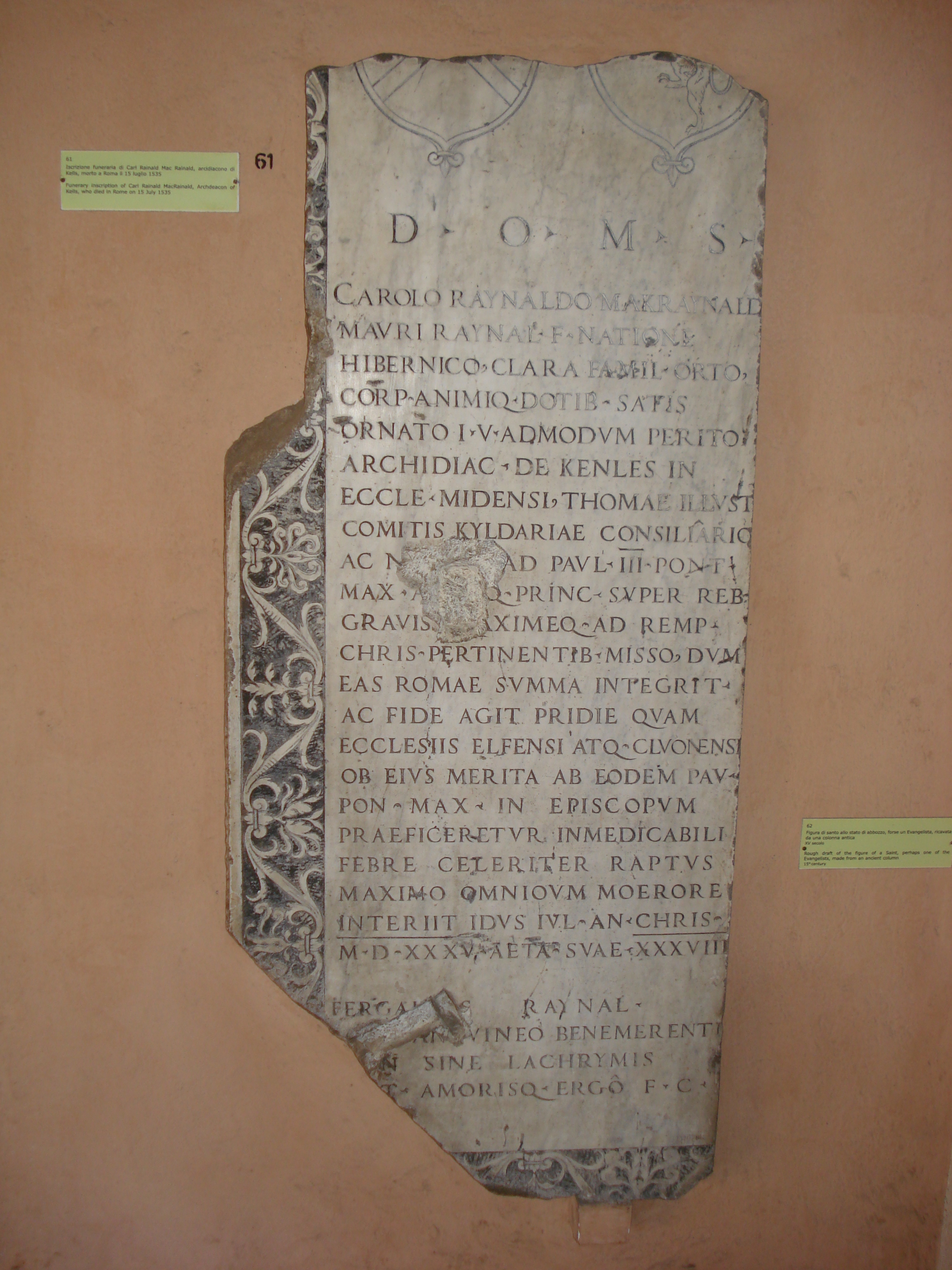
Magrannell Slab in Rome

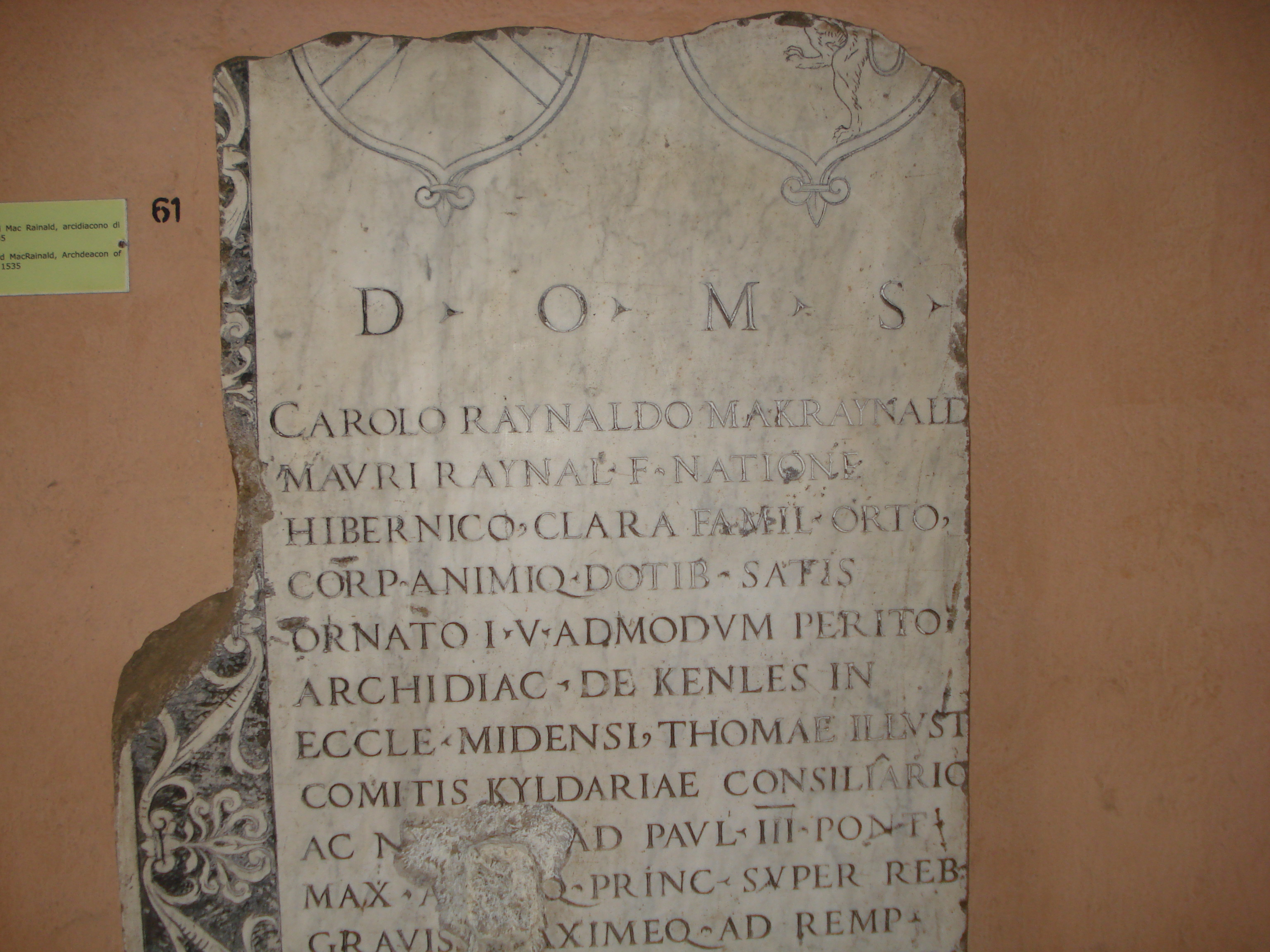
Charles Magrannelll grave-slab – top.

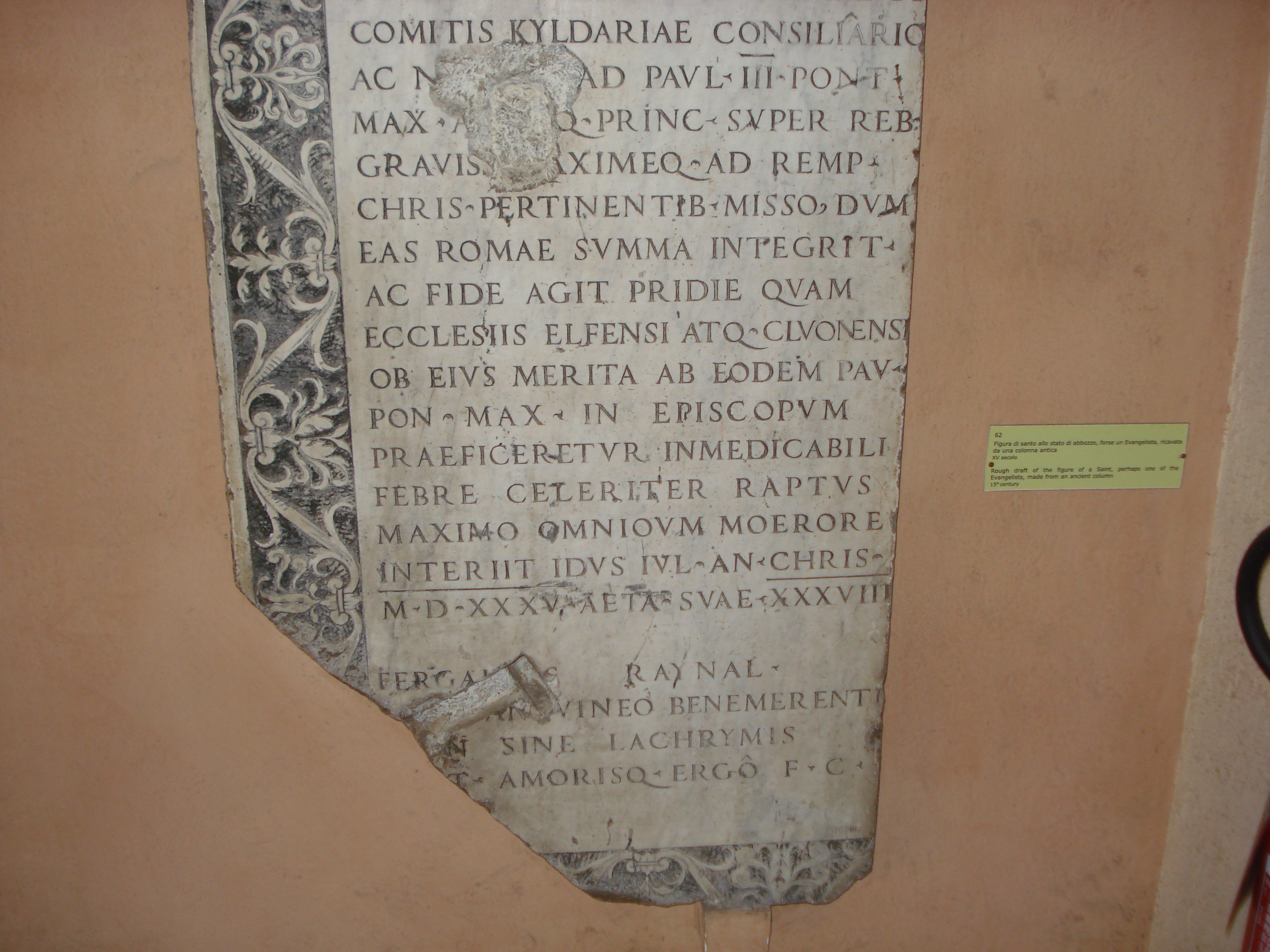
Charles Magrannelll grave-slab – bottom.

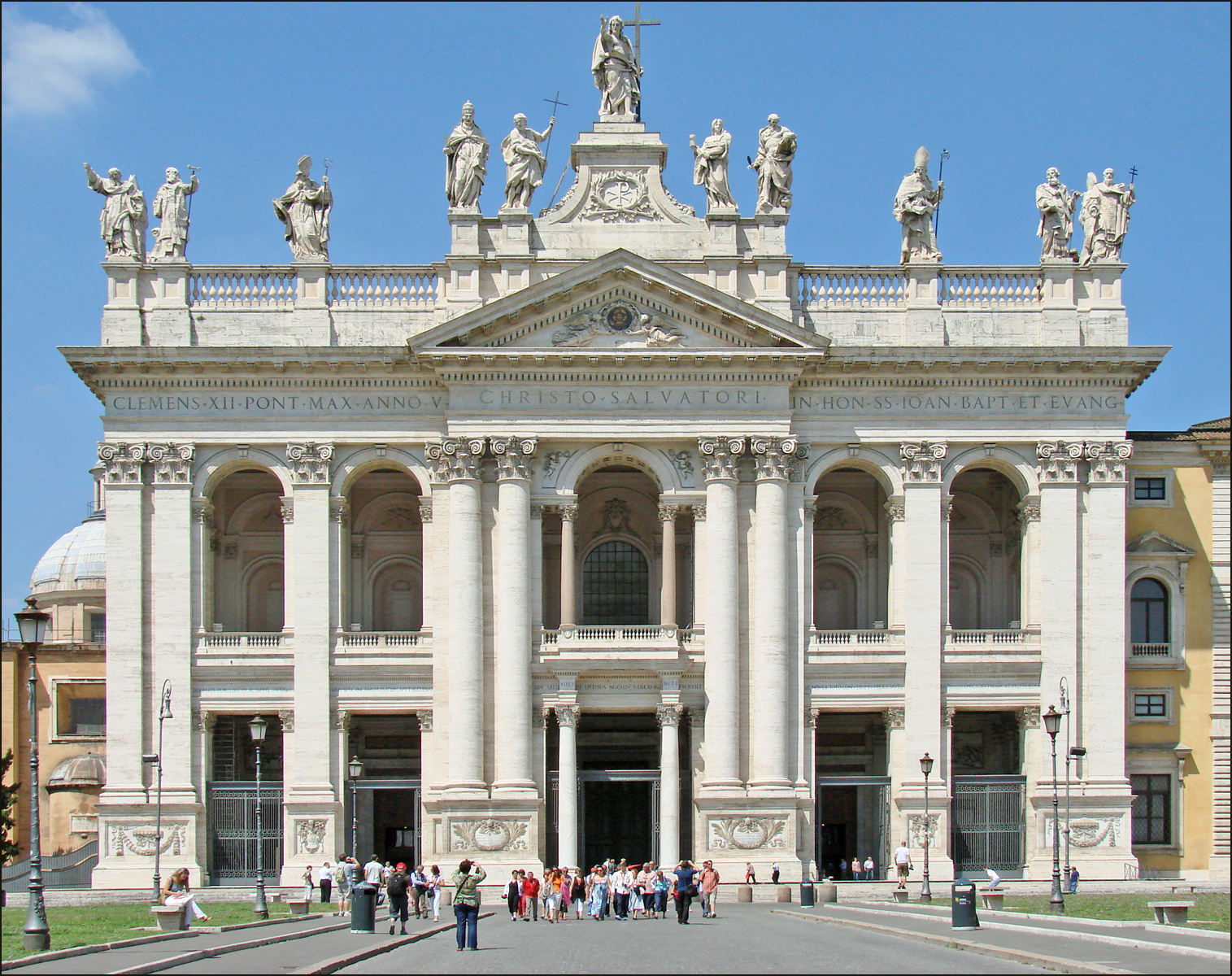
Basilica of St. John Lateran Rome

Rev. Michael Walsh published the following inscription translation in 1961.

"Charles Raynal McRaynal, son of Maurus Raynal, born of a renowned family in Ireland; well adorned with the gifts of body and mind (and) very skilled in both laws. Archdeacon of Kells of the Diocese of Meath; Counsellor of his illustrious friend Thomas of Kildare; Messenger sent by his superior to Paul III Supreme Pontiff about serious matters especially those pertaining to the Christian Redemption. While he carried out these things in Rome with the greatest faith and integrity. on the day before he was set over the churches Elphin and Clonmaicnois, on account of his merits by the same Paul, Supreme Pontiff. he was suddenly carried off by an incurable fever to the greatest grief of all. He was buried on the Ides of July in the year of Our Lord 1535, in the 38th year of his age.".

— Rev Michael Walsh, Ríocht na Midhe: The Magranell slab in the basilica of St. John Lateran, Rome. Illustr., 1961, pages 46.

Another translation by Senan Furlong O.S.B. was published by Conleth Manning in 2010.

"Sacred to the greatest God – for Charles Raynal MacRaynald, son of Maurus Raynal; Irish by nation, descended from a distinguished family; a just man, well learned, endowed with the qualities of body and soul, archdeacon of Kells in the church of Meath, counsellor to the illustrious Thomas, earl of Kildare, and envoy sent to Pope Paul III, supreme pontiff and successor to the prince of the Apostles(?), concerning very grave matters pertaining especially to the redemption of Christians (?); while with upmost integrity and faith he was conducting these affairs in Rome, on the day before he was to be placed in charge as bishop of the churches of Elphin and Cluonensis, on account of his merits, by the same Paul, supreme pontiff, he was swept away quickly by an incurable fever, to the greatest sorrow of all, and was interred on the ides of July in the year of Christ 1535, aged 38. Therefore, not without tears and with the ... of love, Fergal Raynal took care to make (this monument) for this well-meriting ...".

— Conleth Manning, The grave-slab of Charles Reynolds in Rome, 2010, pages 23.

Both translations reveal he was buried on the ides of July (15 July) 1535, aged thirty-eight years. He died the day before he was to be ordained Bishop of Elphin and "Cluonensis" (Clonmacnoise or Clonfert). It praises his memory, whilst recording he was an Irishman, born of a noble family, and competent in civil and canon law. Charles belonged to the Mac Raghnaills, a Gaelic sept of Muintir Eolais, now forming part of southern county Leitrim. The inscription names his father as Maurus Mac Raghnaill, canon of the Augustinian Priory at Mohill. (Note: Papal records name Maurus Magrannel as canon in the church of Ardagh, at Mohill on 25 March 1489, 1497, and 1508. Manning noted the "Dictionary of Irish biography (viii, 449) claims Reynolds was a 'member of a prominent ecclesiastical family, which may have been a branch of the Gaelic Irish Mac Raghnaill dynasty that moved at some time into the Pale', but remarks that "no evidence is presented or reference given" for the claim.) The Fergal 'Raynal' named in the last section is probably a relative of Charles.

== See also ==
- Eustace Chapuys
- John Fisher
- Monastery of Mohill-Manchan
- Thomas More

== Notes and references ==
=== References ===
- abbé Mac-Geoghegan, James (1844), The History of Ireland, Ancient and Modern: Taken from the Most Authentic Records, and Dedicated to the Irish Brigade (Translated by Patrick O'Kelly ed.), J. Duffy
- Annála Connacht (CELT edition)
- O'Donovan, John, ed. (1856). Annála Rioghachta Éireann. Annals of the Kingdom of Ireland by the Four Masters ... with a Translation and Copious Notes. 7 vols. Translated by O'Donovan (2nd ed.). Dublin: Royal Irish Academy. CELT editions. Full scans at Internet Archive: Vol. 1; Vol. 2; Vol. 3; Vol. 4; Vol. 5; Vol. 6; Indices.
  For additional information on this work and translation of it: Hondelink, Floortje; McDonald, Orla, eds. (2008) [2002]. "Background details and bibliographic information: Annals of the Four Masters". CELT: Corpus of Electronic Texts (2nd ed.). University College, Cork.
- Annals of Ulster (CELT edition)
- Bradshaw, Brendan; Duffy, Eamon (1989), Humanism, Reform and the Reformation: The Career of Bishop John Fisher, CUP Archive, p. 163, ISBN 9780521340342
- Burnet, Gilbert; et al. (Burnet) (1865), History of the Reformation of the Church of England (Volume 4 ed.)
- Byrne, Frances (2002), Charles Reynolds grave slab (talk on 15th September 2002 ed.), Meath Archaeological & History Society
- Catholic Church (1857), Bullarum, diplomatum et privilegiorum sanctorum Romanorum pontificum Taurinensis (Volume VI ed.), Augustae Taurinorum, Seb. Franco et Henrico Dalmazzo editoribus
- Chrimes, S.B (1999). Henry VII. Vol. The English Monarchs Series (reprint ed.). Yale University Press. ISBN 0300212941.
- Churchill, Winston (1966), The New World, History of the English Speaking Peoples, vol. 2, Cassell and Company, ISBN 0-553-14416-2
- Collins, Arthur; Brydges, Egerton (1812), Collins's peerage of England; genealogical, biographical, and historical (PDF) (Volume 6 ed.), F. C. and J. Rivington, Otridge and son [etc., etc.], p. 149,151
- Costello, Michael A.; Coleman, Ambrose; Flood, William Henry Grattan (1909), De annatis Hiberniæ : a calendar of the first fruits' fees levied on papal appointments to benefices in Ireland A.D. 1400 to 1535 extracted from the Vatican and other roman archives with copious topographical notes together with summaries of papal rescripts relating to benefices in Ireland and biographical notes of the bishops of Irish sees during the same period (PDF), pp. 160, 165
- Cox, Richard (1689), Hibernia anglicana, or, The history of Ireland, from the conquest thereof by the English, to this present time with an introductory discourse touching the ancient state of that kingdom and a new and exact map of the same, London: H. Clark, p. 223
- Cronin, Mike; O'Callaghan, Liam (2014), A history of Ireland, vol. Palgrave Essential Histories series (2nd revised ed.), Macmillan International Higher Education, ISBN 978-1137426055
- D'Alton, John (1845), The history of Ireland, from the earliest period to the year 1245, when the Annals of Boyle, which are adopted and embodied as the running text authority, terminate: with a brief essay on the native annalists, and other sources for illustrating Ireland, and full statistical and historical notices of the barony of Boyle (PDF), Dublin, Pub. by the author
- Ellis, Stephen G. (1976), "The Kildare Rebellion and the early Henrican reformation" (PDF), ARAN (Access to Research at NUI Galway), The Historical Journal, 19, 4, p. 825
- Gairdner, James (1886), "Henry VIII: August 1535, 26–31", Letters and Papers, Foreign and Domestic, Henry VIII, Volume 9: August–December 1535, Institute of Historical Research
- Gairdner, James (1893), "Henry VIII: December 1538 16–20", Letters and Papers, Foreign and Domestic, Henry VIII, Volume 13 Part 2: August–December 1538, Institute of Historical Research
- Gwynn, Aubrey (1946), W. Tempest (ed.), The Medieval Province of Armagh, 1470–1545, Dundalk: Dundalgan Press
- Heal, Felicity (2005), Reformation in Britain and Ireland, vol. Oxford history of the Christian Church (illustrated, reprint ed.), Oxford University Press, ISBN 0-19-928015-0
- Manning, Conleth (2010), "The grave-slab of Charles Reynolds in Rome", The Journal of the Royal Society of Antiquaries of Ireland, 140: 22–27, JSTOR 24395863
- McGuire, James; Quinn, James, eds. (2009), Dictionary of Irish Biography, From the Earliest Times to the Year 2002, vol. 8, Cambridge University Press, p. 499, ISBN 978-0-521-63331-4
- Morrin, James (1861), Calendar of the Patent and Close Rolls of Chancery in Ireland, of the Reigns of Henry VIII., Edward VI., Mary, and Elizabeth: 1514–1575, vol. 1, Ireland Chancery, A. Thom
- Murray, James (2011). Enforcing the English Reformation in Ireland: Clerical Resistance and Political Conflict in the Diocese of Dublin, 1534–1590. Vol. Cambridge Studies in Early Modern British History (reissue ed.). Cambridge University Press. ISBN 978-0521369947.
- Record Commission (1830), State papers, published under the authority of His Majesty's Commission. King Henry the Eighth (PDF) (Volume 2 ed.), University of California Libraries: London: G. Eyre and A. Strahan, printers to the King's Most Excellent Majesty, etc., p. 315
- Scarisbrick, J. J. (1997), Henry VIII (2nd ed.), Yale University Press, ISBN 0-300-07158-2
- Smith, Charles (1774), The Ancient and Present State of the County and City of Waterford (2nd digital ed.)
- Walsh, Rev Michael (1961), Ríocht na Midhe: The Magranell slab in the basilica of St. John Lateran, Rome. Illustr., vol. II, Ríocht na Midhe: records of Meath Archaeological and Historical Society, p. 46 (subscription required)
