= Treason Act 1536 =

Act of the Parliament of England

Attainder of Lord Thomas Howard Act 1536
- Act of Parliament
- Parliament of England
- Long title: An Acte concernyng the Attaynder of the Lord Thomas Howard.
- Citation: 28 Hen. 8. c. 24 (Note: This is the citation in The Statutes of the Realm.); 28 Hen. 8. c. 7 Pr. (Note: This is the citation in The Statutes at Large.)
- Territorial extent: England and Wales

Dates
- Royal assent: 18 July 1536
- Commencement: 8 June 1536 (Note: Start of session.)
- Repealed: 16 June 1977

Other legislation
- Amended by: Treason Act 1547
- Repealed by: Statute Law (Repeals) Act 1977

Status: Repealed

Text of statute as originally enacted

The Treason Act 1536 (28 Hen. 8. c. 24) was an act of the Parliament passed during the reign of Henry VIII.

Two clauses of the Attainder of Lord Thomas Howard Act 1536 made it high treason to marry or become engaged to the King's children, sisters, paternal aunts, or his nieces or nephews without the King's written permission, or "to deflower any of them being unmarried". It was also treason for any of the same relatives to participate in such treason.

== Subsequent developments ==
The whole act was effectively repealed by the Treason Act 1547 (1 Edw. 6. c. 12) in the first year of the reign of Henry's successor, Edward VI.

The whole act was repealed by section 1(1) of, and part IV of schedule 1 to, the Statute Law (Repeals) Act 1977, which came into force on 16 June 1977.

== See also ==
- Thomas Wyatt
