= Ecclesiastical Commissioners =

19th- and 20th-century Church of England body

The Ecclesiastical Commissioners were a body corporate in England and Wales, whose full title was Ecclesiastical and Church Estates Commissioners for England. The commissioners were authorised to determine the distribution of revenues of the Church of England, and they made extensive changes in how revenues were distributed. The modern successor body thereof are the Church Commissioners.

== History ==
Ecclesiastical Commissioners Act 1836 (Note: The citation of this act by this short title was authorised by section 1 of, and the first schedule to, the Short Titles Act 1896. Due to the repeal of those provisions it is now authorised by section 19(2) of the Interpretation Act 1978.)
- Act of Parliament
- Parliament of the United Kingdom
- Long title: An Act for carrying into Effect the Reports of the Commissioners appointed to consider the State of the Established Church in England and Wales, with reference to Ecclesiastical Duties and Revenues, so far as they relate to Episcopal Dioceses, Revenues, and Patronage.
- Citation: 6 & 7 Will. 4. c. 77
- Territorial extent: United Kingdom

Dates
- Royal assent: 13 August 1836
- Commencement: 13 August 1836 (Note: The Acts of Parliament (Commencement) Act 1793.)
- Repealed: 1 July 2018
Other legislation
| Amended by | Sodor and Man Act 1838; Pluralities Act 1838; Ecclesiastical Commissioners Act 1850; False Personation Act 1874; Statute Law Revision Act 1874; Municipal Corporations Act 1882; Statute Law Revision Act 1890; Charities Act 1960; Statute Law (Repeals) Act 1981; Statute Law (Repeals) Act 1993; Statute Law (Repeals) Act 2004 |
| Repealed by | Statute Law (Repeals) Measure 2018 |

Status: Repealed

Text of statute as originally enacted

Revised text of statute as amended

Their appointment was one of the results of the vigorous movements for the reform of public institutions which followed the Reform Act 1832. Under the leadership of Prime Minister Robert Peel in 1835, two commissions were appointed to consider the state of the several dioceses of England and Wales, with reference to the amount of their revenues and the more equal distribution of episcopal duties, and the prevention of the necessity of attaching by commendam to bishoprics certain benefices with cure of souls; and to consider also the state of the several cathedral and collegiate churches in England and Wales, with a view to the suggestion of such measures as might render them conducive to the efficiency of the established church, and to provide for the best mode of providing for the cure of souls, with special reference to the residence of the clergy on their respective benefices. And it was enacted by the Vacant Ecclesiastical Dignities, etc. Act 1835 (5 & 6 Will. 4. c. 30) that during the existence of the commission the profits of dignities and benefices without cure of souls becoming vacant should be paid over to the treasurer of Queen Anne's Bounty. In consequence of the recommendation of these commissioners, a permanent commission was appointed by the Ecclesiastical Commissioners Act 1836 (6 & 7 Will. 4. c. 77) for the purpose of preparing and laying before the king in council such schemes as should appear to them to be best adapted for carrying into effect the alterations suggested in the report of the original commission and recited in the act. The new commission was constituted a corporation with power to purchase and hold lands for the purposes of the act, notwithstanding the statutes of mortmain. The first members of the commission were the Archbishop of Canterbury, the Archbishop of York, and three bishops, the Lord Chancellor and the principal officers of state, and three laymen named in the act.

Ecclesiastical Commissioners Act 1840
- Act of Parliament
- Parliament of the United Kingdom
- Long title: An Act to carry into effect, with certain modifications, the Fourth Report of the Commissioners of Ecclesiastical Duties and Revenues.
- Citation: 3 & 4 Vict. c. 113
- Territorial extent: United Kingdom

Dates
- Royal assent: 11 August 1840
- Commencement: 11 August 1840
Other legislation
| Amended by | Ecclesiastical Commissioners Act 1841; Ecclesiastical Houses of Residence Act 1842; Welsh Cathedrals Act 1843; Ecclesiastical Commissioners Act 1850; Ecclesiastical Commissioners Act 1860; Ecclesiastical Commissioners Act 1866; Statute Law Revision (No. 2) Act 1874; Statute Law Revision (No. 2) Act 1890; Statute Law Revision Act 1893; Universities and College Estates Act 1925; Ecclesiastical Commissioners (Sodor and Man) Measure 1930; Cathedrals Measure 1931; Ecclesiastical Commissioners (Curate Grants) Measure 1946; Church Commissioners Measure 1947; Archdeaconries (Augmentation) Measure 1953; Charities Act 1960; Cathedrals Measure 1963; Statute Law Revision Act 1964; Statute Law Revision Act 1966; Pastoral Measure 1968; Westminster Abbey and St. Margaret Westminster Act 1972; Statute Law (Repeals) Act 1974; Endowments and Glebe Measure 1976; Statute Law (Repeals) Act 1977; Patronage (Benefices) Measure 1986; Statute Law (Repeals) Act 1993; Church of England (Miscellaneous Provisions) Measure 1995; Church of England (Miscellaneous Provisions) Measure 2000; Statute Law (Repeals) Act 2004; Church of England (Miscellaneous Provisions) Measure 2014; Statute Law (Repeals) Measure 2018; Cathedrals Measure 2021; Church of England (Miscellaneous Provisions) Measure 2024 |

Status: Amended

Text of statute as originally enacted

Revised text of statute as amended

Text of the Ecclesiastical Commissioners Act 1840 as in force today (including any amendments) within the United Kingdom, from legislation.gov.uk.

The constitution of the commission was amended by the Ecclesiastical Commissioners Act 1840 (3 & 4 Vict. c. 113) and subsequent acts, to consist of the two archbishops, all the bishops, the deans of Canterbury, St Paul's, and Westminster, the Lord Chancellor, the Lord President of the Council, the First Lord of the Treasury, the Chancellor of the Exchequer, the Home Secretary, the Lord Chief Justice, the Master of the Rolls, two judges of the admiralty division, and certain laymen appointed by the Crown and by the archbishop of Canterbury. The lay commissioners were required to be members of the Church of England, and to subscribe a declaration to that effect. The Crown also appointed two laymen as church estates commissioners, and the archbishop of Canterbury one. These three were the joint treasurers of the commission, and constituted, along with two members appointed by the commission; the church estates committee, charged with all business relating to the sale, purchase, exchange, letting or management of any lands, tithes or hereditaments. The commission had power to make inquiries and examine witnesses on oath. Five commissioners were a quorum for the transaction of business, provided two of them were church estates commissioners; two ecclesiastical commissioners at least had to be present at any proceeding under the common seal, and if only two were present they could demand its postponement to a subsequent meeting. The schemes of the commission having, after due notice to persons affected thereby, been laid before the king-in-council, could be ratified by orders, specifying the times when they should take effect, and such orders when published in the London Gazette had the same force and effect as acts of Parliament.

The recommendations of the commission recited in the Ecclesiastical Commissioners Act 1836 are too numerous to be given here. They include an extensive rearrangement of the dioceses, equalization of episcopal income, providing residences, etc. By the Ecclesiastical Commissioners Act 1840 the fourth report of the original commissioners, dealing chiefly with cathedral and collegiate churches, was carried into effect, a large number of canonries being suspended, and sinecure benefices and dignities suppressed.

The emoluments of these suppressed or suspended offices, and the surplus income of the episcopal sees, constitute the fund at the disposal of the commissioners. By the Ecclesiastical Commissioners Act 1860 (23 & 24 Vict. c. 124), on the avoidance of any bishopric or archbishopric, all the land and emoluments of the see, except the patronage and lands attached to houses of residence, become, by order in council, vested in the commissioners, who may, however, reassign to the see so much of the land as may be sufficient to secure the net annual income named for it by statute or order. All the profits and emoluments of the suspended canonries, etc., pass over to the commissioners, as well as the separate estates of those deaneries and canonries which are not suspended. Out of this fund the expenses of the commission are to be paid, and the residue is to be devoted to increasing the efficiency of the church by the augmentation of the smaller bishoprics and of poor livings, the endowment of new churches, and employment of additional ministers.

The substitution of one central corporation for the many local and independent corporations of the church, so far at least as the management of property is concerned, was a constitutional change of great importance, and the effect of it undoubtedly was to correct the anomalous distribution of ecclesiastical revenues by equalising incomes and abolishing sinecures. At the same time it was regarded as having made a serious breach in the legal theory of ecclesiastical property. The important principle, says H. W. Cripps, on which the inviolability of the church establishment depends, that the church generally possesses no property as a corporation, or which is applicable to general purposes, but that such particular ecclesiastical corporation, whether aggregate or sole, has its property separate, distinct and inalienable, according to the intention of the original endowment, was given up without an effort to defend it.

== Legislation ==
The Ecclesiastical Commissioners Acts 1840 to 1885 is the collective title of the following acts:

- The Ecclesiastical Commissioners Act 1840 (3 & 4 Vict. c. 113)
- The Ecclesiastical Commissioners Act 1841 (4 & 5 Vict. c. 39)
- The Ecclesiastical Commissioners Act 1850 (13 & 14 Vict. c. 94)
- The Ecclesiastical Commissioners Act 1860 (23 & 24 Vict. c. 124)
- The Ecclesiastical Commissioners Act 1866 (29 & 30 Vict. c. 111)
- The Ecclesiastical Commissioners Act 1873 (36 & 37 Vict. c. 64)
- The Ecclesiastical Commissioners Act 1875 (38 & 39 Vict. c. 71)
- The Ecclesiastical Commissioners Act 1885 (48 & 49 Vict. c. 31)

== See also ==
- Religion in Victorian England
