= List of acts of the Parliament of England from 1536 =

This is a list of acts of the Parliament of England for the year 1536.

For acts passed during the period 1707–1800, see the list of acts of the Parliament of Great Britain. See also the list of acts of the Parliament of Scotland, and the list of acts of the Parliament of Ireland.

For acts passed from 1801 onwards, see the list of acts of the Parliament of the United Kingdom. For acts of the devolved parliaments and assemblies in the United Kingdom, see the list of acts of the Scottish Parliament, the list of acts of the Northern Ireland Assembly, and the list of acts and measures of Senedd Cymru; see also the list of acts of the Parliament of Northern Ireland.

For medieval statutes, etc. that are not considered to be acts of Parliament, see the list of English statutes.

See also the List of ordinances and acts of the Parliament of England, 1642–1660 for ordinances and acts passed by the Long Parliament and other bodies without royal assent, and which were not considered to be valid legislation following the Restoration in 1660.

The number shown after each act's title is its chapter number. Acts are cited using this number, preceded by the years of the reign during which the relevant parliamentary session was held; thus the Union with Ireland Act 1800 is cited as "39 & 40 Geo. 3. c. 67", meaning the 67th act passed during the session that started in the 39th year of the reign of George III and which finished in the 40th year of that reign. The modern convention is to use Arabic numerals in citations (thus "41 Geo. 3" rather than "41 Geo. III"). Acts of the last session of the Parliament of Great Britain and the first session of the Parliament of the United Kingdom are both cited as "41 Geo. 3".

Acts passed by the Parliament of England did not have a short title; however, some of these acts have subsequently been given a short title by acts of the Parliament of the United Kingdom, such as the Short Titles Act 1896 (59 & 60 Vict. c. 14).

Acts passed by the Parliament of England were deemed to have come into effect on the first day of the session in which they were passed. Because of this, the years given in the list below may in fact be the year before a particular act was passed.

== 28 Hen. 8 ==
The 6th Parliament of King Henry VIII, which met from 8 June 1536 until 18 July 1536.

This session was also traditionally cited as 28 H. 8.

Note that c. 24 was traditionally listed as two separate acts, c. 18 and c. 7; and cc. 18–52 were traditionally cited as private acts cc. 1–35.

Short title	Citation	Royal assent
Long title
Abjuration (Benefit of Clergy) Act 1536 (repealed)	28 Hen. 8. c. 1	18 July 1536
An Act that Felons abjuring for Petit Treason, Murder or Felony, shall not be admitted to the Benefit of their Clergy. (Repealed by Statute Law Revision Act 1863 (26 & 27 Vict. c. 125))
Embezzlement Act 1536 (repealed)	28 Hen. 8. c. 2	18 July 1536
An Act for continuing of two Statutes made in the last Parliament, touching such as go away with Caskets, Jewels, Goods or Plate of their Masters. (Repealed by Statute Law Revision Act 1863 (26 & 27 Vict. c. 125))
Wales Act 1536 (repealed)	28 Hen. 8. c. 3	18 July 1536
An Act giving the King's Highness Authority newly to allot the Townships in the Shires and Marches of Wales at any Time within three Years next ensuing. (Repealed by Statute Law Revision Act 1863 (26 & 27 Vict. c. 125))
Cloths Act 1536 (repealed)	28 Hen. 8. c. 4	18 July 1536
An Act repealing the Statute lately made for the bringing in of Doulas and Lockerams. (Repealed by Statute Law Revision Act 1863 (26 & 27 Vict. c. 125))
Apprentices Act 1536 (repealed)	28 Hen. 8. c. 5	18 July 1536
An Act for avoiding of Exactions taken upon Prentices in the Cities, Boroughs and Towns Corporate. (Repealed by Statute Law Revision Act 1887 (50 & 51 Vict. c. 59), Statute Law Revision Act 1948 (11 & 12 Geo. 6. c. 62) and Statute Law (Repeals) Act 1969 (c. 52))
Continuance of Laws Act 1536 (repealed)	28 Hen. 8. c. 6	18 July 1536
An Act made for continuing of the Statutes for Beggars and Vagabonds; and against Conveyance of Horses and Mares out of this Realm; against Welshmen making Affrays in the Counties of Hereford, Gloucester and Salop; and against the Vice of Buggery. (Repealed by Statute Law Revision Act 1863 (26 & 27 Vict. c. 125))
Succession to the Crown Act 1536 or the Succession to the Crown (Marriage) Act 1536 or the Second Succession Act (repealed)	28 Hen. 8. c. 7	18 July 1536
An Act for the Establishment of the Succession of the Imperial Crown of this Realm. (Repealed by Legitimacy of the Queen, etc. Act 1553 (1 Mar. Sess. 2. c. 1), See of Rome Act 1554 (1 & 2 Ph. & M. c. 8), Act of Supremacy 1558 (1 Eliz. 1. c. 1) and Statute Law Revision Act 1948 (11 & 12 Geo. 6. c. 62))
Continuance of Laws (No. 2) Act 1536 (repealed)	28 Hen. 8. c. 8	18 July 1536
An Act for Continuance of the Statutes against the Carriage of Brass, Laten and Copper out of this Realm; and for making of Cables and Ropes; for the Winding of Wools, and against killing of weanlings under the age of two years. (Repealed by Statute Law Revision Act 1863 (26 & 27 Vict. c. 125))
Continuance of Laws (No. 3) Act 1536 (repealed)	28 Hen. 8. c. 9	18 July 1536
An Act for Continuance of the Statutes of Perjury; for making of Jayles; for Pewterers; and for sowing of Flax and Hemp. (Repealed by Statute Law Revision Act 1863 (26 & 27 Vict. c. 125))
See of Rome Act 1536 (repealed)	28 Hen. 8. c. 10	18 July 1536
An Act extinguishing the Authority of the Bishop of Rome. (Repealed by Second Statute of Repeal (1 & 2 Ph. & M. c. 8))
Tithe Act 1536 (repealed)	28 Hen. 8. c. 11	18 July 1536
An Act for Restitution of the First Fruits in Time of Vacation to the next Incumbent. (Repealed by Statute Law (Repeals) Measure 2018 (No. 1))
Palace of Westminster Act 1536	28 Hen. 8. c. 12	18 July 1536
An Act declaring the Limits of the King's Palace of Westminster.
Clergy Act 1536 (repealed)	28 Hen. 8. c. 13	18 July 1536
An Act compelling Spiritual Persons to keep Residence upon their Benefices. (Repealed by Residence on Benefices, etc. (England) Act 1817 (57 Geo. 3. c. 99))
Wines Act 1536 (repealed)	28 Hen. 8. c. 14	18 July 1536
An Act limiting the Prices of Wines. (Repealed by Statute Law Revision Act 1863 (26 & 27 Vict. c. 125))
Offences at Sea Act 1536 (repealed)	28 Hen. 8. c. 15	18 July 1536
An Act for Punishment of Pirates and Robbers of the Sea. (Repealed by Criminal Law Act 1967 (c. 58))
Ecclesiastical Licences Act 1536 (repealed)	28 Hen. 8. c. 16	18 July 1536
An Act for the Release of such as have obtained pretended Licences and Dispensations from The See of Rome. (Repealed by Statute Law Revision Act 1948 (11 & 12 Geo. 6. c. 62), Criminal Law Act 1967 (c. 58) and Statute Law (Repeals) Act 1969 (c. 52))
Acts During King's Nonage Act 1536 (repealed)	28 Hen. 8. c. 17	18 July 1536
An Act giving authority to such as shall succeed to the Crown of this Realm when they shall come to the age of xxiv years to make frustrate such acts as shall be made before in their time. (Repealed by Minority of Successor to Crown Act 1750 (24 Geo. 2. c. 24))
Attainder of the Earl of Kildare Act 1536 (repealed)	28 Hen. 8. c. 18 (Note: This is the citation in The Statutes of the Realm.); 28 Hen. 8. c. 1 Pr. (Note: This is the citation in The Statutes at Large.)	18 July 1536
An Acte concernyng the Attaynder of Thomas Fittzgaralde and of his five Uncles. (Repealed by Statute Law (Repeals) Act 1977 (c. 18))
Assurance of Lands to St. Saviour's Bermondsey, to King Act 1536 (repealed)	28 Hen. 8. c. 19; 28 Hen. 8. c. 2 Pr.	18 July 1536
An Act concerning an Exchange of Lands between the King's Majesty and the Abbot of Barmesey. (Repealed by Statute Law (Repeals) Act 1978 (c. 45))
Assurance of Lands to Dame Grace Parker Act 1536 (repealed)	28 Hen. 8. c. 20; 28 Hen. 8. c. 3 Pr.	18 July 1536
An Act for Assurance of certain Lands to Sir Henry Parker and Grace his Wife. (Repealed by Statute Law (Repeals) Act 1978 (c. 45))
Exchange of Lands between the King and Prior of St. John of Jerusalem Act 1536 (repealed)	28 Hen. 8. c. 21; 28 Hen. 8. cc. 4 Pr., 38 Pr.	18 July 1536
An Act concerning an Exchange of certain Lands between the King's Highness and the prior of St. John's Jerusalem in England. (Repealed by Statute Law (Repeals) Act 1978 (c. 45))
Assurance of Lands of Earl of Warwick to King Act 1536 (repealed)	28 Hen. 8. c. 22; 28 Hen. 8. c. 5 Pr.	18 July 1536
An Act concerning the Assurance of the Earldom of Warwyke to the King's Highness. (Repealed by Statute Law (Repeals) Act 1978 (c. 45))
Pension to late Bishop of Chichester Act 1536 (repealed)	28 Hen. 8. c. 23; 28 Hen. 8. c. 6 Pr.	18 July 1536
An Act concerning the Assurance of a Pension Yearly unto Robert Shurburne, late Bishop of Chichester. (Repealed by Statute Law Revision Act 1948 (11 & 12 Geo. 6. c. 62))
Attainder of Lord Thomas Howard Act 1536 (repealed)	28 Hen. 8. c. 24; 28 Hen. 8. c. 7 Pr.	18 July 1536
An Acte concernyng the Attaynder of the Lord Thomas Howard. (Repealed by Statute Law (Repeals) Act 1977 (c. 18))
Assurance of Lands to Lord Beauchamp Act 1536 (repealed)	28 Hen. 8. c. 25; 28 Hen. 8. c. 8 Pr.	18 July 1536
An Act concerning the Assurance of certain Lands unto the Viscount Beuchampe. (Repealed by Statute Law (Repeals) Act 1978 (c. 45))
Assurance of Lands at Kew to Lord Beauchamp Act 1536 (repealed)	28 Hen. 8. c. 26; 28 Hen. 8. c. 9 Pr.	18 July 1536
An Act concerning the Assurance of the House of Kewe to the Viscount Beuchamp. (Repealed by Statute Law (Repeals) Act 1978 (c. 45))
Church of Elsing Spital, Parish Church of St Alphege Act 1536 (repealed)	28 Hen. 8. c. 27; 28 Hen. 8. c. 10 Pr.	18 July 1536
An Act concerning the Church of Elsynge Spittell. (Repealed by Statute Law (Repeals) Act 2013 (c. 2))
Assurance of Richard's castle to John Onley Act 1536 (repealed)	28 Hen. 8. c. 28; 28 Hen. 8. c. 11 Pr.	18 July 1536
An Act concerning the Assurance of the Moiety of Richards Castell to John Only and his Heirs. (Repealed by Statute Law (Repeals) Act 1978 (c. 45))
Exchange of Lands between the King and Abbot of Westminster Act 1536 (repealed)	28 Hen. 8. c. 29; 28 Hen. 8. c. 12 Pr.	18 July 1536
An Act concerning an Exchange between the King's Highness and the Abbot of Westm. for Covent Garden. (Repealed by Statute Law (Repeals) Act 1978 (c. 45))
Assurance of Stanton Barrey to King Act 1536 (repealed)	28 Hen. 8. c. 30; 28 Hen. 8. c. 13 Pr.	18 July 1536
An Act concerning the Assurance of Stawnton Barreye to the King's Grace. (Repealed by Statute Law (Repeals) Act 1978 (c. 45))
St. Margaret's Southwark Act 1536	28 Hen. 8. c. 31; 28 Hen. 8. c. 14 Pr.	18 July 1536
An act for enlarging of St. Margaret's church-yard in Southwark.
Assurance of lands to King from Sir William Essex and others Act 1536 (repealed)	28 Hen. 8. c. 32; 28 Hen. 8. c. 15 Pr.	18 July 1536
An act concerning the assurance of certain lands unto the King and his heirs, from Sir William Essex and others. (Repealed by Statute Law (Repeals) Act 1978 (c. 45))
Exchange between the King and Bishop of Durham Act 1536 (repealed)	28 Hen. 8. c. 33; 28 Hen. 8. c. 16 Pr.	18 July 1536
An Act concerning the Assurance of Durham Place to the King's Highness. (Repealed by Statute Law (Repeals) Act 1978 (c. 45))
Assurance of Baynard's Castle to Duke of Richmond Act 1536 (repealed)	28 Hen. 8. c. 34; 28 Hen. 8. c. 17 Pr.	18 July 1536
An Act concerning the Assurance of Baynard's Castell unto the Duke of Richmond. (Repealed by Statute Law (Repeals) Act 1978 (c. 45))
Exchange of Lands between the King and Lord Sandys Act 1536 (repealed)	28 Hen. 8. c. 35; 28 Hen. 8. c. 18 Pr.	18 July 1536
An Act touching an Exchange of Lands between the King's Highness and the Lord Sandes. (Repealed by Statute Law (Repeals) Act 1978 (c. 45))
Award to Sir Adrian Fortescue and Sir Walter Stonor Act 1536 (repealed)	28 Hen. 8. c. 36; 28 Hen. 8. c. 19 Pr.	18 July 1536
An Act, ratifying the Arbitriment made by our Sovereign Lord the King, between Sir Walter Stoner, and others. (Repealed by Statute Law (Repeals) Act 1978 (c. 45))
Marriage of Richard Devereux Act 1536 (repealed)	28 Hen. 8. c. 37; 28 Hen. 8. c. 20 Pr.	18 July 1536
An Act concerning a Marriage between the Lord Ferrers's Son and Heir, and the Earl of Huntyngton's Daughter. (Repealed by Statute Law (Repeals) Act 1978 (c. 45))
Assurance of Manors of Southwark and Parysgarden Hyde to the Queen Act 1536 (repealed)	28 Hen. 8. c. 38; 28 Hen. 8. c. 21 Pr.	18 July 1536
An Act concerning the Assurance of certain Lands to the Queen. (Repealed by Statute Law (Repeals) Act 1978 (c. 45))
Assurance of lands of Earldom of March to King Act 1536 (repealed)	28 Hen. 8. c. 39; 28 Hen. 8. c. 22 Pr.	18 July 1536
An Act concerning Assurance of the Earldom of Marche to the King's Majesty. (Repealed by Statute Law (Repeals) Act 1978 (c. 45))
Assurance of Manor of Kyrteling to Edward North Act 1536 (repealed)	28 Hen. 8. c. 40; 28 Hen. 8. c. 23 Pr.	18 July 1536
An Act concerning the Assurance of the Manor of Kyrtelynge to Edward North and his Heirs. (Repealed by Statute Law (Repeals) Act 1978 (c. 45))
Assurance of Manor of Birmingham to King Act 1536 (repealed)	28 Hen. 8. c. 41; 28 Hen. 8. c. 24 Pr.	18 July 1536
An Act concerning the Assurance of the Manor of Birmyngeham to the King's Majesty. (Repealed by Statute Law (Repeals) Act 1978 (c. 45))
Exchange of lands, King and Abbot of Abingdon Act 1536 (repealed)	28 Hen. 8. c. 42; 28 Hen. 8. c. 25 Pr.	18 July 1536
An Act touching an Exchange of Lands between the King's Highness and the Abbot of Abyngden. (Repealed by Statute Law (Repeals) Act 1978 (c. 45))
Assurance of lands to Thomas Jermyn Act 1536 (repealed)	28 Hen. 8. c. 43; 28 Hen. 8. c. 26 Pr.	18 July 1536
An Act touching the Assurance of the Manor of Hockham, to Thomas Jermyn and his Heirs. (Repealed by Statute Law (Repeals) Act 1978 (c. 45))
Assurance of Manor of Haslingfield to Prior of Charterhouse Act 1536 (repealed)	28 Hen. 8. c. 44; 28 Hen. 8. c. 27 Pr.	18 July 1536
An Act concerning the Assusance of the Manor of Haselyngfelde to the Prior and Convent of the Charter House, near London. (Repealed by Statute Law (Repeals) Act 1978 (c. 45))
Jointure of Queen Jane Act 1536 (repealed)	28 Hen. 8. c. 45; 28 Hen. 8. c. 28 Pr.	18 July 1536
An Act concerning the Assurance of the Queen's Jointure. (Repealed by Statute Law (Repeals) Act 1977 (c. 18))
Assurance of lands to Thomas Hatcliffe Act 1536 (repealed)	28 Hen. 8. c. 46; 28 Hen. 8. c. 29 Pr.	18 July 1536
An Act for assurance of certain lands unto Thomas Hatcliffe and to his heirs. (Repealed by Statute Law (Repeals) Act 1978 (c. 45))
Assurance of lands to John Gostwick Act 1536 (repealed)	28 Hen. 8. c. 47; 28 Hen. 8. c. 30 Pr.	18 July 1536
An Act concerning the Assurance of certain Lands unto John Gostwyk. (Repealed by Statute Law (Repeals) Act 1978 (c. 45))
Marriage of Lord Bulbeck Act 1536 (repealed)	28 Hen. 8. c. 48; 28 Hen. 8. c. 31 Pr.	18 July 1536
An Act concerning a Marriage between the Earl of Oxford's Son and Heir, and the Earl of Westm'land's Daughter. (Repealed by Statute Law (Repeals) Act 1978 (c. 45))
Exchange of lands, King and Abbot of Westminster Act 1536 (repealed)	28 Hen. 8. c. 49; 28 Hen. 8. c. 32 Pr.	18 July 1536
An act concerning an exchange of lands between the King and the abbot and covent of Westminster. (Repealed by Statute Law (Repeals) Act 1978 (c. 45))
Exchange of lands, King, Archbishop of Canterbury and Thomas Cromwell Act 1536 (repealed)	28 Hen. 8. c. 50; 28 Hen. 8. c. 33 Pr.	18 July 1536
An act concerning an exchange of lands between the King and the archbishop of Canterbury and Thomas Cromwell, esquire. (Repealed by Statute Law (Repeals) Act 1978 (c. 45))
Assurance of lands to Duchess of Suffolk Act 1536 (repealed)	28 Hen. 8. c. 51; 28 Hen. 8. c. 34 Pr.	18 July 1536
An act concerning the assurance of certain lands unto the lady Katherine duchess of Suffolk, in recompence of her jointure. (Repealed by Statute Law (Repeals) Act 1978 (c. 45))
Lands of Lord Rochford and other Persons Attainted Act 1536 (repealed)	28 Hen. 8. c. 52; 28 Hen. 8. c. 35 Pr.	18 July 1536
An Acte for persons to enjoye their lands and to have avauntage in the Lawe wherin the Lord Rocheford, Norreys and others, were seased. (Repealed by Statute Law (Repeals) Act 1977 (c. 18))

=== Sources ===
- "28° Hen. VIII". The Statutes of the Realm. Vol. 3: 1509 to 1547. pp. 651–716 – via HathiTrust.
- "Anno vicesimo octavo Henrici VIII". The Statutes at Large. Vol. 4 – 1 Richard III to 31 Henry VIII – 1483-4 to 1539. pp. 410–447 – via Internet Archive.
- "Anno vicesimo octavo Henrici VIII". The Statutes at Large. Vol. 4 – 1 Richard III to 31 Henry VIII – 1483-4 to 1539. pp. 410–447 – via Internet Archive.
- "Anno vicesimo octavo Henrici VIII". The Statutes at Large. Vol. 4 – 1 Richard III to 31 Henry VIII – 1483-4 to 1539. pp. 410–447 – via Internet Archive.
- Journal of the House of Lords. Vol. 1: 1509-1577. London: His Majesty's Stationery Office. 1830 – via British History Online.
- Chronological Table of and Index to the Statutes. Vol. 1: To the End of the Session 59 Vict. Sess. 2 (1895) (13th ed.). London: Her Majesty's Stationery Office. 1896. pp. 49–50 – via Google Books.
- Chronological Table of the Statutes: Covering the Period from 1235 to the End of 1971. London: Her Majesty's Stationery Office. 1972. pp. 46–47. ISBN 978-0-11-840096-1 – via Google Books.
- "Acts of the English Parliament from 1536". legislation.gov.uk. The National Archives.

== See also ==
- List of acts of the Parliament of England
