= List of acts of the Parliament of the United Kingdom from 1838 =

This is a complete list of acts of the Parliament of the United Kingdom for the year 1838.

Note that the first parliament of the United Kingdom was held in 1801; parliaments between 1707 and 1800 were either parliaments of Great Britain or of Ireland). For acts passed up until 1707, see the list of acts of the Parliament of England and the list of acts of the Parliament of Scotland. For acts passed from 1707 to 1800, see the list of acts of the Parliament of Great Britain. See also the list of acts of the Parliament of Ireland.

For acts of the devolved parliaments and assemblies in the United Kingdom, see the list of acts of the Scottish Parliament, the list of acts of the Northern Ireland Assembly, and the list of acts and measures of Senedd Cymru; see also the list of acts of the Parliament of Northern Ireland.

The number shown after each act's title is its chapter number. Acts passed before 1963 are cited using this number, preceded by the year(s) of the reign during which the relevant parliamentary session was held; thus the Union with Ireland Act 1800 is cited as "39 & 40 Geo. 3 c. 67", meaning the 67th act passed during the session that started in the 39th year of the reign of George III and which finished in the 40th year of that reign. Note that the modern convention is to use Arabic numerals in citations (thus "41 Geo. 3" rather than "41 Geo. III"). Acts of the last session of the Parliament of Great Britain and the first session of the Parliament of the United Kingdom are both cited as "41 Geo. 3". Acts passed from 1963 onwards are simply cited by calendar year and chapter number.

All modern acts have a short title, e.g. the Local Government Act 2003. Some earlier acts also have a short title given to them by later acts, such as by the Short Titles Act 1896.

== 1 & 2 Vict. ==
Continuing the first session of the 13th Parliament of the United Kingdom, which met from 15 November 1837 until 16 August 1838.

=== Public general acts ===
Short title	Citation	Royal assent
Long title
Duchess of Kent's Annuity Act 1838 (repealed)	1 & 2 Vict. c. 8	26 January 1838
An Act to enable Her Majesty to grant an annual Sum to Her Royal Highness Victoria Maria Louisa Duchess of Kent. (Repealed by Statute Law Revision Act 1874 (No. 2) (37 & 38 Vict. c. 96))
Lower Canada Government Act 1838 (repealed)	1 & 2 Vict. c. 9	10 February 1838
An Act to make temporary Provision for the Government of Lower Canada. (Repealed by British North America Act 1840 (3 & 4 Vict. c. 35))
Validity of Certain Contracts Act 1838 (repealed)	1 & 2 Vict. c. 10	20 February 1838
An Act to make good certain Contracts which have been or may be entered into by certain Banking and other Copartnerships. (Repealed by Statute Law Revision Act 1861 (24 & 25 Vict. c. 101))
Supply Act 1838 (repealed)	1 & 2 Vict. c. 11	26 February 1838
An Act to apply the Sum of Two Millions to the Service of the Year One thousand eight hundred and thirty-eight. (Repealed by Statute Law Revision Act 1874 (No. 2) (37 & 38 Vict. c. 96))
Exchequer Bills Act 1838 (repealed)	1 & 2 Vict. c. 12	26 February 1838
An Act for raising the Sum of Eleven millions four hundred and thirteen thousand seven hundred and fifty Pounds by Exchequer Bills, for the Service of the Year One thousand eight hundred and thirty-eight (Repealed by Statute Law Revision Act 1874 (No. 2) (37 & 38 Vict. c. 96))
Waterford House of Industry Act 1838 (repealed)	1 & 2 Vict. c. 13	26 February 1838
An Act to enable the Grand Juries of the County and County of the City of Waterford to make Presentments, at the Spring Assizes for the Year One thousand eight hundred and thirty-eight, for the House of Industry of the said Counties. (Repealed by Statute Law Revision Act 1874 (No. 2) (37 & 38 Vict. c. 96))
Criminal Lunatics Act 1838 (repealed)	1 & 2 Vict. c. 14	30 March 1838
An Act to repeal so much of an Act of the Thirty-ninth and Fortieth Years of King George the Third (Note: Criminal Lunatics Act 1800 (39 & 40 Geo. 3. c. 94)) as authorizes Magistrates to commit to Gaols or Houses of Correction Persons who are apprehended under Circumstances that denote a Derangement of Mind and a Purpose of committing a Crime; and to make other Provisions for the safe Custody of such Persons. (Repealed by National Health Service Act 1946 (9 & 10 Geo. 6. c. 81))
Declarations by Quakers, etc., on Acceptance of Offices Act 1838 (repealed)	1 & 2 Vict. c. 15	30 March 1838
An Act for the further Relief of Quakers, Moravians, and Separatists. (Repealed by Promissory Oaths Act 1871 (34 & 35 Vict. c. 48))
Indemnity Act 1838 (repealed)	1 & 2 Vict. c. 16	11 April 1838
An Act to indemnify such Persons in the United Kingdom as have omitted to qualify themselves for Offices and Employments, and for extending the Time limited for those Purposes respectively until the Twenty-fifth Day of March One thousand eight hundred and thirty-nine; and for the Relief of Clerks to Attornies and Solicitors in certain Cases. (Repealed by Promissory Oaths Act 1871 (34 & 35 Vict. c. 48))
Mutiny Act 1838 (repealed)	1 & 2 Vict. c. 17	11 April 1838
An Act for punishing Mutiny and Desertion, and for the better Payment of the Army and their Quarters. (Repealed by Statute Law Revision Act 1874 (No. 2) (37 & 38 Vict. c. 96))
Marine Mutiny Act 1838 (repealed)	1 & 2 Vict. c. 18	11 April 1838
An Act for the Regulation of Her Majesty's Royal Marine Forces while on Shore. (Repealed by Statute Law Revision Act 1874 (No. 2) (37 & 38 Vict. c. 96))
Abolition of Slavery Act 1838 (repealed)	1 & 2 Vict. c. 19	11 April 1838
An Act to amend the Act (Note: Slavery Abolition Act 1833 (3 & 4 Will. 4. c. 73)) for the Abolition of Slavery in the British Colonies. (Repealed by Statute Law Revision Act 1874 (No. 2) (37 & 38 Vict. c. 96))
Queen Anne's Bounty Act 1838 (repealed)	1 & 2 Vict. c. 20	11 April 1838
An Act for the Consolidation of the Offices of First Fruits, Tenths, and Queen Anne's Bounty. (Repealed by Statute Law (Repeals) Act 2004 (c. 14))
Supply (No. 2) Act 1838 (repealed)	1 & 2 Vict. c. 21	9 May 1838
An Act to apply the Sum of Eight Millions out of the Consolidated Fund to the Service of the Year One thousand eight hundred and thirty-eight. (Repealed by Statute Law Revision Act 1874 (No. 2) (37 & 38 Vict. c. 96))
Haileybury College Act 1838 (repealed)	1 & 2 Vict. c. 22	9 May 1838
An Act to enable the Commissioners for the Affairs of India to make Rules and Regulations for Haileybury College. (Repealed by Statute Law Revision Act 1861 (24 & 25 Vict. c. 101))
Parsonages Act 1838 (repealed)	1 & 2 Vict. c. 23	9 May 1838
An Act to amend the Law for providing fit Houses for the beneficed Clergy. (Repealed by Church Property Measure 2018 (No. 8))
Regency Act Amendment Act 1838 (repealed)	1 & 2 Vict. c. 24	11 June 1838
An Act to repeal Part of an Act intituled "An Act to provide for the Administration of the Government in case the Crown should descend to Her Royal Highness the Princess Alexandrina Victoria, Daughter of His late Royal Highness the Duke of Kent, being under the Age of Eighteen Years; and for the Care and Guardianship of Her Person." (Note: Regency Act 1830 (1 Will. 4. c. 2)) (Repealed by Statute Law Revision Act 1874 (No. 2) (37 & 38 Vict. c. 96))
Poor Relief (Loans) Act 1838 (repealed)	1 & 2 Vict. c. 25	11 June 1838
An Act to explain and amend an Act of the Seventh Year of His late Majesty, (Note: Poor Relief (Loans) Act 1836 (6 & 7 Will. 4. c. 107)) for extending the Period for the Repayment of Loans made under an Act passed in the Fourth and Fifth Year of His said late Majesty (Note: Poor Law Amendment Act 1834 (4 & 5 Will. 4. c. 76)) for the Amendment and better Administration of the Laws relating to the Poor in England and Wales. (Repealed by Poor Law Act 1927 (17 & 18 Geo. 5. c. 14))
Exchequer Bills (No. 2) Act 1838 (repealed)	1 & 2 Vict. c. 26	11 June 1838
An Act for raising the Sum of Thirteen Millions by Exchequer Bills, for the Service of the Year One thousand eight hundred and thirty-eight. (Repealed by Statute Law Revision Act 1874 (No. 2) (37 & 38 Vict. c. 96))
Criminal Lunatics (Ireland) Act 1838 (repealed)	1 & 2 Vict. c. 27	11 June 1838
An Act to make more effectual Provision for the Prevention of Offences by Insane Persons in Ireland. (Repealed by Statute Law Revision Act 1874 (No. 2) (37 & 38 Vict. c. 96), Statute Law Revision (No. 2) Act 1890 (53 & 54 Vict. c. 51) and Statute Law Revision Act 1891 (54 & 55 Vict. c. 67), Prison Act (Northern Ireland) 1953 (c. 18 (N.I.)) and Mental Health Act (Northern Ireland) 1961 (c. 15 (N.I.)))
Bread (Ireland) Act 1838	1 & 2 Vict. c. 28	4 July 1838
An Act to repeal the several Acts now in force relating to Bread to be sold in Ireland, and to provide other Regulations for the making and Sale of Bread, and for preventing the Adulteration of Meal, Flour, and Bread, in that Part of the United Kingdom called Ireland.
Parsonages (Amendment) Act 1838 (repealed)	1 & 2 Vict. c. 29	4 July 1838
An Act to supply an Omission in an Act passed in the present Session of Parliament, intituled "An Act to amend the Law for providing fit Houses for the beneficed Clergy." (Note: Parsonages Act 1838 (1 & 2 Vict. c. 23)) (Repealed by Parsonages Measure 1930 (No. 1))
Sodor and Man Act 1838 (repealed)	1 & 2 Vict. c. 30	4 July 1838
An Act for continuing the Bishoprick of Sodor and Man. (Repealed by Statute Law (Repeals) Measure 2018 (No. 1))
Sale of Church Patronages Belonging to Municipal Corporations Act 1838 (repealed)	1 & 2 Vict. c. 31	4 July 1838
An Act for facilitating the Sale of Church Patronage belonging to Municipal Corporations in certain Cases. (Repealed by Municipal Corporations Act 1882 (45 & 46 Vict. c. 50))
Courts of Common Law, Sittings Act 1838 (repealed)	1 & 2 Vict. c. 32	4 July 1838
An Act to enable Her Majesty's Courts at Westminster to hold Sittings in Banc in Time of Vacation. (Repealed by Statute Law Revision Act 1874 (No. 2) (37 & 38 Vict. c. 96))
Sugar Duties Act 1838 (repealed)	1 & 2 Vict. c. 33	4 July 1838
An Act for granting to Her Majesty, until the Fifth Day of July One thousand eight hundred and thirty-nine, certain Duties on Sugar imported into the United Kingdom, for the Service of the Year One thousand eight hundred and thirty-eight. (Repealed by Statute Law Revision Act 1874 (No. 2) (37 & 38 Vict. c. 96))
Party Processions (Ireland) Act 1838 (repealed)	1 & 2 Vict. c. 34	4 July 1838
An Act to continue for Five Years, and from thence until the End of the then next Session of Parliament, an Act of the Second and Third Years of the Reign of His late Majesty, (Note: Party Processions (Ireland) Act 1832 (2 & 3 Will. 4. c. 118)) to restrain for Five Years, in certain Cases, Party Processions in Ireland. (Repealed by Statute Law Revision Act 1874 (No. 2) (37 & 38 Vict. c. 96))
Parliamentary Boroughs (England), Stamp Duty Act 1838 (repealed)	1 & 2 Vict. c. 35	4 July 1838
An Act to repeal the Stamp Duty now paid on Admission to the Freedom of Corporations in England. (Repealed by Municipal Corporations Act 1882 (45 & 46 Vict. c. 50))
Kingstown and Dublin Harbours Act 1838 (repealed)	1 & 2 Vict. c. 36	27 July 1838
An Act to make further Provisions and to amend the Acts relating to the Harbour of Kingstown and the Port and Harbour of Dublin. (Repealed by Dublin Port and Docks Act 1869 (32 & 33 Vict. c. c))
Grand Jury (Ireland) Act 1838 (repealed)	1 & 2 Vict. c. 37	27 July 1838
An Act to empower the Foreman or any other Member of Grand Juries in Ireland to administer Oaths to Witnesses on Bills of Indictment. (Repealed by Statute Law Revision Act 1874 (No. 2) (37 & 38 Vict. c. 96), Statute Law Revision (No. 2) Act 1890 (53 & 54 Vict. c. 51), Statute Law Revision Act (Northern Ireland) 1954 (c. 35 (N.I.)), Perjury Act (Northern Ireland) 1946 (c. 13 (N.I.)) and Grand Jury (Abolition) Act (Northern Ireland) 1969 (c. 15 (N.I.)))
Vagrancy Act 1838 (repealed)	1 & 2 Vict. c. 38	27 July 1838
An Act to amend an Act (Note: Vagrancy Act 1824 (5 Geo. 4. c. 83)) for punishing idle and disorderly Persons and Rogues and Vagabonds. (Repealed by Indecent Displays (Control) Act 1981 (c. 42))
Slave Trade Treaties Act 1838 (repealed)	1 & 2 Vict. c. 39	27 July 1838
An Act for carrying into effect a Convention of Accession of the Hans Towns (Note: The cities that acceded to the treaty were Lübeck, Bremen and Hamburg.) to Two Conventions with the King of the French, for suppressing the Slave Trade. (Repealed by Slave Trade Act 1873 (36 & 37 Vict. c. 88))
Slave Trade Treaty (Sweden) Act 1838 (repealed)	1 & 2 Vict. c. 40	27 July 1838
An Act to carry into effect an additional Article to a Treaty with Sweden relative to the Slave Trade. (Repealed by Slave Trade Act 1873 (36 & 37 Vict. c. 88))
Slave Trade Treaty (Netherlands) Act 1838 (repealed)	1 & 2 Vict. c. 41	27 July 1838
An Act for carrying into effect an additional Article to a Treaty with the Netherlands relating to the Slave Trade. (Repealed by Slave Trade Act 1873 (36 & 37 Vict. c. 88))
Dean Forest (Encroachments) Act 1838 (repealed)	1 & 2 Vict. c. 42	27 July 1838
An Act to empower the Commissioners of Her Majesty's Woods, Forests and Land Revenues to confirm the Titles to, and to grant Leases of, Encroachments in the Forest of Dean in the County of Gloucester. (Repealed by Crown Estate Act 1961 (9 & 10 Eliz. 2. c. 55) and Wild Creatures and Forest Laws Act 1971 (c. 47))
Dean Forest (Mines) Act 1838	1 & 2 Vict. c. 43	27 July 1838
An Act for regulating the opening and working of Mines and Quarries in the Forest of Dean and Hundred of Saint Briavels in the County of Gloucester.
Glass Duties Act 1838 (repealed)	1 & 2 Vict. c. 44	27 July 1838
An Act to consolidate and amend the Laws for collecting and securing the Duties of Excise on Glass. (Repealed by Statute Law Revision Act 1874 (No. 2) (37 & 38 Vict. c. 96))
Common Law Procedure Act 1838 (repealed)	1 & 2 Vict. c. 45	27 July 1838
An Act to extend the Jurisdiction of the Judges of the Superior Courts of Common Law; to amend Chapter Fifty-six of the First Year of Her present Majesty's Reign, (Note: Solicitors Act 1837 (7 Will. 4 & 1 Vict. c. 56)) for regulating the Admission of Attornies; and to provide for the taking of Special Bail in the Absence of the Judges. (Repealed by Statute Law Revision (No. 2) Act 1888 (51 & 52 Vict. c. 57))
Western Australia Government Act 1838 (repealed)	1 & 2 Vict. c. 46	27 July 1838
An Act to continue until the Thirty-first Day of December One thousand eight hundred and forty-one, and from thence to the End of the then next Session of Parliament, an Act of the Tenth Year of His late Majesty King George the Fourth, (Note: Government of Western Australia Act 1829 (10 Geo. 4. c. 22)) for providing for the Government of His Majesty's Settlements in Western Australia on the Western Coast of New Holland. (Repealed by Statute Law Revision Act 1874 (No. 2) (37 & 38 Vict. c. 96))
Slave Trade Suppression Act 1838 (repealed)	1 & 2 Vict. c. 47	27 July 1838
An Act for the better and more effectually carrying into effect the Treaties and Conventions made with Foreign Powers for suppressing the Slave Trade. (Repealed by Slave Trade Act 1873 (36 & 37 Vict. c. 88))
House of Commons Qualification Act 1838 (repealed)	1 & 2 Vict. c. 48	27 July 1838
An Act to amend the Laws relating to the Qualification of Members to serve in Parliament. (Repealed by Property Qualification for Members of Parliament Act 1858 (21 & 22 Vict. c. 26))
Government Annuities Act 1838 (repealed)	1 & 2 Vict. c. 49	27 July 1838
An Act to transfer the Management of certain Annuities on Lives from the Trustees of the Waterloo Subscription Fund to the Commissioners for the Reduction of the National Debt, and to amend several Acts for enabling the said Commissioners to grant Life Annuities and Annuities for Terms of Years. (Repealed by Statute Law Revision Act 1888 (51 & 52 Vict. c. 3) and Government Annuities Act 1929 (19 & 20 Geo. 5. c. 29))
Administration of Justice, New South Wales, etc. Act 1838 (repealed)	1 & 2 Vict. c. 50	27 July 1838
An Act to continue until the Thirty-first Day of December One thousand eight hundred and thirty-nine, and from thence to the End of the then next Session of Parliament, an Act of the Ninth Year of His Majesty King George the Fourth, (Note: Australian Courts Act 1828 (9 Geo. 4. c. 83)) for the Administration of Justice in New South Wales and Van Diemens Land. (Repealed by Statute Law Revision Act 1874 (No. 2) (37 & 38 Vict. c. 96))
Grand Jury Cess Dublin Act 1838 (repealed)	1 & 2 Vict. c. 51	27 July 1838
An Act to amend the Laws relating to the Levy of Grand Jury Cess in the County of the City of Dublin. (Repealed by Statute Law (Repeals) Act 1993 (c. 50))
Linen Manufacturers, etc. (Ireland) Act 1838 (repealed)	1 & 2 Vict. c. 52	27 July 1838
An Act to continue for Five Years, and from thence until the End of the then next Session of Parliament, an Act of the Fifth and Sixth Years of His late Majesty, (Note: Linen Manufactures (Ireland) Act 1835 (5 & 6 Will. 4. c. 27)) for the Regulation of the Linen and Hempen Manufactures in Ireland. (Repealed by Statute Law Revision Act 1874 (No. 2) (37 & 38 Vict. c. 96))
County Treasurers (Ireland) Act 1838 (repealed)	1 & 2 Vict. c. 53	27 July 1838
An Act to amend an Act of the last Session of Parliament (Note: County Treasurers (Ireland) Act 1837 (7 Will. 4 & 1 Vict. c. 54)) for providing more effectual Means to make Treasurers of Counties and Counties of Cities in Ireland account for Public Monies, and to secure the same. (Repealed by Statute Law Revision Act 1874 (No. 2) (37 & 38 Vict. c. 96), Statute Law Revision (No. 2) Act 1890 (53 & 54 Vict. c. 51) and Local Government (Ireland) Act 1898 (61 & 62 Vict. c. 37))
Chancery Court Act 1838 (repealed)	1 & 2 Vict. c. 54	27 July 1838
An Act for making further Investments from the Money of the Suitors of the Court of Chancery and the Court of Exchequer, and for providing for the Payment into Court of Fees received by certain Officers of the Lord Chancellor. (Repealed by Courts of Justice (Salaries and Funds) Act 1869 (32 & 33 Vict. c. 91))
Debt of City of Edinburgh, etc. Act, 1838	1 & 2 Vict. c. 55	27 July 1838
An Act to regulate and secure the Debt due by the City of Edinburgh to the Public; to confirm an Agreement between the said City and its Creditors; and to effect a Settlement of the Affairs of the said City and the Town of Leith.
Poor Relief (Ireland) Act 1838 or the Irish Poor Law Act 1838	1 & 2 Vict. c. 56	31 July 1838
An Act for the more effectual Relief of the destitute Poor in Ireland.
Land Tax Commissioners (Appointment) Act 1838 (repealed)	1 & 2 Vict. c. 57	31 July 1838
An Act to appoint additional Commissioners for executing the Acts granting a Land Tax and Duties on Personal Estates, Offices, and Pensions. (Repealed by Statute Law Revision Act 1950 (14 Geo. 6. c. 6))
Land Tax Redemption Act 1838 (repealed)	1 & 2 Vict. c. 58	31 July 1838
An Act to vest in the Commissioners of the Treasury the Powers heretofore exercised by Commissioners appointed for certain Purposes relating to the Redemption of the Land Tax; and to authorize the Court of Exchequer to determine Disputes as to the Division in which Lands are liable to be rated to the Land Tax. (Repealed by Finance Act 1963 (c. 25))
International Copyright Act 1838 (repealed)	1 & 2 Vict. c. 59	31 July 1838
An Act for securing to Authors, in certain Cases, the Benefit of International Copyright. (Repealed by International Copyright Act 1844 (7 & 8 Vict. c. 12))
South Australia Government Act 1838 (repealed)	1 & 2 Vict. c. 60	31 July 1838
An Act to amend an Act of the Fourth and Fifth Years of His late Majesty (Note: South Australia Act 1834 (4 & 5 Will. 4. c. 95)) empowering His Majesty to erect South Australia into a British Province or Provinces. (Repealed by South Australia Act 1842 (5 & 6 Vict. c. 61))
Government Offices Security Act 1838 (repealed)	1 & 2 Vict. c. 61	31 July 1838
An Act to amend an Act for enabling Persons to make Deposits of Stock or Exchequer Bills in lieu of giving Security by Bond to the Postmaster General and Commissioners of Land Revenue, Customs, Excise, Stamps, and Taxes. (Repealed by Statute Law (Repeals) Act 1974 (c. 22))
Renewal of Leases (Ireland) Act 1838	1 & 2 Vict. c. 62	31 July 1838
An Act to enable Masters of the Court of Chancery in Ireland, upon Application to that Court by Petition, to execute Renewals of Leases for Lives containing Covenants for Renewal in the Names of Persons bound by such Covenants to execute the same, and being out of the Jurisdiction of the Court; and to extend such Powers to Cases of Terms for Years, whether absolutely or dependent upon Lives.
Dublin Police District Act 1838 (repealed)	1 & 2 Vict. c. 63	4 August 1838
An Act to amend the Acts relating to the Police of the District of the Dublin Metropolis. (Repealed by Statute Law Revision Act 1874 (No. 2) (37 & 38 Vict. c. 96))
Tithe Act 1838 (repealed)	1 & 2 Vict. c. 64	4 August 1838
An Act to facilitate the Merger of Tithes in Land. (Repealed by Statute Law (Repeals) Act 1998 (c. 43))
Local Commissioners Relief Act 1838 (repealed)	1 & 2 Vict. c. 65	4 August 1838
An Act for relieving the Commissioners and others acting in the Execution of divers Local Improvement Acts from certain Penalties and Disabilities. (Repealed by Statute Law Revision Act 1874 (No. 2) (37 & 38 Vict. c. 96))
Gibraltar Lighthouse, etc. Act 1838 (repealed)	1 & 2 Vict. c. 66	4 August 1838
An Act for maintaining a Lighthouse at Gibraltar, and respecting Lighthouses not within the United Kingdom. (Repealed by Merchant Shipping Repeal Act 1854 (17 & 18 Vict. c. 120))
West Indian Prisons Act 1838 (repealed)	1 & 2 Vict. c. 67	4 August 1838
An Act for the better Government of Prisons in the West Indies. (Repealed by Statute Law (Repeals) Act 1973 (c. 39))
Turnpike Acts Continuance Act 1838 (repealed)	1 & 2 Vict. c. 68	4 August 1838
An Act to continue until the First Day of June One thousand eight hundred and forty, and to the End of the then Session of Parliament, the Local Turnpike Acts for Great Britain which expire with this or the ensuing Session of Parliament. (Repealed by Statute Law Revision Act 1874 (No. 2) (37 & 38 Vict. c. 96))
Estates Vest in Heirs, etc., of Mortgages Act 1838 (repealed)	1 & 2 Vict. c. 69	4 August 1838
An Act to remove Doubts respecting Conveyances of Estates vested in Heirs and Devisees of Mortgagees. (Repealed by Trustee Act 1850 (13 & 14 Vict. c. 60))
Entail Act 1838 (repealed)	1 & 2 Vict. c. 70	4 August 1838
An Act to extend the Powers of an Act of the Sixth and Seventh Year of the Reign of His late Majesty, (Note: Entail Powers Act 1836 (6 & 7 Will. 4. c. 42)) in relation to granting Tacks and making Excambions by Heirs of Entail. (Repealed by Abolition of Feudal Tenure etc. (Scotland) Act 2000 (asp 5))
Arms and Gunpowder (Ireland) Act 1838 (repealed)	1 & 2 Vict. c. 71	4 August 1838
An Act to amend and continue for One Year, and from thence to the End of the then next Session of Parliament, the several Acts relating to the Importation and keeping of Arms and Gunpowder in Ireland. (Repealed by Statute Law Revision Act 1874 (No. 2) (37 & 38 Vict. c. 96))
Turnpike Acts (Ireland) Act 1838 (repealed)	1 & 2 Vict. c. 72	4 August 1838
An Act to continue for One Year, and from thence until the End of the then next Session of Parliament, the several Acts for regulating the Turnpike Roads in Ireland. (Repealed by Statute Law Revision Act 1874 (No. 2) (37 & 38 Vict. c. 96))
Lunatics Act 1838 (repealed)	1 & 2 Vict. c. 73	10 August 1838
An Act to continue for Three Years, and from thence to the End of the then next Session of Parliament, Two Acts relating to the Care and Treatment of Insane Persons in England. (Repealed by Lunacy Act 1845 (8 & 9 Vict. c. 100))
Small Tenements Recovery Act 1838 (repealed)	1 & 2 Vict. c. 74	10 August 1838
An Act to facilitate the Recovery of Possession of Tenements after due Determination of the Tenancy. (Repealed by Rent Act 1965 (c. 75) and Small Tenements Recovery Act 1838 (Repeal) (Appointed Day) Order 1972 (SI 1972/1161))
Fires Prevention Act 1838 (repealed)	1 & 2 Vict. c. 75	10 August 1838
An Act to amend so much of the Fires Prevention (Metropolis) Act, 1785, (Note: Fires Prevention Act 1785 (25 Geo. 3. c. 77)) as relates to Manufactories of Pitch, Tar and Turpentine. (Repealed by Statute Law Revision Act 1874 (No. 2) (37 & 38 Vict. c. 96), Statute Law Revision (No. 2) Act 1888 (51 & 52 Vict. c. 57), Statute Law Revision (No. 2) Act 1890 (53 & 54 Vict. c. 51), Statute Law Revision Act 1948 (11 & 12 Geo. 6. c. 62) and Criminal Law Act 1967 (c. 58))
Inland Fisheries (Ireland) Act 1838 (repealed)	1 & 2 Vict. c. 76	10 August 1838
An Act to explain and amend certain Provisions in Acts of the Parliament of Ireland for the Protection of Fisheries in that Kingdom. (Repealed by Fisheries (Ireland) Act 1842 (5 & 6 Vict. c. 106))
Quakers and Moravians Act 1838 (repealed)	1 & 2 Vict. c. 77	10 August 1838
An Act for permitting Affirmation to be made instead of an Oath in certain Cases. (Repealed by Statute Law (Repeals) Act 1977 (c. 18))
Loan Societies (Ireland) Act 1838 (repealed)	1 & 2 Vict. c. 78	10 August 1838
An Act for the Amendment of the Laws relating to Loan Societies in Ireland. (Repealed by Loan Societies Act 1843 (6 & 7 Vict. c. 41))
Hackney Carriages, Metropolis Act 1838 (repealed)	1 & 2 Vict. c. 79	10 August 1838
An Act for the better Regulation of Hackney Carriages, and of Metropolitan Stage Carriages, and of Waggons, Carts, and Drays, used in and near the Metropolis, and of the Drivers and Attendants thereof. (Repealed by London Hackney Carriages Act 1843 (6 & 7 Vict. c. 86))
Special Constables Act 1838 (repealed)	1 & 2 Vict. c. 80	10 August 1838
An Act for the Payment of Constables for Keeping the Peace near Public Works. (Repealed by Statute Law Revision Act 1874 (No. 2) (37 & 38 Vict. c. 96))
Bank of Ireland Advances Act 1838 (repealed)	1 & 2 Vict. c. 81	10 August 1838
An Act further to postpone until the First Day of January One thousand eight hundred and forty the Repayment of certain Sums advanced by the Bank of Ireland for the Public Service. (Repealed by Statute Law Revision Act 1870 (33 & 34 Vict. c. 69))
Parkhurst Prison Act 1838 (repealed)	1 & 2 Vict. c. 82	10 August 1838
An Act for establishing a Prison for young Offenders. (Repealed by Criminal Justice Act 1948 (11 & 12 Geo. 6. c. 58))
Slave Trade Treaties (No. 2) Act 1838 (repealed)	1 & 2 Vict. c. 83	10 August 1838
An Act for carrying into effect a Convention of Accession of the Duke of Tuscany to Two Conventions with the King of the French for suppressing the Slave Trade. (Repealed by Slave Trade Act 1873 (36 & 37 Vict. c. 88))
Slave Trade Treaties (No. 3) Act 1838 (repealed)	1 & 2 Vict. c. 84	10 August 1838
An Act for carrying into effect a Convention of Accession of the King of the Two Sicilies (Note: Kingdom of the Two Sicilies.) to Two Conventions with the King of the French for suppressing the Slave Trade. (Repealed by Slave Trade Act 1873 (36 & 37 Vict. c. 88))
Stamps Act 1838 (repealed)	1 & 2 Vict. c. 85	10 August 1838
An Act to authorize the using in any Part of the United Kingdom Stamps denoting Duties payable in Great Britain and Ireland respectively. (Repealed by Inland Revenue Repeal Act 1870 (33 & 34 Vict. c. 99))
Court of Session (No. 1) Act 1838 or the Court of Session Act 1838 (repealed)	1 & 2 Vict. c. 86	10 August 1838
An Act to diminish Delay and Expence in Advocations and Suspensions in the Court of Session in Scotland. (Repealed by Court of Session Act 1988 (c. 36))
Highland Schools Act 1838 (repealed)	1 & 2 Vict. c. 87	10 August 1838
An Act to facilitate the Foundation and Endowment of additional Schools in Scotland. (Repealed by Highland Schools Act 1873 (36 & 37 Vict. c. 53))
Advances for Public Works Act 1838 (repealed)	1 & 2 Vict. c. 88	14 August 1838
An Act to authorize a further Issue of Exchequer Bills for Public Works and Fisheries and Employment of the Poor, and to amend the Acts relating thereto. (Repealed by Public Works Loans Act 1875 (38 & 39 Vict. c. 89))
Drouly Fund Act 1838 (repealed)	1 & 2 Vict. c. 89	14 August 1838
An Act respecting the Transfer of certain Funds to the Secretary at War and the Paymaster General. (Repealed by Statute Law (Repeals) Act 2008 (c. 12))
Militia Ballots Suspension Act 1838 (repealed)	1 & 2 Vict. c. 90	14 August 1838
An Act to suspend until the End of the next Session of Parliament the making of Lists and the Ballots and Enrolments for the Militia of the United Kingdom. (Repealed by Statute Law Revision Act 1874 (No. 2) (37 & 38 Vict. c. 96))
Militia Pay Act 1838 (repealed)	1 & 2 Vict. c. 91	14 August 1838
An Act to defray the Charge of the Pay, Clothing, and contingent and other Expences of the Disembodied Militia in Great Britain and Ireland; and to grant Allowances in certain Cases to Subaltern Officers, Adjutants, Paymasters, Quartermasters, Surgeons, Assistant Surgeons, Surgeons Mates, and Serjeant Majors of the Militia, until the First Pay of July One thousand eight hundred and thirty-nine. (Repealed by Statute Law Revision Act 1874 (No. 2) (37 & 38 Vict. c. 96))
Four and a Half per Cent Duties Repeal Act 1838 (repealed)	1 & 2 Vict. c. 92	14 August 1838
An Act to repeal the Four-and-a-Half per Centum Duties. (Repealed by Statute Law Revision Act 1874 (No. 2) (37 & 38 Vict. c. 96))
Exchequer Bills (No. 2) Act 1838 (repealed)	1 & 2 Vict. c. 93	14 August 1838
An Act for raising the Sum of Eleven millions forty-four thousand five hundred and fifty Pounds by Exchequer Bills, for the Service of the Year One thousand eight hundred and thirty-eight. (Repealed by Statute Law Revision Act 1874 (No. 2) (37 & 38 Vict. c. 96))
Public Record Office Act 1838 (repealed)	1 & 2 Vict. c. 94	14 August 1838
An Act for keeping safely the Public Records. (Repealed by Public Records Act 1958 (6 & 7 Eliz. 2. c. 51))
Pensions Act 1838 (repealed)	1 & 2 Vict. c. 95	14 August 1838
An Act to provide for the Payment of certain Pensions. (Repealed by Statute Law Revision Act 1874 (37 & 38 Vict. c. 35), Statute Law Revision (No. 2) Act 1890 (53 & 54 Vict. c. 51) and Statute Law Revision Act 1950 (14 Geo. 6. c. 6))
Joint Stock Banks Act 1838 (repealed)	1 & 2 Vict. c. 96	14 August 1838
An Act to amend, until the End of the next Session of Parliament, the Law relative to Legal Proceedings by certain Joint Stock Banking Companies against their own Members, and by such Members against the Companies. (Repealed by Statute Law Revision Act 1963 (c. 30))
Postage Act 1838 (repealed)	1 & 2 Vict. c. 97	14 August 1838
An Act for imposing Rates of Postage on the Conveyance of Letters by Packet Boats between Places in the Mediterranean and other Parts. (Repealed by Post Office (Duties) Act 1840 (3 & 4 Vict. c. 96))
Railways (Conveyance of Mails) Act 1838 (repealed)	1 & 2 Vict. c. 98	14 August 1838
An Act to provide for the Conveyance of the Mails by Railways. (Repealed by Post Office Act 1953 (1 & 2 Eliz. 2. c. 36))
Fines, etc. (Ireland) Act 1838 (repealed)	1 & 2 Vict. c. 99	14 August 1838
An Act for the more effectual levying of Fines, Penalties, Issues, Deodands, and Amerciaments, and of forfeited Recognizances estreated, in Ireland; and for the Application and Distribution thereof. (Repealed by Fines, etc. (Ireland) Act 1843 (6 & 7 Vict. c. 56))
Forms of Pleading Act 1838 (repealed)	1 & 2 Vict. c. 100	14 August 1838
An Act for continuing, under certain Limitations, the Powers given to the Judges for altering the Forms of Pleading in the Courts of Common Law at Westminster and elsewhere. (Repealed by Statute Law Revision Act 1874 (No. 2) (37 & 38 Vict. c. 96))
Duchies of Lancaster and Cornwall (Accounts) Act 1838	1 & 2 Vict. c. 101	14 August 1838
An Act to revive and continue an Act of the First and Second Years of His late Majesty, to enable His Majesty to make Leases, Copies, and Grants of Offices, Lands, and Hereditaments Parcel of the Dutchy of Cornwall or annexed to the same; and to make Provision for rendering to Parliament annual Accounts of the Receipts and Disbursement of the Duchies of Cornwall and Lancaster.
Slave Trade Suppression (No. 2) Act 1838 (repealed)	1 & 2 Vict. c. 102	14 August 1838
An Act to revive and continue, until Six Months after the Commencement of the next Session of Parliament, and to amend, an Act (Note: Slave Trade Act 1837 (7 Will. 4 & 1 Vict. c. 62)) for authorizing Her Majesty to carry into immediate Execution by Orders in Council any Treaties made for the Suppression of the Slave Trade. (Repealed by Slave Trade Act 1873 (36 & 37 Vict. c. 88))
Municipal Corporations (Ireland) Act 1838 (repealed)	1 & 2 Vict. c. 103	14 August 1838
An Act to restrain the Alienation of Corporate Property in certain Towns in Ireland. (Repealed by Statute Law Revision Act 1874 (No. 2) (37 & 38 Vict. c. 96))
County of Clare Treasurer Act 1838 (repealed)	1 & 2 Vict. c. 104	14 August 1838
An Act to authorize the County of Clare to borrow a Sum of Money for the Relief of the Creditors and others remaining unpaid by reason of the Default of the late Treasurer of the said County, to provide for the Repayment of the same, and to direct Proceedings to be taken in reference to the Default of such late Treasurer. (Repealed by Statute Law Revision Act 1874 (No. 2) (37 & 38 Vict. c. 96))
Oaths Act 1838 (repealed)	1 & 2 Vict. c. 105	14 August 1838
An Act to remove Doubts as to the Validity of certain Oaths. (Repealed by Oaths Act 1978 (c. 19))
Pluralities Act 1838	1 & 2 Vict. c. 106	14 August 1838
An Act to abridge the holding of Benefices in Plurality, and to make better provision for the Residence of the Clergy.
Church Building Act 1838 (repealed)	1 & 2 Vict. c. 107	15 August 1838
An Act to amend and render more effectual the Church Building Acts. (Repealed for the Isle of Man by Isle of Man (Church Building and New Parishes) Act 1897 (60 & 61 Vict. c. 33) and for England and Wales by Statute Law (Repeals) Act 1974 (c. 22) and Endowments and Glebe Measure 1976 (No. 4))
Ecclesiastical Appointments Suspension Act 1838 (repealed)	1 & 2 Vict. c. 108	15 August 1838
An Act for suspending until the First Day of August One thousand eight hundred and thirty-nine, and to the End of the then Session of Parliament, the Appointment to certain Dignities and Offices in Cathedral and Collegiate Churches, and to Sinecure Rectories. (Repealed by Statute Law Revision Act 1874 (No. 2) (37 & 38 Vict. c. 96))
Tithe Rentcharge (Ireland) Act 1838 or the Tithe Commutation Act 1838	1 & 2 Vict. c. 109	15 August 1838
An Act to abolish Compositions for Tithes in Ireland, and to substitute Rent-charges in lieu thereof.
Judgments Act 1838	1 & 2 Vict. c. 110	16 August 1838
An Act for abolishing Arrest on Mesne Process in Civil Actions, except in certain Cases; for extending the Remedies of Creditors against the Property of Debtors; and for amending the Laws for the Relief of Insolvent Debtors in England.
Appropriation Act 1838 (repealed)	1 & 2 Vict. c. 111	16 August 1838
An Act to apply a Sum out of the Consolidated Fund, and the Surplus of Ways and Means, to the Service of the Year One thousand eight hundred and thirty-eight, and to appropriate the Supplies granted in this Session of Parliament. (Repealed by Statute Law Revision Act 1874 (No. 2) (37 & 38 Vict. c. 96))
Indemnity to Certain Persons Act 1838 (repealed)	1 & 2 Vict. c. 112	16 August 1838
An Act for indemnifying those who have issued or acted under certain Parts of a certain Ordinance made under colour of an Act passed in the present Session of Parliament, intituled "An Act to make temporary Provision for the Government of Lower Canada." (Note: Lower Canada Government Act 1838 (1 & 2 Vict. c. 9)) (Repealed by Statute Law Revision Act 1874 (No. 2) (37 & 38 Vict. c. 96))
Customs Act 1838 (repealed)	1 & 2 Vict. c. 113	16 August 1838
An Act to amend the Laws relating to the Customs. (Repealed by Passengers Act 1842 (5 & 6 Vict. c. 107) and Customs (Repeal) Act 1845 (8 & 9 Vict. c. 84))
Debtors (Scotland) Act 1838 or the Personal Diligence Act 1838	1 & 2 Vict. c. 114	16 August 1838
An Act to amend the Law of Scotland in Matters relating to Personal Diligence, Arrestments, and Poindings.
County Dublin Baronies Act 1838 (repealed)	1 & 2 Vict. c. 115	16 August 1838
An Act to amend an Act of the Sixth and Seventh Years of His late Majesty, (Note: Valuation of Lands (Ireland) Act 1836 (6 & 7 Will. 4. c. 84)) for the uniform Valuation of Lands and Tenements in Ireland, and for incorporating detached Portions of Counties and Baronies with those Counties and Baronies respectively whereto the same may adjoin or wherein the same are locally situate. (Repealed by Statute Law Revision Act 1874 (No. 2) (37 & 38 Vict. c. 96) and Local Government (Ireland) Act 1898 (61 & 62 Vict. c. 37))
County Institutions (Ireland) Act 1838 or the County Institution (Ireland) Act 1838 (repealed)	1 & 2 Vict. c. 116	16 August 1838
An Act to facilitate Advances out of County Monies for the Support of County Gaols and Institutions in Ireland. (Repealed by Statute Law Revision Act 1892 (55 & 56 Vict. c. 19) and Local Government (Ireland) Act 1898 (61 & 62 Vict. c. 37))
Private Bill Deposits Act 1838 (repealed)	1 & 2 Vict. c. 117	16 August 1838
An Act to provide for the Custody of certain Monies paid in pursuance of the Standing Orders of either House of Parliament by Subscribers to Works or Undertakings to be effected under the Authority of Parliament. (Repealed by Parliamentary Deposits Act 1846 (9 & 10 Vict. c. 20))
Court of Session (No. 2) Act 1838 (repealed)	1 & 2 Vict. c. 118	16 August 1838
An Act to make certain Alterations in the Duties of the Lords Ordinary, and in the Establishment of Clerks and Officers of the Court of Session and Court of Commissioners for Teinds in Scotland, and to reduce the Fees payable in those Courts. (Repealed by Abolition of Feudal Tenure etc. (Scotland) Act 2000 (asp 5))
Sheriff Courts (Scotland) Act 1838 (repealed)	1 & 2 Vict. c. 119	16 August 1838
An Act to regulate the Constitution, Jurisdiction, and Forms of Process of Sheriff Courts in Scotland. (Repealed by Statute Law (Repeals) Act 1986 (c. 12))
Tin Duties Act 1838 or the Coinage Abolition Act 1838 (repealed)	1 & 2 Vict. c. 120	16 August 1838
An Act for the Abolition of the Duties payable on the Coinage of Tin in the Counties of Cornwall and Devon, and for giving Compensation in lieu of such Duties, and to reduce the Duties of Customs payable on Tin. (Repealed by Miscellaneous Financial Provisions Act 1983 (c. 29))

=== Local acts ===
Short title	Citation	Royal assent
Long title
Paignton Harbour Act 1838 (repealed)	1 & 2 Vict. c. i	30 March 1838
An Act for making and maintaining a Harbour and other Works at Paignton in the County of Devon. (Repealed by Tor Bay Harbour Act 1970 (c. liii))
Milton-next-Sittingbourne Improvement Act 1838 (repealed)	1 & 2 Vict. c. ii	30 March 1838
An Act for better paving cleansing, lighting, watching, and otherwise improving the Town of Milton-next-Sittingbourne in the County of Kent. (Repealed by County of Kent Act 1981 (c. xviii))
Roads from Warminster and from Frome Act 1838 (repealed)	1 & 2 Vict. c. iii	30 March 1838
An Act to alter and enlarge some of the Provisions of an Act passed in the Third Year of the Reign of His late Majesty King William the Fourth, (Note: Roads from Warminster and from Frome and from Woolverton Act 1833 (3 & 4 Will. 4. c. lxxviii)) for better rearing the Roads from Warminster and from Frome to the Bath Road, and other Roads therein mentioned. (Repealed by Black Dog Road Act 1853 (16 & 17 Vict. c. lxxi))
London and Greenwich Railway Act 1838	1 & 2 Vict. c. iv	11 April 1838
An Act for extending the Time for completing the London and Greenwich Railway.
Exmouth Market Act 1838 (repealed)	1 & 2 Vict. c. v	11 April 1838
An Act for regulating the Market in the Town of Exmouth in the County of Devon. (Repealed by Exmouth Market Act 1867 (30 & 31 Vict. c. xix))
Haleworthy, Wadebridge and Mitchell Road (Cornwall) Act 1838	1 & 2 Vict. c. vi	11 April 1838
An Act for repairing and improving the Road leading from Haleworthy in the Parish of Davidstow in the County of Cornwall to the East End of Wadebridge, and from the West End of Wadebridge into and through the Borough of Mitchell in the said County; and for making and maintaining certain new Roads to communicate therewith.
Kincardine Roads Act 1838	1 & 2 Vict. c. vii	11 April 1838
An Act for more effectually repairing and keeping in repair certain Roads in the County of Kincardine.
River Ribble Navigation Act 1838 (repealed)	1 & 2 Vict. c. viii	9 May 1838
An Act to repeal an Act passed in the Forty-sixth Year of the Reign of His Majesty King George the Third, (Note: River Ribble Navigation Act 1806 (46 Geo. 3. c. cxxi)) for improving the Navigation of the River Ribble in the County Palatine of Lancaster, and for the further Improvement of the Navigation of the said River. (Repealed by Ribble Navigation Act 1853 (16 & 17 Vict. c. clxx))
West and East India Dock Act 1838 (repealed)	1 & 2 Vict. c. ix	9 May 1838
An Act to amend the several Acts relating to the West India Dock Company and the East India Dock Company; and to consolidate the said Companies. (Repealed by Port of London (Consolidation) Act 1920 (10 & 11 Geo. 5. c. clxxiii))
Cookham Bridge Act 1838	1 & 2 Vict. c. x	9 May 1838
An Act for building a Bridge over the River Thames from Cookham in the County of Berks to the opposite Shore in the County of Bucks.
Portsmouth Floating Bridge Act 1838	1 & 2 Vict. c. xi	9 May 1838
An Act for establishing a Floating Bridge or Bridges over the Harbour of Portsmouth from or near a Place called Gosport Beach, in the Parish of Alverstoke in the County of Southampton, to the opposite Shore, to or near a Place called Portsmouth Point, in the Parish of Portsmouth in the said County, with proper Approaches thereto.
Brecon Markets Act 1838 (repealed)	1 & 2 Vict. c. xii	9 May 1838
An Act for providing Market Places, and for regulating the Markets, within the Borough of Brecon in the County of Brecon. (Repealed by Brecon Markets Act 1862 (25 & 26 Vict. c. clxxxvi))
Tenby Improvement and Harbour Act 1838 (repealed)	1 & 2 Vict. c. xiii	9 May 1838
An Act for the Improvement of the Borough of Tenby in the County of Pembroke; and for regulating and maintaining the Harbour and Pier belonging thereto. (Repealed by Dyfed Act 1987 (c. xxiv))
Leominster Improvement Act 1838 (repealed)	1 & 2 Vict. c. xiv	9 May 1838
An Act to amend an Act of the Forty-eighth Year of the Reign of His Majesty King George the Third (Note: Leominster and Luston Inclosure and Improvement Act 1808 (48 Geo. 3. c. cxlviii)) relating to the Improvement of the Town of Leominster in the County of Hereford. (Repealed by Statute Law (Repeals) Act 1998 (c. 43))
Ashby-de-la-Zouch Court of Requests Act 1838 (repealed)	1 & 2 Vict. c. xv	9 May 1838
An Act for the more easy and speedy Recovery of Small Debts within the Town of Ashby-de-la-Zouch and other Places in the Counties of Leicester, Derby, Warwick, and Stafford. (Repealed by Statute Law (Repeals) Act 2013 (c. 2))
Bradford and Huddersfield Road Act 1838	1 & 2 Vict. c. xvi	9 May 1838
An Act for more effectually repairing and maintaining the Road from Top of Odsall near Bradford through Wibsey Low Moor to Huddersfield in the West Riding of the County of York.
Shrewsbury, Ellesmere and Wrexham Road Act 1838	1 & 2 Vict. c. xvii	9 May 1838
An Act for repairing, amending, and maintaining the Road from Shrewsbury, through Ellesmere in the County of Salop, to Wrexham in the County of Denbigh, and other Roads branching out of the same.
Combe Martin and Bratton Down Turnpike Road (Devon) Act 1838	1 & 2 Vict. c. xviii	9 May 1838
An Act for making a Turnpike Road from Combmartin in the County of Devon to Bratton Down in the same County, and several other Roads in the Neighbourhood thereof.
Lower King's Ferry Roads (Flint and Cheshire) Act 1838 (repealed)	1 & 2 Vict. c. xix	9 May 1838
An Act to alter and amend the Powers and Provisions of an Act (Note: Flint and Chester Roads and Lower King's Ferry Act 1835 (5 & 6 Will. 4. c. lxxxviii)) relating to the Lower King's Ferry Roads in the Counties of Flint and Chester, and for making a new Road to communicate therewith; and for other Purposes renting thereto. (Repealed by Lower King's Ferry Turnpike Roads Act 1860 (23 & 24 Vict. c. xxxii))
London and Croydon Railway (Southwark Station) Act 1838	1 & 2 Vict. c. xx	11 June 1838
An Act to enable the London and Croydon Railway Company to enlarge their Station in the Parish of Saint Olave in the Borough of Southwark in the County of Surrey, and to amend the Acts relating to the said Railway and Station.
St. Helens and Runcorn Gap Railway Act 1838	1 & 2 Vict. c. xxi	11 June 1838
An Act to enable the St Helens and Runcorn Gap Railway Company to raise a further Sum of Money, and for amending the Provisions of the several Acts relating to such Railway.
Brandling Junction Railway Act 1838	1 & 2 Vict. c. xxii	11 June 1838
An Act to enable the Brandling Junction Railway Company to ruse an additional Sum of Money.
Newcastle-upon-Tyne and Carlisle Railway Act 1838	1 & 2 Vict. c. xxiii	11 June 1838
An Act to authorize the Newcastle upon Tyne and Carlisle Railway Company to raise an additional Sum of Money for the Purposes of their Undertaking.
Cheltenham and Great Western Union Railway Act 1838	1 & 2 Vict. c. xxiv	11 June 1838
An Act to alter the Line of the Cheltenham and Great Western Union Railway, and to amend the Act (Note: Cheltenham and Great Western Union Railway Act 1836 (6 & 7 Will. 4. c. lxxvii)) relating thereto.
Manchester, Bolton and Bury Canal, Navigation and Railway Act 1838	1 & 2 Vict. c. xxv	11 June 1838
An Act for enabling the Company of Proprietors of the Manchester, Bolton, and Bury Canal Navigation and Railway to raise more Money; and for amending the Powers and Provisions of the several Acts relating thereto.
Bristol and Exeter Railway Act 1838	1 & 2 Vict. c. xxvi	11 June 1838
An Act for making several Branches in the County of Somerset from the Line of the Bristol and Exeter Railway, and for amending the Act relating to such Railway.
Taw Vale Railway and Dock Act 1838	1 & 2 Vict. c. xxvii	11 June 1838
An Act for making a Railway from Penhill in the Parish of Fremington in the County of Devon to the Town of Barnstaple, and for constructing a Dock in the said Parish of Fremington, to be called "The Taw Vale Railway and Dock."
Deal Pier Act 1838	1 & 2 Vict. c. xxviii	11 June 1838
An Act for making and maintaining a Pier or Jetty and other Works at the Town and Borough of Deal in the Parish of Deal in the County of Kent.
Bury Water Act 1838 (repealed)	1 & 2 Vict. c. xxix	11 June 1838
An Act for supplying with Water the Town of Bury, and the several Townships of Walmersley-cum-Shuttleworth, Bury, and Elton, all in the Parish of Bury in the County Palatine of Lancaster. (Repealed by Bury Waterworks Act 1846 (9 & 10 Vict. c. xxxiv))
Turton and Entwistle Reservoir Act 1838 (repealed)	1 & 2 Vict. c. xxx	11 June 1838
An Act to amend an Act for making and maintaining the Turton and Entwistle Reservoir. (Repealed by Bolton Improvement Act 1864 (27 & 28 Vict. c. cci))
Boughrood Bridge (Brecon and Radnor) Act 1838	1 & 2 Vict. c. xxxi	11 June 1838
An Act for building a Bridge over the River Wye at a Place called Boughrood Ferry, in the Counties of Brecon and Radnor^ and for making convenient Approaches thereto.
Londonderry Bridge Act 1838	1 & 2 Vict. c. xxxii	11 June 1838
An Act to amend an Act passed in the Fifth and Sixth Year of the Reign of King William the Fourth, (Note: Londonderry Bridge and Improvement Act 1835 (5 & 6 Will. 4. c. lxxiv)) regarding Londonderry Bridge; and to amend several Acts relating to the City and Port of Londonderry.
Birkenhead Improvement Act 1838 (repealed)	1 & 2 Vict. c. xxxiii	11 June 1838
An Act to amend an Act passed in the Third Year of the Reign of His late Majesty King William the Fourth, intituled "An Act for paving, lighting, watching, cleansing, and otherwise improving the Township or Chapelry of Birkenhead in the County Palatine of Chester, and for regulating the Police thereof, and for establishing a Market within the said Township." (Note: Birkenhead Improvement Act 1833 (3 & 4 Will. 4. c. lxviii)) (Repealed by Birkenhead Corporation Act 1881 (44 & 45 Vict. c. cliii))
Sheffield Streets Act 1838	1 & 2 Vict. c. xxxiv	11 June 1838
An Act for making a new Street or Thoroughfare, and widening and improving certain other Streets or Thoroughfares, within the Town and Borough of Sheffield in the County of York.
Gravesend Cemetery Act 1838	1 & 2 Vict. c. xxxv	11 June 1838
An Act for establishing a general Cemetery in the Parish of Gravesend in the County of Kent.
Oakham and Uppingham Court of Requests Act 1838 (repealed)	1 & 2 Vict. c. xxxvi	11 June 1838
An Act for the more easy and speedy Recovery of Small Debts within the Parishes of Oakham and Uppingham, and other Places, in the Counties of Rutland, Leicester, and Northampton. (Repealed by County Courts Act 1846 (9 & 10 Vict. c. 95))
Kirkby and Heversham Inclosures and Drainage Act 1838	1 & 2 Vict. c. xxxvii	11 June 1838
An Act for inclosing Lands within the Townships or Divisions of Strickland Roger, Whinfell, and Helsington in the Parish of Kirkby in Kendal in the County of Westmorland; and for draining and improving certain Lands in the said Township of Helsington, and in the Townships of Underbarrow and Bradley Field and Levens, in the Parishes of Kirkby in Kendal and Heversham in the same County.
Forest of Dean Roads Act 1838 (repealed)	1 & 2 Vict. c. xxxviii	11 June 1838
An Act for making, repairing, and maintaining certain Roads in Her Majesty's Forest of Dean, and the Waste Lands belonging to the said Forest, and in several Parishes adjoining thereto, in the County of Gloucester. (Repealed by Dean Forest Turnpike Roads Act 1858 (21 & 22 Vict. c. lxxxvi))
Buckstones and Elland, and Sykehouse and Stainland Roads Act 1838	1 & 2 Vict. c. xxxix	11 June 1838
An Act for more effectually amending and improving the Roads from Buckstones by Barkisland School to the Rochdale and Elland Turnpike Road, near the Town of Elland, and from Sykehouse to the Highway leading from Barkisland to Stainland, all in the West Riding of the County of York.
French Top and Stayley Road (Yorkshire, Cheshire) Act 1838 (repealed)	1 & 2 Vict. c. xl	11 June 1838
An Act for repairing the Road from French Top in the West Riding of the County of York to Stayley in the County Palatine of Chester. (Repealed by Annual Turnpike Acts Continuance Act 1872 (35 & 36 Vict. c. 85))
Ruscombe and Beenham Road (Berks) Act 1838	1 & 2 Vict. c. xli	11 June 1838
An Act to alter, amend, and enlarge the Powers and Provisions of an Act passed in the Seventh Year of the Reign of His late Majesty King George the Fourth, intituled "An Act for repairing the Road from the Thirty-three Mile Stone in the Parish of Ruscombe in the County of Berks, towards Reading, to a Place called The Seven Mile Stone, in the Parish of Beenham, in the said County, and a certain other Road communicating therewith." (Note: Ruscombe, Reading and Beenham Road Act 1826 (7 Geo. 4. c. lxxiii))
Salterhebble Road and Sowerby Bridge Road (West Yorkshire) Act 1838 (repealed)	1 & 2 Vict. c. xlii	11 June 1838
An Act for repairing and maintaining a Road from near Salterhebble in the Parish of Halifax to the Huddersfield and New Hey Turnpike Road in the Parish of Huddersfield, and to Sowerby Bridge in the said Parish of Halifax, all in the West Riding of the County of York, with a Bridge on the Line of the said Road. (Repealed by Annual Turnpike Acts Continuance Act 1870 (33 & 34 Vict. c. 73))
Wakefield and Halifax Roads Act 1838 (repealed)	1 & 2 Vict. c. xliii	11 June 1838
An Act for repairing and maintaining the Roads leading from Wakefield to Halifax, and from near Hipperholm Bar to near Stump Cross, all in the West Riding of the County of York. (Repealed by Annual Turnpike Acts Continuance Act 1869 (32 & 33 Vict. c. 90))
Brampton Brierley to Mexborough and Rawmarsh to Hooton Roberts Roads (Yorks.) Act 1838 (repealed)	1 & 2 Vict. c. xliv	11 June 1838
An Act for repairing and maintaining the Road leading from the South End of Angel Lane in Brampton Bierley to a certain public Highway in Mexbrough, and from Clegg's Cottage in Rawmarsh to the West End of the Village of Hooton Roberts in the County of York. (Repealed by Annual Turnpike Acts Continuance Act 1872 (35 & 36 Vict. c. 85))
Towcester and Cotton End Road Act 1838	1 & 2 Vict. c. xlv	11 June 1838
An Act for repairing, maintaining, and improving the Road leading from Towcester to the Turnpike Road in Cotton End in the Parish of Hardingston in the County of Northampton.
Thame Roads Act 1838 (repealed)	1 & 2 Vict. c. xlvi	11 June 1838
An Act for repairing and maintaining the Road from Aylesbury to Thame, and the Roads from Thame to Oxford, Shillingford, Postcomb, and Bicester, in the Counties of Buckingham and Oxford. (Repealed by Statute Law (Repeals) Act 2013 (c. 2))
Balmore Road Act 1838 (repealed)	1 & 2 Vict. c. xlvii	11 June 1838
An Act to repeal as much of an Act, intituled "An Act for making and maintaining the Road from Glasgow to Redburn Bridge, and certain other Roads, in the Counties of Stirling, Dumbarton, and Lanark," (Note: Road from Glasgow to Redburn Bridge Act 1825 (6 Geo. 4. c. cxci)) as relates to the Balmore Road; and to improve and make and maintain the said Road, and certain other Roads connected therewith, in the Parishes of Campsie and Baldernock and County of Stirling aforesaid. (Repealed by Glasgow, Kirkintilloch and Baldernock Turnpike Road Trust Act 1855 (18 & 19 Vict. c. cxli))
Quebec (Leeds) and Homefield Lane End Road Act 1838	1 & 2 Vict. c. xlviii	4 July 1838
An Act for repairing and maintaining the Road from Quebec to Homefield Lane End, all in the Parish of Leeds in the West Riding of the County of York, with a Bridge or Bridges on the Line of such Road.
Maulden Wood Corner and Westwood Gate Road (Bedfordshire) Act 1838 (repealed)	1 & 2 Vict. c. xlix	4 July 1838
An Act for repairing the Road from Maulden Wood Comer to Westwood Gate in the County of Bedford. (Repealed by Annual Turnpike Acts Continuance Act 1869 (32 & 33 Vict. c. 90))
Blackburn Gas Act 1838 (repealed)	1 & 2 Vict. c. l	4 July 1838
An Act for better lighting with Gas the Town and Township of Blackburn in the County Palatine of Lancaster. (Repealed by Blackburn Gas Act 1853 (16 & 17 Vict. c. xliv))
Exeter Commercial Gas Light and Coke Company Act 1838 (repealed)	1 & 2 Vict. c. li	4 July 1838
An Act to enable the Exeter Commercial Gas Light and Coke Company to raise a further Sum of Money. (Repealed by Exeter Gas Act 1865 (28 & 29 Vict. c. cxx))
Leicester Gas Act 1838 (repealed)	1 & 2 Vict. c. lii	4 July 1838
An Act to amend an Act of King George the Fourth, (Note: Leicester Gas Act 1821 (1 & 2 Geo. 4. c. iii)) for lighting with Gas the Borough of Leicester in the County of Leicester, and the Liberties, Precincts, and Suburbs thereof. (Repealed by Leicester Gas Act 1860 (23 & 24 Vict. c. v))
Leamington Priors Gas Act 1838 (repealed)	1 & 2 Vict. c. liii	4 July 1838
An Act for lighting with Gas the Town of Leamington Priors, and the Neighbourhood thereof, in the County of Warwick. (Repealed by Leamington Priors Gas Company's Act 1865 (28 & 29 Vict. c. cxxviii))
Lee Parish Church (Kent) Act 1838	1 & 2 Vict. c. liv	4 July 1838
An Act for the Erection of a new Church in the Parish of Lee in the County of Kent.
Lower Beeding Chapelry (Sussex) Act 1838	1 & 2 Vict. c. lv	4 July 1838
An Act for the Erection and Endowment of a Chapelry for the District of Lower Beeding in the County of Sussex, and for other Purposes.
Bolton and Preston Railway Company Act 1838	1 & 2 Vict. c. lvi	4 July 1838
An Act for enabling the Bolton and Preston Railway Company to extend and alter the Line of such Railway, and to make collateral Branches thereto, and for amending and enlarging the Powers and Provisions of the Act (Note: Bolton and Preston Railway Act 1837 (7 Will. 4 & 1 Vict. c. cxxi)) relating thereto.
Midland Counties Railway (Mountsorrel Branch) Act 1838 (repealed)	1 & 2 Vict. c. lvii	4 July 1838
An Act for amending and enlarging the Provisions of the Act (Note: Midland Counties Railway Act 1836 (6 & 7 Will. 4. c. lxxviii)) relating to the Midland Counties Railway, and for making a Branch therefrom to the Town of Mountsorrel in the County of Leicester. (Repealed by Midland Railway Consolidation Act 1844 (7 & 8 Vict. c. xviii))
Edinburgh and Glasgow Railway Act 1838 (repealed)	1 & 2 Vict. c. lviii	4 July 1838
An Act for making a Railway from Edinburgh to Glasgow, to be called "The Edinburgh and Glasgow Railway," with a Branch to Falkirk. (Repealed by Edinburgh and Glasgow Railway Consolidation Act 1852 (15 & 16 Vict. c. cix))
Grand Junction Railway Act 1838 (repealed)	1 & 2 Vict. c. lix	4 July 1838
An Act to alter, amend, extend, and enlarge the Powers and Provisions of the several Acts relating to the Grand Junction Railway, and for other Purposes connected therewith. (Repealed by London and North Western Railway Act 1846 (9 & 10 Vict. c. cciv))
Garnkirk and Glasgow Railway Act 1838	1 & 2 Vict. c. lx	4 July 1838
An Act for altering and amending several Acts relating to the Garnkirk and Glasgow Railway; and for enabling the Company to raise a further Sum of Money.
Newtyle and Coupar Angus Railway Company Act 1838	1 & 2 Vict. c. lxi	4 July 1838
An Act to enable the Newtyle and Coupar Angus Railway Company to raise a further Sum of Money.
Southampton Docks Act 1838 (repealed)	1 & 2 Vict. c. lxii	4 July 1838
An Act for extending the Time for making a Dock or Docks at Southampton. (Repealed by Southampton Docks Act 1871 (34 & 35 Vict. c. cxxx))
Southampton Pier Act 1838 (repealed)	1 & 2 Vict. c. lxiii	4 July 1838
An Act to amend and enlarge the Powers and Provisions of an Act passed in the First and Second Years of the Reign of King William the Fourth, (Note: Southampton Pier Act 1831 (1 & 2 Will. 4. c. i)) for erecting and maintaining a Pier and other Works for landing and embarking Passengers in the Port of the Town of Southampton. (Repealed by Southampton Harbour Act 1863 (26 & 27 Vict. c. cxix))
Deanhead Reservoir Act 1838 (repealed)	1 & 2 Vict. c. lxiv	4 July 1838
An Act for making and maintaining a Reservoir at Deanhead in the Parish of Huddersfield in the West Riding of the County of York, and for other Purposes relating thereto. (Repealed by Huddersfield Corporation Act 1913 (3 & 4 Geo. 5. c. xcv))
Rocester Bridge over River Dove (Staffordshire) Act 1838 (repealed)	1 & 2 Vict. c. lxv	4 July 1838
An Act for building a Bridge over the River Done at Rocester in the County of Stafford. (Repealed by Local Government Board's Provisional Orders Confirmation (No. 8) Act 1897 (60 & 61 Vict. c. lxxiii))
St. Philip's Bridge (Bristol) Act 1838	1 & 2 Vict. c. lxvi	4 July 1838
An Act for building a Bridge from the Parish of Saint Philip and Jacob over the Floating Harbour to the Parish of Temple in the City and County of Bristol.
Metropolitan Suspension Bridge Act 1838	1 & 2 Vict. c. lxvii	4 July 1838
An Act to repeal, amend, and enlarge some of the Provisions of the Act (Note: Church Street Bridge Act 1836 (6 & 7 Will. 4. c. cxxxiv)) relating to the Metropolitan Suspension Bridge.
River Tweed Bridge Act 1838 (repealed)	1 & 2 Vict. c. lxviii	4 July 1838
An Act for building a Bridge over the River Tweed between Ladykirk in the County of Berwick and Norham in the County of Durham, and for making Avenues and Approaches thereto. (Repealed by Annual Turnpike Acts Continuance Act 1884 (47 & 48 Vict. c. 52))
Hereford Improvement and Fair Act 1838 (repealed)	1 & 2 Vict. c. lxix	4 July 1838
An Act for amending the Provisions of Two Acts of Parliament relating to the City of Hereford; and for limiting the Duration of the St. Ethelbert's or Nine Days Fair held annually in the said City. (Repealed by Hereford Improvement Act 1854 (17 & 18 Vict. c. xxxi))
Ramsgate Improvement Act 1838 (repealed)	1 & 2 Vict. c. lxx	4 July 1838
An Act for better paving, lighting, watching, and improving the Pariah of Ramsgate in the County of Kent, and for regulating the Police thereof. (Repealed by County of Kent Act 1981 (c. xviii))
Refuge for the Destitute Act 1838 (repealed)	1 & 2 Vict. c. lxxi	4 July 1838
An Act to incorporate the Subscribers to the Institution called "The Refuge for the Destitute," and for the better enabling them to carry on their charitable Designs. (Repealed by Statute Law (Repeals) Act 2013 (c. 2))
St. Luke's Hospital for Lunatics Act 1838	1 & 2 Vict. c. lxxii	4 July 1838
An Act to incorporate the Governors and Subscribers to St. Luke's Hospital for Lunatics, and for better enabling them to cany on their charitable Designs.
Borrowstouness Roads (Linlithgow) Act 1838	1 & 2 Vict. c. lxxiii	4 July 1838
An Act for more effectually repairing and maintaining the Road from Borrowstouness, by the West End of Linlithgow, and by Torphichen, Bathgate, and Whitburn, to the Confines of the County of Linlithgow at or near Hollhauseburn; the Road from Borrowstouness to the River Avon; and the Road leading Eastward from Borrowstouness to Champany, by the Kirk of Carriden in the County of Linlithgow.
Dundalk and Dunleer Road Act 1838 (repealed)	1 & 2 Vict. c. lxxiv	4 July 1838
An Act for more effectually repairing the Road from Dundalk (Note: Dundalk, County Louth.) to Dunleer (Note: Dunleer, County Louth.) in the County of Louth. (Repealed by Turnpike Trusts Abolition (Ireland) Act 1857 (20 & 21 Vict. c. 16))
Rugby and Lutterworth Turnpike Road Act 1838	1 & 2 Vict. c. lxxv	4 July 1838
An Act for repairing and maintaining the Road from Lutterworth Hand on the Wattling Street Road, through Churchover, Browmsover, Newbold-upon-Avon, Rugby, and Biltong in the County of Warwick, to the Turnpike Road between Dunchurch and Hillmorton in the said County.
Wadsley and Langset Turnpike Road (West Yorkshire) Act 1838	1 & 2 Vict. c. lxxvi	4 July 1838
An Act to repeal the Wadsley and Langset Turnpike Road Act (Note: Wadsley and Langset Turnpike Road Extension Act 1823 (4 Geo. 4. c. lxxvii)) so far as relates to the Wadsley and Langset District of the said Road in the West Riding of the County of York, and to make new Provisions in lieu thereof; and also for extending the said District of Road to or near to Moorfields in the Pariah of Sheffield; and for other Purposes.
Kirkstall, Ilkley and Shipley Road Act 1838	1 & 2 Vict. c. lxxvii	4 July 1838
An Act to vary and alter the Lines of the Kirkstall, Ilkley, and Shipley District of Road, and for making a new Road from the Otley Branch Road in the said District to Burley in the Parish of Otley, all in the West Riding of the County of York.
South Holland Drainage and Road from Spalding High Bridge Act 1838	1 & 2 Vict. c. lxxviii	4 July 1838
An Act for amending an Act of King George the Third, for draining Lands in South Holland, and for repairing and maintaining the Road from Spalding High Bridge to Brother House, in the County of Lincoln.
Roads in Caithness Act 1838 (repealed)	1 & 2 Vict. c. lxxix	4 July 1838
An Act for altering and amending an Act of the Eleventh Year of the Reign of His Majesty King George the Fourth, intituled "An Act for making, repairing, widening, and keeping in repair certain Roads and Bridges in the County of Caithness; and for better regulating and rendering more effectual the Statute Labour in the said County and Conversion Money in lieu thereof." (Note: Roads in Caithness Act 1830 (11 Geo. 4 & 1 Will. 4. c. cii)) (Repealed by Caithness Roads Act 1860 (23 & 24 Vict. c. cci))
Festiniog Railway Act 1838 (repealed)	1 & 2 Vict. c. lxxx	27 July 1838
An Act for granting further Powers to the Festiniog Railway Company. (Repealed by Festiniog Railway Act 1869 (32 & 33 Vict. c. cxli))
Eastern Counties Railway Act 1838	1 & 2 Vict. c. lxxxi	27 July 1838
An Act to amend and enlarge the Powers and Provisions of the Act (Note: Eastern Counties Railway Act 1836 (6 & 7 Will. 4. c. cvi)) relating to the Eastern Counties Railway.
Birmingham and Derby Junction Railway Act 1838	1 & 2 Vict. c. lxxxii	27 July 1838
An Act to alter the Line of the Birmingham and Derby Junction Railway.
Holborn Bridge to Clerkenwell Green Street Act 1838	1 & 2 Vict. c. lxxxiii	27 July 1838
An Act for making a new Street from Holborn Bridge in the City of London towards Clerkenwell Green.
Newquay (Cornwall) Pier and Harbour Act 1838	1 & 2 Vict. c. lxxxiv	27 July 1838
An Act for maintaining the Pier and Harbour of Newquay in the County of Cornwall.
Fishguard Harbour Act 1838	1 & 2 Vict. c. lxxxv	27 July 1838
An Act to repeal an Act of the last Session of Parliament, (Note: Fishguard Harbour and Port Act 1837 (7 Will. 4 & 1 Vict. c. cxxiv)) for improving the Harbour of Fishguard in the County of Pembroke.
Glasgow Waterworks Company Act 1838	1 & 2 Vict. c. lxxxvi	27 July 1838
An Act to alter and amend, and in part repeal, the Powers of certain Acts for supplying the City of Glasgow and Suburbs with Water; to enable the Company of Proprietors of the Glasgow Waterworks to purchase the Cranstonhill Waterworks, and to raise a further Sum of Money; and to alter the Rates leviable by the said Company of Proprietors.
Donegal and Londonderry Drainage Act 1838	1 & 2 Vict. c. lxxxvii	27 July 1838
An Act for draining and embanking certain Lands in Lough Swilly and Lough Foyle in the Counties of Donegal and Londonderry.
Pembroke Ferry Act 1838	1 & 2 Vict. c. lxxxviii	27 July 1838
An Act for establishing a Steam Communication over Milford Haven at or near Pembroke Ferry in the County of Pembroke.
Kent and Surrey Court of Requests Act 1838 (repealed)	1 & 2 Vict. c. lxxxix	27 July 1838
An Act to amend an Act (Note: Surrey and Kent Courts of Request Act 1836 (6 & 7 Will. 4. c. 120)) for the Amendment of Four several Acts passed in the Fifth, (Note: Small Debts, Blackheath, etc. Act 1765 (5 Geo. 3. c. 8)) Sixth, (Note: Small Debts, Kent, etc. Act 1766 (6 Geo. 3. c. 6)) Tenth, (Note: Blackheath, etc., Small Debts Act 1770 (10 Geo. 3. c. 29)) and Forty-seventh Years (Note: Blackheath, &c. Court of Requests Act 1807 (47 Geo. 3 Sess. 1. c. iv)) of the Reign of His late Majesty King George the Third, for the Recovery of Small Debts within the Hundreds of Blackheath, of Bromley and Beckenham, of Rokesky otherwise Ruxley, and of Little and Lesness, in the County of Kent, and within the Hundred of Wallington in the County of Surrey; and to extend the Powers thereof. (Repealed by County Courts Act 1846 (9 & 10 Vict. c. 95))
Barnsley Court of Requests Act 1838 (repealed)	1 & 2 Vict. c. xc	27 July 1838
An Act for the more easy and speedy Recovery of Small Debts within the Town of Barnsley and other Places in the West Riding of the County of York. (Repealed by County Courts Act 1846 (9 & 10 Vict. c. 95))
Ashby-de-la-Zouch Court of Requests (Amendment) Act 1838 (repealed)	1 & 2 Vict. c. xci	27 July 1838
An Act to rectify a Mistake in an Act passed in the present Session of Parliament, (Note: Ashby-de-la-Zouch Court of Requests Act 1838 (1 & 2 Vict. c. xv)) for the Recovery of Small Debts within the Town of Ashby-de-la-Zouch and other Places in the Counties of Leicester, Derby, Warwick, and Stafford. (Repealed by Statute Law (Repeals) Act 2013 (c. 2))
National Loan Fund Life Assurance Society Act 1838 (repealed)	1 & 2 Vict. c. xcii	27 July 1838
An Act to enable "The National Loan Fund Life Assurance Society" to sue and be sued in the Name of the Chairman or Secretary or any One Director of the said Society. (Repealed by International Life Assurance Society Act 1855 (18 & 19 Vict. c. cxvii))
Stanningley and Leeds Road Act 1838 (repealed)	1 & 2 Vict. c. xciii	27 July 1838
An Act for repairing and maintaining the Road from the Leeds and Halifax Turnpike Road at Stanningley to the Bridge over the Leeds and Liverpool Canal, and making and maintaining a Continuation of the same Road to Water Lane in Leeds, and other Roads communicating therewith, all in the West Riding of the County of York. (Repealed by Annual Turnpike Acts Continuance Act 1869 (32 & 33 Vict. c. 90))
Junction Road between Dudley Hill and Killinghall Road and Leeds and Harrogate Turnpike Road Act 1838	1 & 2 Vict. c. xciv	27 July 1838
An Act for more effectually repairing, improving, and maintaining the Dudley Hill and Killinghall Turnpike Road, and for making a new Road therefrom to communicate with the Leeds and Harrogate Turnpike Road, all in the West Riding of the County of York.
Portfield or Poorfield Inclosure Act 1838	1 & 2 Vict. c. xcv	27 July 1838
An Act for dividing, allotting, and inclosing Common and Waste Lands called Portfield otherwise Poorfield, in the County of the Town of Haverfordwest.
Oldham Gas and Water Act 1838	1 & 2 Vict. c. xcvi	31 July 1838
An Act for enlarging and extending the Powers and altering and amending the Provisions of an Act passed in the Sixth Year of the Reign of King George the Fourth, intituled "An Act for lighting with Gas the Town of Oldham and the Neighbourhood thereof within the Parish of Prestwich-cum-Oldham in the County Palatine of Lancaster, and for the better supplying the Inhabitants of the said Town and Neighbourhood with Water." (Note: Oldham Gas and Water Act 1825 (6 Geo. 4. c. clxxi))
India Steam Ship Company Act 1838	1 & 2 Vict. c. xcvii	31 July 1838
An Act for forming and regulating a Company to be called "The India Steam Ship Company," and to enable the said Company to purchase certain Letters Patent.
Medieties of the Rectory of Liverpool Act 1838	1 & 2 Vict. c. xcviii	10 August 1838
An Act for uniting the Medieties of the Rectory of Liverpool in the County Palatine of Lancaster, and for the better Endowment thereof, and of certain Churches in the said Town.
Liverpool Civil Court of Record Act 1838 (repealed)	1 & 2 Vict. c. xcix	10 August 1838
An Act for amending certain Acts relating to the Civil Court of Record of the Borough of Liverpool, and improving the Proceedings thereof. (Repealed by Liverpool Corporation Act 1921 (11 & 12 Geo. 5. c. lxxiv))
Royal Exchange Improvement Act 1838	1 & 2 Vict. c. c	10 August 1838
An Act for improving the Site of the Royal Exchange in the City of London, and the Avenues adjoining thereto.
London and Westminster Coal Trade Act 1838 (repealed)	1 & 2 Vict. c. ci	14 August 1838
An Act to continue for Seven Years an Act for regulating the Vend and Delivery of Coals in London and Westminster, and in certain Parts of the adjacent Counties. (Repealed by City of London (Various Powers) Act 1967 (c. xlii))
Colonial Patent Sugar Company Act 1838	1 & 2 Vict. c. cii	14 August 1838
An Act for forming and establishing "The Colonial Patent Sugar Company," and to enable the said Company to purchase certain Letters Patent.

=== Private acts ===
Short title	Citation	Royal assent
Long title
Ogley Hay Inclosure Act 1838	1 & 2 Vict. c. 1 Pr.	30 March 1838
An Act for dividing, allotting, and inclosing a certain Tract of uninclosed Common or Waste Land called Ogley Hay, in the County of Stafford.
Sutton Inclosure Act 1838	1 & 2 Vict. c. 2 Pr.	11 April 1838
An Act for inclosing Lands in the Parish of Sutton in the Isle of Ely and County of Cambridge.
Quedgley Inclosure Act 1838	1 & 2 Vict. c. 3 Pr.	11 April 1838
An Act for inclosing Lands in the Parish of Quedgley in the County of Gloucester.
Turnor's Estate Act 1838	1 & 2 Vict. c. 4 Pr.	11 April 1838
An Act for authorizing the Sale of Part of the Settled Estates of Christopher Turnor Esquire, and for investing the Monies arising from such Sale in the Purchase of other more convenient Estates, to be settled to the same Uses.
Bratton Flemming Inclosure Act 1838	1 & 2 Vict. c. 5 Pr.	9 May 1838
An Act for inclosing Lands in the Parish of Bratton Fleming in the County of Devon.
Swavesey Inclosure Act 1838 (repealed)	1 & 2 Vict. c. 6 Pr.	9 May 1838
An Act for inclosing Lands in the Parish of Swavesey in the County of Cambridge. (Repealed by Swavesey Bye-ways Act 1984 (c. xii))
Linton Inclosure Act 1838	1 & 2 Vict. c. 7 Pr.	11 June 1838
An Act for inclosing Lands in the Parish of Linton in the County of Cambridge.
Witcham Inclosure Act 1838	1 & 2 Vict. c. 8 Pr.	11 June 1838
An Act for inclosing Lands in the Parish of Witcham in the Isle of Ely in the County of Cambridge.
Wickwar, &c. Inclosure Act 1838	1 & 2 Vict. c. 9 Pr.	11 June 1838
An Act for inclosing Lands in the Parishes of Wickwar, Cromhall, and Tortworth in the County of Gloucester.
Chesterton Inclosure Act 1838	1 & 2 Vict. c. 10 Pr.	11 June 1838
An Act for inclosing Lands in the Parish of Chesterton in the County of Cambridge.
Higham Ferrers Inclosure Act 1838	1 & 2 Vict. c. 11 Pr.	11 June 1838
An Act for inclosing Lands in the Parish of Higham Ferrers in the County of Northampton.
Berden, &c. Inclosure Act 1838	1 & 2 Vict. c. 12 Pr.	11 June 1838
An Act for inclosing Lands in the Parishes of Berden, Manewden, and Stansted Mountfitchet in the County of Essex.
Bishop's Castle and Munslow Inclosure Act 1838	1 & 2 Vict. c. 13 Pr.	11 June 1838
An Act for inclosing Lands in the Manors of Bishop's Castle and Munslow in the County of Salop.
Earl of Effingham's Estate Act 1838	1 & 2 Vict. c. 14 Pr.	11 June 1838
An Act for authorizing the Investment of a Fund under the Will and Codicil of the Most Noble Charles late Duke of Norfolk in the Purchase of Estates in any Part of England.
Painswick Vicarage Act 1838	1 & 2 Vict. c. 15 Pr.	11 June 1838
An Act for the Sale of the Advowson of the Vicarage of Painswick in the County of Gloucester.
Fen Drayton Inclosure Act 1838	1 & 2 Vict. c. 16 Pr.	4 July 1838
An Act for dividing, allotting, and inclosing the Open and Common Fields, Meadows, Lands, Commons, and Commonable Places in the Parish of Fen Drayton in the County of Cambridge.
Curbridge Inclosure Act 1838	1 & 2 Vict. c. 17 Pr.	4 July 1838
An Act for inclosing Lands in the Township of Curbridge in the Parish of Witney in the County of Oxford.
Gazeley Inclosure Act 1838	1 & 2 Vict. c. 18 Pr.	4 July 1838
An Act for inclosing Lands in the Parish of Gazeley in the County of Suffolk.
Pulham Inclosure Act 1838	1 & 2 Vict. c. 19 Pr.	4 July 1838
An Act for inclosing Lands in the Parishes of Pulham Saint Mary the Virgin and Pulham Saint Mary Magdalen in the County of Norfolk.
Great Warley Inclosure Act 1838	1 & 2 Vict. c. 20 Pr.	4 July 1838
An Act for inclosing Lands in the Manor of Great Warley in the several Parishes of Great Warley and Shenfield in the County of Essex.
Parry's Estate Act 1838	1 & 2 Vict. c. 21 Pr.	4 July 1838
An Act for authorizing the granting of Leases of Part of the Estates in the County of Carnarvon devised by the Will of the late Richard Parry Esquire.
Lady Glenorchy's Chapel Act 1838	1 & 2 Vict. c. 22 Pr.	4 July 1838
An Act to explain and extend the Powers of the Trustees of Lady Glenorchy's Chapel and School in Edinburgh.
Bennet's Estate Act 1838	1 & 2 Vict. c. 23 Pr.	4 July 1838
An Act for authorizing the Sale, Exchange, and Partition of the Real Estate devised by the Will of Richard Henry Alexander Bennet Esquire, deceased, and for the Application of the Produce thereof; and for authorizing the granting of Leases of the same Estate; and for authorizing the Investment in Land of the residuary Personal Estate bequeathed by the same Will; and for other Purposes.
Duke of Norfolk's Estate Act 1838	1 & 2 Vict. c. 24 Pr.	4 July 1838
An Act for giving Effect to certain Powers of Appointment over Settled Estates of the Duke of Norfolk, so that by the Exercise of such Powers the Estates to be appointed may be discharged from the Countess of Surrey's Pin Money; and for discharging certain Parts of the said Settled Estates from the Portions of the Daughters and younger Sons of the Earl and Countess of Surrey.
Macclesfield School Act 1838	1 & 2 Vict. c. 25 Pr.	4 July 1838
An Act to enable the Governors of the Possessions, Revenues, and Goods of the Free Grammar School of King Edward the Sixth in Macclesfield in the County of Chester to establish a Second School, to be called "The Modern Free School in Macclesfield in the County of Chester;" and for other Purposes.
Simpson's Estate Act 1838	1 & 2 Vict. c. 26 Pr.	4 July 1838
An Act for renewing, granting, and confirming certain joint Powers of Appointment to the Honourable John Simpson and Henry Bridgeman Simpson his eldest Son, and certain sole Powers of Appointment, and of Revocation and new Appointment, to the said Henry Bridgeman Simpson; and for establishing and confirming certain Indentures of Settlement made on the Marriage of the said Henry Bridgeman Simpson respectively affecting the Estates of the said John Simpson and Henry Bridgeman Simpson in the several Counties of Nottingham, Derby, York, and Warwick.
Traherne's Estate Act 1838	1 & 2 Vict. c. 27 Pr.	4 July 1838
An Act for effecting an Exchange of Lands in the County of Glamorgan between Morgan Popkin Traherne Esquire and the Right Honourable Sir John Nicholl Knight.
Smith's Estate Act 1838	1 & 2 Vict. c. 28 Pr.	27 July 1838
An Act for authorizing the Sale of Part of the Estates devised by the Will of Samuel Smith Esquire, deceased, and for investing the Proceeds of such Sale in the Purchase of other Estates, to be settled upon the same Trusts.
Gray's Estate Act 1838	1 & 2 Vict. c. 29 Pr.	27 July 1838
An Act to confirm a Division already made and to enable a further Division of the residuary Personal Estate of William Gray deceased, and to determine the Right of Survivorship and Contingency affecting the same.
All Souls College (Oxford) Estate Act 1838	1 & 2 Vict. c. 30 Pr.	27 July 1838
An Act for effecting an Exchange between the Warden and Fellows of the College of All Souls, Oxford, and Thomas Penrice Esquire.
Legh's Estate Act 1838	1 & 2 Vict. c. 31 Pr.	27 July 1838
An Act to authorize the making of Conveyances in Fee or Demises for long Terms of Years of Estates devised by or settled to the Uses of the Will of Thomas Peter Legh Esquire, deceased, for building on or otherwise improving the same, under yearly Rents to be reserved in the same Conveyances and Demises, and to sell certain Parts of the said Estates, and to purchase other Estates in lieu thereof, under the Control of the Court of Chancery; and for other Purposes connected with the same Estates.
Paddington Estates Act 1838	1 & 2 Vict. c. 32 Pr.	27 July 1838
An Act for enabling the Trustees of certain Lands situate in the Parish of Paddington in the County of Middlesex to grant Building Leases of the said Lands, and for other Purposes.
Sudbury Town Lands Act 1838	1 & 2 Vict. c. 33 Pr.	27 July 1838
An Act for authorizing the Mayor, Aldermen, and Burgesses of the Borough of Sudbury in the County of Suffolk to release and discharge from Shackage and Commonage certain Lands within the said Borough, and for other Purposes relating to other Lands belonging to the said Borough.
Duke of Hamilton and Brandon's Estate Act 1838	1 & 2 Vict. c. 34 Pr.	10 August 1838
An Act for authorizing the Sale and Exchange of the Real Estate devised by the Will of the Right Honourable William Henry Earl of Rochford deceased, and for the Application of the Produce thereof, and for authorizing the granting of Leases of the same Estate; and for other Purposes.
St. Saviour (Southwark) Grammar School Act 1838	1 & 2 Vict. c. 35 Pr. (Note: For 1 & 2 Vict. cc. 36 to 40 Pr. see 1837.)	16 August 1838
An Act for enabling the Governors of the Possessions, Revenues, and Goods of the Free Grammar School of the Parishioners of the Parish of Saint Saviour in Southwark in the County of Surrey to sell the old School and Schoolhouse and the Site thereof; and also for enabling the Right Reverend Charles Richard Lord Bishop of Winchester and his Lessees to grant to the said Governors another Site for the Purpose of a more convenient School and Schoolhouse and proper Offices being erected thereon.
Joly's Naturalization Act 1838 (Note: This act was not printed by the Queen's Printer.)	1 & 2 Vict. c. 41 Pr.	26 January 1838
An Act for naturalizing Frederic Joly.
Albano's Naturalization Act 1838	1 & 2 Vict. c. 42 Pr.	9 May 1838
An Act for naturalizing Benedetto Albano.
Behrens's Naturalization Act 1838	1 & 2 Vict. c. 43 Pr.	9 May 1838
An Act for naturalizing George Lewis Augustus Behrens.
Le Jeune's Naturalization Act 1838	1 & 2 Vict. c. 44 Pr.	11 June 1838
An Act for naturalizing Sophia Nelthorpe Le Jeune.
Newman's Naturalization Act 1838	1 & 2 Vict. c. 45 Pr.	11 June 1838
An Act for naturalizing Sarah Nelthorpe Newman.
Beurle's Naturalization Act 1838	1 & 2 Vict. c. 46 Pr.	11 June 1838
An Act for naturalizing Mark Ludwig Beurle.
Sibeth's Naturalization Act 1838	1 & 2 Vict. c. 47 Pr.	4 July 1838
An Act for naturalizing John Nicholas Sibeth.
Batthyany's Naturalization Act 1838	1 & 2 Vict. c. 48 Pr.	27 July 1838
An Act for naturalizing Gustavus Theodore Anthony Count Batthyany.
Grohte's Naturalization Act 1838	1 & 2 Vict. c. 49 Pr.	27 July 1838
An Act for naturalizing Frederick Rudolph Grohte.
Lethbridge's Divorce Act 1838	1 & 2 Vict. c. 50 Pr.	10 August 1838
An Act to dissolve the Marriage of Lieutenant Colonel Lethbridge with Sarah Anne his now Wife, and to enable him to marry again; and for other Purposes therein mentioned.

=== Sources ===
- The Statutes of the United Kingdom of Great Britain and Ireland, 1 & 2 Victoria. 1838. 1838 – via Internet Archive.
- The Statutes of the United Kingdom of Great Britain and Ireland, 1 & 2 Victoria. 1838. 1838 – via Google Books.
- A Collection of the Public General Statutes Passed in the Seventh Year of the Reign of His Majesty King William the Fourth and the First Year of the Reign of Her Majesty Queen Victoria, 1837, 1838. 1838 – via Internet Archive.
- Journal of the House of Commons (PDF). Vol. 93. London: His Majesty's Stationery Office. pp. 5–886 – via parliament.uk.
- Chronological Table of and Index to the Statutes. Vol. 1: To the End of the Session 59 Vict. Sess. 2 (1895) (13th ed.). London: Her Majesty's Stationery Office. 1896. pp. 290–295 – via Google Books.

== See also ==
- List of acts of the Parliament of the United Kingdom
