= Parliamentary Boroughs (England), Stamp Duty Act 1838 =

Act of the Parliament of the United Kingdom

- Act of Parliament
- Parliament of the United Kingdom
- Long title: An Act to repeal the Stamp Duty now paid on Admission to the Freedom of Corporations in England.
- Citation: 1 & 2 Vict. c. 35
- Territorial extent: England (Note: Section 1.)

Dates
- Royal assent: 4 July 1838
- Commencement: 4 July 1838
- Repealed: 1 January 1883
Other legislation
Repealed by	Municipal Corporations Act 1882

Status: Repealed

Text of statute as originally enacted

The Parliamentary Boroughs (England), Stamp Duty Act 1838 (1 & 2 Vict. c. 35) was an act of the Parliament of the United Kingdom, signed into law on 4 July 1838. It repealed the stamp duty payable on the admission of freemen by birth or servitude in city or borough constituencies.

== Subsequent development ==
The whole act was repealed by section 5 of, and the first schedule to, the Municipal Corporations Act 1882 (45 & 46 Vict. c. 50), which came into force on 1 January 1883.
