= Parsonages (Amendment) Act 1838 =

Act of the Parliament of the United Kingdom

Parsonages (Amendment) Act 1838 (Note: The citation of this act by this short title was authorised by section 1 of, and the first schedule to, the Short Titles Act 1896. Due to the repeal of those provisions it is now authorised by section 19(2) of the Interpretation Act 1978.)
- Act of Parliament
- Parliament of the United Kingdom
- Long title: An Act to supply an Omission in an Act passed in the present Session of Parliament, intituled "An Act to amend the Law for providing fit Houses for the beneficed Clergy."
- Citation: 1 & 2 Vict. c. 29
- Territorial extent: United Kingdom

Dates
- Royal assent: 4 July 1838
- Commencement: 4 July 1838 (Note: The Acts of Parliament (Commencement) Act 1793.)
- Repealed: 15 October 1930
Other legislation
Amends	Parsonages Act 1838
Repealed by	Parsonages Measure 1930

Status: Repealed

Text of statute as originally enacted

The Parsonages (Amendment) Act 1838 (1 & 2 Vict. c. 29) was an act of the Parliament of the United Kingdom, signed into law on 4 July 1838. It amended the Parsonages Act 1838 (c. 23), passed that May, by correcting a verbal omission in section 7.

== Subsequent developments ==
The whole act was repealed by section 22 of, and the schedule to, the Parsonages Measure 1930 (No. 1), which came into force on 15 October 1930.
