= List of acts of the Parliament of the United Kingdom from 1810 =

This is a complete list of acts of the Parliament of the United Kingdom for the year 1810.

Note that the first parliament of the United Kingdom was held in 1801; parliaments between 1707 and 1800 were either parliaments of Great Britain or of Ireland). For acts passed up until 1707, see the list of acts of the Parliament of England and the list of acts of the Parliament of Scotland. For acts passed from 1707 to 1800, see the list of acts of the Parliament of Great Britain. See also the list of acts of the Parliament of Ireland.

For acts of the devolved parliaments and assemblies in the United Kingdom, see the list of acts of the Scottish Parliament, the list of acts of the Northern Ireland Assembly, and the list of acts and measures of Senedd Cymru; see also the list of acts of the Parliament of Northern Ireland.

The number shown after each act's title is its chapter number. Acts passed before 1963 are cited using this number, preceded by the year(s) of the reign during which the relevant parliamentary session was held; thus the Union with Ireland Act 1800 is cited as "39 & 40 Geo. 3 c. 67", meaning the 67th act passed during the session that started in the 39th year of the reign of George III and which finished in the 40th year of that reign. Note that the modern convention is to use Arabic numerals in citations (thus "41 Geo. 3" rather than "41 Geo. III"). Acts of the last session of the Parliament of Great Britain and the first session of the Parliament of the United Kingdom are both cited as "41 Geo. 3". Acts passed from 1963 onwards are simply cited by calendar year and chapter number.

All modern acts have a short title, e.g. "the Local Government Act 2003". Some earlier acts also have a short title given to them by later acts, such as by the Short Titles Act 1896.

== 50 Geo. 3 ==
The fourth session of the 4th Parliament of the United Kingdom, which met from 23 January 1810 until 21 June 1810.

This session was also traditionally cited as 50 G. 3.

=== Public general acts ===
Short title	Citation	Royal assent
Long title
Duties on Malt, etc. Act 1810 (repealed)	50 Geo. 3. c. 1	20 February 1810
An act for continuing to His Majesty certain Duties on Malt, Sugar, Tobacco and Snuff, in Great Britain; and on Pensions, Offices and Personal Estates in England; for the Service of the Year One thousand eight hundred and ten. (Repealed by Statute Law Revision Act 1872 (No. 2) (35 & 36 Vict. c. 97))
Exchequer Bills Act 1810 (repealed)	50 Geo. 3. c. 2	12 March 1810
An act for raising the Sum of Ten millions five hundred thousand Pounds, by Exchequer Bills, for the Service of Great Britain for the Year One thousand eight hundred and ten. (Repealed by Statute Law Revision Act 1872 (No. 2) (35 & 36 Vict. c. 97))
Exchequer Bills (No. 2) Act 1810 (repealed)	50 Geo. 3. c. 3	12 March 1810
An act to indemnify such Persons in the United Kingdom as have omitted to qualify themselves for Offices and Employments, and for extending the Times limited for those Purposes respectively, until the Twenty fifth Day of March One thousand eight hundred and eleven; and to permit such Persons in Great Britain as have omitted to make and file Affidavits of the Execution of Indentures of Clerks to Attornies and Solicitors, to make and file the same on or before the First Day of Hilary Term One thousand eight hundred and eleven. (Repealed by Statute Law Revision Act 1872 (No. 2) (35 & 36 Vict. c. 97))
Indemnity Act 1810 (repealed)	50 Geo. 3. c. 4	12 March 1810
An act to indemnify such Persons in the United Kingdom as have omitted to qualify themselves for Offices and Employments, and for extending the Times limited for those Purposes respectively, until the Twenty fifth Day of March One thousand eight hundred and eleven; and to permit such Persons in Great Britain as have omitted to make and file Affidavits of the Execution of Indentures of Clerks to Attornies and Solicitors, to make and file the same on or before the First Day of Hilary Term One thousand eight hundred and eleven. (Repealed by Promissory Oaths Act 1871 (34 & 35 Vict. c. 48))
Distillation of Spirits Act 1810 (repealed)	50 Geo. 3. c. 5	12 March 1810
An act to prohibit the Distillation of Spirits from Corn or Grain in Great Britain, for a limited Time; and to continue, until Four Months after the Expiration of such Prohibition, an Act of the last Session of Parliament, (Note: Importation Act 1809 (49 Geo. 3. c. 8)) to suspend the Importation of British or Irish-made Spirits into Great Britain or Ireland respectively. (Repealed by Statute Law Revision Act 1872 (No. 2) (35 & 36 Vict. c. 97))
Cornwall Duchy Act 1810 or the Duchy of Cornwall Act 1810 (repealed)	50 Geo. 3. c. 6	12 March 1810
An act to enable His Royal Highness George Prince of Wales, to grant Leases of certain Lands and Premises called Prince's Meadows, in the Parish of Lambeth, in the County of Surrey, Parcel of His said Royal Highness's Duchy of Cornwall, for the Purpose of building thereon. (Repealed by Statute Law (Repeals) Act 1978 (c. 45))
Mutiny Act 1810 (repealed)	50 Geo. 3. c. 7	21 March 1810
An act for punishing Mutiny and Desertion; and for the better Payment of the Army and their Quarters. (Repealed by Statute Law Revision Act 1872 (No. 2) (35 & 36 Vict. c. 97))
Annuity to Duke of Wellington, etc. Act 1810 (repealed)	50 Geo. 3. c. 8	21 March 1810
An act for settling and securing a certain Annuity on Viscount Wellington and the Two next persons to whom the Title of Viscount Wellington shall descend, in Consideration of his eminent Services. (Repealed by Statute Law Revision Act 1953 (2 & 3 Eliz. 2. c. 5))
Bounty of Raw Sugar Act 1810 (repealed)	50 Geo. 3. c. 9	24 March 1810
An act to continue, until the Twenty-fifth Day of March One thousand eight hundred and eleven, so much of an Act of the Forty-seventh Year of His present Majesty, (Note: Bounties on Sugar Act 1807 (47 Geo. 3 Sess. 1. c. 22)) as allows a Bounty on British Plantation Raw Sugar exported. (Repealed by Statute Law Revision Act 1872 (No. 2) (35 & 36 Vict. c. 97))
Clandestine Running of Goods, etc. Act 1810 (repealed)	50 Geo. 3. c. 10	24 March 1810
An act for making perpetual certain of the Provisions of an Act of the Fifth Year of King George the First, (Note: Adulteration of Coffee Act 1718 (5 Geo. 1. c. 11)) for preventing the clandestine running of uncustomed Goods, and for preventing Frauds relating to the Customs. (Repealed by Statute Law Revision Act 1861 (24 & 25 Vict. c. 101))
Greenland Whale Fishery Act 1810 (repealed)	50 Geo. 3. c. 11	24 March 1810
An act to continue, until the Twenty fifth Day of March One thousand eight hundred and fifteen, several Laws relating to the Encouragement of the Greenland Whale Fisheries. (Repealed by Statute Law Revision Act 1872 (No. 2) (35 & 36 Vict. c. 97))
Importation and Exportation Act 1810 (repealed)	50 Geo. 3. c. 12	24 March 1810
An act to continue, until the Twenty fifth Day of March One thousand eight hundred and twelve, an Act made in the Forty sixth Year of His present Majesty, (Note: Importation (No. 4) Act 1806 (46 Geo. 3. c. 117)) for permitting the Importation of Masts, Yards, Bowsprits and Timber for Naval Purposes from the British Colonies in North America, Duty-free. (Repealed by Statute Law Revision Act 1872 (No. 2) (35 & 36 Vict. c. 97))
Importation and Exportation (No. 2) Act 1810 (repealed)	50 Geo. 3. c. 13	24 March 1810
An act to continue an Act, made in the Forty fourth Year of His present Majesty, (Note: Exportation (No. 3) Act 1804 (44 Geo. 3. c. 101)) for permitting the Exportation of Salt from the Port of Nassau in the Island of New Providence, the Port of Exuma and the Port of Crooked Island in the Bahama Islands, in American Ships coming in Ballast; and amend and continue an Act made in the Forty eighth Year of His present Majesty, (Note: Exportation Act 1808 (48 Geo. 3. c. 69)) for permitting Sugar and Coffee to be exported from His Majesty's Colonies or Plantations to any Port in Europe to the Southward of Cape Finisterre, and Corn to be imported from such Port, and from the Coast of Africa, into the said Colonies and Plantations, until the Twenty fifth Day of March One thousand eight hundred and thirteen. (Repealed by Statute Law Revision Act 1872 (No. 2) (35 & 36 Vict. c. 97))
Marine Mutiny Act 1810 (repealed)	50 Geo. 3. c. 14	24 March 1810
An act for the Regulation of His Majesty's Royal Marine Forces while on Shore. (Repealed by Statute Law Revision Act 1872 (No. 2) (35 & 36 Vict. c. 97))
Duties on Spirits (Ireland) Act 1810 (repealed)	50 Geo. 3. c. 15	6 April 1810
An act to grant to His Majesty Duties upon Spirits made or distilled in Ireland from Corn; to allow certain Drawbacks on the Exportation thereof; to make further Regulations for the Encouragement of Licensed Distillers; and for amending the Laws relating to the Distillery in Ireland. (Repealed by Statute Law Revision Act 1872 (No. 2) (35 & 36 Vict. c. 97))
Exportation and Importation (Ireland) Act 1810 (repealed)	50 Geo. 3. c. 16	6 April 1810
An act for further continuing, until the Twenty-fifth Day of March One thousand eight hundred and eleven, an Act of the Forty first Year of His present Majesty, (Note: Exportation, etc. Act 1801 (41 Geo. 3. (U.K.) c. 36)) for prohibiting the Exportation from Ireland, and for permitting the Importation into Ireland, Duty-free, of Corn and other Provisions. (Repealed by Statute Law Revision Act 1872 (No. 2) (35 & 36 Vict. c. 97))
Exportation and Importation (Ireland) (No. 2) Act 1810 (repealed)	50 Geo. 3. c. 17	6 April 1810
An act to continue, until the Twenty-fifth Day of March One thousand eight hundred and eleven, an Act for regulating the Drawbacks and Bounties on the Exportation of Sugar from Ireland. (Repealed by Statute Law Revision Act 1872 (No. 2) (35 & 36 Vict. c. 97))
Exportation and Importation (Great Britain) Act 1810 (repealed)	50 Geo. 3. c. 18	6 April 1810
An act for the further continuing, until the Twenty-fifth Day of March One thousand eight hundred and eleven, certain Bounties and Drawbacks on the Exportation of Sugar from Great Britain; and for suspending the Countervailing Duties and Bounties on Sugar when the Duties imposed by an Act of the Forty sixth Year of His present Majesty (Note: Duties on Certain Goods Act 1806 (46 Geo. 3. c. 42)) shall be suspended. (Repealed by Statute Law Revision Act 1872 (No. 2) (35 & 36 Vict. c. 97))
Exportation and Importation (Great Britain) (No. 2) Act 1810 (repealed)	50 Geo. 3. c. 19	6 April 1810
An act for further continuing, until the Twenty-fifth Day of March One thousand eight hundred and eleven, an Act made in the Thirty ninth Year of His present Majesty, (Note: Importation (No. 3) Act 1799 (39 Geo. 3. c. 87)) for prohibiting the Exportation from and permitting the Importation to Great Britain of Corn, and for allowing the Importation of other Articles of Provision, without Payment of Duty. (Repealed by Statute Law Revision Act 1872 (No. 2) (35 & 36 Vict. c. 97))
Quarantine Act 1810 (repealed)	50 Geo. 3. c. 20	6 April 1810
An act for removing Doubts as to the Power of appointing Superintendants of Quarantine and their Assistants. (Repealed by Customs Law Repeal Act 1825 (6 Geo. 4. c. 105))
Importation and Exportation (No. 3) Act 1810 (repealed)	50 Geo. 3. c. 21	6 April 1810
An act for amending and continuing so amended, until the Twenty-fifth Day of March One thousand eight hundred and twelve, an Act of the Forty-fifth Year of His present Majesty, (Note: Importation and Exportation Act 1805 (45 Geo. 3. c. 57)) for consolidating and extending the several Laws in force, for allowing the Importation and Exportation of certain Goods and Merchandize into and from certain Ports in the West Indies. (Repealed by Statute Law Revision Act 1872 (No. 2) (35 & 36 Vict. c. 97))
Purchase of Quays, Port of London Act 1810 (repealed)	50 Geo. 3. c. 22	6 April 1810
An act for authorizing the Lords Commissioners of the Treasury to purchase certain Quays within the Port of London. (Repealed by Statute Law (Repeals) Act 1993 (c. 50))
National Debt Act 1810 (repealed)	50 Geo. 3. c. 23	6 April 1810
An act for granting Annuities to discharge certain Exchequer Bills. (Repealed by Statute Law Revision Act 1870 (33 & 34 Vict. c. 69))
Militia (Great Britain) Act 1810 (repealed)	50 Geo. 3. c. 24	18 April 1810
An act to amend an Act, passed in the last Session of Parliament, (Note: Militia (Great Britain) (No. 2) Act 1809 (49 Geo. 3. c. 53)) for completing the Militia of Great Britain; and to make farther Provision for completing the said Militia. (Repealed by Militia Act 1816 (56 Geo. 3. c. 64))
Militia (Great Britain) (No. 2) Act 1810 (repealed)	50 Geo. 3. c. 25	18 April 1810
An act to amend several Acts, relating to the Local Militia of Great Britain. (Repealed by Local Militia (England) Act 1812 (52 Geo. 3. c. 38), Local Militia (Scotland) Act 1812 (52 Geo. 3. c. 68) and Volunteer Act 1863 (26 & 27 Vict. c. 65))
Exportation Act 1810 (repealed)	50 Geo. 3. c. 26	18 April 1810
An act for granting a Duty on Foreign Plain Linen taken out of Warehouse and exported to Foreign Parts. (Repealed by Statute Law Revision Act 1861 (24 & 25 Vict. c. 101))
Silk Manufacture (Ireland) Act 1810 (repealed)	50 Geo. 3. c. 27	18 April 1810
An act to continue, until the Twenty fifth Day of March One thousand eight hundred and thirty one, certain Acts made in the Parliament of Ireland, for the better Regulation of the Silk Manufacture. (Repealed by Silk Manufactures Act 1824 (5 Geo. 4. c. 66))
Quartering of Soldiers Act 1810 (repealed)	50 Geo. 3. c. 28	18 May 1810
An act for increasing the Rates of Subsistence to be paid to Innkeepers and others on quartering Soldiers. (Repealed by Statute Law Revision Act 1872 (No. 2) (35 & 36 Vict. c. 97))
Highways (Ireland) Act 1810 (repealed)	50 Geo. 3. c. 29	18 May 1810
An act to amend an Act of the last Session of Parliament, (Note: Highways (Ireland) Act 1809 (49 Geo. 3. c. 84)) for amending the Irish Road Acts. (Repealed by Statute Law Revision Act 1872 (No. 2) (35 & 36 Vict. c. 97))
Fees of Coroners (Ireland) Act 1810 (repealed)	50 Geo. 3. c. 30	18 May 1810
An act to regulate the Fees payable to Coroners in Ireland, upon holding inquisitions. (Repealed by Coroners' Fees (Ireland) Act 1820 (1 Geo. 4. c. 28))
Session Court (Scotland) Act 1810 (repealed)	50 Geo. 3. c. 31	18 May 1810
An act for augmenting the Salaries of the Lords of Session, Lords Commissioners of Judiciary, and Barons of Exchequer in Scotland, and Judges in Ireland. (Repealed by Statute Law Revision Act 1890 (53 & 54 Vict. c. 33))
Stage Coaches, etc. (Ireland) Act 1810 (repealed)	50 Geo. 3. c. 32	24 May 1810
An act to repeal certain Parts of several Acts of the Parliament in Ireland so far as relates to the limiting the Number of Persons to be carried by Stage Coaches or other Carriages; for enacting other Limitations in lieu thereof; and for other Purposes relating thereto. (Repealed by Summary Jurisdiction (Ireland) Act 1850 (13 & 14 Vict. c. 102))
School Sites (Ireland) Act 1810 (repealed)	50 Geo. 3. c. 33	24 May 1810
An act for enabling Tenants in Tail and for Life, and also Ecclesiastical Persons, to grant Land for the Purpose of endowing Schools in Ireland. (Repealed by Summary Jurisdiction (Ireland) Act 1850 (13 & 14 Vict. c. 102))
Exportation (No. 2) Act 1810 (repealed)	50 Geo. 3. c. 34	24 May 1810
An act for allowing the Exportation of British and Irish made Malt from one Part of the United Kingdom to the other. (Repealed by Statute Law Revision Act 1861 (24 & 25 Vict. c. 101))
Stamps Act 1810 (repealed)	50 Geo. 3. c. 35	24 May 1810
An act for altering the Mode of collecting the Duty on Insurances against Loss by Fire, upon Property in His Majesty's Islands and Possessions in the West Indies, and elsewhere beyond the Seas; and for exempting certain Bonds and Receipts from Stamp Duty, for giving Relief in certain Cases of Stamps spoiled or misused, and for explaining Part of an Act passed in the Forty eighth Year of His Majesty's Reign, (Note: Probate and Legacy Duties Act 1808 (48 Geo. 3. c. 149)) for granting Stamp Duties in Great Britain. (Repealed by Inland Revenue Repeal Act 1870 (33 & 34 Vict. c. 99))
National Debt (No. 2) Act 1810 (repealed)	50 Geo. 3. c. 36	24 May 1810
An act for granting Annuities to discharge an additional Number of Exchequer Bills. (Repealed by Statute Law Revision Act 1870 (33 & 34 Vict. c. 69))
Annuity to Duke of Brunswick Act 1810 (repealed)	50 Geo. 3. c. 37	24 May 1810
An act for enabling His Majesty to settle an Annuity on His Serene Highness the Duke of Brunswick Wolfenbuttel. (Repealed by Statute Law Revision Act 1872 (No. 2) (35 & 36 Vict. c. 97))
Bonded Warehouses (Ireland) Act 1810 (repealed)	50 Geo. 3. c. 38	2 June 1810
An act to extend the Provisions of an Act passed in the Forty eighth Year of His present Majesty's Reign, intituled, "An Act to permit certain Goods imported into Ireland to be warehoused or secured without the Duties due on the Importation thereof being first paid," (Note: Bonding Warehouses (Ireland) Act 1808 (48 Geo. 3. c. 32)) and to amend the same. (Repealed by Statute Law Revision Act 1861 (24 & 25 Vict. c. 101))
Repayment of Duty in Certain Cases Act 1810 (repealed)	50 Geo. 3. c. 39	2 June 1810
An act for repaying in certain Cases the Duty paid on the Export of Foreign Plain Linen. (Repealed by Statute Law Revision Act 1872 (No. 2) (35 & 36 Vict. c. 97))
Bounty on Exportation Act 1810 (repealed)	50 Geo. 3. c. 40	2 June 1810
An act for discontinuing the Bounty on Exportation of Oil of Vitriol, and allowing a Drawback of a Proportion of the Duties paid on the Importation of Foreign Brimstone used in taking Oil of Vitriol. (Repealed by Customs Law Repeal Act 1825 (6 Geo. 4. c. 105))
Hawkers Act 1810 (repealed)	50 Geo. 3. c. 41	2 June 1810
An act for placing the Duties of Hawkers and Pedlars under the Management of the Commissioners of Hackney Coaches. (Repealed by Hawkers Act 1888 (51 & 52 Vict. c. 33))
Isle of Man Customs Act 1810 (repealed)	50 Geo. 3. c. 42	2 June 1810
An act For consolidating the Duties Of Customs for the Isle of Man, and for placing the same under the Management of the Commissioners of Customs in England. (Repealed by Customs Law Repeal Act 1825 (6 Geo. 4. c. 105))
Highland Road and Bridges (Scotland) Act 1810 (repealed)	50 Geo. 3. c. 43	2 June 1810
An act for maintaining and keeping in Repair, Roads made and Bridges built in Scotland, under the Authority of the Parliamentary Commissioners for Highland Roads and Bridges. (Repealed by Statute Law Revision Act 1872 (No. 2) (35 & 36 Vict. c. 97))
Excise Officers (No. 7) Act 1810 (repealed)	50 Geo. 3. c. 44	2 June 1810
An act to provide for a durable Allowance of Superannuation to the Officers of Excise in Scotland, under certain Restrictions. (Repealed by Statute Law Revision Act 1861 (24 & 25 Vict. c. 101))
National Debt (No. 3) Act 1810 (repealed)	50 Geo. 3. c. 45	2 June 1810
An act for raising the Sum of Twelve Millions by way of Annuities. (Repealed by Statute Law Revision Act 1870 (33 & 34 Vict. c. 69))
Consumption of Malt Liquors (Ireland) Act 1810 (repealed)	50 Geo. 3. c. 46	9 June 1810
An act for encouraging the Consumption of Malt Liquor in Ireland. (Repealed by Duties on Spirits (Ireland) Act 1812 (52 Geo. 3. c. 46))
Insolvent Debtors (Ireland) Act 1810 (repealed)	50 Geo. 3. c. 47	9 June 1810
An act to extend and amend the Provisions of an Act made in the Thirty seventh Year of His present Majesty, (Note: Relief of Insolvent Debtors Act (Ireland) 1797 (37 Geo. 3. c. 48 (I))) for the Relief and Maintenance of Insolvent Debtors detained in Prison in Ireland. (Repealed by Statute Law Revision Act 1861 (24 & 25 Vict. c. 101))
Stage Coaches, etc. (Great Britain) Act 1810 (repealed)	50 Geo. 3. c. 48	9 June 1810
An act to repeal Three Acts, made in the Twenty eighth, (Note: Stage Coaches Act 1788 (28 Geo. 3. c. 57)) Thirtieth (Note: Stage Coaches Act 1790 (30 Geo. 3. c. 36)) and Forty sixth (Note: Stage Coaches, etc. Act 1806 (46 Geo. 3. c. 136)) Years of His present Majesty, for limiting the Number of Persons to be carried on the Outside of Stage Coaches or other Carriages, and to enact other Regulations for carrying the Objects of the said Acts into Effect. (Repealed by Stage Carriages Act 1832 (2 & 3 Will. 4. c. 120))
Poor Rate Act 1810 (repealed)	50 Geo. 3. c. 49	9 June 1810
An act to amend the Laws for the Relief of the Poor, so far as relate to the examining and allowing the Accounts of Churchwardens and Overseers by Justices of the Peace. (Repealed by Poor Law Act 1927 (17 & 18 Geo. 5. c. 14))
Relief of the Poor Act 1810 (repealed)	50 Geo. 3. c. 50	9 June 1810
An act to explain and amend an Act made in the last Session of Parliament, (Note: Poor (Settlement and Removal) Act 1809 (49 Geo. 3. c. 124)) relating to the Relief and Employment of the Poor, so far as relates to the more effectual carrying the same into Execution; and to extend the Provisions thereof to Parishes which shall not have adopted the Provisions of an Act of the Twenty second Year of His present Majesty, (Note: Relief of the Poor Act 1782 (22 Geo. 3. c. 83)) for the better Relief and Employment of the Poor. (Repealed by Statute Law Revision Act 1872 (No. 2) (35 & 36 Vict. c. 97))
Bastards Act 1810 (repealed)	50 Geo. 3. c. 51	9 June 1810
An act to repeal so much of an Act, passed in the Seventh Year of King James the First, (Note: Vagabonds Act 1609 (7 Jas. 1. c. 4)) as relates to the Punishment of Women delivered of Bastard Children; and to make other Provisions in lieu thereof. (Repealed by Statute Law Revision Act 1861 (24 & 25 Vict. c. 101))
Poor Act 1810 (repealed)	50 Geo. 3. c. 52	9 June 1810
An act to amend so much of an Act, passed in the Eighth and Ninth Year of King William the Third, (Note: Relief of the Poor Act 1696 (8 & 9 Will. 3. c. 30)) as requires poor Persons receiving Alms to wear Badges. (Repealed by Statute Law Revision Act 1872 (No. 2) (35 & 36 Vict. c. 97))
Frauds on Exportation Act 1810 (repealed)	50 Geo. 3. c. 53	9 June 1810
An act for preventing Frauds relating to the Exportation of British and Irish made Malt from one Part of the United Kingdom to the other. (Repealed by Statute Law Revision Act 1872 (No. 2) (35 & 36 Vict. c. 97))
British Fisheries Act 1810 (repealed)	50 Geo. 3. c. 54	9 June 1810
An act to revive and continue, until the Twenty fifth Day of March One thousand eight hundred and eleven, an Act of the Thirty ninth Year of His present Majesty, (Note: British Fisheries Society Act 1799 (39 Geo. 3. c. 100)) for the more effectual Encouragement of the British Fisheries. (Repealed by Sea Fisheries Act 1868 (31 & 32 Vict. c. 45))
Importation Act 1810 (repealed)	50 Geo. 3. c. 55	9 June 1810
An act to prohibit the Importation of Italian Silk Crapes and Tiffanies, and to increase the Shares of Seizures payable to Officers in respect of Foreign wrought Silks and Foreign manufactured Leather Gloves. (Repealed by Customs Law Repeal Act 1825 (6 Geo. 4. c. 105))
Pension Duties Act 1810 (repealed)	50 Geo. 3. c. 56	9 June 1810
An act to explain and amend an Act passed in the last Session of Parliament, (Note: Pension Duties Act 1809 (49 Geo. 3. c. 32)) for continuing and making perpetual several Duties of One Shilling and Six Pence in the Pound, repealed by an Act of the last Session of Parliament (Note: Pension Duties (No. 2) Act 1809 (49 Geo. 3. c. 110)) on Offices and Employments of Profit, and on Annuities, Pensions and Stipends. (Repealed by Statute Law Revision Act 1958 (6 & 7 Eliz. 2. c. 46))
Manufactures (Great Britain) Act 1810 (repealed)	50 Geo. 3. c. 57	9 June 1810
An act to revive and continue, until the Twenty fifth Day of March One thousand eight hundred and fifteen, an Act of the Twenty third Year of His present Majesty, (Note: Flax, etc., Manufacture Act 1783 (23 Geo. 3. c. 77)) for the more effectual Encouragement of the Manufacture of Flax and Cotton in Great Britain. (Repealed by Statute Law Revision Act 1872 (No. 2) (35 & 36 Vict. c. 97))
Land Tax Redemption Act 1810 (repealed)	50 Geo. 3. c. 58	9 June 1810
An act to amend several Acts for the Redemption and Sale of the Land Tax. (Repealed by Statute Law (Repeals) Act 1989 (c. 43))
Embezzlement by Collectors Act 1810 (repealed)	50 Geo. 3. c. 59	9 June 1810
An Act for more effectually preventing the Embezzlement of Money or Securities for Money belonging to the Public by any Collector, Receiver, or other Person entrusted with the Receipt, Care, or Management thereof. (Repealed by Theft Act 1968 (c. 60))
Exportation (No. 3) Act 1810 (repealed)	50 Geo. 3. c. 60	9 June 1810
An act for permitting the Exportation to Newfoundland of Foreign Salt, Duty-free, from the Import Warehouses at the Port of Bristol; and for repealing so much of an Act of the last Session as allows Salt, the Produce of any Part of Europe South of Cape Finisterre, to be shipped in any Port of Europe direct to certain Ports in North America. (Repealed by Statute Law Revision Act 1861 (24 & 25 Vict. c. 101))
Duty on Sugar, etc. Act 1810 (repealed)	50 Geo. 3. c. 61	9 June 1810
An act for making Sugar and Coffee, of Guadeloupe, Saint Eustatia, Saint Martin, and Saba, liable to the same Duty on Importation as Sugar and Coffee not of the British Plantations. (Repealed by Customs Law Repeal Act 1825 (6 Geo. 4. c. 105))
Isle of Man Smuggling Act 1810 (repealed)	50 Geo. 3. c. 62	9 June 1810
An act for the more effectual Prevention of Smuggling in the Isle of Man. (Repealed by Customs Law Repeal Act 1825 (6 Geo. 4. c. 105))
Exportation (No. 4) Act 1810 (repealed)	50 Geo. 3. c. 63	9 June 1810
An act to enable His Majesty to authorize the Exportation of the Machinery necessary for erecting a Mint in the Brazils. (Repealed by Statute Law Revision Act 1872 (No. 2) (35 & 36 Vict. c. 97))
Exportation (No. 5) Act 1810 (repealed)	50 Geo. 3. c. 64	9 June 1810
An act to permit the Removal of Goods, Wares and Merchandize, from the Port in Great Britain where first warehoused, to any other warehousing Port for the Purpose of Exportation. (Repealed by Warehousing of Goods Act 1823 (4 Geo. 4. c. 24))
Crown Lands Act 1810 (repealed)	50 Geo. 3. c. 65	9 June 1810
An act for uniting the Offices of Surveyor General of the Land Revenues of the Crown, and Surveyor General of His Majesty's Woods, Forests, Parks and Chases. (Repealed by Statute Law Revision Act 1872 (No. 2) (35 & 36 Vict. c. 97))
Postage Act 1810 (repealed)	50 Geo. 3. c. 66	9 June 1810
An act to authorize the Judge Advocate General to send and receive Letters and Packets free from the Duty of Postage. (Repealed by Post Office (Repeal of Laws) Act 1837 (7 Will. 4 & 1 Vict. c. 32))
Black Game in Somerset and Devon Act 1810 (repealed)	50 Geo. 3. c. 67	9 June 1810
An act for the better Preservation of Heath Fowl, commonly called Black Game, in the Counties of Somerset and Devon. (Repealed by Game Act 1831 (1 & 2 Will. 4. c. 32))
National Debt (No. 4) Act 1810 (repealed)	50 Geo. 3. c. 68	9 June 1810
An act for raising the Sum of One million four hundred thousand Pounds by way of Annuities, for the Service of Ireland. (Repealed by Statute Law Revision Act 1870 (33 & 34 Vict. c. 69))
Exchequer Bills (No. 3) Act 1810 (repealed)	50 Geo. 3. c. 69	9 June 1810
An act for raising the Sum of Six Millions, by Exchequer Bills, for the Service of Great Britain, for the Year One thousand eight hundred and ten. (Repealed by Statute Law Revision Act 1872 (No. 2) (35 & 36 Vict. c. 97) (Note: Incorrectly cited as "SL(R) 1972 (No. 2)" in the Chronological Table of the Statutes.))
Exchequer Bills (No. 4) Act 1810 (repealed)	50 Geo. 3. c. 70	9 June 1810
An act to enable the Commissioners of His Majesty's Treasury to issue Exchequer Bills, on the Credit of such Aids or Supplies as have been or shall be granted by Parliament for the Service of Great Britain, for the Year One thousand eight hundred and ten. (Repealed by Statute Law Revision Act 1872 (No. 2) (35 & 36 Vict. c. 97) (Note: Incorrectly cited as "SL(R) 1972 (No. 2)" in the Chronological Table of the Statutes.))
Charges of Loan, etc., of Present Session Act 1810 (repealed)	50 Geo. 3. c. 71	9 June 1810
An act for appropriating Part of the Surplus of the Stamp Duties granted in the Forty-eighth Year of His present Majesty, for defraying the Charges of the Loan made and Stock created in the present Session of Parliament. (Repealed by Statute Law Revision Act 1861 (24 & 25 Vict. c. 101))
Howth Harbour Act 1810	50 Geo. 3. c. 72	9 June 1810
An act for improving and completing the Harbour on the North Side of the Hill of Howth near Dublin, and rendering it a fit Situation for His Majesty's Packets.
Baking Trade Act 1810 (repealed)	50 Geo. 3. c. 73	9 June 1810
An act to alter, explain and amend the Laws now in force respecting the Trade of Bakers, residing out of the City of London or the Liberties thereof, or beyond Ten Miles of the Royal Exchange. (Repealed by Statute Law Revision Act 1861 (24 & 25 Vict. c. 101))
Postage (No. 2) Act 1810 (repealed)	50 Geo. 3. c. 74	15 June 1810
An act to grant to His Majesty certain additional Duties upon Letters and Packets sent by the Post within Ireland. (Repealed by Post Office (Repeal of Laws) Act 1837 (7 Will. 4 & 1 Vict. c. 32))
Window Duty (Ireland) Act 1810 (repealed)	50 Geo. 3. c. 75	15 June 1810
An act to grant to His Majesty an additional Duty on Dwelling Houses io Ireland, in respect of the Windows or Lights therein. (Repealed by Statute Law Revision Act 1861 (24 & 25 Vict. c. 101))
Stamps (Ireland) Act 1810 (repealed)	50 Geo. 3. c. 76	15 June 1810
An act to repeal certain Duties under the Care of the Commissioners for managing the Stamp Duties in Ireland, and to grant new and additional Duties, and to amend the Laws relating to the Stamp Duties in Ireland. (Repealed by Statute Law Revision Act 1861 (24 & 25 Vict. c. 101))
Customs Act 1810 (repealed)	50 Geo. 3. c. 77	15 June 1810
An act for imposing additional Duties of Customs on certain Species of Wood imported into Great Britain. (Repealed by Statute Law Revision Act 1861 (24 & 25 Vict. c. 101))
Suppression of Insurrection, etc. (Ireland) Act 1810 (repealed)	50 Geo. 3. c. 78	15 June 1810
An act to repeal an Act made in the Forty seventh Year of His present Majesty, (Note: Insurrection and Disturbances (Ireland) Act 1807 (47 Geo. 3 Sess. 2. c. 13)) for suppressing Insurrection, and preventing the Disturbances of the Publick Peace in Ireland. (Repealed by Statute Law Revision Act 1872 (No. 2) (35 & 36 Vict. c. 97))
Distillation of Spirits (Scotland) Act 1810 (repealed)	50 Geo. 3. c. 79	15 June 1810
An act for regulating the Continuance of Licences for distilling Spirits from Sugar in the Lowlands of Scotland. (Repealed by Statute Law Revision Act 1872 (No. 2) (35 & 36 Vict. c. 97) (Note: Incorrectly cited as "SL(R) 1972 (No. 2)" in the Chronological Table of the Statutes.))
Importation (No. 2) Act 1810 (repealed)	50 Geo. 3. c. 80	15 June 1810
An act for reviving and further continuing, until the Twenty fifth Day of March One thousand eight hundred and eleven, several Laws for allowing the Importation of certain Fish from Newfoundland and the Coast of Labrador, and of certain Fish from Parts of the Coast of His Majesty's North American Colonies, and for granting Bounties thereon. (Repealed by Statute Law Revision Act 1872 (No. 2) (35 & 36 Vict. c. 97) (Note: Incorrectly cited as "SL(R) 1972 (No. 2)" in the Chronological Table of the Statutes.))
Fees in Public Offices, etc. (Ireland) Act 1810 (repealed)	50 Geo. 3. c. 81	15 June 1810
An act to continue, until the First Day of August One thousand eight hundred and eleven, certain Acts for appointing Commissioners to enquire into the Fees, Gratuities, Perquisites and Emoluments received in several Publick Offices in Ireland, to examine into any Abuses which may exist in the same, and into the Mode of receiving, collecting, issuing and accounting for Publick Money in Ireland. (Repealed by Statute Law Revision Act 1872 (No. 2) (35 & 36 Vict. c. 97) (Note: Incorrectly cited as "SL(R) 1972 (No. 2)" in the Chronological Table of the Statutes.))
Flax and Hemp Seed (Ireland) Act 1810 (repealed)	50 Geo. 3. c. 82	15 June 1810
An act to amend the Laws relative to the Sale of Flax Seed and Hemp Seed to Ireland. (Repealed by Agriculture (Miscellaneous Provisions) (Northern Ireland) Order 1984 (SI 1984/702 (N.I. 2)))
Woollen Manufacture Act 1810 (repealed)	50 Geo. 3. c. 83	15 June 1810
An act to repeal several Acts respecting the Woollen Manufacture, and for indemnifying Persons liable to any Penalty for having acted contrary thereto. (Repealed by Statute Law Revision Act 1872 (No. 2) (35 & 36 Vict. c. 97))
Teinds Act 1810 (repealed)	50 Geo. 3. c. 84	15 June 1810
An act for augmenting Parochial Stipends, in certain Cases, in Scotland. (Repealed by Church of Scotland (Property and Endowments) Act 1925 (15 & 16 Geo. 5. c. 33))
Government Offices Security Act 1810 (repealed)	50 Geo. 3. c. 85	15 June 1810
An act to regulate the taking of Securities in all Offices, in respect of which Security ought to be given; and for avoiding the Grant of all such Offices, in the Event of such Security not being given within a Time to be limited after the Grant of such Office. (Repealed by Statute Law (Repeals) Act 1974 (c. 22))
East India Company Act 1810 (repealed)	50 Geo. 3. c. 86	15 June 1810
An act to amend Two Acts passed in the Thirty-ninth (Note: East India Company Act 1799 (39 Geo. 3. c. 89)) and Forty-third (Note: East India Company (No. 2) Act 1803 (43 Geo. 3. c. 63)) Years of His present Majesty, for regulating the Manner in which the East India Company shall hire and take up Ships. (Repealed by Hiring of Ships by East India Company Act 1818 (58 Geo. 3. c. 83))
Courts-Martial on Troops of East India Company Act 1810 (repealed)	50 Geo. 3. c. 87	15 June 1810
An act to amend Two Acts, relating to the raising Men for the Service of the East India Company; and the Quartering and Billetting such Men; and to Trials by Regimental Courts Martial. (Repealed by Statute Law Revision Act 1872 (No. 2) (35 & 36 Vict. c. 97) and Regulation of the Forces Act 1881 (44 & 45 Vict. c. 57))
Offices in Reversion Act 1810 (repealed)	50 Geo. 3. c. 88	15 June 1810
An act to make Provisions for a limited Time respecting certain Grants of Offices. (Repealed by Statute Law Revision Act 1872 (No. 2) (35 & 36 Vict. c. 97))
Militia Pay (Ireland) Act 1810 (repealed)	50 Geo. 3. c. 89	15 June 1810
An act for defraying, until the Twenty-fifth Day of March One thousand eight hundred and eleven, the Charge of the Pay and Clothing of the Militia of Ireland, and for making allowances in certain Cases to Subaltern Officers of the said Militia during Peace. (Repealed by Statute Law Revision Act 1872 (No. 2) (35 & 36 Vict. c. 97))
Militia and Local Militia Pay (Great Britain) Act 1810 (repealed)	50 Geo. 3. c. 90	15 June 1810
An act for defraying the Charge of the Pay and Clothing of the Militia and Local Militia in Great Britain for the Year One thousand eight hundred and ten. (Repealed by Statute Law Revision Act 1872 (No. 2) (35 & 36 Vict. c. 97))
Militia Allowances Act 1810 (repealed)	50 Geo. 3. c. 91	15 June 1810
An act to revive and continue, until the Twenty-fifth Day of March One thousand eight hundred and eleven, and amend so much of an Act made in the Thirty-ninth and Fortieth Year of His present Majesty, (Note: Militia Allowances Act 1800 (39 & 40 Geo. 3. c. 44)) as grants certain Allowances to Adjutants and Serjeant Majors of the Militia of England disembodied by an Act (Note: Militia Act 1799 (39 & 40 Geo. 3. c. 1)) of the same Session of Parliament. (Repealed by Statute Law Revision Act 1872 (No. 2) (35 & 36 Vict. c. 97))
Militia Allowances (No. 2) Act 1810 (repealed)	50 Geo. 3. c. 92	15 June 1810
An act for making Allowances in certain Cases to Subaltern Officers of the Militia in Great Britain, while disembodied. (Repealed by Statute Law Revision Act 1872 (No. 2) (35 & 36 Vict. c. 97))
Holyhead Harbour Act 1810	50 Geo. 3. c. 93	15 June 1810
An act for the improving and completing the Harbour of Holyhead, in the Isle of Anglesea.
Lotteries Act 1810 (repealed)	50 Geo. 3. c. 94	15 June 1810
An act for granting to His Majesty a Sum of Money to be raised by Lotteries. (Repealed by Statute Law Revision Act 1872 (No. 2) (35 & 36 Vict. c. 97))
Lighthouses (Ireland) Act 1810 (repealed)	50 Geo. 3. c. 95	15 June 1810
An act to enable the Corporation for preserving and improving the Port of Dublin, to erect, repair and maintain Light Houses round the Coasts of Ireland, and to raise a Fund for defraying the Charge thereof. (Repealed by Merchant Shipping Repeal Act 1854 (17 & 18 Vict. c. 120))
Quartering of Soldiers (No. 2) Act 1810 (repealed)	50 Geo. 3. c. 96	20 June 1810
An act to amend an Act passed in this Session of Parliament, intituled, "An act for increasing the Rates of Subsistence to be paid to Innkeepers and others on quartering Soldiers." (Repealed by Statute Law Revision Act 1872 (No. 2) (35 & 36 Vict. c. 97))
Importation and Exportation (Ireland) Act 1810 (repealed)	50 Geo. 3. c. 97	20 June 1810
An act to continue until the Fifth Day of July One thousand eight hundred and eleven, and to amend several Acts for granting certain Rates and Duties, and for allowing certain Drawbacks and Bounties on Goods, Wares and Merchandize imported into and exported from Ireland; and to grant to His Majesty until the said Fifth Day of July One thousand eight hundred and eleven, certain new and additional Duties on the Importation, and to allow Drawback on the Exportation of certain Goods, Wares and Merchandize into and from Ireland. (Repealed by Statute Law Revision Act 1872 (No. 2) (35 & 36 Vict. c. 97))
Treasury Bills (Ireland) Act 1810 (repealed)	50 Geo. 3. c. 98	20 June 1810
An act for raising the Sum of Two hundred and sixteen thousand Pounds by Treasury Bills, for the Service of Ireland, for the Year One thousand eight hundred and ten. (Repealed by Statute Law Revision Act 1872 (No. 2) (35 & 36 Vict. c. 97))
Making of Malt, etc. (Ireland) Act 1810 (repealed)	50 Geo. 3. c. 99	20 June 1810
An act to amend the several Acts relating to the making of Malt, and the granting of Permits and Certificates, and the Regulations of Braziers and of Persons employing more than one Still in Ireland. (Repealed by Illicit Distillation (Ireland) Act 1831 (1 & 2 Will. 4. c. 55))
Fines on Stills (Ireland) Act 1810 (repealed)	50 Geo. 3. c. 100	20 June 1810
An act for respiting certain Fines imposed on Stills in Ireland. (Repealed by Statute Law Revision Act 1872 (No. 2) (35 & 36 Vict. c. 97) (Note: Incorrectly cited as "SL(R) 1972 (No. 2)" in the Chronological Table of the Statutes.))
Prisage and Butlerage (Ireland) Act 1810 (repealed)	50 Geo. 3. c. 101	20 June 1810
An act for confirming an Agreement for the Purchase of the Prisage and Butlerage of Wines in Ireland, entered into by the Commissioners of His Majesty's Treasury in Ireland, and the Right Honourable Walter Earl of Ormonde and Ossory and his Trustees, in pursuance of an Act made in the Forty sixth Year of His present Majesty's Reign. (Note: Duties of Prisage and Butlerage (Ireland) Act 1806 (46 Geo. 3. c. 94)) (Repealed by Statute Law Revision Act 1872 (No. 2) (35 & 36 Vict. c. 97))
Unlawful Oaths (Ireland) Act 1810 or the Unlawful Oaths Act 1810 (repealed)	50 Geo. 3. c. 102	20 June 1810
An act for the more effectually preventing the administering and taking of unlawful Oaths in Ireland; and for the Protection of Magistrates and Witnesses in Criminal Cases. (Repealed by Statute Law (Repeals) Act 1981 (c. 19))
Prisons (Ireland) Act 1810 (repealed)	50 Geo. 3. c. 103	20 June 1810
An act for repealing the several Laws relating to Prisons in Ireland, and for re-enacting such of the Provisions thereof as have been found useful, with Amendments. (Repealed by Prisons (Ireland) Act 1826 (7 Geo. 4. c. 74))
Assessed Taxes Act 1810 (repealed)	50 Geo. 3. c. 104	20 June 1810
An act for altering the Amount of certain Duties of Assessed Taxes granted by an Act passed in the Forty eighth Year of His present Majesty's Reign, (Note: House Tax Act 1808 (48 Geo. 3. c. 55)) and for granting to His Majesty certain other Duties of Assessed Taxes on the Articles therein mentioned. (Repealed by Revenue Act 1869 (32 & 33 Vict. c. 14))
Taxes Act 1810 (repealed)	50 Geo. 3. c. 105	20 June 1810
An act to regulate the manner of making Surcharges of the Duties of Assessed Taxes, and of the Tax upon the Profits arising from Property, Professions, Trades and Offices, and for amending the Acts relating to the said Duties respectively. (Repealed by Taxes Management Act 1880 (43 & 44 Vict. c. 19))
Income Tax, etc. Act 1810 (repealed)	50 Geo. 3. c. 106	20 June 1810
An act for regulating the manner of assessing Lands in certain Cases to the Duties arising from the Profits of Property, Professions, Trades and Offices, and for giving Relief from the said Duties on occasion of Losses in other Cases therein mentioned. (Repealed by Statute Law Revision Act 1872 (No. 2) (35 & 36 Vict. c. 97))
Clothing of the Army, etc. Act 1810 (repealed)	50 Geo. 3. c. 107	20 June 1810
An act to regulate the Examination and Payment of Assignments for Clothing of His Majesty's Forces. (Repealed by Statute Law Revision Act 1872 (No. 2) (35 & 36 Vict. c. 97))
Sea Fisheries (Scotland) Act 1810 (repealed)	50 Geo. 3. c. 108	20 June 1810
An act to amend and enlarge the Powers of an Act passed in the Second Year of His present Majesty, (Note: Fish Carriage Act 1762 (2 Geo. 3. c. 15)) for the Encouragement of the Fisheries of this Kingdom, and the Protection of the Persons employed therein. (Repealed by Inshore Fishing (Scotland) Act 1984 (c. 26))
Arms (Ireland) Act 1810 (repealed)	50 Geo. 3. c. 109	20 June 1810
An act to continue for Two Years, and from thence until the End of the then next Session of Parliament, and amend an Act made in the Forty seventh Year of His present Majesty, (Note: Possession of Arms (Ireland) Act 1807 (47 Geo. 3 Sess. 2. c. 54)) for the preventing improper Persons from having Arms in Ireland. (Repealed by Arms, etc. (Ireland) Act 1843 (6 & 7 Vict. c. 74))
Bringing of Coals, etc., to London, etc. Act 1810 (repealed)	50 Geo. 3. c. 110	20 June 1810
An act to allow, until the First Day of August One thousand eight hundred and eleven, the bringing of Coals, Culm and Cinders to London and Westminster by inland Navigation. (Repealed by Customs Law Repeal Act 1825 (6 Geo. 4. c. 105))
Pensions (Scotland) Act 1810 (repealed)	50 Geo. 3. c. 111	20 June 1810
An act to limit the Amount of Pensions to be granted out of the Civil List of Scotland. (Repealed by Statute Law Revision Act 1872 (No. 2) (35 & 36 Vict. c. 97))
Court of Session Act 1810 (repealed)	50 Geo. 3. c. 112	20 June 1810
An Act for abridging the form of extracting Decrees of the Court of Session in Scotland, and for the Regulation of certain Parts of the Proceedings of that Court. (Repealed by Court of Session Act 1988 (c. 36))
Exchequer Bills (No. 5) Act 1810 (repealed)	50 Geo. 3. c. 113	20 June 1810
An act for enabling His Majesty to raise the Sum of Three Millions for the Service of Great Britain. (Repealed by Statute Law Revision Act 1872 (No. 2) (35 & 36 Vict. c. 97))
Exchequer Bills (East India Company) Act 1810 (repealed)	50 Geo. 3. c. 114	20 June 1810
An act for granting to His Majesty a Sum of Money, to be raised by Exchequer Bills, and to be advanced and applied in the manner and upon the Terms therein mentioned, for the Relief of the United Company of Merchants of England trading to the East Indies. (Repealed by Statute Law Revision Act 1872 (No. 2) (35 & 36 Vict. c. 97))
Appropriation Act 1810 (repealed)	50 Geo. 3. c. 115	20 June 1810
An act for granting to His Majesty certain Sums of Money out of the Consolidated Fund of Great Britain, and for applying certain Monies therein mentioned, for the Service of the Year One thousand eight hundred and ten; and for further appropriating the Supplies granted in this Session of Parliament. (Repealed by Statute Law Revision Act 1872 (No. 2) (35 & 36 Vict. c. 97))
New Forest Act 1810 (repealed)	50 Geo. 3. c. 116	20 June 1810
An act to extend and amend the Term and Provisions of an Act of the Thirty ninth and Fortieth Year of His present Majesty, (Note: New Forest Act 1800 (39 & 40 Geo. 3. c. 86)) for the better Preservation of Timber in the New Forest, in the County of Southampton, and for ascertaining the Boundaries of the said Forest, and of the Lands of the Crown within the same. (Repealed by Wild Creatures and Forest Laws Act 1971 (c. 47))
Public Salaries, etc. Act 1810 (repealed)	50 Geo. 3. c. 117	21 June 1810
An act to direct that Accounts of Increase and Diminution of Publick Salaries, Pensions and Allowances, shall be annually laid before Parliament, and to regulate and control the granting and paying of such Salaries, Pensions and Allowances. (Repealed by Superannuation Act 1834 (4 & 5 Will. 4. c. 24))
Admiralty and Prize Courts Act 1810 (repealed)	50 Geo. 3. c. 118	21 June 1810
An act for regulating the Offices of Registrars of Admiralty and Prize Courts. (Repealed by High Court of Admiralty (England) Act 1840 (3 & 4 Vict. c. 66))
Houses of Parliament Act 1810	50 Geo. 3. c. 119	21 June 1810
An act for further amending and enlarging the Powers of an Act of the Forty sixth Year of His present Majesty, (Note: Houses of Parliament Act 1806 (46 Geo. 3. c. 89)) for consolidating and rendering more effectual the several Acts for the Purchase of Buildings, and further Improvement of the Streets and Places near to Westminster Hall and the Two Houses of Parliament.

=== Local acts ===
Short title	Citation	Royal assent
Long title
Cumberland County Rate Act 1810 (repealed)	50 Geo. 3. c. i	12 March 1810
An Act for making a fair and equal County Rate for the County of Cumberland. (Repealed by Statute Law (Repeals) Act 2008 (c. 12))
Road from Cheltenham to Bishop's Cleve Act 1810 (repealed)	50 Geo. 3. c. ii	12 March 1810
An Act for making and maintaining a Road from Albion Street in the Town of Cheltenham in the County of Gloucester, to Bunch Lane in or near the Village of Bishop's Cleve, in the said County, to join the Turnpike Road leading from the Town of Evesham in the County of Worcester, to the said Town of Cheltenham. (Repealed by Road from Cheltenham to Bishop's Cleeve Act 1831 (1 Will. 4. c. xviii))
Road between Durham and Shotley Bridge Act 1810 (repealed)	50 Geo. 3. c. iii	12 March 1810
An Act for altering, improving and keeping in Repair the Road between the City of Durham and the Village of Shotley Bridge, in the County of Durham. (Repealed by Durham and Shotley Bridge Road Act 1831 (1 & 2 Will. 4. c. xxii))
Roxburgh County Hall and Justiciary Act 1810	50 Geo. 3. c. iv	12 March 1810
An Act for erecting a Justiciary and County Hall and other Offices for the County of Roxburgh.
Norton Folgate Improvement Act 1810 (repealed)	50 Geo. 3. c. v	12 March 1810
An Act for repealing an Act, made in the Thirty second Year of His late Majesty, (Note: Norton Folley, Middlesex (Lighting, etc.) Act 1758 (32 Geo. 2. c. 42)) for better lighting and cleansing the Open Places, Streets, Squares and other Passages within the Part of the Manor and Liberty of Norton Folgate otherwise Norton Folley, in the County of Middlesex, which is Extra-parochial, and regulating the Nightly Watch and Beadles therein; and for the better Relief and Maintenance of the Poor thereof; and for other Purposes relating thereto. (Repealed by London Government (Borough of Stepney) Order in Council 1901 (SR&O 1901/276))
Road from Carlisle to Mulaside Act 1810	50 Geo. 3. c. vi	12 March 1810
An Act for enlarging the Term and Powers of Two Acts of His present Majesty, (Note: Cumberland Roads Act 1766 (7 Geo. 3. c. 83)) (Note: Cumberland Roads Act 1789 (29 Geo. 3. c. 97)) for repairing the Road from Shaddon Gate near Carlisle to Mulaside, and to join the Turnpike Road at Skillbeck, in the County of Cumberland.
Catterick Bridge to Durham Road Act 1810 (repealed)	50 Geo. 3. c. vii	12 March 1810
An Act for repairing the Road from Catterick Bridge in the County of York, through the Towns of Yarm, Stockton and Sedgefield, to the City of Durham in the County of Durham, and for repealing an Act passed in the Twenty eighth Year of His present Majesty (Note: Catterick Bridge to Durham Road Act 1788 (28 Geo. 3. c. 90)) for repairing the said Road. (Repealed by Catterick Bridge and Durham Road Act 1830 (11 Geo. 4 & 1 Will. 4. c. xxvi))
Road from Doncaster to Tadcaster Cross Act 1810 (repealed)	50 Geo. 3. c. viii	12 March 1810
An Act for continuing the Term and altering and enlarging the Powers of several Acts of His late and present Majesty for repairing the several Roads therein mentioned so far as the said Acts relate to the Road from Doncaster through Ferrybridge to the South Side of Tadcaster Cross in the County of York. (Repealed by Road from Doncaster to Tadcaster Cross Act 1831 (1 & 2 Will. 4. c. xv))
Chieveley Inclosure Act 1810	50 Geo. 3. c. ix	21 March 1810
An Act for inclosing Lands in the Township or Hamlet of Chieveley, in the Manor and Parish of Chieveley, in the County of Berks.
Drogheda Harbour Act 1810	50 Geo. 3. c. x	21 March 1810
An Act to continue and amend Three Acts (Note: Port of Drogheda Act 1790 (30 Geo. 3. c. 39 (I))) (Note: Borough of Drogheda Act 1797 (37 Geo. 3. c. 56 (I))) (Note: Drogheda Harbour Act 1808 (48 Geo. 3. c. cvi)) for the Improvement of the Port and Harbour of Drogheda.
Road from Buckland Dinham and from Kilmersdon Act 1810 (repealed)	50 Geo. 3. c. xi	21 March 1810
An Act to enlarge the Term and Powers of Two Acts of His present Majesty, so far as the same relate to the Road from Buckland Dinham to Radford Bridge, and from Midsomer Norton to Norton Saint Phillip, and from Kilmersdon to Radstock in the County of Somerset. (Repealed by Roads from Radstock Act 1830 (11 Geo. 4 & 1 Will. 4. c. xxxiv))
Road from Bury to Blackburn and Branches Act 1810 (repealed)	50 Geo. 3. c. xii	21 March 1810
An Act for continuing the Term and amending Two Acts passed in the Twenty ninth (Note: Lancaster Roads Act 1789 (29 Geo. 3. c. 107)) and Thirty fifth (Note: Lancaster Roads Act 1795 (35 Geo. 3. c. 144)) Years of His present Majesty, for amending the several Roads therein described, so far as the said Acts relate to the District of Road from Bury to Haslingden, and from thence to Blackburn and Whalley, all in the County Palatine of Lancaster; and also for making a Branch of Road from Portfield to the West End of the Town of Padiham, in the same County. (Repealed by Roads from Bury to Blackburn and Branches Act 1827 (7 & 8 Geo. 4. c. xxviii))
Louth Roads Act 1810 (repealed)	50 Geo. 3. c. xiii	21 March 1810
An Act for continuing the Term and altering and enlarging the Powers of Two Acts, passed in the Tenth (Note: Louth Roads Act 1770 (10 Geo. 3. c. 109)) and Twentieth (Note: Louth Roads Act 1780 (20 Geo. 3. c. 94)) Years of His present Majesty, for repairing and widening several Roads leading from the Town of Louth, in the County of Lincoln. (Repealed by Roads from Saltfleet to Lincoln Act 1830 (11 Geo. 4 & 1 Will. 4. c. ciii))
Titchfield and Cosham Road Act 1810 (repealed)	50 Geo. 3. c. xiv	21 March 1810
An Act for repairing, altering and improving the Road from Titchfield to Cosham, in the County of Southampton. (Repealed by Titchfield and Cosham Road Act 1831 (1 Will. 4. c. lxi))
Wakefield to Aberford Road Act 1810 (repealed)	50 Geo. 3. c. xv	21 March 1810
An Act for continuing the Term, and altering and enlarging the Powers of Two Acts, passed in the Twenty ninth (Note: Wakefield to Abberford Road Act 1789 (29 Geo. 3. c. 86)) and Thirty third (Note: Wakefield to Abberford Road Act 1793 (33 Geo. 3. c. 179)) Years of His present Majesty, for repairing and widening the Road from Wakefield to Abberford in the County of York. (Repealed by Wakefield and Aberford Road Act 1831 (1 Will. 4. c. xxxv))
Stirling Roads Act 1810 (repealed)	50 Geo. 3. c. xvi	21 March 1810
An Act for continuing the Term, and altering the Powers of an Act made in the Thirty fourth Year of His present Majesty, for making and repairing several Roads leading across the County of Stirling. (Repealed by Roads in Stirling Act 1831 (1 & 2 Will. 4. c. xxxviii))
Whitesheet Hill and Barford Road Act 1810 (repealed)	50 Geo. 3. c. xvii	21 March 1810
An Act for enlarging the Term and Powers of an Act of His present Majesty, for repairing the Road from the Bottom of Whitesheet Hill, to the Wilton Turnpike Road at or near Barford in the County of Wilts. (Repealed by Whitesheet Hill and Barford Turnpike Road Act 1830 (11 Geo. 4 & 1 Will. 4. c. lxxxviii))
Shoreham (Kent) Road Act 1810 (repealed)	50 Geo. 3. c. xviii	21 March 1810
An Act for repairing the Road leading from the Eynsford Turnpike Road in the Parish of Shoreham, in the County of Kent, to the Turnpike Road leading from Sevenoaks to Bromley, in the said County. (Repealed by Road from the Eynesford Turnpike Road to Farnborough Act 1811 (51 Geo. 3. c. ccv))
Lambeth Poor and Other Rates Act 1810 (repealed)	50 Geo. 3. c. xix	24 March 1810
An Act for better affecting and collecting the Poor and other Rates, in the Parish of Lambeth, in the County of Surrey; and regulating the Poor thereof. (Repealed by London Government (Borough of Lambeth) Order in Council 1901 (SR&O 1901/219))
Southampton Waterworks Act 1810 (repealed)	50 Geo. 3. c. xx	24 March 1810
An Act to alter and amend Two Acts, passed in the Twentieth Year of His late Majesty (Note: Southampton Water Supply Act 1746 (20 Geo. 2. c. 15)) and the Forty third Year of His present Majesty, (Note: Southampton Waterworks Act 1803 (43 Geo. 3. c. xxxii)) for maintaining the Publick Conduits and other Water Works belonging to the Town of Southampton. (Repealed by Southampton Waterworks Act 1836 (6 & 7 Will. 4. c. xcvi))
Dorchester Roads Act 1810 (repealed)	50 Geo. 3. c. xxi	6 April 1810
An Act to continue and amend Two Acts of the Ninth and Thirtieth Years of His present Majesty, for repairing several Roads leading from the Borough of Dorchester, in the County of Dorset. (Repealed by Wool Bridge and Dorchester Road Act 1830 (11 Geo. 4 & 1 Will. 4. c. xxiv))
Road from the Winchester and Southampton Road Act 1810 (repealed)	50 Geo. 3. c. xxii	6 April 1810
An Act for making and maintaining a Road from Lower Saint Cross Mill Lane, (on the Road from the City of Winchester to the Town of Southampton) to Park Gate, on the Road from Southampton to Gosport, in the County of Southampton. (Repealed by Road from the Winchester and Southampton Road Act 1831 (1 Will. 4. c. xvii))
Great Yarmouth Improvement Act 1810	50 Geo. 3. c. xxiii	6 April 1810
An Act for better paving, lighting, cleaning and watching the Town of Great Yarmouth, in the County of Norfolk, and for removing Nuisances and Annoyances therein, and for making other Improvements in the said Town.
Ellesmere Canal (Whitchurch Extension) Act 1810 (repealed)	50 Geo. 3. c. xxiv	6 April 1810
An Act to enable the Company of Proprietors of the Ellesmere Canal to extend the Whitchurch Line of the said Canal from Sherryman's Bridge to Castle Well, in the Town of Whitchurch, in the County of Salop; and for amending the several Acts for making the said Canal. (Repealed by Ellesmere and Chester Canal Act 1827 (7 & 8 Geo. 4. c. cii))
Bishop Wearmouth Improvement Act 1810 (repealed)	50 Geo. 3. c. xxv	6 April 1810
An Act for lighting and watching the Town of Bishop Wearmouth and Bishop Wearmouth Panns, for cleaning, paving and regulating the Footpaths, and for removing and preventing Nuisances and Encroachments therein. (Repealed by Borough of Sunderland Act 1851 (14 & 15 Vict. c. lxvii))
Dover Improvement Act 1810 (repealed)	50 Geo. 3. c. xxvi	6 April 1810
An Act to amend an Act made in the Eighteenth Year of His present Majesty, (Note: Dover Streets Act 1778 (18 Geo. 3. c. 76)) for paving, cleansing, lighting and watching the Town of Dover, and for removing and preventing Nuisances and Annoyances therein. (Repealed by County of Kent Act 1981 (c. xviii))
Sunderland Improvement, Market and River Wear Watch Act 1810 (repealed)	50 Geo. 3. c. xxvii	6 April 1810
An Act for paving, lighting, watching and cleansing the Town of Sunderland near the Sea, in the County of Durham; for removing the Market; for building a Town Hall or Market House; and for otherwise improving the said Town; and for establishing a Watch on the River Wear. (Repealed by Borough of Sunderland Act 1851 (14 & 15 Vict. c. lxvii))
Westminster Sunday Tolls Act 1810 (repealed)	50 Geo. 3. c. xxviii	6 April 1810
An Act to revive and continue the Term and Powers of an Act (Note: Westminster Streets Act 1765 (5 Geo. 3. c. 13)) passed for empowering the Commissioners for paving, cleansing and lighting the Squares, Streets and Lanes within the City and Liberty of Westminster and Parts adjacent, to collect certain Tolls on Sundays upon the several Roads therein mentioned. (Repealed by Statute Law (Repeals) Act 2008 (c. 12))
Kincardine Harbour Act 1810	50 Geo. 3. c. xxix	6 April 1810
An Act for constructing a Pier or Harbour at or near the Town of Kincardine, in the County of Perth.
Halifax Market Act 1810 (repealed)	50 Geo. 3. c. xxx	6 April 1810
An Act for regulating the New Market Place in the Town of Halifax, in the Weft Riding of the County of York. (Repealed by Halifax Improvement Act 1853 (16 & 17 Vict. c. clxvii))
Laneham Drainage Act 1810	50 Geo. 3. c. xxxi	6 April 1810
An Act for amending and rendering more effectual an Act, of the Ninth Year of His present Majesty, (Note: Nottinghamshire (Laneham, Rampton, &c.) Inclosures Act 1769 (9 Geo. 3. c. 104 Pr.)) for embanking, draining and preserving certain Low Grounds in the Parish of Laneham, and other Parishes and Places therein mentioned, in the County of Nottingham.
Provident Institution Act 1810 (repealed)	50 Geo. 3. c. xxxii	6 April 1810
An Act to alter and explain an Act made in the Forty seventh Year of His present Majesty, (Note: Provident Institution Act 1807 (47 Geo. 3 Sess. 1. c. xxxiv)) to enable the Provident Institution to sue in the Name of their Managing Director, and to enrol Annuities. (Repealed by Provident Life Office Act 1889 (52 & 53 Vict. c. cxliii))
Clyde Marine Society Act 1810 (repealed)	50 Geo. 3. c. xxxiii	6 April 1810
An Act to amend an Act made in the Twenty sixth Year of His present Majesty's Reign, (Note: Clyde Marine Society Act 1786 (26 Geo. 3. c. 109)) for incorporating and regulating the Clyde Marine Society. (Repealed by Statute Law (Repeals) Act 1981 (c. 19))
Doncaster to Salter's Brook Road Act 1810 (repealed)	50 Geo. 3. c. xxxiv	6 April 1810
An Act for continuing and amending Three Acts passed in the Fourteenth Year of His late Majesty, (Note: Doncaster to Salter's Brook Road Act 1740 (14 Geo. 2. c. 31)) and Second (Note: Doncaster to Salter's Brook Road Act 1762 (2 Geo. 3. c. 71)) and Twenty ninth (Note: Doncaster to Salter's Brook Road Act 1789 (29 Geo. 3. c. 98)) Years of His present Majesty, so far as they relate to repairing the Road from Doncaster in the County of York, to Salter's Brook in the County of Chester. (Repealed by Road from Doncaster to Salter's Brook Bridge Act 1826 (7 Geo. 4. c. cxxx))
Marchwiel to Whitchurch Road Act 1810 (repealed)	50 Geo. 3. c. xxxv	6 April 1810
An Act to continue the Term and amend and enlarge the Powers of Two Acts, of His present Majesty, for repairing the Road from Marchwiel, in the County of Denbigh, through Bangor, Worthenbury and Hanmer, in the County of Flint, to a certain House therein mentioned in the Parish of Whitchurch, in the County of Salop; and from Bangor aforesaid to Malpas, in the County of Chester; and from Redbrook to Hampton, in the County of Salop. (Repealed by Marchwiel and Whitchurch (Salop.), Bangor and Malpas, and Redbrook and Hampton Roads Act 1830 (1 Will. 4. c. ii))
Blackburn, Addingham and Cocking End Road Act 1810 (repealed)	50 Geo. 3. c. xxxvi	6 April 1810
An Act for more effectually repairing the Road from the Town of Blackburn through Padiham and Burnley to Colne, in the County Palatine of Lancaster; and for continuing the same Road through Glasburn and Silsden to Addingham and Cocking End, in the Wet Riding of the County of York. (Repealed by Road from Blackburn and from Old Accrington Act 1827 (7 & 8 Geo. 4. c. lix))
East Markham Inclosure Act 1810	50 Geo. 3. c. xxxvii	6 April 1810
An Act for inclosing Lands in the Parish of East Markham, in the County of Nottingham.
Brighthelmstone Improvement Act 1810 or the Brighton Improvement Act 1810 or the Brighton Commissioners Act 1810 or the Brighton Town Act 1810 (repealed)	50 Geo. 3. c. xxxviii	18 April 1810
An Act to repeal an Act made in the Thirteenth Year of His present Majesty, (Note: Brighton Streets Act 1772 (13 Geo. 3. c. 34)) for paving, lighting and cleansing the Town of Brighthelmstone, (Note: Brighthelmstone is now known as Brighton.) in the County of Sussex, and removing and preventing Nuisances and Annoyances therein; for regulating the Market; for building and repairing Groyns to render the Coast safe and commodious; for landing Coal and Culm, and laying a Duty thereon, and for making other Provisions in lieu thereof; and for regulating Weights and Measures, and building a Town Hall. (Repealed by Brighthelmston Improvement and Poor Relief Act 1825 (6 Geo. 4. c. clxxix))
City of Norwich (Foundry to Thorpe) Bridge Act 1810 (repealed)	50 Geo. 3. c. xxxix	18 April 1810
An Act for building a Bridge over the River Wensum, in the City of Norwich, to the Hamlet of Thorpe, in the County of the said City. (Repealed by Norwich City Council Act 1984 (c. xxiii))
Pontefract Improvement Act 1810 (repealed)	50 Geo. 3. c. xl	18 April 1810
An Act for paving and otherwise improving the Streets and other Publick Passages within the Town of Pontefract, in the County of York, for better supplying the said Town with Water, and for altering and amending an Act, passed in the Twentieth Year of His present Majesty, intituled, "An Act for dividing the Park of Pontefract, in the County of York, and for other Purposes therein mentioned." (Note: Pontefract Park Dividing Act 1780 (20 Geo. 3. c. 55 Pr.)) (Repealed by West Yorkshire Act 1980 (c. xiv))
Kingston-upon-Hull Improvement Act 1810 (repealed)	50 Geo. 3. c. xli	18 April 1810
An Act for watching, and more effectually lighting, cleansing and other wife improving the Town of Kingston upon Hull, and the Liberty of Trippett and the Lordship or Precinct of Myton, in the Parish of the Holy Trinity, in the said Town; and for preventing Nuisances therein; and also for preventing Frauds and Impositions in the Quality, Measure and Carriage of Coals sold in the said Town and the Neighbourhood thereof. (Repealed by Kingston-upon-Hull Improvement Act 1854 (17 & 18 Vict. c. ci))
Lowestoft Improvement Act 1810 (repealed)	50 Geo. 3. c. xlii	18 April 1810
An Act for better paving, lighting, cleansing, watching and otherwise improving the Town of Lowestoft, in the County of Suffolk. (Repealed by Lowestoft Improvement Act 1854 (17 & 18 Vict. c. clxi))
St. Luke, Chelsea, Burial Ground Act 1810 (repealed)	50 Geo. 3. c. xliii	18 April 1810
An Act for providing an Additional Burial Ground for the Parish of Saint Luke, Chelsea, in the County of Middlesex. (Repealed by London Government (Borough of Southwark) Order in Council 1901 (SR&O 1901/275))
Paddington Church Yard Act 1810	50 Geo. 3. c. xliv	18 April 1810
An Act for further enlarging the Church Yard of the Parish of Paddington in the County of Middlesex.
St. George the Martyr, Southwark, Parochial Rates Act 1810 (repealed)	50 Geo. 3. c. xlv	18 April 1810
An Act for better affecting and collecting the Poor and other Rates in the Parish of Saint George the Martyr, in the Borough of Southwark, in the County of Surrey, and regulating the Poor thereof. (Repealed by London Government (Borough of Southwark) Order in Council 1901 (SR&O 1901/275))
Barrier Bank (Upper End), Isle of Ely, Improvement Act 1810 (repealed)	50 Geo. 3. c. xlvi	18 April 1810
An Act for improving the Upper End of the Barrier Bank, on the North Side of the Wash of the Hundred Foot River, in the Isle of Ely, and Counties of Cambridge and Huntingdon. (Repealed by Middle Level Act 1862 (25 & 26 Vict. c. clxxxviii))
Barrier Bank (Lower End), Isle of Ely, Improvement Act 1810 (repealed)	50 Geo. 3. c. xlvii	18 April 1810
An Act for improving the Lower End of the Barrier Bank, between Salter's Lode and Welche's Dam Bridge, in the Isle of Ely, and Counties of Cambridge and Norfolk. (Repealed by Middle Level Act 1862 (25 & 26 Vict. c. clxxxviii))
Rumney and Roath Bridge Act 1810 (repealed)	50 Geo. 3. c. xlviii	18 April 1810
An Act for altering, amending and enlarging the Powers of an Act, passed in the Forty fifth Year of His present Majesty, (Note: Rumney Bridge Act 1805 (45 Geo. 3. c. lxxiii)) for building a Bridge over that Part of the River Rumney which divides the Parish of Rumney in the County of Monmouth, and the Parish of Roath in the County of Glamorgan. (Repealed by Turnpike Trusts in South Wales Act 1844 (7 & 8 Vict. c. 91))
North Shields to Newcastle Road Act 1810 (repealed)	50 Geo. 3. c. xlix	18 April 1810
An Act to continue and amend Three Acts passed in the Twenty second Year of His late Majesty, (Note: North Shields to Newcastle Road Act 1748 (22 Geo. 2. c. 9)) and the Fourteenth (Note: North Shields to Newcastle Road Act 1774 (14 Geo. 3. c. 115)) and Thirty sixth (Note: North Shields to Newcastle Road Act 1796 (36 Geo. 3. c. 130)) Years of His present Majesty, for repairing the Road from North Shields, in the County of Northumberland, to the Town of Newcastle upon Tyne, and to make and repair certain additional Branches of Road communicating therewith. (Repealed by Road from North Shields to Newcastle-upon-Tyne Act 1831 (1 & 2 Will. 4. c. lxxii))
Montrose Bridge Act 1810	50 Geo. 3. c. l	18 April 1810
An Act to amend an Act passed in the Thirty second Year of His present Majesty, (Note: Montrose Bridge Act 1792 (32 Geo. 3. c. 38)) for building a Bridge over the River South Esk, at or near Montrose.
Royal Institution of Great Britain Act 1810	50 Geo. 3. c. li	18 April 1810
An Act for enlarging the Powers granted by His Majesty to the Royal Institution of Great Britain, and for extending and more effectually promoting the Objects thereof.
Roads in Carnarvon and Denbigh Act 1810 (repealed)	50 Geo. 3. c. lii	18 April 1810
An Act to continue the Term and alter and enlarge the Powers of several Acts of His present Majesty, for repairing certain Roads in the Counties of Carnarvon and Denbigh, and for more effectually repairing, improving and keeping in Repair certain other Roads in the County of Carnarvon. (Repealed by Conway and Pwllheli Road Act 1832 (2 & 3 Will. 4. c. lx))
Road from High Road between Bromley and Farnborough to Road from Tunbridge Wells to Maresfield Act 1810 (repealed)	50 Geo. 3. c. liii	18 April 1810
An Act to continue the Terms and enlarge the Powers of Two Acts of the Seventh (Note: Kent and Sussex Roads (No. 2) Act 1766 (7 Geo. 3. c. 86)) and Twenty ninth (Note: Kent and Sussex Roads Act 1789 (29 Geo. 3. c. 85)) Years of His present Majesty, for repairing the Road leading from the High Road between Bromley and Farnborough, in the County of Kent, to Beggars' Bush in the Turnpike Road leading from Tonbridge Wells to Maresfield, in the County of Sussex. (Repealed by Road from High Road between Bromley and Farnborough to Road from Tunbridge Wells to Maresfield Act 1831 (1 Will. 4. c. xlv))
Lemsford Mill, Welwyn and Hitchin Roads Act 1810 (repealed)	50 Geo. 3. c. liv	18 April 1810
An Act for continuing and amending Two Acts passed in the Third and Twenty fourth Years of His present Majesty, for repairing the Roads from Lemsford Mill, through Welwyn and Stevenage to Hitchin, and from Welwyn through Codicot to Hitchin aforesaid, all in the County of Hertford. (Repealed by Bishop's Hatfield and Hitchin, and Welwyn and Hitchin Roads Act 1831 (1 Will. 4. c. xxxvi))
Pulborough and Steyning Road Act 1810 (repealed)	50 Geo. 3. c. lv	18 April 1810
An Act for making and keeping in Repair the Road leading from a Place near Stopham Bridge, in the Parish of Pulborough, in the County of Sussex, to the Road running from Worthing to Horsham, in the said County; and from the said Road running from Worthing to Horsham to the Direction Post in the Parish of Steyning, on the Turnpike Road leading from Steyning to Horsham, in the said County. (Repealed by Stopham Bridge and Steyning Turnpike Road (Sussex) Act 1831 (1 Will. 4. c. xxxiii))
Roads in Stafford and Salop Act 1810 (repealed)	50 Geo. 3. c. lvi	18 April 1810
An Act for enlarging the Term and Powers of Two Acts of His present Majesty, (Note: Wolverhampton Roads Act 1772 (12 Geo. 3. c. 101)) (Note: Wolverhampton Roads Act 1793 (33 Geo. 3. c. 147)) for repairing the Road from Gibbet Lane to Wolverhampton, in the County of Stafford, and several other Roads therein described; and for extending the said Roads from King's Wood Common to the Turnpike Road leading from Weston under Lizard to Newport, in the County of Salop. (Repealed by Wolverhampton Roads in Stafford and Salop Act 1831 (1 & 2 Will. 4. c. xxv))
Road from Liverpool to Preston Act 1810 (repealed)	50 Geo. 3. c. lvii	18 April 1810
An Act for more effectually repairing, widening, improving and amending the Road from Liverpool to Preston, in the County Palatine of Lancaster. (Repealed by Road from Liverpool to Preston Act 1831 (1 Will. 4. c. xxxiv))
Abergavenny Roads Act 1810 (repealed)	50 Geo. 3. c. lviii	18 April 1810
An Act for more effectually repairing and keeping in Repair several Roads leading to and from the Town of Abergavenny in the County of Monmouth. (Repealed by Abergavenny Roads Act 1831 (1 & 2 Will. 4. c. xxvi))
Road from Rotherham to Clown and Worksop Act 1810 (repealed)	50 Geo. 3. c. lix	18 April 1810
An Act for making and keeping in Repair a Carriage Road from the Turnpike Road leading from Rotherham in the County of York, to Mansfield in the County of Nottingham, at or near Clown in the County of Derby, to the Turnpike Road leading from Worksop to Kellam, at or near Budby in the County of Nottingham. (Repealed by Road from Clown to Worksop Act 1831 (1 Will. 4. c. xiii))
Rathdown Roads Act 1810 (repealed)	50 Geo. 3. c. lx	18 April 1810
An Act to amend so much of an Act made in the Parliament of Ireland, in the Twenty sixth Year of His present Majesty, (Note: County Dublin Roads Act 1786 (26 Geo. 3. c. 14 (I))) for making and repairing Publick Roads in the County of Dublin, as relates to the Roads within the Barony of Rathdown. (Repealed by County Dublin Grand Jury Act 1844 (7 & 8 Vict. c. 106))
Durham and Berwick-upon-Tweed Roads Act 1810 (repealed)	50 Geo. 3. c. lxi	18 April 1810
An Act for amending an Act of the Forty second Year of His present Majesty (Note: Berwick and Durham Roads and Tweed Bridges Act 1802 (42 Geo. 3. c. cxvii)) for repairing the Road from Buckton Burn through Berwick upon Tweed to Lammerton Hill, and several other Roads therein mentioned, in the County of Durham and Liberties of Berwick upon Tweed. (Repealed by Durham and Berwick Roads and Bridges Act 1819 (59 Geo. 3. c. lviii))
Roads to and through Frome Act 1810 (repealed)	50 Geo. 3. c. lxii	18 April 1810
An Act to amend several Acts for repairing Roads leading to and through the Town of Frome in the County of Somerset, and for paving the Footways and lighting the Streets within the said Town, and for removing Part of the present Market Place in the said Town. (Repealed by Roads to and through Frome Act 1831 (1 & 2 Will. 4. c. lxvi))
Roads from Hardingston to Old Stratford Act 1810 (repealed)	50 Geo. 3. c. lxiii	18 April 1810
An Act for more effectually repairing the Road from Hardingstone to Old Stratford, in the County of Northampton. (Repealed by Road from Hardingston to Old Stratford (Northamptonshire) Act 1832 (2 & 3 Will. 4. c. iv))
Eling and Fawley Inclosures Act 1810	50 Geo. 3. c. lxiv	18 April 1810
An Act for inclosing Lands in the Parishes of Eling and Fawley, in the County of Southampton.
Earl of Essex' Marriage Settlement Act 1810	50 Geo. 3. c. lxv	18 April 1810
An Act for appointing new Trustees for carrying into Execution the Trusts and Powers of the Settlement made on the Marriage of the Right Honourable George Capel Coningesby Earl of Essex, with Sarah Countess of Essex, his Wife.
Bletchley Inclosure Act 1810	50 Geo. 3. c. lxvi	18 April 1810
An Act for inclosing and exonerating from Tythes, Lands in the Parish of Bletchley, in the County of Buckingham.
Great Plumstead and Postwick Inclosures Act 1810	50 Geo. 3. c. lxvii	18 April 1810
An Act for inclosing Lands in the Parishes of Great Plumstead and Postwick, in the County of Norfolk.
Kilmarnock Improvement, Markets and Police Act 1810 (repealed)	50 Geo. 3. c. lxviii	18 May 1810
An Act for paving, lighting, cleansing and watching the Burgh of Kilmarnock, and Suburbs thereof; for regulating the Police and Markets; and for other Purposes therein mentioned. (Repealed by Kilmarnock Police and Improvement Act 1847 (10 & 11 Vict. c. ccvii))
Statute Labour in Stirling Act 1810	50 Geo. 3. c. lxix	18 May 1810
An Act for better regulating the Statute Labour within the County of Stirling.
Aberdeen Harbour Act 1810 (repealed)	50 Geo. 3. c. lxx	18 May 1810
An Act to amend several Acts of the Thirteenth, (Note: Aberdeen Harbour Act 1772 (13 Geo. 3. c. 29)) Thirty fifth (Note: Aberdeen Harbour Act 1795 (35 Geo. 3. c. 41)) and Thirty seventh (Note: Aberdeen Harbour Act 1797 (37 Geo. 3. c. 101)) Years of His present Majesty, for deepening and making more commodious the Harbour of Aberdeen. (Repealed by Aberdeen Harbour Act 1829 (10 Geo. 4. c. xxxiv))
St. John, Hampstead, Burial Ground Act 1810	50 Geo. 3. c. lxxi	18 May 1810
An Act for providing an additional Burying Ground for the Parish of Saint John, Hampstead, in the County of Middlesex.
Fife, Kinross, Perth and Clackmannan Roads Act 1810 (repealed)	50 Geo. 3. c. lxxii	18 May 1810
An Act for more effectually making and repairing certain Roads in the Counties of Fife, Kinross, Perth and Clackmannan. (Repealed by Fife, Kinross, Perth and Clackmannan Roads Act 1831 (1 & 2 Will. 4. c. lxxi))
Hereford Roads Act 1810 (repealed)	50 Geo. 3. c. lxxiii	18 May 1810
An Act for more effectually repairing the Roads leading into the City of Hereford, and several Roads communicating therewith. (Repealed by Hereford Roads Act 1835 (5 & 6 Will. 4. c. xxii))
Wisbech and Thorney Road Act 1810 (repealed)	50 Geo. 3. c. lxxiv	18 May 1810
An Act for making and maintaining a Turnpike Road from the Town of Wisbech in the Isle of Ely, in the County of Cambridge, to the Town of Thorney in the same Isle and County. (Repealed by Wisbech and Thorney Road Act 1831 (1 & 2 Will. 4. c. xliii))
Johns' Patent Tessera Act 1810 (repealed)	50 Geo. 3. c. lxxv	18 May 1810
An Act to amend an Act of the Fourteenth Year of His present Majesty, for the better Regulation of Buildings and Party Walls, and for the more effectually preventing Mischiefs by Fire within the Cities of London and Westminster, by permitting Johns' Patent Tessera to be used in the Covering of Houses and Buildings within the Places therein mentioned. (Repealed by Metropolitan Buildings Act 1844 (7 & 8 Vict. c. 84))
Thames and Medway Canal Act 1810	50 Geo. 3. c. lxxvi	18 May 1810
An Act for enabling the Company of Proprietors of the Thames and Medway Canal to vary the Line of the said Canal; and for altering and enlarging the Powers of Two Acts passed in the Fortieth (Note: Thames and Medway Canal Act 1800 (39 & 40 Geo. 3. c. xxiii)) and Forty fourth (Note: Thames and Medway Canal Act 1804 (44 Geo. 3. c. xlvi)) Years of His present Majesty, for making the said Canal and a Collateral Cut thereto.
Moreton's Leam Barrier Bank Improvement Act 1810 (repealed)	50 Geo. 3. c. lxxvii	18 May 1810
An Act for improving the Barrier Bank on the South Side of Moreton's Leam, between Tower House and Whittlesey Field, in the Isle of Ely and County of Cambridge. (Repealed by Middle Level Act 1862 (25 & 26 Vict. c. clxxxviii))
March, Wimblington and Upwell Drainage and Inclosure Act 1810	50 Geo. 3. c. lxxviii	18 May 1810
An Act to amend and render more effectual Two Acts of His late and present Majesty for draining, preserving, and inclosing Lands in March, Wimblington and Upwell, in the Isle of Ely and County of Cambridge, so far as the said Acts relate to the First and Second Districts therein mentioned.
North Weston, Walton, Clapton Wick, Weston in Gordano, Clapton, Portishead and Portbury Drainage Act 1810	50 Geo. 3. c. lxxix	18 May 1810
An Act for draining and improving certain Lands in the Manors, Parishes and Places of North Weston, Walton and other Places in the County of Somerset.
Stilton Drainage Act 1810	50 Geo. 3. c. lxxx	18 May 1810
An Act for draining and improving certain Fen Lands and Low Grounds in the Parish of Stilton, in the County of Huntingdon.
Minsmere Level Drainage Act 1810	50 Geo. 3. c. lxxxi	18 May 1810
An Act for embanking and draining a certain Level of Marshes and Fen Lands called or known by the Name of The Minsmere Level, within the several Parishes of Leiston with the Hamlet of Sizewell, Theberton, Dunwich, Westleton and Middleton cum Fordley, in the County of Suffolk.
Bedford Improvement and Bridge over River Ouse Act 1810 (repealed)	50 Geo. 3. c. lxxxii	18 May 1810
An Act for amending and enlarging the Powers of an Act of His present Majesty, intituled, "An Act for the Improvement of the Town of Bedford in the County of Bedford, and for rebuilding the Bridge over the River Ouze in the said Town." (Note: Bedford Improvement and Ouse Bridge Act 1803 (43 Geo. 3. c. cxxviii)) (Repealed by Statute Law (Repeals) Act 1995 (c. 44))
Ratcliff Improvement and Poor Relief Act 1810 (repealed)	50 Geo. 3. c. lxxxiii	18 May 1810
An Act for better lighting, watching, cleansing and repairing the Highways, and otherwise improving the Hamlet of Ratcliff, in the County of Middlesex, and for repealing an Act of the Twenty ninth Year of His late Majesty (Note: Tower of London Act 1756 (29 Geo. 2. c. 87)) relative thereto; and for the better Relief and Ibid Maintenance of the Poor of the said Hamlet. (Repealed by London Government (Borough of Stepney) Order in Council 1901 (SR&O 1901/276))
Rolls Liberty Improvement Act 1810 (repealed)	50 Geo. 3. c. lxxxiv	18 May 1810
An Act for better paving and lighting, for establishing a Nightly Watch, for regulating the Poor, and recovering the Poor Rates within the Liberty of the Rolls in the County of Middlesex. (Repealed by London Government (City of Westminster) Order in Council 1901 (SR&O 1901/278))
Devon County Gaol Act 1810 (repealed)	50 Geo. 3. c. lxxxv	18 May 1810
An Act to explain and amend an Act of the Twenty seventh Year of His present Majesty, (Note: Devon Gaol Act 1787 (27 Geo. 3. c. 59)) for making and declaring the Gaol for the County of Devon a Publick and Common Gaol; and for other Purposes in the said Act mentioned. (Repealed by Statute Law (Repeals) Act 2008 (c. 12))
York, Ouse and Foss Bridges Act 1810 (repealed)	50 Geo. 3. c. lxxxvi	18 May 1810
An Act for altering and amending an Act passed in the last Session of Parliament, (Note: York Ouse and Foss Bridges Act 1809 (49 Geo. 3. c. cxxvi)) for widening and altering Ouse Bridge over the River Ouse, and Foss Bridge over the River Foss, in the City of York; for widening, raising and improving certain Streets, Lanes and Passages leading and near to the said Bridges; and for making certain other Improvements in the said City. (Repealed by York Corporation Act 1969 (c. xxxviii))
Lovat Bridge (Inverness) Act 1810	50 Geo. 3. c. lxxxvii	18 May 1810
An Act for maintaining a Bridge across the River Beauley, to be called The Lovat Bridge, in the County of Inverness.
St. Mary Islington Road Act 1810 (repealed)	50 Geo. 3. c. lxxxviii	18 May 1810
An Act for making and maintaining a Road partly by an Archway through the East Side of Highgate Hill, communicating with the present Turnpike Road from London to Barnet, at Upper Holloway, in the Parish of Saint Mary Islington, and near the Brook below the Fifth Mile Stone, in the Parish of Hornsey, in the County of Middlesex. (Repealed by Highgate Archway Act 1884 (47 & 48 Vict. c. xxi))
Birmingham Life Assurance and Annuity Office Act 1810	50 Geo. 3. c. lxxxix	18 May 1810
An Act to enable the Birmingham Life Assurance and Annuity Office to sue in the Name of their Secretary, and to inrol Annuities.
Birmingham Fire Office Company Act 1810	50 Geo. 3. c. xc	18 May 1810
An Act to enable the Birmingham Fire Office Company to sue in the Name of their Secretary.
Newcastle-upon-Tyne Coal Loading Regulation Act 1810	50 Geo. 3. c. xci	18 May 1810
An Act to regulate the loading of Ships with Coals in the Port of Newcastle upon Tyne.
Doncaster, Wakefield, Weeland and Wentbridge Roads Act 1810 (repealed)	50 Geo. 3. c. xcii	18 May 1810
An Act for continuing the Term and altering and enlarging the Powers of several Acts for repairing the Roads therein mentioned, so far as the same relate to the Road from the Red House, near Doncaster, to the South End of Wakefield Bridge, and from Wakefield to Pontefract, and from thence to Weeland, and from Pontefract to Wentbridge, all in the West Riding of the County of York. (Repealed by Doncaster, Wakefield, Weeland and Wentbridge Roads Act 1831 (1 Will. 4. c. xliv))
Warwick and Northampton Road Act 1810 (repealed)	50 Geo. 3. c. xciii	18 May 1810
An Act to continue the Term, and alter and enlarge the Powers of Two Acts, passed in the Fifth (Note: Warwick and Northampton Road Act 1765 (5 Geo. 3. c. 107)) and Sixteenth (Note: Warwick and Northampton Road Act 1776 (16 Geo. 3. c. 80)) Years of His present Majesty, for repairing the Road from the Great Bridge (Note: Old Castle Bridge, Warwick; it was destroyed by floods in 1795. 52°16′45″N 1°35′00″W) in the Borough of Warwick to the Town of Northampton. (Repealed by Warwick and Northampton Road Act 1832 (2 & 3 Will. 4. c. xcviii))
Aylesbury and Hockliffe Road Act 1810 (repealed)	50 Geo. 3. c. xciv	18 May 1810
An Act for more effectually amending, widening and repairing the Road leading from Aylesbury, in the County of Buckingham, to Hockliffe, in the County of Bedford. (Repealed by Aylesbury and Hockliffe Road Act 1831 (1 & 2 Will. 4. c. lxiii))
Birmingham, Warmington and Edgehill Roads Act 1810	50 Geo. 3. c. xcv	18 May 1810
An Act to continue the Term and alter and enlarge the Powers of several Acts for repairing the Roads from Birmingham to Warmington, and from Birmingham to Edgehill, in the County of Warwick, so far as the same relate to the Road from Birmingham to Warmington, and so on to the utmost Limits of the said County on Edgehill.
Huddersfield, Woodhead and Entercleugh Bridge Road Act 1810 (repealed)	50 Geo. 3. c. xcvi	18 May 1810
An Act for continuing the Term and enlarging the Powers of Two Acts of the Eighth (Note: Yorks and Derby Roads Act 1768 (8 Geo. 3. c. 47)) and Twenty eighth (Note: Huddersfield Roads Act 1788 (28 Geo. 3. c. 103)) Years of His present Majesty, so far as the same relate to the Road from the Township of Huddersfield, in the West Riding of the County of York, to Woodhead, in the County Palatine of Chester, and from thence to a Bridge over the River Mersey, called Enterclough Bridge, on the Confines of the County of Derby. (Repealed by Huddersfield, Woodhead and Derby Road Act 1831 (1 & 2 Will. 4. c. xl))
Monmouth Roads Act 1810	50 Geo. 3. c. xcvii	18 May 1810
An Act for enlarging the Term and Powers of Three Acts of His late and present Majesty, (Note: Monmouth Roads Act 1755 (28 Geo. 2. c. 31)) (Note: Monmouth Roads Act 1777 (17 Geo. 3. c. 96)) (Note: Monmouth Roads Act 1793 (33 Geo. 3. c. 169)) for repairing several Roads therein mentioned, leading to, through and from the Town of Monmouth, and for making a New Piece of Road to communicate therewith.
Staplebar, Willey's Oak, Kingsham and Walford Roads Act 1810	50 Geo. 3. c. xcviii	18 May 1810
An Act for continuing and amending an Act of the Twenty eighth Year of His present Majesty, (Note: Radnor Roads Act 1788 (28 Geo. 3. c. 105)) for repairing the Roads from Staplebar to Lingen, and from thence to Willey's Oak, and from Kingsham to the Kington and Radnor Turnpike Roads, and from Lingen aforesaid to Walford, in the County of Hereford.
Wendover and Buckingham Road Act 1810 (repealed)	50 Geo. 3. c. xcix	18 May 1810
An Act for more effectually repairing and improving the Road from Wendover to the Town of Buckingham, in the County of Buckingham. (Repealed by Wendover and Buckingham Road Act 1830 (11 Geo. 4 & 1 Will. 4. c. lxxxi))
Road from Bolton-Le-Moors to Blackburn Act 1810 (repealed)	50 Geo. 3. c. c	18 May 1810
An Act to continue the Term, and alter and enlarge the Powers of an Act of the Thirty seventh Year of His present Majesty, (Note: Bolton Blackburn and Twisey Roads Act 1797 (37 Geo. 3. c. 173)) for amending the Road from Bolton in the Moors to Blackburn, in the County Palatine of Lancaster; and for making a Branch of Road from the said Road to the Road leading from Blackburn to Preston and another Branch of Road from Mather Fold to Hardman's, both in Turton in the said County. (Repealed by Road from Bolton-le-Moors to Blackburn Act 1830 (11 Geo. 4 & 1 Will. 4. c. xxx))
Bruton Roads Act 1810 (repealed)	50 Geo. 3. c. ci	18 May 1810
An Act to continue and amend an Act of the Thirty third Year of His present Majesty, (Note: Wiltshire and Somerset Roads Act 1793 (33 Geo. 3. c. 155)) for repairing several Roads in and near the Town of Brewton, and other Roads in the Counties of Somerset and Wilts, therein described. (Repealed by Bruton (or Brewton) Roads Act 1831 (1 Will. 4. c. lxvi))
Road from Mansfield to the Nottingham Turnpike Road, and from Woolley Moor to the Chesterfield Turnpike Road Act 1810 (repealed)	50 Geo. 3. c. cii	18 May 1810
An Act to continue the Term and alter and enlarge the Powers of Two Acts of His present Majesty, (Note: Notts and Derby Roads Act 1765 (5 Geo. 3. c. 90)) (Note: Nottinghamshire and Derby Roads Act 1788 (28 Geo. 3. c. 87)) for repairing the Road from the Alfreton Turnpike Road, near a Place called Little Robins, in the Parish of Mansfield, in the County of Nottingham, to the Nottingham Turnpike Road near Tansley, in the County of Derby, and from Woolley Moor to the Chesterfield Turnpike Road at Kelslidge, in the said County of Derby. (Repealed by Road from Mansfield to the Nottingham Turnpike Road Act 1832 (2 & 3 Will. 4. c. xxxii))
Roads from Blyth Marsh and from Cheadle Act 1810 (repealed)	50 Geo. 3. c. ciii	18 May 1810
An Act to continue the Term and alter and enlarge the Powers of Three Acts, passed in the Second, (Note: Stafford, Chester and Derby Roads Act 1762 (2 Geo. 3. c. 62)) Eleventh (Note: Staffordshire Roads (No. 2) Act 1771 (11 Geo. 3. c. 87)) and Twenty second (Note: Stafford and Derby Roads Act 1782 (22 Geo. 3. c. 116)) Years of His present Majesty, for repairing the Road leading from Blyth Marsh, in the County of Stafford, to the Road from Ashborn to Buxton, near Thorp in the County of Derby, and from the Road between Cheadle and Leek, to the Road above Frogall Bridge, and from the same Road to the said Road between Blyth Marsh and Thorp at or near Ruchill Gate, in the County of Stafford. (Repealed by Roads in the Neighbourhood of Cheadle Act 1831 (1 Will. 4. c. lxviii))
Cheadle to Butterton Moor Road Act 1810 (repealed)	50 Geo. 3. c. civ	18 May 1810
An Act to continue the Term and alter and enlarge the Powers of Two Acts, passed in the Ninth (Note: Cheadle to Butterton Moor Road Act 1769 (9 Geo. 3. c. 80)) and Thirtieth (Note: Cheadle to Butterton Moor Road Act 1790 (30 Geo. 3. c. 107)) Years of His present Majesty, for repairing the Road from Cheadle (Note: Cheadle, Staffordshire.) to Botham House, (Note: Bottomhouse, Staffordshire. 53°04′19″N 1°56′23″W) and from thence to Butterton Moor End, (Note: Near Butterton, Staffordshire.) in the County of Stafford. (Repealed by Roads in the Neighbourhood of Cheadle Act 1831 (1 Will. 4. c. lxviii))
Earl of Coventry's Estate (Timber Felling) Act 1810	50 Geo. 3. c. cv	18 May 1810
An Act for enabling the Trustees of George Earl of Coventry, to cut down and fell Timber on the Estates devised to him for Life by the Will of his late Father, deceased.
Lord Penrhyn's Estate Act 1810	50 Geo. 3. c. cvi	18 May 1810
An Act for vesting the legal Fee of certain Estates devised by the Will of the Right Honourable Richard late Lord Penrhyn, and now vested in William Norris Esquire, in William Le Blanc and his Heirs, upon the Trusts subsisting or capable of taking Effect in the said Estates.
Boddington's Estate Act 1810	50 Geo. 3. c. cvii	18 May 1810
An Act for vesting certain Trust Estates in the surviving Trustee under the Will of Elizabeth Boddington, deceased.
Kilkenny City Asylum Act 1810 (repealed)	50 Geo. 3. c. cviii	18 May 1810
An Act for incorporating the Archbishop of Cashel, the Bishop of Leighlin and Ferns, the Bishop of Offory, and the Dean of Offory, and their respective Successors for the time being, into a Corporation, to be called by the Name of 'The Trustees of the Asylum in the City of Kilkenny,' founded by James Switfir Esquire, and for enabling them to carry on that charitable and useful Institution, according to the Provifions of a certain Trust Deed, executed by the said James Switfir. (Repealed by Statute Law (Repeals) Act 2013 (c. 2))
Sparling's Estate Act 1810	50 Geo. 3. c. cix	18 May 1810
An Act for vesting a Messuage and Premises near Liverpool, in the County of Lancaster, devised by the Will of John Sparling Esquire deceased, in Trustees in trust to sell the same, and to lay out the Monies thence arising in the Purchase of other Estates.
Rossington Inclosures and Exchange Act 1810	50 Geo. 3. c. cx	18 May 1810
An Act to confirm and establish certain Inclosures of Lands, within the Parish of Rossington, in the West Riding of the County of York; and also to effectuate an Exchange, lately made between the Mayor, Aldermen and Burgesses of the Borough of Doncaster, and the Rector of Rossington aforesaid.
Newton Blossomville Inclosure Act 1810	50 Geo. 3. c. cxi	18 May 1810
An Act for inclosing Lands in the Parish of Newnton Blossomville otherwise Newton Blossomville, in the County of Buckingham.
Telscombe Inclosure Act 1810	50 Geo. 3. c. cxii	18 May 1810
An Act for allotting Lands in the Parish of Tellescomb otherwise Telscombe, in the County of Sussex
Tidenham, Woolastone and Lancaut Inclosures Act 1810	50 Geo. 3. c. cxiii	18 May 1810
An Act for inclosing Lands in the Parishes of Tidenham, Woolastone and Lancaut, in the County of Gloucester.
Berrick Prior Inclosure Act 1810	50 Geo. 3. c. cxiv	18 May 1810
An Act for inclosing Lands in the Liberty of Berrick Prior, and in the Manor and Parish of Newington, in the County of Oxford.
Codicote, Welwyn and Knebworth Inclosures Act 1810	50 Geo. 3. c. cxv	18 May 1810
An Act for inclosing Lands in the Parishes of Codicote, Welwyn and Knebworth, in the County of Hertford.
Gladestry and Colva Inclosures Act 1810	50 Geo. 3. c. cxvi	18 May 1810
An Act for inclosing Lands in the Parishes of Gladestry and Colva, in the County of Radnor.
Newbold Verdon and Newbold Heath Inclosures Act 1810	50 Geo. 3. c. cxvii	18 May 1810
An Act for inclosing the Open Fields of Newbold Verdon and Newbold Heath, in the County of Leicester.
Enborne, Hamstead Marshall, Inkpen and Kintbury Inclosures Act 1810	50 Geo. 3. c. cxviii	18 May 1810
An Act for inclosing Lands in the Parishes of Enborne, Hamstead Marshall, Inkpen and Kintbury, in the County of Berks.
Loes and Wilford Poor Relief Act 1810 (repealed)	50 Geo. 3. c. cxix	24 May 1810
An Act for amending an Act passed in the Thirty first Year of His present Majesty, (Note: Loes and Wilford, Suffolk Poor Relief Act 1791 (31 Geo. 3. c. 72)) for the better Relief and Employment of the Poor within the Hundreds of Loes and Wilford, in the County of Suffolk. (Repealed by Loes and Wilford Poor Relief Act 1826 (7 Geo. 4. c. i))
Statute Labour in Forfar (County) Act 1810	50 Geo. 3. c. cxx	24 May 1810
An Act for better regulating the Statute Labour in the County of Forfar.
Roads in Forfar (County) Act 1810	50 Geo. 3. c. cxxi	24 May 1810
An Act for more effectually repairing the Roads in County of Forfar.
Grand Union Canal (Old) Act 1810	50 Geo. 3. c. cxxii	24 May 1810
An Act for making and maintaining a Navigable Canal from the Union Canal, in the Parish of Gumley, in the County of Leicester, to join the Grand Junction Canal near Long Buckby, in the County of Northampton; and for making a Collateral Cut from the said intended Canal.
Monmouth Railway Act 1810	50 Geo. 3. c. cxxiii	24 May 1810
An Act for making and maintaining a Railway from Howler Slade in the Forest of Dean, in the County of Gloucester, to the Town of Monmouth; and for making other Railways therein mentioning in the Counties of Gloucester and Monmouth.
Severn Tunnel Act 1810	50 Geo. 3. c. cxxiv	24 May 1810
An Act for making and maintaining a Tunnel or Road under the River Severn, from the Parish of Newnham to the Parish of Arlingham, in the County of Gloucester.
Bedford Level (Middle Level) Drainage Act 1810 or the Middle Level Act 1810	50 Geo. 3. c. cxxv	24 May 1810
An Act for improving the Drainage of certain Lands within the North and South West Parts of the Middle Level, Part of the Great Level of the Fens commonly called Bedford Level.
Leverton Inclosure and Sea Bank Act 1810	50 Geo. 3. c. cxxvi	24 May 1810
An Act for inclosing Lands in the Parish of Leverton, in the County of Lincoln; and for providing for the Repair of a certain Sea Bank within the said Parish.
Leake Inclosure and Sea Bank Act 1810	50 Geo. 3. c. cxxvii	24 May 1810
An Act for inclosing Lands in the Parish of Leake, in the County of Lincoln; and for providing for the Repair of the New Sea Bank within the said Parish.
Cawdle Fen Drainage Act 1810	50 Geo. 3. c. cxxviii	24 May 1810
An Act for amending, enlarging and rendering more effectual an Act passed in the Eleventh Year of King George the Second, (Note: Cawdle Fen, etc., Drainage Act 1737 (11 Geo. 2. c. 34)) for the effectual draining and preserving of a certain Fen called Cawdle Fen, and other Fen Grounds in the Isle of Ely, in the County of Cambridge.
East and West Fens Allotments and Inclosures Act 1810	50 Geo. 3. c. cxxix	24 May 1810
An Act for amending and rendering more effectual an Act of His present Majesty, for dividing and allotting certain Fens, called The East and West Fens, in the County of Lincoln; and for dividing and inclosing the Parochial Allotments, Lands and Grounds belonging to and in certain Parishes having Right of Common on the said Fens, and for declaring to what Parishes such Allotments shall be long.
Christchurch, Birmingham Act 1810 (repealed)	50 Geo. 3. c. cxxx	24 May 1810
An Act to amend and render more effectual an Act of His present Majesty, (Note: Christchurch, Birmingham Act 1803 (43 Geo. 3. c. cxvii)) for erecting a new Church to be called Christchurch, in the Town of Birmingham in the County of Warwick; and for providing a Maintenance and Residence for the Minister or perpetual Curate thereof. (Repealed by Birmingham Churches Act 1897 (60 & 61 Vict. c. ccxi))
Mile End Old Town Poor Rates and Workhouse Act 1810 (repealed)	50 Geo. 3. c. cxxxi	24 May 1810
An Act for the more equally assessing and collecting the Poor Rates within the Hamlet of Mile End Old Town in the Parish of Saint Dunstan Stebon Heath otherwise Stepney, in the County of Middlesex, to alter, enlarge or repair a Workhouse or Workhouses of the said Hamlet, and managing the Concerns thereof. (Repealed by London Government (Borough of Stepney) Order in Council 1901 (SR&O 1901/276))
West Middlesex Waterworks Act 1810	50 Geo. 3. c. cxxxii	24 May 1810
An Act to enable the Company of Proprietors of the West Middlesex Waterworks to raise a further Sum of Money; and to alter, vary, amend and enlarge the Powers of the Act passed in the Forty sixth Year of His present Majesty, (Note: West Middlesex Waterworks Act 1806 (46 Geo. 3. c. cxix)) for making the said Waterworks; and for extending the same.
Road from Buckingham to Daventry Turnpike Road Act 1810 (repealed)	50 Geo. 3. c. cxxxiii	24 May 1810
An Act for enlarging the Term and Powers of an Act of His present Majesty, (Note: Buckingham to Banbury Road Act 1791 (31 Geo. 3. c. 133)) for repairing the Road from Buckingham, through Brackley, to join the Daventry Turnpike Road near Banbury. (Repealed by Brackley Turnpike Roads Consolidation Act 1851 (14 & 15 Vict. c. lxi))
Kinnegad and Athlone Turnpike Road Act 1810 (repealed)	50 Geo. 3. c. cxxxiv	24 May 1810
An Act to amend an Act, passed in the Parliament of Ireland, in the Thirtieth Year of His Majesty's Reign, (Note: Road in Westmeath Act 1790 (30 Geo. 3. c. 46 (I))) for repairing the Turnpike Road leading from Kinnegad to Athlone. (Repealed by Dublin and Other Roads Turnpikes Abolition Act 1855 (18 & 19 Vict. c. 69))
Leicestershire and Warwickshire Roads Act 1810	50 Geo. 3. c. cxxxv	24 May 1810
An Act for continuing the Term and altering and enlarging the Powers of Two Acts of His present Majesty, (Note: Leicester, Warwick and Coventry Roads Act 1762 (2 Geo. 3. c. 80)) (Note: Leicester and Warwick Roads Act 1781 (21 Geo. 3. c. 85)) for repairing certain Roads lying in the Counties of Leicester and Warwick and in the County of the City of Coventry; and for amending and keeping in Repair the Road from Bourne Bridge to Blythe Bridge in the County of Warwick.
Lanfabon and Pontymoil Road and Bridges Act 1810 (repealed)	50 Geo. 3. c. cxxxvi	24 May 1810
An Act for making and maintaining a Road from a Place called Ystrad, in the Parish of Lanfabon in the County of Glamorgan, to Pontymoil, near the Town of Pontypool, in the County of Monmouth, with a collateral Branch to join the Newport Turnpike Road at Risca, in the County of Monmouth; and for building a Bridge at or near Ystrad aforesaid, and another Bridge near Penllwyn, in the County of Monmouth. (Repealed by Lanfabon and Pontymoil Road Act 1832 (2 & 3 Will. 4. c. lxxvii))
Road from Elton to Blackburn Act 1810 (repealed)	50 Geo. 3. c. cxxxvii	24 May 1810
An Act for making and maintaining a Road from Brandlesome Moss Gate, in the Township of Elton, to the Duke of York's Publick House, in the Township of Blackburn, and Three several Branches of Road therefrom, all in the County Palatine of Lancaster. (Repealed by Road from Bury to Blackburn and Branches Act 1839 (2 & 3 Vict. c. xxxi))
Lord Kirkwall's Estate Act 1810	50 Geo. 3. c. cxxxviii	24 May 1810
An Act to alter and amend an Act passed in the Forty fifth Year of the Reign of His present Majesty, intituled, "An Act to vest the settled Estates of John Hamilton Fitzmaurice, commonly called Lord Kirkwall, In the Counties of Denbigh and Flint, In Trustees in Trust to be sold for the Payment of Debts affecting the same, and his other settled Estates; and after Payment thereof, for the Investment of the Residue of the Monies to arise by such Sale, in the Purchase of other Estates to be conveyed to the Uses of the said settled Estates; and for other Purposes therein mentioned," (Note: Lord Kirkwall's Estate Act 1805 (45 Geo. 3. c. lxxxiv))
Dyemerchion Inclosure Act 1810	50 Geo. 3. c. cxxxix	24 May 1810
An Act for inclosing Lands in the Parish of Dymerchion, in the County of Flint.
Culham Inclosure Act 1810	50 Geo. 3. c. cxl	24 May 1810
An Act for inclosing Lands within the Manor and Parish of Culham, in the County of Oxford.
Romsey Improvement Act 1810 (repealed)	50 Geo. 3. c. cxli	2 June 1810
An Act for paving the Footways and Cross-paths, and lighting, cleaning and regulating the Streets, Lanes and other Publick Passages and Places in the Town and Parish of Romfey Infra, and in the Parish of Romsey Extra, in the County of Southampton. (Repealed by Romsey Extension and Improvement Act 1876 (39 & 40 Vict. c. xxxi))
Thurne Inclosure and Drainage Act 1810	50 Geo. 3. c. cxlii	2 June 1810
An Act for inclosing, draining and preserving Lands in the Parish of Thirne in the County of Norfolk.
Doddington and Chatteris Drainage Act 1810	50 Geo. 3. c. cxliii	2 June 1810
An Act for amending and enlarging the Powers of an Act of the Ninth Year of His present Majesty, (Note: Wimblington and Chatteris (Cambridgeshire) Inclosure Act 1769 (9 Geo. 3. c. 30 Pr.)) for the more effectual draining and preserving certain Fen Lands and Low Grounds in the Hamlet of Wimblington, in the Parish of Doddington, and in the Parish of Chatteris, in the Isle of Ely, in the County of Cambridge, so far as the said Act relates to the Lands in the Second District therein described.
Surrey and Kent Sewers Act 1810	50 Geo. 3. c. cxliv	2 June 1810
An Act for amending, enlarging and extending the Powers of an Act passed in the last Session of Parliament, (Note: Surrey and Kent Sewers Act 1809 (49 Geo. 3. c. clxxxiii)) relating to the Execution of the Commission of Sewers for the Limits from East Moulsey in Surrey, to Ravensborne in Kent.
Stockport Parish Church and Cemetery Act 1810	50 Geo. 3. c. cxlv	2 June 1810
An Act for repairing or rebuilding the Parish Church of Stockport in the County Palatine of Chester, and for rebuilding the Tower thereof, and for making a Cemetery or Church Yard for the Use of the said Parish.
Exeter Improvement Act 1810 (repealed)	50 Geo. 3. c. cxlvi	2 June 1810
An Act for better and more effectually paving, lighting, cleansing, watching and otherwise improving the Streets, Ways and other Publick Passages and Places in the City and County of the City of Exeter. (Repealed by Exeter Improvement Act 1832 (2 & 3 Will. 4. c. cvi))
St. Pancras Improvement Act 1810 (repealed)	50 Geo. 3. c. cxlvii	2 June 1810
An Act for forming, paving, and otherwise improving certain Streets, and other Publick Passages and Places, in the Parish of Pancras in the County of Middlesex, which are or shall be made upon Ground belonging to Joseph Lucas Esquire. (Repealed by London Government (Borough of St. Pancras) Order in Council 1901 (SR&O 1901/274))
Wilts and Berks Canal Act 1810 (repealed)	50 Geo. 3. c. cxlviii	2 June 1810
An Act to alter, amend and enlarge the Powers of Two Acts, (Note: Wilts and Berks Canal Act 1795 (35 Geo. 3. c. 52)) (Note: Wilts and Berks Canal Act 1801 (41 Geo. 3. (U.K.) c. lxviii)) passed for making and maintaining a navigable Canal from the River Thames or Isis, at or near the Town of Abingdon in the County of Berks, to join or communicate with the Kennet and Avon Canal, at or near the Town of Trowbridge in the County of Wilts, and also certain navigable Cuts therein described. (Repealed by Wilts and Berks Canal Navigation Act 1821 (1 & 2 Geo. 4. c. xcvii))
St. Luke's Parish, Middlesex, Improvement Act 1810 (repealed)	50 Geo. 3. c. cxlix	2 June 1810
An Act for making more effectual Provision for lighting, watching, paving, cleansing, regulating and improving the Streets and other Publick Places in the Parish of Saint Luke, in the County of Middlesex. (Repealed by London Government (Borough of Finsbury) Order in Council 1901 (SR&O 1901/266))
St. Mary, Islington, Water Supply Act 1810	50 Geo. 3. c. cl	2 June 1810
An Act for supplying with Water Upper and Lower Holloway, Cannonbury, Upper Islington, and their respective Vicinities, all in the Parish of Saint Mary, Islington, in the County of Middlesex, and for other Purposes relating thereto.
Port of London (Capital) Act 1810 (repealed)	50 Geo. 3. c. cli	2 June 1810
An Act for raising a further Sum of Money for carrying into Execution the several Acts passed for making Wet Docks, Basons, Cuts and other Works, for the greater Accommodation and Security of Shipping, Commerce and Revenue, within the Port of London. (Repealed by London Docks Act 1828 (9 Geo. 4. c. cxvi))
Kildare County Infirmary Act 1810 (repealed)	50 Geo. 3. c. clii	2 June 1810
An Act for authorizing the Removal of the Infirmary of the County of Kildare from the Town of Kildare to the Town of Naas. (Repealed by Statute Law (Repeals) Act 2013 (c. 2))
Bath Roads Act 1810 (repealed)	50 Geo. 3. c. cliii	2 June 1810
An Act for repealing an Act passed in the Thirty third Year of His present Majesty, intituled "An Act for amending, improving and keeping in Repair several Roads leading to and from the City of Bath;" (Note: Bath Roads Act 1793 (33 Geo. 3. c. 144)) and for granting other Powers for more effectually improving the several Roads therein described, being in and leading to and from the said City. (Repealed by Bath Roads Act 1829 (10 Geo. 4. c. cx))
Road from Northampton to Chain Bridge Act 1810 (repealed)	50 Geo. 3. c. cliv	2 June 1810
An Act for more effectually amending, widening and keeping in Repair the Roads leading from the Town of Northampton to Chain Bridge, near the Town of Market Harborough, and from the Direction Post in Kingsthorpe, in the County of Northampton, to Welford Bridge in the same County. (Repealed by Road from Northampton to Chain Bridge, Market Harborough, and from Kingsthorpe to Welford Bridge Act 1822 (3 Geo. 4. c. c))
Mildmay's Estate Act 1810	50 Geo. 3. c. clv	2 June 1810
An Act to enable Sir Henry St. John Carew St. John Mildmay Baronet, to exercise certain Powers of jointuring and charging certain settled Estates in the County of Essex with Portions for younger Children.
Hake's Estate Act 1810	50 Geo. 3. c. clvi	2 June 1810
An Act for vesting certain settled Estates late the Property of Susanna Hake deceased, in Trustees to be sold, and the money arising from such Sale, to be applied for the Benefit of the Parties entitled to the said Estates.
Lewknor and Postcomb Inclosures Act 1810	50 Geo. 3. c. clvii	2 June 1810
An Act for inclosing Lands in the Divisions of Lewknor and Postcomb, in the Parish of Lewknor in the County of Oxford.
Kidlington Inclosure Act 1810	50 Geo. 3. c. clviii	2 June 1810
An Act for inclosing Lands in the Parish of Kidlington in the County of Oxford.
Stainton and Edlington Inclosures Act 1810	50 Geo. 3. c. clix	2 June 1810
An Act for inclosing Lands in the Parishes of Stainton and Edlington, in the West Riding of the County of York.
Cheadle Inclosure Act 1810	50 Geo. 3. c. clx	2 June 1810
An Act for inclosing Lands in the Parish of Cheadle, in the County Palatine of Chester.
Rothbury Inclosure Act 1810	50 Geo. 3. c. clxi	2 June 1810
An Act for inclosing Lands in the Parish of Rothbury, in the County o£ Northumberland.
Prudhoe and Ovingham Inclosures Act 1810	50 Geo. 3. c. clxii	2 June 1810
An Act for inclosing Lands in the Barony of Prudhoe, and in the Parish of Ovingham, in the County of Northumberland.
Gas Light and Coke Company Act 1810 (repealed)	50 Geo. 3. c. clxiii	9 June 1810
An Act for granting certain Powers and Authorities to a Company to be incorporated by Charter to be called, "The Gas Light and Coke Company," for making Inflammable Air for the lighting of the Streets of the Metropolis, and for procuring Coke, Oil, Tar, Pitch, Asphaltum, (Note: Asphaltite.) Ammoniacal Liquor, (Note: Ammonia solution.) and essential Oil, from Coal, and for other Purposes relating thereto. (Repealed by Gaslight and Coke Company's Act 1868 (31 & 32 Vict. c. cvi))
Court of Chancery Act 1810 (repealed)	50 Geo. 3. c. clxiv	9 June 1810
An Act for building certain Offices for the Examiners, Cursitors, (Note: A cursitor was a clerk in the Court of Chancery who created writs.) Clerk of the Crown and Clerks of the Petty Bag, of the High Court of Chancery; and for making certain Regulations in the Examiner's Office of the said Court; and for making Provision for such of the Examiners, Deputy Examiners and Clerks, as from Length of Service, or from Age or Infirmity, are or shall be incapacitated from the due Execution of their Offices; and for making Provision for other Officers of the said Court; and for making other Payments in respect of the said Offices. (Repealed by Statute Law (Repeals) Act 2008 (c. 12))
Liverpool Water Act 1810 (repealed)	50 Geo. 3. c. clxv	9 June 1810
An Act to alter, amend and enlarge the Powers of an Act passed in the Thirty ninth Year of His present Majesty, (Note: Liverpool Water Supply Act 1799 (39 Geo. 3. c. xxxvi)) for better supplying the Town and Port of Liverpool with Water, from certain Springs in the Township of Bootle, in the County Palatine of Lancaster. (Repealed by Liverpool Corporation Act 1921 (11 & 12 Geo. 5. c. lxxiv))
Lesser Ouse or Brandon River Navigation Act 1810	50 Geo. 3. c. clxvi	9 June 1810
An Act for amending an Act of the Twenty second Year of His late Majesty, King Charles the Second, (Note: Rivers Brandon and Waveney Navigation Act 1670 (22 Cha. 2. c. 16 Pr.)) so far as the same relates to the River Brandon, otherwise the Lesser Ouze, from the White House near Brandon Ferry to Thetford in the Counties of Norfolk and Suffolk, and for improving the Navigation of the said River.
Greenock Town and Harbour Improvement and Police Act 1810	50 Geo. 3. c. clxvii	9 June 1810
An Act for altering and enlarging the Powers of several Acts of His present Majesty, for the Improvement of the Town of Greenock, and the Harbours thereof; for regulating the Police; and for other Purposes mentioned in the said Acts.
Southampton Port Improvement Act 1810	50 Geo. 3. c. clxviii	9 June 1810
An Act for altering and amending an Act made in the Forty third Year of His present Majesty's Reign (Note: Southampton Harbour Act 1803 (43 Geo. 3. c. xxi)) for improving the Port of the Town of Southampton.
Southampton Improvement Act 1810 (repealed)	50 Geo. 3. c. clxix	9 June 1810
An Act to amend an Act, made in the Tenth Year of His present Majesty, (Note: Southampton Improvement Act 1770 (10 Geo. 3. c. 25)) for paving, repairing, cleansing, lighting and watching the Streets and other publick Passages in the Town of Southampton. (Repealed by Southampton Improvement Act 1844 (7 & 8 Vict. c. lxxv))
St. Pancras Improvement (No. 2) Act 1810 (repealed)	50 Geo. 3. c. clxx	9 June 1810
An Act for paving and otherwise improving certain Streets, and other publick Passages and Places, which are or shall be made upon a certain Piece of Ground belonging to Thomas Harrison Esquire, situate in the Parish of Saint Pancras, in the County of Middlesex. (Repealed by London Government (Borough of St. Pancras) Order in Council 1901 (SR&O 1901/274))
Ashford and Buxton Turnpike Road (Derbyshire) Act 1810 (repealed)	50 Geo. 3. c. clxxi	9 June 1810
An Act for making and maintaining a Turnpike Road from Ashford to or near to Buxton, in the County of Derby. (Repealed by Ashford and Buxton, Tideswell and Blackwell, and Edensor and Ashford Turnpike Roads (Derbyshire) Act 1832 (2 & 3 Will. 4. c. iii))
Gordon and Cumming Estates Act 1810	50 Geo. 3. c. clxxii	9 June 1810
An Act for confirming and carrying into Effect an Agreement entered into on Behalf of Alexander Duke of Gordon, and by Sir Alexander Penrose Cumming Gordon Baronet, deceased; and for enabling Sir William Gordon Cumming Gordon Baronet, and Charles Lennox Cumming Esquire, and their respective Heirs, to make Exchanges of certain Parts of their respective Entailed Estates, under the Authority and by the Directions of the Court of Session in Scotland.
Duke of Norfolk's Estate Act 1810	50 Geo. 3. c. clxxiii	9 June 1810
An Act for exchanging Parts of the Fee Simple Estates of the Most Noble Charles Duke of Norfolk, in the Counties of Surrey, Sussex and Middlesex, for Parts his Settled Estates in the County of York; and for vesting several Messuages and Lands, other Parts of the Duke's Settled Estates in the said Counties of York, Sussex and Middlesex, and in the County of Nottingham, in trust to sell; and for laying out the Monies in the Purchase of more convenient Estates.
Road from Cirencester to Wootton Bassett Act 1810 (repealed)	50 Geo. 3. c. clxxiv	9 June 1810
An Act for making and maintaining a Turnpike Road from Cirencester in the County of Gloucester to Wootton Bassett in the County of Wilts, and a Branch of Road from the Malmesbury and Cirencester Turnpike Road near Crudwell Church to communicate with the Turnpike Road leading from Cricklade to Malmesbury at or near Minety Common. (Repealed by Cirencester and Wootton Bassett Roads Act 1831 (1 & 2 Will. 4. c. xli))
Lyell's Estate Act 1810	50 Geo. 3. c. clxxv	9 June 1810
An Act for vesting certain Estates in the County of Kent, late of Henry Lyell Esquire, deceased, in Trustees, to be sold, and for applying the Money arising from the Sale thereof, for defraying the Expences of inclosing certain Lands in the County of Cambridge, and for investing the Surplus Money in the Purchase of other Estates, to be settled to the subsisting Uses of the Will and Codicils of the said Henry Lyell.
Dean and Chapter of Canterbury (South Lambeth Leasings) Act 1810	50 Geo. 3. c. clxxvi	9 June 1810
An Act for empowering the Dean and Chapter of Canterbury, and their Lessees, Edmund White, John White and William Parker Terry, to grant building and repairing Leases of Lands and Buildings at South Lambeth, in the County of Surrey; pursuant to an Agreement entered into for those Purposes.
Player's Estate Act 1810	50 Geo. 3. c. clxxvii	9 June 1810
An Act for enabling Jane Player Widow, and others, to grant Leases of certain Estates at or near Ryde in the Isle of Wight, in the County of Southampton, devised by the Will of the late William Player Esquire, pursuant to an Agreement entered into for that Purpose, and also to grant Building Leases of other Parts of the same Estates.
Stratton's Estate Act 1810	50 Geo. 3. c. clxxviii	9 June 1810
An Act for discharging the Estate of George Frederick Stratton Esquire, in the Parish of Great Tew, in the County of Oxford, from certain Trusts thereof, and for substituting another Estate in the same County in lieu thereof.
Scott's Estate Act 1810	50 Geo. 3. c. clxxix	9 June 1810
An Act for vesting several Fee Farm Rents or Annual Sums, devised by the Will of Robert Scott Esquire, deceased, in Trustees, upon Trust to be sold; and for laying out the Purchase Monies, under the Direction of the High Court of Chancery, in the Purchase of other Estates, to be settled to the former Uses.
Levett's Estate Act 1810	50 Geo. 3. c. clxxx	9 June 1810
An Act for vesting certain Estates in the Counties of Stafford, Salop, Chester and Buckingham, late of the Reverend Richard Levett, Lucy his Wife, and Ellen Byrd, Spinster, in Trustees, upon trust to sell the same; and to lay out the Money arising from the Sale thereof in the Purchase of other Estates.
Ross's Estate Act 1810	50 Geo. 3. c. clxxxi	9 June 1810
An Act for effectuating a Partition of certain settled Estates of David Ross Esquire, deceased, situate in the County of Down in Ireland, and in the City of Bath in England.
Blewitt and Fettiplace Estates Act 1810	50 Geo. 3. c. clxxxii	9 June 1810
An Act for effectuating a Partition directed by the Court of Chancery of certain Estates situate in the County of Monmouth, devised by the Wills of John Blewitt Esquire, and Frances Fettiplace, deceased.
Smith and Woodgate Estates Act 1810	50 Geo. 3. c. clxxxiii	9 June 1810
An Act for effecting an Exchange between the Trustees of Henry Smith Esquire, deceased, and Henry Woodgate Esquire, of Estates in the County of Kent.
Great and Little Longstone and Wardlow Inclosures Act 1810	50 Geo. 3. c. clxxxiv	9 June 1810
An Act for inclosing Lands in the Townships of Great Longstone, Little Longstone, and Wardlow, in the County of Derby.
Wrington, Yatton and Kenn Inclosure Act 1810	50 Geo. 3. c. clxxxv	9 June 1810
An Act for inclosing Lands in the Parishes of Wrington, Yatton and Kenn, in the County of Somerset.
Caereinion Iscoed Inclosure Act 1810	50 Geo. 3. c. clxxxvi	9 June 1810
An Act for inclosing Lands in the Manor of Caereinion Iscoed, in the County of Montgomery.
Weymouth Improvement, Markets and Harbour Act 1810	50 Geo. 3. c. clxxxvii	15 June 1810
An Act for more effectually cleaning, lighting and watching the Borough and Town of Weymouth and Melcombe Regis in the County of Dorset, and removing Incroachments and Annoyances therein; for licensing and regulating Chairmen and other Persons plying for Hire; for establishing Markets; and for giving further Powers to the Quay Master of the Harbour of the said Town.
Simonburn Presentation Right Act 1810	50 Geo. 3. c. clxxxviii	15 June 1810
An Act to continue for Two Years an Act passed in the Forty eighth Year of His present Majesty, (Note: Simonburn Presentation Right Act 1808 (48 Geo. 3. c. clvii)) for preventing the Right of Presentation to the Rectory and Parish of Simonburn, in the County of Northumberland, from lapsing, for a limited Time.
Roads, Bridges and Statute Labour in Ross, Cromarty and Nairn Act 1810	50 Geo. 3. c. clxxxix	15 June 1810
An Act to amend and enlarge the Powers of an Act passed in the Forty fifth Year of His present Majesty, (Note: Roads and Bridges in Ross, Cromarty and Nairn Act 1805 (45 Geo. 3. c. xl)) for assessing the Proprietors of Lands in the County of Ross, towards the Expence of making and supporting certain Roads and Bridges therein, and of an Act passed in the Forty seventh (Note: Statute Labour, Roads and Bridges in Ross, Cromarty and Nairn Act 1807 (47 Geo. 3 Sess. 1. c. xiii)) Year of His present Majesty, for regulating and converting the Statute Labour in the Counties of Ross and Cromarty, and Part of the County of Nairn, locally situated in the County of Ross.
St. John, Hackney, Poor Relief Act 1810 (repealed)	50 Geo. 3. c. cxc	15 June 1810
An Act to alter, amend and enlarge the Powers of so much of an Act, passed in the Fourth Year of His present Majesty, (Note: Hackney Poor Relief Act 1764 (4 Geo. 3. c. 43)) as relates to the maintaining, regulating and employing the Poor within the Parish of Saint John at Hackney, in the County of Middlesex. (Repealed by London Government (Borough of Hackney) Order in Council 1901 (SR&O 1901/268))
St. George's Fields Right of Common Act 1810	50 Geo. 3. c. cxci	15 June 1810
An Act for extinguishing all Right of Common in, over and upon certain Parcels of Land in Saint George's Fields, in the County of Surrey; and for repealing so much of Two Acts passed in the Twenty sixth (Note: South London Roads Act 1786 (26 Geo. 3. c. 131)) and Forty seventh (Note: Surrey Roads Act 1807 (47 Geo. 3 Sess. 2. c. cxv)) Years of His present Majesty, as prevents the erecting Buildings on certain Parts of the said Parcels of Land, within a limited Distance from the Sides of such of the Roads therein mentioned as abut thereon; and for improving Saint George's Fields aforesaid.
Dublin Foundling Hospital Act 1810 (repealed)	50 Geo. 3. c. cxcii	15 June 1810
An Act for the better Management of the Foundling Hospital in Dublin, and for amending and further continuing an Act passed in the Parliament of Ireland, in the Fortieth Year of His present Majesty, (Note: Rotunda Hospital Act 1800 (40 Geo. 3. c. 33 (I))) for the better Management, Support and Maintenance of the Foundling Hospital in Dublin, and for amending and further continuing an Act passed in the Thirty eighth Year of His Majesty, (Note: Dublin Workhouse, &c. Act 1798 (38 Geo. 3. c. 35 (I))) for the better Management of the Workhouse and Foundling Hospital in Dublin. (Repealed by Statute Law (Repeals) Act 2013 (c. 2))
Belfast Academical Institution Act 1810	50 Geo. 3. c. cxciii	15 June 1810
An Act to incorporate and regulate an Institution, to be called "The Belfast Academical Institution," for affording to Youth a Classical and Mercantile Education.
Bedford Level Drainage Act 1810	50 Geo. 3. c. cxciv	15 June 1810
An Act to alter, amend and render more effectual Two Acts of the Twenty ninth Year of His late Majesty, (Note: Hundred Foot River and Ouse (Bedford Level) Act 1756 (29 Geo. 2. c. 22)) and the Fortieth Year of His present Majesty, (Note: Bedford Level (Hundred Foot River and Ouse) Drainage Act 1800 (39 & 40 Geo. 3. c. xxvi)) for draining and preserving certain Fen Lands, in the Isle of Ely, and County of Norfolk, lying between the Hundred Foot River and the Ouse, and bounded on the South by the Hard Lands of Mepall, Wicham, Wentworth, Wickford, Ely, Downham and Littleport; and for empowering the Governor, Bailiffs and Commonalty of the Company of Conservators of the Great Level of the Fens, commonly called Bedford Level, to sell certain Lands lying within the Limits aforesaid, called Invested Lands.
Duke of Bedford's Estate (Poor's Coal Charity) (Wavendon) Act 1810	50 Geo. 3. c. cxcv	15 June 1810
An Act for vesting a certain Plot of Land on Wandon otherwise Wavendon Heath in the County of Buckingham, in the Most Noble John Duke of Bedford in Fee Simple, and for charging the same and certain Estates of the said Duke with a perpetual Annual Rent Charge, to be payable to the Churchwardens and Overseers of the Poor of the Parish of Wandon otherwise Wavendon in the said County, in Manner and upon the Trusts therein mentioned.
Lord Rancliffe's Estate Act 1810	50 Geo. 3. c. cxcvi	15 June 1810
An Act for vesting the settled Estates at Eltham, in the County of Kent, of the Right Honourable George Augustus Henry Anne Lord Rancliffe, in Trustees upon Trust, to sell the same, or to make Grants in Fee, or Leases of the same, for the Purpose of building; and to lay out the Monies arising by such Sales in the Purchase of other Estates to be settled to the same Uses.
Lucas and Graham Estates Act 1810	50 Geo. 3. c. cxcvii	15 June 1810
An Act for exchanging the entailed Estate of the Right Honourable Amabell Baroness Lucas, in the County of Wilts, for other Estates of the said Baroness Lucas, the Right Honourable Mary Jemima Dowager Lady Grantham, and the Right Honourable Thomas Philip Lord Grantham, in the Counties of Essex and Suffolk, and for varying the Powers of Leasing in the Settlement of the said Estates in the Counties of Essex and Suffolk.
Bethlem Hospital Act 1810 (repealed)	50 Geo. 3. c. cxcviii	15 June 1810
An Act for vesting the Lease of the Governors of Bethlem Hospital in the Scite of the Hospital, in the Mayor and Commonalty and Citizens of the City of London by whom it was granted; and for authorizing the said Mayor and Commonalty and Citizens to grant certain Lands in Saint George's Fields, in lieu thereof, to Trustees for the Governors of the said Hospital for the like Term, for the Purpose of erecting a new Hospital thereon on an enlarged Scale. (Repealed by Statute Law (Repeals) Act 2013 (c. 2))
Austen's Estate Act 1810	50 Geo. 3. c. cxcix	15 June 1810
An Act for empowering the surviving Trustees under the Will of Robert Austen Esquire, deceased, to cut down certain Timber Trees on the devised Estates in the County of Surrey, and for applying the Monies thence arising in the Purchase of Estates, to be settled to the subsisting Uses of the same.
Byng's Estate Act 1810	50 Geo. 3. c. cc	15 June 1810
An Act for enabling George Byng Esquire, and others, to grant Building Leases of certain Lands and Premises, situate in the Isle of Dogs, in the County of Middlesex.
Slapton, Horton, Ivinghoe, Eddlesborough and Pightlesthorne Inclosures Act 1810	50 Geo. 3. c. cci	15 June 1810
An Act for inclosing Lands within the Parish of Slapton, in the County of Buckingham, and within the Hamlet of Horton, lying in the same Parish, and in the several Parishes of Ivinghoe, Eddleborough and Pightlesthorne, in the same County.
Whitchurch Inclosure Act 1810	50 Geo. 3. c. ccii	15 June 1810
An Act for inclosing Whitchurch Common, and other Waste Lands in the Parish of Whitchurch, in the County of Oxford.
East India Company and the Nabobs of the Carnatic Act 1810 (repealed)	50 Geo. 3. c. cciii	15 June 1810
An Act to continue until the Twenty fifth Day of March One thousand eight hundred and thirteen, the Powers of the Commissioners appointed in pursuance of an Act of the Forty sixth Year of His present Majesty, (Note: East India Company and the Nabobs of the Carnatic Act 1806 (46 Geo. 3. c. cxxxiii)) for enabling the Commissioners acting in pursuance of an Agreement between the East India Company and the private Creditors of the Nabobs of the Carnatic, the better to carry the same into Effect. (Repealed by Statute Law (Repeals) Act 2008 (c. 12))
Thames (West of London Bridge) Navigation Act 1810 (repealed)	50 Geo. 3. c. cciv	20 June 1810
An Act for amending altering and enlarging the Powers of Two Acts, passed in the Fourteenth (Note: Thames Navigation Act 1774 (14 Geo. 3. c. 91)) and Seventeenth (Note: Thames Navigation Act 1776 (17 Geo. 3. c. 18)) Years of His present Majesty, in relation to the Navigation of the River Thames Westward of London Bridge, within the Liberties of the City of London; and for the further Improvement of the said Navigation. (Repealed by Thames Conservancy Act 1894 (57 & 58 Vict. c. clxxxvii))
Dublin (Rutland Square) Lighting Act 1810	50 Geo. 3. c. ccv	20 June 1810
An Act to explain an Act of the Forty seventh Year of His present Majesty, (Note: Dublin Improvement Act 1807 (47 Geo. 3 Sess. 2. c. cix)) for the more effectual Improvement of the City of Dublin and the Environs thereof, so far as relates to the lighting of Rutland Square in the said City.
Wisbech Improvement, Cattle Market and Harbour Act 1810 or the Wisbech Improvement Act 1810	50 Geo. 3. c. ccvi	20 June 1810
An Act for establishing a Cattle Market within the Town of Wisbech, in the Isle of Ely; for taking down and removing the Shambles therein; for paving, cleansing, lighting and watching the said Town, and removing Nuisances therein; for preserving and improving the Port and Harbour of Wisbech; and for regulating the Pilots be longing thereto.
Commercial Docks Act 1810 (repealed)	50 Geo. 3. c. ccvii	20 June 1810
An Act for maintaining and improving the Docks and Warehouses, called the Commercial Docks, and for making and maintaining other Docks and Warehouses to communicate therewith, all in the Parish of Saint Mary Rotherhithe, in the County of Surrey. (Repealed by Surrey Commercial Dock Act 1864 (27 & 28 Vict. c. xxxi))
St. Paul Shadwell Poor Relief and Improvement Act 1810 (repealed)	50 Geo. 3. c. ccviii	20 June 1810
An Act for maintaining and improving the Docks and Warehouses, called the Commercial Docks, and for making and maintaining other Docks and Warehouses to communicate therewith, all in the Parish of Saint Mary Rotherhithe, in the County of Surrey. (Repealed by London Government (Borough of Stepney) Order in Council 1901 (SR&O 1901/276))
St. Botolph without Aldgate Poor Rates Act 1810 (repealed)	50 Geo. 3. c. ccix	20 June 1810
An Act for better regulating maintaining and employing the Poor within the Parish of Saint Paul Shadwell, in the County of Middlesex; for better lighting, watching, paving, cleansing, repairing and improving the Streets and other Publick Places in the said Parish; and for repealing Three Acts severally passed in the Twenty ninth Year of King George the Second, and in the Tenth (Note: St. Paul, Shadwell (Poor Relief) Act 1770 (10 Geo. 3. c. 56)) and Fifteenth (Note: London (Streets) Act 1775 (15 Geo. 3. c. 54)) Years of His present Majesty relative thereto. (Repealed by London Government (Borough of Stepney) Order in Council 1901 (SR&O 1901/276))
Burford and Banbury, Burford and Stow, and Swerford Gate and Aynho Roads Act 1810 (repealed)	50 Geo. 3. c. ccx	20 June 1810
An Act for more effectually improving the Road from Burford to Banbury, in the County of Oxford, and from Burford to the Road leading to Stow, in the County of Gloucester, and from Swerford Gate, in the County of Oxford, to Road in Aynho, in the County of Northampton. (Repealed by Burford and Banbury, Burford and Stow, and Swerford Gate and Aynho Roads Act 1832 (2 & 3 Will. 4. c. xvi))
Henry Smith's Charity and Newnham's Estate Act 1810	50 Geo. 3. c. ccxi	20 June 1810
An Act for confirming and rendering perpetual a Partition between the Trustees of Henry Smith's Charity and John Newnham Esquire, of divers Estates in Worth and Balcombe, otherwise Baulcombe, Ardingley, Crawley and Ifield, in the County of Sussex.
Trelleck, Penalt, Mitchel-Troy, Cwmcarvon, Landogo, Tintern and Lanishen Inclosures Act 1810	50 Geo. 3. c. ccxii	20 June 1810
An Act for inclosing Lands within the Parishes of Trelleck, Penalt, Mitchel Troy, Cwmcarvan, Landogo, Tintern and Laineshen, in the County of Monmouth.
Nether Kellet Inclosure Act 1810	50 Geo. 3. c. ccxiii	20 June 1810
An Act for inclosing Lands in the Manor of Nether Kellet, in the Parish of Bolton by the Sands, in the County Palatine of Lancaster.
Drury Lane Theatre Act 1810	50 Geo. 3. c. ccxiv	21 June 1810
An Act for rebuilding the late Theatre Royal Drury Lane, upon the Conditions and under the Regulations therein mentioned.
Severn and Wye Railway and Canal Act 1810	50 Geo. 3. c. ccxv	21 June 1810
An Act to alter and amend the Lidney and Lidbrook Railway Act, (Note: Lydney and Lidbrook Railway Act 1809 (49 Geo. 3. c. clix)) to vary certain Parts of the said Railway, and to extend the same from Lidbrook to Bishop's Wood, and from the Lower Forge to the Cross Pill, and for making a Bason and Canal to communicate with the River Severn at Nass Point.
Tremadoc Chapel of Ease Act 1810	50 Geo. 3. c. ccxvi	21 June 1810
An Act for establishing a Chapel of Ease at Tremadoc, in the Chapelry of Tnyfeynhaiarn, in the County of Carnarvon.
Phillipson's Estate Act 1810	50 Geo. 3. c. ccxvii	21 June 1810
An Act for removing One of the Trustees of the settled Estates and the other settled Property of the Reverend Richard Burton Burton Phillipson, and for vesting the same in other Trustees, and for enabling the High Court of Chancery to appoint new Trustees.
Bere Forest Inclosure Act 1810 (repealed)	50 Geo. 3. c. ccxviii	21 June 1810
An Act for disafforesting the Forest of South otherwise East Bere otherwise Bier, in the County of Southampton, and for inclosing the Open Commonable Lands within the said Forest. (Repealed by Bere Forest Inclosure Act 1815 (55 Geo. 3. c. 61 Pr.), Crown Estate Act 1961 (9 & 10 Eliz. 2. c. 55) and Wild Creatures and Forest Laws Act 1971 (c. 47))

=== Private acts ===
Short title	Citation	Royal assent
Long title
Wellesley's Divorce Act 1810	50 Geo. 3. c. 1 Pr.	22 February 1810
An Act to dissolve the Marriage of the Right Honourable Henry Wellesley with the Right Honourable Charlotte Wellesley, his now Wife and to enable him marry again; and for other Purposes therein mentioned.
Fredricks' Naturalization Act 1810	50 Geo. 3. c. 2 Pr.	22 February 1810
An Act for naturalizing Fredrick Fredricks.
Yaxham, &c, Inclosure Act 1810	50 Geo. 3. c. 3 Pr.	12 March 1810
An Act for inclosing Lands in the Parishes of Yaxham, Westfield, Whinbergh, and Garvestone, in the County of Norfolk.
Heisch's Naturalization Act 1810	50 Geo. 3. c. 4 Pr.	12 March 1810
An Act for naturalizing Philip Jacob Heisch.
Brandstrom's Naturalization Act 1810	50 Geo. 3. c. 5 Pr.	12 March 1810
An Act for naturalizing John Simon Brandstrom.
Glasson Inclosure Act 1810	50 Geo. 3. c. 6 Pr.	21 March 1810
An Act for inclosing Lands in Glasson, in the County of Cumberland.
Kirkbride Inclosure Act 1810	50 Geo. 3. c. 7 Pr.	21 March 1810
An Act for inclosing Lands in Kirkbride, in the County of Cumberland.
Warblington Inclosure Act 1810	50 Geo. 3. c. 8 Pr.	21 March 1810
An Act for inclosing Lands in the Parish of Warblington, in the County of Southampton.
Staudenmayer's Naturalization Act 1810	50 Geo. 3. c. 9 Pr.	21 March 1810
An Act for naturalizing Samuel Henry Staudenmayer.
Lagemann's Naturalization Act 1810	50 Geo. 3. c. 10 Pr.	21 March 1810
An Act for naturalizing William Lagemann.
Neuman's Naturalization Act 1810	50 Geo. 3. c. 11 Pr.	21 March 1810
An Act for naturalizing Charles William Neuman.
Reinholdt af Uhr's Naturalization Act 1810	50 Geo. 3. c. 12 Pr.	21 March 1810
An Act for naturalizing Andrew Reinholdt af Uhr.
Blechingley and Horne Inclosure Act 1810	50 Geo. 3. c. 13 Pr.	24 March 1810
An Act for inclosing Lands in the Parishes of Blechingley and Horne, in the County of Surrey.
Stanway Inclosure Act 1810	50 Geo. 3. c. 14 Pr.	6 April 1810
An Act for inclosing Lands in the Parish of Stanway, in the County of Gloucester.
Tollerton Inclosure etc. Act 1810	50 Geo. 3. c. 15 Pr.	6 April 1810
An Act for inclosing Lands in the Township of Tollerton, in the Parish of Alne, in the North Riding of the County of York.
Thuxton Inclosure Act 1810	50 Geo. 3. c. 16 Pr.	6 April 1810
An Act for inclosing Lands in the Parish of Thuxton, in the County of Norfolk.
Whitfield Inclosure Act 1810	50 Geo. 3. c. 17 Pr.	6 April 1810
An Act for inclosing Lands in the Hamlet or Township of Whitfield, in the Manor and Parish of Glassop, in the County of Derby.
Chitterne St. Mary Inclosure Act 1810 (repealed)	50 Geo. 3. c. 18 Pr.	6 April 1810
An Act for inclosing Lands in the Manor and Parish Chitterne Saint Mary, in the County of Wilts. (Repealed by Chitterne St. Mary and Chitterne All Saints (Wiltshire) Inclosure Act 1815 (55 Geo. 3. c. 67 Pr.))
Haslingfield Inclosure Act 1810	50 Geo. 3. c. 19 Pr.	6 April 1810
An Act for inclosing Lands in the Parish of Haslingfield, in the County of Cambridge.
Lewisham Inclosure Act 1810	50 Geo. 3. c. 20 Pr.	18 April 1810
An Act for inclosing Lands in the Parish of Lewisham, in the County of Kent.
Hemsby Inclosure Act 1810	50 Geo. 3. c. 21 Pr.	18 April 1810
An Act for inclosing Lands in the Parish of Hemsby, in the County of Norfolk.
Hardley and Langley Inclosure Act 1810	50 Geo. 3. c. 22 Pr.	18 April 1810
An Act for inclosing Lands in the Parishes of Hardley and Langley, in the County of Norfolk.
Badsworth Inclosure Act 1810	50 Geo. 3. c. 23 Pr.	18 April 1810
An Act for inclosing Lands in the Township of Badsworth, in the County of York.
Holt Inclosure Act 1810	50 Geo. 3. c. 24 Pr.	18 April 1810
An Act for inclosing Lands in the Manor and Parish of Holt, in the County of Worcester.
Hunshelf Inclosure Act 1810	50 Geo. 3. c. 25 Pr.	18 April 1810
An Act for inclosing Lands in Hunshelf, in the West Riding of the County of York.
Attercliffe and Darnal Inclosure Act 1810	50 Geo. 3. c. 26 Pr.	18 April 1810
An Act for inclosing Lands in the Townships of Attercliffe and Darnal, in the Parish of Sheffield, in the County of York.
Garforth Inclosure Act 1810	50 Geo. 3. c. 27 Pr.	18 April 1810
An Act for inclosing the Common Fields, Common and Waste Grounds, within the Manor and Township of Garforth, in the West Riding of the County of York.
Sedgberrow Inclosure Act 1810	50 Geo. 3. c. 28 Pr.	18 April 1810
An Act for inclosing Lands in the Parish of Sedgberrow, in the County of Worcester.
Sellinge Inclosure Act 1810	50 Geo. 3. c. 29 Pr.	18 April 1810
An Act for inclosing Lands in the Parish of Sellinge, in the County of Kent.
Barley Inclosure Act 1810	50 Geo. 3. c. 30 Pr.	18 April 1810
An Act for allotting Lands in the Parish of Barley, in the County of Hertford.
Bertheau's Naturalization Act 1810	50 Geo. 3. c. 31 Pr.	18 April 1810
An Act for naturalizing Paul William Bertheau.
Horn's Naturalization Act 1810	50 Geo. 3. c. 32 Pr.	18 April 1810
An Act for naturalizing Frederick James Horn.
Sack's Naturalization Act 1810	50 Geo. 3. c. 33 Pr.	18 April 1810
An Act for naturalizing Frederick Sack.
Leiston and Theberton Inclosure Act 1810	50 Geo. 3. c. 34 Pr.	18 May 1810
An Act for inclosing Lands within the Parishes of Leiston and Theberton, in the County of Suffolk.
Amberley Inclosure Act 1810	50 Geo. 3. c. 35 Pr.	18 May 1810
An Act for inclosing Lands in the Manor of Amberley, in the County of Sussex.
Brundholme Inclosure Act 1810	50 Geo. 3. c. 36 Pr.	18 May 1810
An Act for inclosing Lands in the Manor of Brundholme, in the County of Cumberland.
Llangunnor and Llanddarog Inclosure Act 1810	50 Geo. 3. c. 37 Pr.	18 May 1810
An Act for inclosing Lands in the Parishes of Llangunnor and Llanddarog, in the County of Carmarthen.
Thorington Inclosure Act 1810	50 Geo. 3. c. 38 Pr.	18 May 1810
An Act for inclosing Lands in the Manor and Parish of Thorington, in the County of Essex.
Roxton Inclosure etc. Act 1810	50 Geo. 3. c. 39 Pr.	18 May 1810
An Act for inclosing Lands in the Parish of Roxton, in the County of Bedford.
Pensham Inclosure Act 1810	50 Geo. 3. c. 40 Pr.	18 May 1810
An Act for inclosing Lands in the Hamlet of Pensham, in the Parish of Saint Andrew in Pershore, in the County of Worcester.
Walditch Inclosure Act 1810	50 Geo. 3. c. 41 Pr.	18 May 1810
An Act for inclosing Lands in the Parish of Walditch, in the County of Dorset.
Alvington Inclosure Act 1810	50 Geo. 3. c. 42 Pr.	18 May 1810
An Act for inclosing Lands in the Parish of Alvington, in the County of Gloucester.
Horley Inclosure Act 1810	50 Geo. 3. c. 43 Pr.	18 May 1810
An Act for inclosing Lands in the Parish of Horley, in the County of Surrey.
Allerpeverell Inclosure Act 1810	50 Geo. 3. c. 44 Pr.	18 May 1810
An Act for inclosing Lands in the Manor of Allerpeverell, in the Parish of Columpton, in the County of Devon.
Bunhill Inclosure Act 1810	50 Geo. 3. c. 45 Pr.	18 May 1810
An Act for inclosing Lands within the Manor of Bonehill otherwise Bunhill, in the Parish of Bromsgrove, in the County of Worcester.
Portsea Inclosure Act 1810	50 Geo. 3. c. 46 Pr.	18 May 1810
An Act for inclosing Lands in Portsea, in the County of Southampton.
Fridaythorpe Inclosure Act 1810	50 Geo. 3. c. 47 Pr.	18 May 1810
An Act for inclosing Lands in the Parish of Fridaythorpe, in the East Riding of the County of York.
Soulby Inclosure Act 1810	50 Geo. 3. c. 48 Pr.	18 May 1810
An Act for inclosing Lands within the Manor of Soulby, in the County of Westmorland.
Wath upon Dearne Inclosure Act 1810	50 Geo. 3. c. 49 Pr.	18 May 1810
An Act for inclosing Lands in the Township of Wath upon Dearne, in the County of York.
Boston East Inclosure Act 1810	50 Geo. 3. c. 50 Pr.	18 May 1810
An Act for inclosing Lands in that Part of the Parish of Boston, in the County of Lincoln, called Boston East.
Gilling Inclosure Act 1810	50 Geo. 3. c. 51 Pr.	18 May 1810
An Act for inclosing Lands in the Township and Parish of Gilling, in Richmondshire, in the County of York.
Glyndyfrdwy, &c. Inclosure Act 1810	50 Geo. 3. c. 52 Pr.	24 May 1810
An Act for inclosing the Commons and Waste Lands in the Manors of Glyndyfrdwy otherwise Glyndwrdwy, Rûg and Gwyddelwern, in the County of Merioneth.
Fishtoft Inclosure Act 1810	50 Geo. 3. c. 53 Pr.	24 May 1810
An Act for inclosing Lands in the Parish of Fishtoft, in the County of Lincoln.
Gosforth Inclosure Act 1810	50 Geo. 3. c. 54 Pr.	24 May 1810
An Act for inclosing Lands in the Parish of Gosforth, in the County of Cumberland.
Great Sheepey Inclosure Act 1810	50 Geo. 3. c. 55 Pr.	24 May 1810
An Act for confirming and establishing the Division and Inclosure of certain Lands in the Township of Great Sheepey, in the Parish of Sheepey, in the County of Leicester.
Llanaber, &c. Inclosure Act 1810	50 Geo. 3. c. 56 Pr.	24 May 1810
An Act for inclosing Lands in the Parishes of Llanaber, Llanddwywe, Llanenddwyn, Llanbedr and Llanfair, in the County of Merioneth.
Litton Cheney Inclosure Act 1810	50 Geo. 3. c. 57 Pr.	24 May 1810
An Act for inclosing Lands in the Parish of Litton Cheney, in the County of Dorset.
Winterborn-Stoke and Stapleford Inclosure Act 1810	50 Geo. 3. c. 58 Pr.	24 May 1810
An Act for allotting Lands in the Parishes of Winterborn Stoke and Stapleford, in the County of Wilts.
Weston-super-Mare Inclosure Act 1810	50 Geo. 3. c. 59 Pr.	24 May 1810
An Act for inclosing Lands in the Parish of Weston super Mare, in the County of Somerset.
Sibsey Inclosure Act 1810	50 Geo. 3. c. 60 Pr.	24 May 1810
An Act for inclosing Lands in the Parish of Sibsey, in the County of Lincoln.
Gordon's Estate Act 1810	50 Geo. 3. c. 61 Pr.	2 June 1810
An Act to enable Robert Gordon Esquire, and Elizabeth Anne his Wife, notwithstanding the Minority of the said Elizabeth Anne Gordon, to make a Settlement of her Estates, pursuant to Articles entered into previously to their Marriage.
Thorp Audlin Inclosure Act 1810	50 Geo. 3. c. 62 Pr.	2 June 1810
An Act for inclosing Lands in the Township of Thorp Audlin, in the Parish of Badsworth, in the West Riding of the County of York.
Datchet Inclosure Act 1810	50 Geo. 3. c. 63 Pr.	2 June 1810
An Act for inclosing Lands in the Parish of Datchet, in the County of Buckingham.
Mare Inclosure Act 1810	50 Geo. 3. c. 64 Pr.	2 June 1810
An Act for confirming and establishing the Division, Allotment and Inclosure of a certain Common or Parcel of Waste Land called Mare Heath, and other Waste Lands within the Manor and Parish of Mare, in the County of Stafford.
Saddleworth Inclosure Act 1810	50 Geo. 3. c. 65 Pr.	2 June 1810
An Act for inclosing Lands in the Parish of Saddleworth, in the West Riding of the County of York.
Stoke Poges and Wexham Inclosure Act 1810	50 Geo. 3. c. 66 Pr.	2 June 1810
An Act for inclosing Lands within the Parishes of Stoke Pages and Wexham, in the County of Buckingham.
Ickleton Inclosure Act 1810	50 Geo. 3. c. 67 Pr.	2 June 1810
An Act for dividing and allotting Lands in the Parish of Ickleton, in the County of Cambridge.
Teversham Inclosure Act 1810	50 Geo. 3. c. 68 Pr.	2 June 1810
An Act for inclosing Lands in the Parish of Teversham, in the County of Cambridge.
West Cottingwith and Thorganby Inclosure Act 1810	50 Geo. 3. c. 69 Pr.	2 June 1810
An Act for inclosing Lands in the Townships of West Cottingwith and Thorganby, in the Parish of Thorganby, in the East Riding of the County of York.
Gowthorpe Inclosure Act 1810	50 Geo. 3. c. 70 Pr.	2 June 1810
An Act for inclosing Lands in the Township of Gowthorpe, in the Parish of Bishop Wilton, in the County of York.
Gayton Inclosure Act 1810	50 Geo. 3. c. 71 Pr.	2 June 1810
An Act for inclosing Lands in the Parish of Gayton otherwise Geyton, in the County of Norfolk.
Tibberton Inclosure Act 1810	50 Geo. 3. c. 72 Pr.	2 June 1810
An Act for inclosing Lands in the Parish of Tibberton, in the County of Worcester.
Hutton Conyers, &c. Inclosure Act 1810	50 Geo. 3. c. 73 Pr.	2 June 1810
An Act for inclosing Lands in the Townships of Hutton Conyers, Rainton with Newby and Melmerby, in the North Riding of the County of York.
Kingston Inclosure Act 1810	50 Geo. 3. c. 74 Pr.	2 June 1810
An Act for inclosing Lands in the Parish of Kingston, in the County of Cambridge.
Pitton and Farley Inclosure Act 1810	50 Geo. 3. c. 75 Pr.	2 June 1810
An Act for inclosing Lands in the Parish of Pitton and Farley, in the County of Wilts.
West Monkton Inclosure Act 1810	50 Geo. 3. c. 76 Pr.	2 June 1810
An Act for inclosing Lands in the Parish of West Monkton, in the County of Somerset.
Maze's Naturalization Act 1810	50 Geo. 3. c. 77 Pr.	2 June 1810
An Act for naturalizing Peter Maze.
Sandmark's Naturalization Act 1810	50 Geo. 3. c. 78 Pr.	2 June 1810
An Act for naturalizing Andrew Sandmark.
Earl of Hyndford's Estate Act 1810	50 Geo. 3. c. 79 Pr.	9 June 1810
An Act for empowering the Judges of the Court of Session in Scotland to sell certain Parts of the Lands contained in a Deed of Entail made by the late John Earl of Hyndford, and to apply the Price to be received for the said Parts in the Purchase of the Lands of Scotston lying contiguous to the said entailed Estates, and to apply any Surplus of the said Price in manner therein mentioned.
Powell's Estate Act 1810	50 Geo. 3. c. 80 Pr.	9 June 1810
An Act for exchanging Part of the Fee Simple Estate of John Powell Esquire, situate in the County of Salop, for other his settled Estates in the County of Montgomery.
Stepleton Inclosure Act 1810	50 Geo. 3. c. 81 Pr.	9 June 1810
An Act for inclosing Lands in the Township of Stepleton, in the Parish of Preseign, in the County of Hereford.
Wigmore Inclosure Act 1810	50 Geo. 3. c. 82 Pr.	9 June 1810
An Act for inclosing Lands in the Parish of Wigmore, in the County of Hereford
Eckington Inclosure Act 1810	50 Geo. 3. c. 83 Pr.	9 June 1810
An Act for inclosing Lands in the Parish of Eckington, in the County of Worcester.
Ashridge Inclosure Act 1810	50 Geo. 3. c. 84 Pr.	9 June 1810
An Act for inclosing Lands in the Manor of Ashridge, in the County of Wilts.
Guard's Divorce Act 1810	50 Geo. 3. c. 85 Pr.	9 June 1810
An Act to dissolve the Marriage of William Guard Esquire, with Margaret Letitia his now Wife, and to enable him to marry again; and for other Purposes therein mentioned.
Earl of Essex and Sir Walter Devereux's Heirs' Estates Act 1810	50 Geo. 3. c. 86 Pr.	15 June 1810
An Act for vesting the Manor of Pembroke otherwise Monkton, and other Hereditaments in the County of Pembroke, granted by Queen Elizabeth to Robert Earl of Essex, and the Heirs Male of the Body of Sir Walter Devereux, Lord of Ferrers and Charteley, in Trustees to be conveyed to John Owen Esquire, for the Consideration therein mentioned; and for laying out the Money arising thereby in the Purchase of other Estates to be settled in lieu thereof and to the same Uses.
Waltham St. Lawrence Inclosure Act 1810	50 Geo. 3. c. 87 Pr.	15 June 1810
An Act for inclosing Waste Lands within the Manor of Waltham Saint Lawrence, and also in so much of the Manor of Hall as lies within the Parish of Waltham Saint Lawrence, in the County of Berks.
Battisford Inclosure Act 1810	50 Geo. 3. c. 88 Pr.	15 June 1810
An Act for inclosing a certain Common or Waste Ground called Battisford Tye, in the Parish of Battisford, in the County of Suffolk.
Launton Inclosure Act 1810	50 Geo. 3. c. 89 Pr.	15 June 1810
An Act for inclosing Lands in the Parish of Launton, in the County of Oxford.
Langford Inclosure Act 1810	50 Geo. 3. c. 90 Pr.	15 June 1810
An Act to amend, alter and explain an Act, passed in the Forty eighth Year of His present Majesty, (Note: Langford Inclosure Act 1808 (48 Geo. 3. c. 54 Pr.)) for inclosing Lands in the Township of Langford, in the Counties of Berks and Oxford, or one of them.
Countess of Pembroke and Montgomery's Naturalization Act 1810	50 Geo. 3. c. 91 Pr.	15 June 1810
An Act for naturalizing the Right Honourable Catherine Countess of Pembroke and Montgomery.
Carrighan's Naturalization Act 1810	50 Geo. 3. c. 92 Pr.	15 June 1810
An Act for naturalizing Andrew Joseph Gosli Carrighan.
Favre's Naturalization Act 1810	50 Geo. 3. c. 93 Pr.	15 June 1810
An Act for naturalizing Paul Theodore Favre.
Withcall Inclosure Act 1810	50 Geo. 3. c. 94 Pr.	20 June 1810
An Act for allotting Lands in the Parish of Withcall, in the County of Lincoln.
Grön's Naturalization Act 1810	50 Geo. 3. c. 95 Pr.	21 June 1810
An Act for naturalizing Hans George Gron.
Burckhardt's Naturalization Act 1810	50 Geo. 3. c. 96 Pr.	21 June 1810
An Act for naturalizing Johann Christian Burckhardt.

=== Sources ===
- The Statutes of the United Kingdom of Great Britain and Ireland. Vol. 49: 50 George III. London: Joseph Butterworth. 1810 – via Internet Archive.
- Raithby, John, ed. (1812). The Statutes of the United Kingdom of Great Britain and Ireland. Vol. 4: From AD 1810, 50 George III to AD 1812, 52 George III. London: Eyre and Strahan – via Google Books.
- Journal of the House of Commons. Vol. 65. London: His Majesty's Stationery Office. pp. 3–511 – via Google Books.
- Chronological Table of and Index to the Statutes. Vol. 1: To the End of the Session 59 Vict. Sess. 2 (1895) (13th ed.). London: Her Majesty's Stationery Office. 1896. pp. 194–196 – via Google Books.

== See also ==
- List of acts of the Parliament of the United Kingdom
