= 4th Parliament of King James I =

17th-century Parliament of England

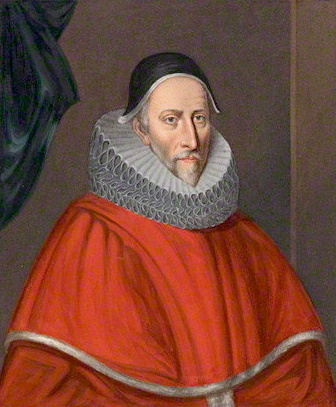
Sir Thomas Crewe, Speaker

The 4th Parliament of King James I was the fourth and last Parliament of England of the reign of James I of England, summoned on 30 December 1623, sitting from 19 February 1624 to 29 May 1624, and thereafter kept out of session with repeated prorogations, it was dissolved on the death of the King on 27 March 1625. The Speaker of the House of Commons was Sir Thomas Crewe, the member for Aylesbury.

== History ==
The parliament was referred to as "Fælix Parliamentum" or the "Happy Parliament" by Sir Edward Coke. The three previous parliaments of James I had been a source of conflict and the King's opening address to the Commons commented on the "desire of all parties to forget past disagreements." However the parliamentary session was clouded by mutual suspicion and nearly every speech made tacit or explicit comments with reference to previous sessions. Charles, Prince of Wales and the Duke of Buckingham used the Parliament to aid their push for a war against Spain. Buckingham and Charles played a large role in ensuring the impeachment of Lord High Treasurer Lionel Cranfield, who was opposed to a war for financial reasons.

The Fourth Parliament sat for only one session (labelled in statutes as "21 James I"), which ran from 19 February 1624 to 29 May 1624. Its second session was scheduled to start on 2 November 1624, but it was prorogued before opening to 16 February 1625 then again to 15 March and once more to 20 April. However, before that last date arrived, King James I died (27 March 1625), and the Fourth Parliament was dissolved.

== Notable acts passed in the Parliament ==
- Statute of Monopolies 1623
- Common Informers Act 1623
- Intrusions Act 1623
- Forcible Entry Act 1623
- Limitation Act 1623
- Crown Lands Act 1623

== See also ==
- List of MPs elected to the English parliament in 1624
- List of acts of the 4th Parliament of King James I
- List of parliaments of England
- Duration of English parliaments before 1660
