= Forcible Entry Act =

Stock short title used for legislation

Forcible Entry Act is a stock short title used for legislation in the jurisdictions of both the United Kingdom and Ireland relating to forcible entry.

== List ==
Acts of the Parliament of England

- The Forcible Entry Act 1381 (5 Ric. 2 Stat. 1. c. 7)
- The Forcible Entry Act 1391 (15 Ric. 2. c. 2)
- The Forcible Entry Act 1429 (8 Hen. 6. c. 9)
- The Forcible Entry Act 1588 (31 Eliz. 1. c. 11)
- The Forcible Entry Act 1623 (21 Jas. 1. c. 15)

Act of the Parliament of Ireland

- The Forcible Entry Act 1786 (26 Geo. 3. c. 24 (I)) (Repealed by section 16 of, and the Third Schedule to the Criminal Law Act, 1997)

== See also ==
List of short titles
