= List of acts of the Parliament of England, 1377–1397 =

This is a list of acts of the Parliament of England for the years 1377 until 1397.

For acts passed during the period 1707–1800, see the list of acts of the Parliament of Great Britain. See also the list of acts of the Parliament of Scotland and the list of acts of the Parliament of Ireland.

For acts passed from 1801 onwards, see the list of acts of the Parliament of the United Kingdom. For acts of the devolved parliaments and assemblies in the United Kingdom, see the list of acts of the Scottish Parliament, the list of acts of the Northern Ireland Assembly, and the list of acts and measures of Senedd Cymru; see also the list of acts of the Parliament of Northern Ireland.

For medieval statutes, etc. that are not considered to be acts of Parliament, see the list of English statutes.

The number shown after each act's title is its chapter number. Acts are cited using this number, preceded by the year(s) of the reign during which the relevant parliamentary session was held; thus the Union with Ireland Act 1800 is cited as "39 & 40 Geo. 3. c. 67", meaning the 67th act passed during the session that started in the 39th year of the reign of George III and which finished in the 40th year of that reign. Note that the modern convention is to use Arabic numerals in citations (thus "41 Geo. 3" rather than "41 Geo. III"). Acts of the last session of the Parliament of Great Britain and the first session of the Parliament of the United Kingdom are both cited as "41 Geo. 3".

Acts passed by the Parliament of England did not have a short title; however, some of these acts have subsequently been given a short title by acts of the Parliament of the United Kingdom (such as the Short Titles Act 1896).

Acts passed by the Parliament of England were deemed to have come into effect on the first day of the session in which they were passed. Because of this, the years given in the list below may in fact be the year before a particular act was passed.

== 1377 (1 Ric. 2) ==
The 1st Parliament of King Richard II, which met from 13 October 1377 until 5 December 1377.

This session was also traditionally cited as 1 R. 2 or 1 Rich. 2.

- (Confirmation of charters, etc.) c. 1 A confirmation of the liberties of the church, and of all statutes not repealed. — repealed for England and Wales by Statute Law Revision Act 1863 (26 & 27 Vict. c. 125) and for Ireland by Statute Law (Ireland) Revision Act 1872 (35 & 36 Vict. c. 98)
- (Peace of the realm, etc.) c. 2 The peace shall be kept, and justice shall be done to all persons. — repealed for England and Wales by Statute Law Revision Act 1863 (26 & 27 Vict. c. 125) and for Ireland by Statute Law (Ireland) Revision Act 1872 (35 & 36 Vict. c. 98)
- (Purveyance) c. 3 Prelants shall have their action of trespass against purveyors offending. — repealed for England and Wales by Statute Law Revision Act 1863 (26 & 27 Vict. c. 125) and for Ireland by Statute Law (Ireland) Revision Act 1872 (35 & 36 Vict. c. 98)
- (Penalties for maintenance) c. 4 The several penalties of several persons that do maintain quarrels. — repealed by Criminal Law Act 1967 (c. 58)
- (Officers of the Exchequer) c. 5 The punishment of a clerk of the exchequer making process for a debt paid. — repealed for England and Wales by Statute Law Revision Act 1863 (26 & 27 Vict. c. 125) and for Ireland by Statute Law (Ireland) Revision Act 1872 (35 & 36 Vict. c. 98)
- (Villanies) c. 6 Commissions shall be awarded to enquire of and punish the misbehaviour of villains and land-tenants to their lords. — repealed for England and Wales by Statute Law Revision Act 1863 (26 & 27 Vict. c. 125) and for Ireland by Statute Law (Ireland) Revision Act 1872 (35 & 36 Vict. c. 98)
- (Maintenance) c. 7 There shall be no giving of liveries for maintenance. — repealed for England and Wales by Statute Law Revision Act 1863 (26 & 27 Vict. c. 125) and for Ireland by Statute Law (Ireland) Revision Act 1872 (35 & 36 Vict. c. 98)
- (Protections) c. 8 In what case a protection cum clausula volumus is not allowable. — repealed for England and Wales by Statute Law Revision Act 1863 (26 & 27 Vict. c. 125) and for Ireland by Statute Law (Ireland) Revision Act 1872 (35 & 36 Vict. c. 98)
- (Maintenance, etc.) c. 9 A feoffment of lands or gift of goods for maintenance shall be void. An assise is maintainable against the pernor of the profits of lands. — repealed for England and Wales by Statute Law Revision Act 1863 (26 & 27 Vict. c. 125) and for Ireland by Statute Law (Ireland) Revision Act 1872 (35 & 36 Vict. c. 98)
- (Confirmation of pardons) c. 10 A confirmation of the pardon granted by King Edw. III. in the 50th year of his reign. — repealed for England and Wales by Statute Law Revision Act 1863 (26 & 27 Vict. c. 125) and for Ireland by Statute Law (Ireland) Revision Act 1872 (35 & 36 Vict. c. 98)
- (Sheriffs (re-appointment)) c. 11 None that hath been sheriff shall be so again within three years. — repealed by Sheriffs Act 1887 (50 & 51 Vict. c. 55)
- Prisoners for Debt Act 1377 c. 12 A prisoner by judgement shall not be let at large. Confession of a debt to the King to delay another's execution. — repealed by Civil Procedure Acts Repeal Act 1879 (42 & 43 Vict. c. 59)
- (Suits in spiritual courts) c. 13 Ecclesiastical judges shall not be vexed for suits for tithes in spiritual court. — repealed for England and Wales by Statute Law Revision Act 1863 (26 & 27 Vict. c. 125) and for Ireland by Statute Law (Ireland) Revision Act 1872 (35 & 36 Vict. c. 98)
- (Tithes) c. 14 In an action for goods taken away, the defendant maketh title for tithes due to the church. — repealed for England and Wales by Statute Law Revision Act 1863 (26 & 27 Vict. c. 125) and for Ireland by Statute Law (Ireland) Revision Act 1872 (35 & 36 Vict. c. 98)
- (Arrest of clergy) c. 15 The penalty for arresting of priests during divine service. — repealed for England and Wales by Offences Against the Person Act 1828 (9 Geo. 4. c. 31), for Ireland by Offences Against the Person (Ireland) Act 1829 (10 Geo. 4. c. 34) and for India by Criminal Law (India) Act 1828 (9 Geo. 4. c. 74)

=== Sources ===
- Chronological Table of and Index to the Statutes. Vol. 1: To the End of the Session 59 Vict. Sess. 2 (1895) (13th ed.). London: Her Majesty's Stationery Office. 1896. p. 29 – via Google Books.
- Chronological Table of the Statutes: Covering the Period from 1235 to the End of 1971. London: Her Majesty's Stationery Office. 1972. p. 24. ISBN 978-0-11-840096-1 – via Google Books.

== 1378 (2 Ric. 2. Stat. 1) ==
The 2nd Parliament of King Richard II, which met at Gloucester from 20 October 1378 until 16 November 1378.

This session was also traditionally cited as 2 Ric. 2, 2 R. 2. Stat. 1, 2 R. 2, 2 Rich. 2. Stat. 1 or 2 Rich. 2.

- (Merchants) c. 1 All merchants may buy and sell within the realm without disturbance. — repealed for England and Wales by Statute Law Revision Act 1863 (26 & 27 Vict. c. 125) and for Ireland by Statute Law (Ireland) Revision Act 1872 (35 & 36 Vict. c. 98)
- (Confirmation of statutes) c. 2 A confirmation of the statute 25 Edw. III. stat. 4. cap. 3. (Note: 25 Edw. 3. Stat. 3. c. 3) against forstallers. — repealed by Forestalling, Regrating, etc. Act 1844 (7 & 8 Vict. c. 24)
- (Merchants) c. 3 Merchants of the west may buy merchandises, so that they find sureties to carry them to the west, or to Calais. — repealed by Repeal of Acts Concerning Importation Act 1822 (3 Geo. 4. c. 41)
- c. 4 The penalty of mariners retained to serve the King on the sea, which do depart without licence. — repealed for England and Wales by Statute Law Revision Act 1863 (26 & 27 Vict. c. 125) and for Ireland by Statute Law (Ireland) Revision Act 1872 (35 & 36 Vict. c. 98)
- Scandalum Magnatum Act 1378 c. 5 The penalty for telling slanderous lyes of the great men of the realm. — repealed by Statute Law Revision Act 1887 (50 & 51 Vict. c. 59)
- Riots Act 1378 c. 6 Commissions shall be awarded to arrest rioters, and other persons offensive to the peace, and to imprison them. — repealed for England and Wales by Statute Law Revision Act 1863 (26 & 27 Vict. c. 125) and for Ireland by Statute Law (Ireland) Revision Act 1872 (35 & 36 Vict. c. 98)
- Pope Urban VI Act 1378 c. 7 Urban was duly chosen pope, and so ought to be accepted and obeyed. — repealed for England and Wales by Statute Law Revision Act 1863 (26 & 27 Vict. c. 125) and for Ireland by Statute Law (Ireland) Revision Act 1872 (35 & 36 Vict. c. 98)
- (Confirmation of statutes) c. 8 The statute of 23 Edw. 3. (Note: Ordinance of Labourers 1349 (23 Edw. 3)) and all other statutes of labourers, &c., confirmed. — repealed for England and Wales by Statute Law Revision Act 1863 (26 & 27 Vict. c. 125) and for Ireland by Statute Law (Ireland) Revision Act 1872 (35 & 36 Vict. c. 98)

=== Sources ===
- Chronological Table of and Index to the Statutes. Vol. 1: To the End of the Session 59 Vict. Sess. 2 (1895) (13th ed.). London: Her Majesty's Stationery Office. 1896. p. 29 – via Google Books.
- Chronological Table of the Statutes: Covering the Period from 1235 to the End of 1971. London: Her Majesty's Stationery Office. 1972. p. 24. ISBN 978-0-11-840096-1 – via Google Books.

== 1379 ==
=== 2 Ric. 2. Stat. 2 ===
The 3rd Parliament of King Richard II, which met from 24 April 1379 until 27 May 1379.

This session was also traditionally cited as 2 R. 2. Stat. 2 or 2 Rich. 2. Stat. 2.

- (Confirmation of liberties) c. 1 A confirmation of the liberties of the church. — repealed for England and Wales by Statute Law Revision Act 1863 (26 & 27 Vict. c. 125) and for Ireland by Statute Law (Ireland) Revision Act 1872 (35 & 36 Vict. c. 98)
- Riots Act 1379 c. 2 A repeal of the statute of 2 Rich. 2. stat. 1. cap. 6. (Note: Riots Act 1378 (2 Ric. 2. Stat. 1. c. 6)) touching riots. — repealed for England and Wales by Statute Law Revision Act 1863 (26 & 27 Vict. c. 125) and for Ireland by Statute Law (Ireland) Revision Act 1872 (35 & 36 Vict. c. 98)
- (Fraudulent deeds) c. 3 Fraudulent deeds made by debtors to avoid their creditors, shall be void. — repealed for England and Wales by Statute Law Revision Act 1863 (26 & 27 Vict. c. 125) and for Ireland by Statute Law (Ireland) Revision Act 1872 (35 & 36 Vict. c. 98)

==== Sources ====
- Chronological Table of and Index to the Statutes. Vol. 1: To the End of the Session 59 Vict. Sess. 2 (1895) (13th ed.). London: Her Majesty's Stationery Office. 1896. p. 29 – via Google Books.
- Chronological Table of the Statutes: Covering the Period from 1235 to the End of 1971. London: Her Majesty's Stationery Office. 1972. p. 24. ISBN 978-0-11-840096-1 – via Google Books.

=== 3 Ric. 2 ===
The 4th Parliament of King Richard II, which met from 16 January 1380 until 3 March 1380.

This session was also traditionally cited as 3 R. 2 or 3 Rich. 2.

- (Confirmation of liberties, etc.) c. 1 A confirmation of the laws of the church, and of the laws and statutes of the realm. — repealed for England and Wales by Statute Law Revision Act 1863 (26 & 27 Vict. c. 125) and for Ireland by Statute Law (Ireland) Revision Act 1872 (35 & 36 Vict. c. 98)
- Assize of Cloths Act 1379 c. 2 The penalty of the aulneger that setteth his seal to faulty cloths. — repealed for England and Wales by Statute Law Revision Act 1863 (26 & 27 Vict. c. 125) and for Ireland by Statute Law (Ireland) Revision Act 1872 (35 & 36 Vict. c. 98)
- Farming of Benefices for Aliens Act 1379 c. 3 None shall take any benefice of an alien, or convey money to him. — repealed by Statute Law Revision Act 1948 (11 & 12 Geo. 6. c. 62)

==== Sources ====
- Chronological Table of and Index to the Statutes. Vol. 1: To the End of the Session 59 Vict. Sess. 2 (1895) (13th ed.). London: Her Majesty's Stationery Office. 1896. p. 29 – via Google Books.
- Chronological Table of the Statutes: Covering the Period from 1235 to the End of 1971. London: Her Majesty's Stationery Office. 1972. p. 24. ISBN 978-0-11-840096-1 – via Google Books.

== 1380 (4 Ric. 2) ==
The 5th Parliament of King Richard II, which met at Northampton from 5 November 1380 until 6 December 1380.

This session was also traditionally cited as 4 R. 2 or 4 Rich. 2.

- (Gauging of vessels of wine, etc.) c. 1 All vessels of wine, honey, and oil brought into this realm shall be gauged.— repealed by Repeal of Acts Concerning Importation Act 1822 (3 Geo. 4. c. 41) and Weights and Measures Act 1824 (5 Geo. 4. c. 74)
- (Pardon) c. 2 The King's pardon of escapes and felons, and clerks convict. — repealed for England and Wales by Statute Law Revision Act 1863 (26 & 27 Vict. c. 125) and for Ireland by Statute Law (Ireland) Revision Act 1872 (35 & 36 Vict. c. 98)

=== Sources ===
- Chronological Table of and Index to the Statutes. Vol. 1: To the End of the Session 59 Vict. Sess. 2 (1895) (13th ed.). London: Her Majesty's Stationery Office. 1896. p. 29 – via Google Books.
- Chronological Table of the Statutes: Covering the Period from 1235 to the End of 1971. London: Her Majesty's Stationery Office. 1972. p. 24. ISBN 978-0-11-840096-1 – via Google Books.

== 1381 (5 Ric. 2. Stat. 1) ==
The 6th Parliament of King Richard II, which met from 3 November 1381 until 25 February 1382.

This session was also traditionally cited as 5 R. 2. Stat. 1 or 5 Rich. 2. Stat. 1.

- (Confirmation of liberties, charters and statutes) c. 1 A confirmation of the liberties of the church, and of all statutes made and not repealed.— repealed for England and Wales by Statute Law Revision Act 1863 (26 & 27 Vict. c. 125) and for Ireland by Statute Law (Ireland) Revision Act 1872 (35 & 36 Vict. c. 98)
- (Exportation of gold, silver, leaving the realm) c. 2 None shall transport gold or silver, nor depart out of the realm without licence.— repealed for England and Wales by Statute Law Revision Act 1863 (26 & 27 Vict. c. 125) and for Ireland by Statute Law (Ireland) Revision Act 1872 (35 & 36 Vict. c. 98)
- c. 3 None of the King's subjects shall carry forth nor bring any merchandises, but only in ships of the King's allegiance.— repealed by Repeal of Acts Concerning Importation Act 1822 (3 Geo. 4. c. 41)
- c. 4 The several prices of several sorts of wines to be sold in gross or by retail, and the forfeiture of those which do sell them dearer.— repealed for England and Wales by Statute Law Revision Act 1863 (26 & 27 Vict. c. 125) and for Ireland by Statute Law (Ireland) Revision Act 1872 (35 & 36 Vict. c. 98)
- c. 5 The King's pardon to those that repressed or took revenge of his rebels.— repealed for England and Wales by Statute Law Revision Act 1863 (26 & 27 Vict. c. 125) and for Ireland by Statute Law (Ireland) Revision Act 1872 (35 & 36 Vict. c. 98)
- Treason Act 1381 c. 6 Manumissions, releases, and other bonds made in the last tumult by compulsion, shall be void. It shall be treason to begin a riot, rout, or rumour. — repealed by Treason Act 1399 (1 Hen. 4. c. 10)
- Forcible Entry Act 1381 c. 7 The penalty where any doth enter into lands where it is not lawful, or with force. — repealed by Criminal Law Act 1977 (c. 45)
- c. 8 A remedy for them whose writings were destroyed in the late insurrection.— repealed for England and Wales by Statute Law Revision Act 1863 (26 & 27 Vict. c. 125) and for Ireland by Statute Law (Ireland) Revision Act 1872 (35 & 36 Vict. c. 98)
- c. 9 Every person that is impeached in the exchequer may plead in his own discharge.— repealed for England and Wales by Statute Law Revision Act 1863 (26 & 27 Vict. c. 125) and for Ireland by Statute Law (Ireland) Revision Act 1872 (35 & 36 Vict. c. 98)
- c. 10 The covenants of those that shall serve the King in his wars or embassies shall be put in writing, and sent into the exchequer.— repealed for England and Wales by Statute Law Revision Act 1863 (26 & 27 Vict. c. 125) and for Ireland by Statute Law (Ireland) Revision Act 1872 (35 & 36 Vict. c. 98)
- c. 11 The accompts in the exchequer shall be more speedily heard than they were wont.— repealed for England and Wales by Statute Law Revision Act 1863 (26 & 27 Vict. c. 125) and for Ireland by Statute Law (Ireland) Revision Act 1872 (35 & 36 Vict. c. 98)
- c. 12 Two clerks shall be assigned to make parcels of accompts in the exchequer.— repealed for England and Wales by Statute Law Revision Act 1863 (26 & 27 Vict. c. 125) and for Ireland by Statute Law (Ireland) Revision Act 1872 (35 & 36 Vict. c. 98)
- c. 13 Accompts of Nichil shall be put out of the exchequer. An accomptant discharged upon his oath.— repealed for England and Wales by Statute Law Revision Act 1863 (26 & 27 Vict. c. 125) and for Ireland by Statute Law (Ireland) Revision Act 1872 (35 & 36 Vict. c. 98)
- c. 14 The clerk of the pipe, &c., sworn for the entry of writs of the great and privy seal.— repealed for England and Wales by Statute Law Revision Act 1863 (26 & 27 Vict. c. 125) and for Ireland by Statute Law (Ireland) Revision Act 1872 (35 & 36 Vict. c. 98)
- c. 15 Upon a judgement of livery, the remembrancer shall cause the suit to cease.— repealed for England and Wales by Statute Law Revision Act 1863 (26 & 27 Vict. c. 125) and for Ireland by Statute Law (Ireland) Revision Act 1872 (35 & 36 Vict. c. 98)
- c. 16 The fees of the exchequer clerks for making commissions, or records of Nisi prius.— repealed for England and Wales by Statute Law Revision Act 1863 (26 & 27 Vict. c. 125) and for Ireland by Statute Law (Ireland) Revision Act 1872 (35 & 36 Vict. c. 98)

=== Sources ===
- Chronological Table of and Index to the Statutes. Vol. 1: To the End of the Session 59 Vict. Sess. 2 (1895) (13th ed.). London: Her Majesty's Stationery Office. 1896. p. 29 – via Google Books.
- Chronological Table of the Statutes: Covering the Period from 1235 to the End of 1971. London: Her Majesty's Stationery Office. 1972. p. 25. ISBN 978-0-11-840096-1 – via Google Books.

== 1382 ==
=== 5 Ric. 2. Stat. 2 ===
The 7th Parliament of King Richard II, which met at Westminster from 7 May 1382 until 22 May 1382.

This session was also traditionally cited as 5 R. 2. Stat. 2 or 5 Rich. 2. Stat. 2.

- (Merchant strangers) c. 1 Merchants strangers may come unto, continue, and depart forth of the realm. — repealed for England and Wales by Statute Law Revision Act 1863 (26 & 27 Vict. c. 125) and for Ireland by Statute Law (Ireland) Revision Act 1872 (35 & 36 Vict. c. 98)
- (Leather) c. 2 Woolfels and leather may be carried into any country by aliens or denizens, saving into France, until Michaelmas come twelvemonth. Certain money shall be abated to them that will pay their custom beforehand. — repealed for England and Wales by Statute Law Revision Act 1863 (26 & 27 Vict. c. 125) and for Ireland by Statute Law (Ireland) Revision Act 1872 (35 & 36 Vict. c. 98)
- (Subsidy) c. 3 A subsidy granted to the King, so that the money that cometh thereby may be wholly employed upon the keeping of the sea. — repealed for England and Wales by Statute Law Revision Act 1863 (26 & 27 Vict. c. 125) and for Ireland by Statute Law (Ireland) Revision Act 1872 (35 & 36 Vict. c. 98)
- Summons to Parliament Act 1382 c. 4 Every one to whom it belongeth, shall upon summons come to the parliament. —
  still in force
- Heresy Act 1382 c. 5 Sheriffs commissioned to apprehend preachers of heresy, and their abettors. The enormities ensuing the preaching of heresies. — repealed for England and Wales by Act of Supremacy 1558 (1 Eliz. 1. c. 1) and England and Wales by Statute Law Revision Act 1863 (26 & 27 Vict. c. 125) and for Ireland by Statute Law (Ireland) Revision Act 1872 (35 & 36 Vict. c. 98)

==== Sources ====
- Chronological Table of and Index to the Statutes. Vol. 1: To the End of the Session 59 Vict. Sess. 2 (1895) (13th ed.). London: Her Majesty's Stationery Office. 1896. p. 29 – via Google Books.
- Chronological Table of the Statutes: Covering the Period from 1235 to the End of 1971. London: Her Majesty's Stationery Office. 1972. p. 25. ISBN 978-0-11-840096-1 – via Google Books.
- "Acts of the English Parliament from 1382". legislation.gov.uk. The National Archives.

=== 6 Ric. 2. Stat. 1 ===
The 8th Parliament of King Richard II, which met from 6 October 1382 until 24 October 1382.

This session was also traditionally cited as 6 Ric. 2, 6 Ric. 2. St. 1, 6 Ric. 2. st. 1, 6 R. 2, 6 R. 2. Stat. 1, 6 R. 2. St. 1, 6 R. 2. st. 1, 6 Rich. 2 or 6 Rich. 2. Stat. 1.

- (Confirmation of liberties, charters and statutes) c. 1 A confirmation of the liberties of the church, and of all statutes not repealed. — repealed for England and Wales by Statute Law Revision Act 1863 (26 & 27 Vict. c. 125) and for Ireland by Statute Law (Ireland) Revision Act 1872 (35 & 36 Vict. c. 98)
- Venue Act 1382 (Venue in actions for debt) c. 2 Writs of debt, accompt, &c. shall be commenced in the counties where the contracts were made. — repealed by Civil Procedure Acts Repeal Act 1879 (42 & 43 Vict. c. 59)
- (Legal proceedings) c. 3 In which court writs of nusance called Vicountiels, shall be pursued. — repealed for England and Wales by Statute Law Revision Act 1863 (26 & 27 Vict. c. 125) and for Ireland by Statute Law (Ireland) Revision Act 1872 (35 & 36 Vict. c. 98)
- c. 4 Deeds enrolled that were destroyed in the late insurrection, exemplified, shall be of force. — repealed for England and Wales by Statute Law Revision Act 1863 (26 & 27 Vict. c. 125) and for Ireland by Statute Law (Ireland) Revision Act 1872 (35 & 36 Vict. c. 98)
- c. 5 Justices of assise, &c. shall hold their sessions in principal towns. — repealed for England and Wales by Statute Law Revision Act 1863 (26 & 27 Vict. c. 125) and for Ireland by Statute Law (Ireland) Revision Act 1872 (35 & 36 Vict. c. 98)
- (Rape) c. 6 The penalties of the man and woman, where a woman ravished doth consent. In an appeal of rape the defendant shall not wage battle. — repealed for England and Wales by Offences Against the Person Act 1828 (9 Geo. 4. c. 31), for Ireland by Offences Against the Person (Ireland) Act 1829 (10 Geo. 4. c. 34) and for India by Criminal Law (India) Act 1828 (9 Geo. 4. c. 74)
- c. 7 At what prices sweet wines may be sold. — repealed for England and Wales by Statute Law Revision Act 1863 (26 & 27 Vict. c. 125) and for Ireland by Statute Law (Ireland) Revision Act 1872 (35 & 36 Vict. c. 98)
- c. 8 Where no English ships are to be had, others may be used. — repealed by Repeal of Acts Concerning Importation Act 1822 (3 Geo. 4. c. 41)
- (Victuallers) c. 9 No victualler shall execute a judicial place in a city or town corporate. — repealed by Repeal of Obsolete Statutes Act 1856 (19 & 20 Vict. c. 64)
- c. 10 Aliens being in amity with the King, may bring in victuals, and sell them. — repealed by Repeal of Acts Concerning Importation Act 1822 (3 Geo. 4. c. 41)
- c. 11 Hosts in cities, towns, &c. shall not forestall fish or other victuals. Fishmongers in London may not buy fresh fish to sell again, except eels, &c. — repealed for England and Wales by Statute Law Revision Act 1863 (26 & 27 Vict. c. 125) and for Ireland by Statute Law (Ireland) Revision Act 1872 (35 & 36 Vict. c. 98)
- c. 12 All chief officers of towns corporate shall be sworn to observe the aforesaid ordinance touching fishmongers. — repealed for England and Wales by Statute Law Revision Act 1863 (26 & 27 Vict. c. 125) and for Ireland by Statute Law (Ireland) Revision Act 1872 (35 & 36 Vict. c. 98)
- c. 13 The King's pardon to his subjects after the late insurrection, with exceptions. — repealed for England and Wales by Statute Law Revision Act 1863 (26 & 27 Vict. c. 125) and for Ireland by Statute Law (Ireland) Revision Act 1872 (35 & 36 Vict. c. 98)

==== Sources ====
- Chronological Table of and Index to the Statutes. Vol. 1: To the End of the Session 59 Vict. Sess. 2 (1895) (13th ed.). London: Her Majesty's Stationery Office. 1896. p. 29 – via Google Books.
- Chronological Table of the Statutes: Covering the Period from 1235 to the End of 1971. London: Her Majesty's Stationery Office. 1972. p. 25. ISBN 978-0-11-840096-1 – via Google Books.

== 1383 ==
=== 6 Ric. 2. Stat. 2 ===
The 9th Parliament of King Richard II, which met from 23 February 1383 until 10 March 1383.

This session was also traditionally cited as 6 Ric. 2. St. 2, 6 Ric. 2. st. 2, 6 R. 2. Stat. 2, 6 R. 2. St. 2, 6 R. 2. st. 2 or 6 Rich. Stat. 2.

- (Pardon) c. 1 A more large pardon granted by the King to the offenders in the late insurrection, with few exceptions. — repealed for England and Wales by Statute Law Revision Act 1863 (26 & 27 Vict. c. 125) and for Ireland by Statute Law (Ireland) Revision Act 1872 (35 & 36 Vict. c. 98)
- (Purveyance) c. 2 Confirmation of the statutes of purveyors, &c. — repealed for England and Wales by Statute Law Revision Act 1863 (26 & 27 Vict. c. 125) and for Ireland by Statute Law (Ireland) Revision Act 1872 (35 & 36 Vict. c. 98)
- (Trespass) c. 3 They which can bring witnesses that they came to the insurrection compelled, shall be acquitted of trespasses. — repealed for England and Wales by Statute Law Revision Act 1863 (26 & 27 Vict. c. 125) and for Ireland by Statute Law (Ireland) Revision Act 1872 (35 & 36 Vict. c. 98)
- (Trespass) c. 4 Actions of trespass to be brought within a limited time. — repealed for England and Wales by Statute Law Revision Act 1863 (26 & 27 Vict. c. 125) and for Ireland by Statute Law (Ireland) Revision Act 1872 (35 & 36 Vict. c. 98)
- c. 5 The number of compurgators to prove the compulsion. — repealed for England and Wales by Statute Law Revision Act 1863 (26 & 27 Vict. c. 125) and for Ireland by Statute Law (Ireland) Revision Act 1872 (35 & 36 Vict. c. 98)

==== Sources ====
- Chronological Table of and Index to the Statutes. Vol. 1: To the End of the Session 59 Vict. Sess. 2 (1895) (13th ed.). London: Her Majesty's Stationery Office. 1896. p. 29 – via Google Books.
- Chronological Table of the Statutes: Covering the Period from 1235 to the End of 1971. London: Her Majesty's Stationery Office. 1972. p. 25. ISBN 978-0-11-840096-1 – via Google Books.

=== 7 Ric. 2 ===
The 10th Parliament of King Richard II, which met from 26 October 1383 until 26 November 1383.

This session was also traditionally cited as 7 R. 2 or 7 Rich. 2.

- (Confirmation of liberties) c. 1 A confirmation of the liberties of the church. — repealed for England and Wales by Statute Law Revision Act 1863 (26 & 27 Vict. c. 125) and for Ireland by Statute Law (Ireland) Revision Act 1872 (35 & 36 Vict. c. 98)
- (Confirmation of statutes) c. 2 A confirmation of all former statutes in force. — repealed for England and Wales by Statute Law Revision Act 1863 (26 & 27 Vict. c. 125) and for Ireland by Statute Law (Ireland) Revision Act 1872 (35 & 36 Vict. c. 98)
- (Forest) c. 3 For Tresspasses within the Forest Juries shall give their verdict where they received their Charge. — repealed by Statute Law Revision Act 1948 (11 & 12 Geo. 6. c. 62)
- (Forest) c. 4 Penalty on undue imprisonment by officers of the forest, &c. — repealed by Statute Law Revision Act 1948 (11 & 12 Geo. 6. c. 62)
- Vagabonds Act 1383 c. 5 Justices, &c. shall examine vagabonds, and bind them to their good abearing, or commit them to prison. — repealed for England and Wales by Continuance, etc. of Laws Act 1623 (21 Jas. 1. c. 28) and for Ireland by Statute Law (Ireland) Revision Act 1872 (35 & 36 Vict. c. 98)
- (Confirmation of Statute of Winchester) c. 6 — The statute of Winchester (Note: Statutum Wynton̄ (13 Edw. 1)) confirmed, and every sheriff shall proclaim it. — repealed for England and Wales by Statute Law Revision Act 1863 (26 & 27 Vict. c. 125) and for Ireland by Statute Law (Ireland) Revision Act 1872 (35 & 36 Vict. c. 98)
- (Jurors) c. 7 In what case a Nisi prius shall be granted at the suit of any of the jurors. — repealed for England and Wales by Juries Act 1825 (6 Geo. 4. c. 50) and for Ireland by Juries (Ireland) Act 1833 (3 & 4 Will. 4. c. 91)
- (Purveyance) c. 8 No subject's chator shall take any victuals or carriage without the owner's consent. — repealed for England and Wales by Statute Law Revision Act 1863 (26 & 27 Vict. c. 125) and for Ireland by Statute Law (Ireland) Revision Act 1872 (35 & 36 Vict. c. 98)
- (Cloths) c. 9 A confirmation of all statutes made against all deceits in cloths, aulnegers, &c. — repealed for England and Wales by Statute Law Revision Act 1863 (26 & 27 Vict. c. 125) and for Ireland by Statute Law (Ireland) Revision Act 1872 (35 & 36 Vict. c. 98)
- (Real actions) c. 10 Where an assise shall be taken of rents issuing forth of lands in divers counties. — repealed for England and Wales by Statute Law Revision Act 1863 (26 & 27 Vict. c. 125) and for Ireland by Statute Law (Ireland) Revision Act 1872 (35 & 36 Vict. c. 98)
- (Repeal of certain statutes) c. 11 A repeal of the statutes 5 Rich. II. (Note: 5 Ric. 2 c. 4) and 6 Rich. II. (Note: 6 Ric. 2 Stat. 1. c. 11) touching victuallers of London. — repealed for England and Wales by Statute Law Revision Act 1863 (26 & 27 Vict. c. 125) and for Ireland by Statute Law (Ireland) Revision Act 1872 (35 & 36 Vict. c. 98)
- (Holding of benefices by aliens) c. 12 No alien shall purchase or occupy any benefice of the church within this realm. — repealed by Statute Law Revision Act 1948 (11 & 12 Geo. 6. c. 62)
- (Riding armed) c. 13 No man shall ride in harness within the realm, nor with launcegaies. — repealed by Repeal of Obsolete Statutes Act 1856 (19 & 20 Vict. c. 64)
- (Attorneys in writs of premunire) c. 14 They which shall depart the realm by the King's licence, may make general attornies. — repealed by Civil Procedure Acts Repeal Act 1879 (42 & 43 Vict. c. 59)
- (Maintenance, etc.) c. 15 A confirmation of certain statutes made against maintenance and champerty. — repealed by Criminal Law Act 1967 (c. 58)
- (Exportation to Scotland) c. 16 No armour or victual shall be sent into Scotland without the King's licence, upon pain of forfeiture thereof. — repealed for England and Wales by Statute Law Revision Act 1863 (26 & 27 Vict. c. 125) and for Ireland by Statute Law (Ireland) Revision Act 1872 (35 & 36 Vict. c. 98)
- (Mainpernors) c. 17 The mainpernors shall satisfy the plaintiff for his delay, where the defendant keepeth not his day. — repealed for England and Wales by Statute Law Revision Act 1863 (26 & 27 Vict. c. 125) and for Ireland by Statute Law (Ireland) Revision Act 1872 (35 & 36 Vict. c. 98)

==== Sources ====
- Chronological Table of and Index to the Statutes. Vol. 1: To the End of the Session 59 Vict. Sess. 2 (1895) (13th ed.). London: Her Majesty's Stationery Office. 1896. pp. 29–30 – via Google Books.
- Chronological Table of the Statutes: Covering the Period from 1235 to the End of 1971. London: Her Majesty's Stationery Office. 1972. p. 25. ISBN 978-0-11-840096-1 – via Google Books.

== 1384 (8 Ric. 2) ==
The 11th Parliament of King Richard II, which met at Salisbury from 29 April 1384 until 27 May 1384.

This session was also traditionally cited as 8 R. 2 or 8 Rich. 2.

- (Confirmation of liberties, etc.) c. 1 A confirmation of the liberties of the church, and of all statutes not repealed. — repealed by Statute Law Revision and Civil Procedure Act 1881 (44 & 45 Vict. c. 59)
- Justices of Assize, etc. Act 1384 c. 2 No man of law shall be justice of assise, or gaol-delivery, in his own country. — repealed by Statute Law Revision and Civil Procedure Act 1881 (44 & 45 Vict. c. 59)
- (Administration of justice) c. 3 None of the justices or barons shall take any fee or reward but of the King, nor shall give counsel where the King is party, or in any suit depending before them. — repealed by 9 Ric. 2. c. 1
- (False entries of pleas, etc.) The penalty if a judge or clerk make a false entry, rase a roll, or change a verdict. c. 4 — repealed for England and Wales by Statute Law Revision and Civil Procedure Act 1881 (44 & 45 Vict. c. 59) and for Scotland and Northern Ireland by Statute Law Revision Act 1950 (14 Geo. 6. c. 6)
- (Jurisdiction of constable and marshal) What suit shall by discussed before the constable and marshal of England. c. 5 — repealed by Civil Procedure Acts Repeal Act 1879 (42 & 43 Vict. c. 59)

=== Sources ===
- Chronological Table of and Index to the Statutes. Vol. 1: To the End of the Session 59 Vict. Sess. 2 (1895) (13th ed.). London: Her Majesty's Stationery Office. 1896. p. 30 – via Google Books.
- Chronological Table of the Statutes: Covering the Period from 1235 to the End of 1971. London: Her Majesty's Stationery Office. 1972. p. 25. ISBN 978-0-11-840096-1 – via Google Books.

== 1385 (9 Ric. 2) ==
The 12th Parliament of King Richard II, which met from 12 November 1384 until 14 December 1384.

This session was also traditionally cited as 9 R. 2 or 9 Rich. 2.

- (Confirmation of statutes) c. 1 A confirmation of all statutes not repealed, saving of the statute of 8 Rich. II. c. 3. (Note: 8 Ric. 2. c. 3) — repealed for England and Wales by Statute Law Revision Act 1863 (26 & 27 Vict. c. 125) and for Ireland by Statute Law (Ireland) Revision Act 1872 (35 & 36 Vict. c. 98)
- (Legal proceedings) c. 2 Villains flying into places enfranchised, and suing their lords, shall not bar thereby. — repealed for England and Wales by Statute Law Revision Act 1863 (26 & 27 Vict. c. 125) and for Ireland by Statute Law (Ireland) Revision Act 1872 (35 & 36 Vict. c. 98)
- (Legal proceedings) c. 3 A writ of error or attaint maintainable by him in the reversion. — repealed for England and Wales by Statute Law Revision Act 1863 (26 & 27 Vict. c. 125) and for Ireland by Statute Law (Ireland) Revision Act 1872 (35 & 36 Vict. c. 98)
- (Legal proceedings) c. 4 Whether a prior be dative and removable, or perpetual, the trial shall be by the ordinary. — repealed for England and Wales by Statute Law Revision Act 1863 (26 & 27 Vict. c. 125) and for Ireland by Statute Law (Ireland) Revision Act 1872 (35 & 36 Vict. c. 98)
- (Marshalsea) c. 5 The fees of priests taken in the marshalsea of the King's house. — repealed for England and Wales by Statute Law Revision Act 1863 (26 & 27 Vict. c. 125) and for Ireland by Statute Law (Ireland) Revision Act 1872 (35 & 36 Vict. c. 98)

=== Sources ===
- Chronological Table of and Index to the Statutes. Vol. 1: To the End of the Session 59 Vict. Sess. 2 (1895) (13th ed.). London: Her Majesty's Stationery Office. 1896. p. 30 – via Google Books.
- Chronological Table of the Statutes: Covering the Period from 1235 to the End of 1971. London: Her Majesty's Stationery Office. 1972. p. 25. ISBN 978-0-11-840096-1 – via Google Books.

== 1386 (10 Ric. 2) ==
The 14th Parliament of King Richard II (the 'Wonderful Parliament'), which met from 1 October 1386 until 28 November 1386.

This session was also traditionally cited as 10 R. 2 or 10 Rich. 2.

- (Commission of inquiry into courts, etc.) c. 1 The King's commission to the chancellor and other to examine into the state of his courts, revenues, grants, and officers fees. — repealed for England and Wales by Statute Law Revision Act 1863 (26 & 27 Vict. c. 125) and for Ireland by Statute Law (Ireland) Revision Act 1872 (35 & 36 Vict. c. 98)

=== Sources ===
- Chronological Table of and Index to the Statutes. Vol. 1: To the End of the Session 59 Vict. Sess. 2 (1895) (13th ed.). London: Her Majesty's Stationery Office. 1896. p. 30 – via Google Books.
- Chronological Table of the Statutes: Covering the Period from 1235 to the End of 1971. London: Her Majesty's Stationery Office. 1972. p. 25. ISBN 978-0-11-840096-1 – via Google Books.

== 1387 (11 Ric. 2) ==
The 15th Parliament of King Richard II (the 'Merciless Parliament'), which met from 3 February 1388 until 4 June 1388.

This session was also traditionally cited as 11 R. 2 or 11 Rich. 2.

- (Confirmation of 10 Ric. 2, indemnity, etc.) cc. 1–11
  - c. 1 The archbishop of York and others attainted of high treason. — repealed for England and Wales by Statute Law Revision Act 1863 (26 & 27 Vict. c. 125) and for Ireland by Statute Law (Ireland) Revision Act 1872 (35 & 36 Vict. c. 98)
  - c. 2 Clause to prevent fraudulent conveyances of their estates. — repealed for England and Wales by Statute Law Revision Act 1863 (26 & 27 Vict. c. 125) and for Ireland by Statute Law (Ireland) Revision Act 1872 (35 & 36 Vict. c. 98)
  - c. 3 The estates of the bishop of Chichester and others also forfeited. — repealed for England and Wales by Statute Law Revision Act 1863 (26 & 27 Vict. c. 125) and for Ireland by Statute Law (Ireland) Revision Act 1872 (35 & 36 Vict. c. 98)
  - c. 4 The penalty of concealing any part of the said estates after proclamation made. Estates possessed by a traitor in another's right excepted. — repealed for England and Wales by Statute Law Revision Act 1863 (26 & 27 Vict. c. 125) and for Ireland by Statute Law (Ireland) Revision Act 1872 (35 & 36 Vict. c. 98)
  - c. 5 Issues in tail, and jointures of women, also excepted. — repealedrepealed for England and Wales by Statute Law Revision Act 1863 (26 & 27 Vict. c. 125) and for Ireland by Statute Law (Ireland) Revision Act 1872 (35 & 36 Vict. c. 98)
  - c. 6 Penalty of petitioning the King for any grant of the said estates during the war. — repealed for England and Wales by Statute Law Revision Act 1863 (26 & 27 Vict. c. 125) and for Ireland by Statute Law (Ireland) Revision Act 1872 (35 & 36 Vict. c. 98)
  - c. 7 All merchants aliens and denizens may buy and sell within this realm without interruption. — repealed for England and Wales by Statute Law Revision Act 1863 (26 & 27 Vict. c. 125) and for Ireland by Statute Law (Ireland) Revision Act 1872 (35 & 36 Vict. c. 98)
  - c. 8 Certain annuities granted by the King, his father and grandfather, made void. — repealed for England and Wales by Statute Law Revision Act 1863 (26 & 27 Vict. c. 125) and for Ireland by Statute Law (Ireland) Revision Act 1872 (35 & 36 Vict. c. 98)
  - c. 9 No new imposition shall be put upon merchandises. — repealed for England and Wales by Statute Law Revision Act 1863 (26 & 27 Vict. c. 125) and for Ireland by Statute Law (Ireland) Revision Act 1872 (35 & 36 Vict. c. 98)
  - (Crown) c. 10 The King's signet or privy seal shall not be sent in disturbance of the law. — repealed by Statute Law Revision and Civil Procedure Act 1881 (44 & 45 Vict. c. 59)
  - c. 11 The keeping of assises in good towns, referred to the consideration of the chancellor and justices, &c. — repealed for England and Wales by Statute Law Revision Act 1863 (26 & 27 Vict. c. 125) and for Ireland by Statute Law (Ireland) Revision Act 1872 (35 & 36 Vict. c. 98)

=== Sources ===
- Chronological Table of and Index to the Statutes. Vol. 1: To the End of the Session 59 Vict. Sess. 2 (1895) (13th ed.). London: Her Majesty's Stationery Office. 1896. p. 30 – via Google Books.
- Chronological Table of the Statutes: Covering the Period from 1235 to the End of 1971. London: Her Majesty's Stationery Office. 1972. p. 25. ISBN 978-0-11-840096-1 – via Google Books.

== 1388 (12 Ric. 2) ==
The 16th Parliament of King Richard II, which met at Cambridge from 9 September 1388 until 17 October 1388.

This session was also traditionally cited as 12 R. 2 or 12 Rich. 2.

- (Confirmation of liberties, etc.) c. 1 A confirmation of the liberties of the church, and of all former statutes not repealed. — repealed for England and Wales by Statute Law Revision Act 1863 (26 & 27 Vict. c. 125) and for Ireland by Statute Law (Ireland) Revision Act 1872 (35 & 36 Vict. c. 98)
- (Corrupt appointments to offices) c. 2 None shall obtain offices by suit or for reward, but upon desert. — repealed by Promissory Oaths Act 1871 (34 & 35 Vict. c. 48)
- Statute of Cambridge 1388 cc. 3–9
  - c. 3 No servant shall depart from one hunted to another, without a testimonial under the King's seal, on pain of being set in the stocks. — repealed for England and Wales by Continuance, etc. of Laws Act 1623 (21 Jas. 1. c. 28) and for Ireland by Statute Law (Ireland) Revision Act 1872 (35 & 36 Vict. c. 98)
  - c. 4 The several penalties for giving or taking more wages than is limited statute. — repealed for England and Wales by Continuance, etc. of Laws Act 1623 (21 Jas. 1. c. 28) and for Ireland by Statute Law (Ireland) Revision Act 1872 (35 & 36 Vict. c. 98)
  - c. 5 Whosoever serveth in husbandry until twelve years old, shall so continue. — repealed for England and Wales by Continuance, etc. of Laws Act 1623 (21 Jas. 1. c. 28) and for Ireland by Statute Law (Ireland) Revision Act 1872 (35 & 36 Vict. c. 98)
  - c. 6 No servants in husbandry, or labourer, shall wear any sword, buckler, or dagger. Unlawful games prohibited. — repealed for England and Wales by Continuance, etc. of Laws Act 1623 (21 Jas. 1. c. 28) and for Ireland by Statute Law (Ireland) Revision Act 1872 (35 & 36 Vict. c. 98)
  - c. 7 The punishment of beggars able to serve, and a provision for impotent beggars. — repealed for England and Wales by Continuance, etc. of Laws Act 1623 (21 Jas. 1. c. 28) and for Ireland by Statute Law (Ireland) Revision Act 1872 (35 & 36 Vict. c. 98)
  - c. 8 Travellers reporting they have been imprisoned beyond sea shall produce testimonials. — repealed for England and Wales by Continuance, etc. of Laws Act 1623 (21 Jas. 1. c. 28) and for Ireland by Statute Law (Ireland) Revision Act 1872 (35 & 36 Vict. c. 98)
  - c. 9 The statute of labourers shall be executed within cities and boroughs. — repealed for England and Wales by Continuance, etc. of Laws Act 1623 (21 Jas. 1. c. 28) and for Ireland by Statute Law (Ireland) Revision Act 1872 (35 & 36 Vict. c. 98)
- Justices of the Peace Quarter Sessions Act 1388 c. 10 How many justices of peace there shall be in every county, and how often they shall keep their sessions. — repealed for England and Wales by Criminal Justice Act 1855 (18 & 19 Vict. c. 126) and Statute Law Revision and Civil Procedure Act 1881 (44 & 45 Vict. c. 59) and for England and Wales and Northern Ireland by Statute Law Revision Act 1948 (11 & 12 Geo. 6. c. 62) and Criminal Justice Administration Act 1962 (10 & 11 Eliz. 2. c. 15)
- (Penalty for slandering great men) c. 11 The punishment of him that telleth lies of the peers or greet officers of the realm. — repealed by Statute Law Revision Act 1887 (50 & 51 Vict. c. 59)
- (Expenses of knights of shires) c. 12 In what cases the lords and spiritual persons shall be contributory to the expences of the knights of parliament. — repealed by Repeal of Obsolete Statutes Act 1856 (19 & 20 Vict. c. 64)
- Nuisances in Towns Act 1388 c. 13 The punishment of them which cause corruption near a city or great town to corrupt the air. — repealed by Repeal of Obsolete Statutes Act 1856 (19 & 20 Vict. c. 64)
- (Cloths) c. 14 A confirmation of the statute of 47 Edw. III. cap. 1. touching the length and breadth of cloths. — repealed for England and Wales by Statute Law Revision Act 1863 (26 & 27 Vict. c. 125) and for Ireland by Statute Law (Ireland) Revision Act 1872 (35 & 36 Vict. c. 98)
- (Provisors of benefices) c. 15 He that will go out of the realm to provide a benefice within the realm, shall be out of the King's protection, and the benefice shall be void. — repealed by Statute Law Revision Act 1948 (11 & 12 Geo. 6. c. 62)
- (The staple) c. 16 The staple shall he removed from Middleburgh to Calais. — repealed by Repeal of Acts Concerning Importation Act 1822 (3 Geo. 4. c. 41)

=== Sources ===
- Chronological Table of and Index to the Statutes. Vol. 1: To the End of the Session 59 Vict. Sess. 2 (1895) (13th ed.). London: Her Majesty's Stationery Office. 1896. p. 30 – via Google Books.
- Chronological Table of the Statutes: Covering the Period from 1235 to the End of 1971. London: Her Majesty's Stationery Office. 1972. pp. 25–26. ISBN 978-0-11-840096-1 – via Google Books.

== 1389 (13 Ric. 2) ==
The 17th Parliament of King Richard II, which met from 17 January 1390 until 2 March 1390.

This session was also traditionally cited as 13 R. 2 or 13 Rich. 2.

=== 13 Ric. 2. Stat. 1 ===
This session was also traditionally cited as 13 Ric. 2. stat. 1, 13 Rich. 2. Stat. 1, 13 Rich. 2. stat. 1, 13 R. 2. Stat. 1 or 13 R. 2. stat. 1.

- (King's presentation to benefice) c. 1 The King's presentee shall not be received to a church full of an incumbent, until he hath recovered it by law. — repealed by Statute Law Revision Act 1948 (11 & 12 Geo. 6. c. 62), for Northern Ireland by Statute Law Revision Act 1950 (14 Geo. 6. c. 6) and for England and Wales by Statute Law (Repeals) Act 1969 (c. 52)
- Jurisdiction of Constable and Marshal Act 1389 c. 2 The authority of the constable of England, and the remedy where it is abused. — repealed by Civil Procedure Acts Repeal Act 1879 (42 & 43 Vict. c. 59)
- Court of Marshalsea Act 1389 c. 3 The limits of the steward's and marshal's court of the King's house. — repealed for England and Wales by Statute Law Revision Act 1863 (26 & 27 Vict. c. 125) and for Ireland by Statute Law (Ireland) Revision Act 1872 (35 & 36 Vict. c. 98)
- (Clerk of market of King's house) c. 4 The duty of a clerk of the market of the King^s house. — repealed by Statute Law Revision and Civil Procedure Act 1881 (44 & 45 Vict. c. 59)
- (Jurisdiction of admiral and deputy) c. 5 With what things the admiral and his deputy shall meddle. — repealed by Civil Procedure Acts Repeal Act 1879 (42 & 43 Vict. c. 59)
- Sergeants at Arms Act 1389 c. 6 How many serjeants at arms there shall be, and with what things they shall meddle. — repealed for England and Wales by Statute Law Revision Act 1863 (26 & 27 Vict. c. 125) and for Ireland by Statute Law (Ireland) Revision Act 1872 (35 & 36 Vict. c. 98)
- Justices of the Peace Act 1389 c. 7 What sort of persons shall be justices of peace, and what their charge is to do. — repealed by Statute Law Revision and Civil Procedure Act 1881 (44 & 45 Vict. c. 59)
- Statute of Victuallers and Hostellers 1389 c. 8 The rates of labourers wages shall be assessed and proclaimed by the justices of peace, and they shall assess the gains of victuallers. Who shall make horsebread, and the weight and price thereof. — repealed by Forestalling, Regrating, etc. Act 1844 (7 & 8 Vict. c. 24)
- Weights and Measures Act 1389 c. 9 There shall be but one weight and measure throughout the realm, saving in the county of Lancaster. The weight of wool, and the refuse thereof. — repealed for England and Wales by Statute Law Revision Act 1863 (26 & 27 Vict. c. 125) and for Ireland by Statute Law (Ireland) Revision Act 1872 (35 & 36 Vict. c. 98)
- (Cloths) c. 10 The length and breadth of Cogware and Kendal cloth. — repealed for England and Wales by Statute Law Revision Act 1863 (26 & 27 Vict. c. 125) and for Ireland by Statute Law (Ireland) Revision Act 1872 (35 & 36 Vict. c. 98)
- (Cloths) c. 11 The cloths of certain counties tacked and folded shall not be put to sale before they be opened. — repealed for England and Wales by Woollen Manufacture Act 1809 (49 Geo. 3. c. 109) and for Ireland by Statute Law (Ireland) Revision Act 1872 (35 & 36 Vict. c. 98)
- (Tanners) c. 12 No shoemaker shall be a tanner, nor tanner a shoemaker. — repealed for England and Wales by Statute Law Revision Act 1863 (26 & 27 Vict. c. 125) and for Ireland by Statute Law (Ireland) Revision Act 1872 (35 & 36 Vict. c. 98)
- (Keeping of dogs to hunt, etc.) c. 13 None shall hunt but they which have a sufficient living. — repealed for England and Wales by Game Act 1831 (1 & 2 Will. 4. c. 32) and for Ireland by Statute Law (Ireland) Revision Act 1872 (35 & 36 Vict. c. 98)
- (Bonds to the Crown) c. 14 There shall he no bonds of the double made in the exchequer for the King's debt. — repealed for England and Wales by Statute Law Revision Act 1863 (26 & 27 Vict. c. 125) and for Ireland by Statute Law (Ireland) Revision Act 1872 (35 & 36 Vict. c. 98)
- (Uniting of castles and gaols to counties) c. 15 The King's castles and gaols shall he rejoined to the bodies of counties. — repealed for England and Wales by Statute Law Revision Act 1863 (26 & 27 Vict. c. 125) and for Ireland by Statute Law (Ireland) Revision Act 1872 (35 & 36 Vict. c. 98)
- (Protections) c. 16 In what case a protection Quia profecturus, or Quia moraturus, is not allowable. — repealed for England and Wales by Statute Law Revision Act 1863 (26 & 27 Vict. c. 125) and for Ireland by Statute Law (Ireland) Revision Act 1872 (35 & 36 Vict. c. 98)
- (Real actions) c. 17 Where be in the reversion may be received in a suit commenced against the particular tenant. — repealed for England and Wales by Statute Law Revision Act 1863 (26 & 27 Vict. c. 125) and for Ireland by Statute Law (Ireland) Revision Act 1872 (35 & 36 Vict. c. 98)
- (Attaints) c. 18 In which courts an attaint may be brought upon a false verdict given in Lincoln. — repealed for England and Wales by Statute Law Revision Act 1863 (26 & 27 Vict. c. 125) and for Ireland by Statute Law (Ireland) Revision Act 1872 (35 & 36 Vict. c. 98)
- Fish Act 1389 c. 19 A confirmation of stat. 13 Edw. I. stat. 1. cap. 47, touching taking of salmons. — repealed for England and Wales by Salmon Fishery Act 1861 (24 & 25 Vict. c. 109)
- (Going beyond sea) c. 20 What sort of persons only may pass forth of the realm without the King's licence, and at what ports. — repealed for England and Wales by Statute Law Revision Act 1863 (26 & 27 Vict. c. 125) and for Ireland by Statute Law (Ireland) Revision Act 1872 (35 & 36 Vict. c. 98)

=== 13 Ric. 2. Stat. 2 ===
This session was also traditionally cited as 13 Ric. 2. stat. 2, 13 Rich. 2. Stat. 2, 13 Rich. 2. stat. 2, 13 R. 2. Stat. 2 or 13 R. 2. stat. 2.

- (Pardon of offences) c. 1 In a pardon of murder, treason, or rape, the offence committed shall be specified. The forfeiture of him at whole suit such a pardon is obtained. — repealed by 16 Ric. 2. c. 6 and Statute Law Revision Act 1948 (11 & 12 Geo. 6. c. 62)
- (Enforcement of the Statute of Provisors) c. 2 A confirmation of the statute of provisors, made Anno 25 Edw. 3. stat. 6. (Note: De provisoribus (25 Edw. 3. Stat. 4)) and the forfeiture of him that accepteth a benefice contrary to that statute. — repealed by Statute Law Revision Act 1948 (11 & 12 Geo. 6. c. 62)
- (Enforcement of the Statute of Provisors) c. 3 The penalty of him which bringeth a summons or excommunication against any person upon the statute of provisors, and of a prelate executing it. — repealed by Statute Law Revision Act 1948 (11 & 12 Geo. 6. c. 62)

=== 13 Ric. 2. Stat. 3 ===
This session was also traditionally cited as 13 Ric. 2. stat. 3, 13 Rich. 2. Stat. 3, 13 Rich. 2. stat. 3, 13 R. 2. Stat. 3 or 13 R. 2. stat. 3.

- (Maintenance) To prevent maintenance in Judicial proceedings. — repealed for England and Wales by Statute Law Revision Act 1863 (26 & 27 Vict. c. 125) and for Ireland by Statute Law (Ireland) Revision Act 1872 (35 & 36 Vict. c. 98)

=== Sources ===
- Chronological Table of and Index to the Statutes. Vol. 1: To the End of the Session 59 Vict. Sess. 2 (1895) (13th ed.). London: Her Majesty's Stationery Office. 1896. p. 30 – via Google Books.
- Chronological Table of the Statutes: Covering the Period from 1235 to the End of 1971. London: Her Majesty's Stationery Office. 1972. p. 26. ISBN 978-0-11-840096-1 – via Google Books.

== 1390 (14 Ric. 2) ==
The 18th Parliament of King Richard II, which met from 12 November 1390 until 3 December 1390.

This session was also traditionally cited as 14 R. 2 or 14 Rich. 2.

- (The staple) c. 1 The staple shall be removed from Calais into England. Every alien merchant shall bestow half the money received upon the commodities of this realm. — repealed by Repeal of Acts Concerning Importation Act 1822 (3 Geo. 4. c. 41)
- (Trading) c. 2 Upon exchanges by aliens, other commodities of the realm shall be bought. — repealed by Repeal of Acts Concerning Importation Act 1822 (3 Geo. 4. c. 41)
- (The staple) c. 3 Officers of the staple shall be first sworn to the King, and then to the staple. — repealed by Repeal of Acts Concerning Importation Act 1822 (3 Geo. 4. c. 41)
- (Trading) c. 4 Of whom denizens may buy wools, and where; but they shall not regrate them. — repealed for England and Wales by Continuance, etc. of Laws Act 1623 (21 Jas. 1. c. 28) and for Ireland by Statute Law (Ireland) Revision Act 1872 (35 & 36 Vict. c. 98)
- (Trading) c. 5 No denizen shall transport any merchandise of the staple forth of the realm. — repealed by Repeal of Acts Concerning Importation Act 1822 (3 Geo. 4. c. 41)
- (Trading) c. 6 English merchants shall freight only in English ships. — repealed by Repeal of Acts Concerning Importation Act 1822 (3 Geo. 4. c. 41)
- (Customs) c. 7 Tin shall pass forth of the realm only at Dartmouth. — repealed for England and Wales by Continuance, etc. of Laws Act 1623 (21 Jas. 1. c. 28) and for Ireland by Statute Law (Ireland) Revision Act 1872 (35 & 36 Vict. c. 98)
- (Customs) c. 8 No person shall be impeached for not gauging of Rhenish wine. — repealed for England and Wales by Statute Law Revision Act 1863 (26 & 27 Vict. c. 125) and for Ireland by Statute Law (Ireland) Revision Act 1872 (35 & 36 Vict. c. 98)
- (Trading) c. 9 Merchants strangers resorting into this realm shall be well used. — repealed for England and Wales by Statute Law Revision Act 1863 (26 & 27 Vict. c. 125) and for Ireland by Statute Law (Ireland) Revision Act 1872 (35 & 36 Vict. c. 98)
- (Customs) c. 10 No customer or comptroller shall have any ship of his own, and he shall have his office at the King's pleasure. — repealed for England and Wales by Statute Law Revision Act 1863 (26 & 27 Vict. c. 125) and for Ireland by Statute Law (Ireland) Revision Act 1872 (35 & 36 Vict. c. 98)
- Justice of the Peace Act 1390 c. 11 In every county there shall be eight justices of peace, estreats and wages. — repealed by Criminal Justice Act 1855 (18 & 19 Vict. c. 126) and Statute Law Revision Act 1948 (11 & 12 Geo. 6. c. 62)
- (Money) c. 12 The value of Scottish money of several sorts. — repealed for England and Wales by Statute Law Revision Act 1863 (26 & 27 Vict. c. 125) and for Ireland by Statute Law (Ireland) Revision Act 1872 (35 & 36 Vict. c. 98)

=== Sources ===
- Chronological Table of and Index to the Statutes. Vol. 1: To the End of the Session 59 Vict. Sess. 2 (1895) (13th ed.). London: Her Majesty's Stationery Office. 1896. p. 30 – via Google Books.
- Chronological Table of the Statutes: Covering the Period from 1235 to the End of 1971. London: Her Majesty's Stationery Office. 1972. p. 26. ISBN 978-0-11-840096-1 – via Google Books.

== 1391 (15 Ric. 2) ==
The 19th Parliament of King Richard II, which met from 3 November 1391 until 2 December 1391.

This statute says that it was made at Westminster on the morrow after All Souls' Day in 1391.

This session was also traditionally cited as 15 R. 2 or 15 Rich. 2.

- (Confirmation of statutes) c. 1 A confirmation of all former good statutes not repealed. — repealed for England and Wales by Statute Law Revision Act 1863 (26 & 27 Vict. c. 125) and for Ireland by Statute Law (Ireland) Revision Act 1872 (35 & 36 Vict. c. 98)
- Forcible Entry Act 1391 c. 2 The duty of justices of peace when any forcible entry is made into lands .— repealed by Criminal Law Act 1977 (c. 45)
- Admiralty Jurisdiction Act 1391 c. 3 In what places the admiral's jurisdiction doth lie. — repealed by Civil Procedure Acts Repeal Act 1879 (42 & 43 Vict. c. 59) and Criminal Law Act 1967 (c. 58)
- (Measures) c. 4 There shall be but eight bushels of corn striked io the quarter. — repealed for England and Wales by Statute Law Revision Act 1863 (26 & 27 Vict. c. 125) and for Ireland by Statute Law (Ireland) Revision Act 1872 (35 & 36 Vict. c. 98)
- Mortmain Act 1391 c. 5 Assurance of lands to certain places, persons, and uses, shall be adjudged Mortmain. — repealed by Mortmain and Charitable Uses Act 1888 (51 & 52 Vict. c. 42)
- (Appropriation of benefices) c. 6 In appropriation of benefices there shall be provision made for the poor and the vicar. — repealed for Northern Ireland by Statute Law Revision Act 1950 (14 Geo. 6. c. 6) and for England and Wales by Statute Law (Repeals) Act 1969 (c. 52)
- (Exportation) c. 7 Armour, corn, or victual, may he carried to Berwick. — repealed for England and Wales by Statute Law Revision Act 1863 (26 & 27 Vict. c. 125) and for Ireland by Statute Law (Ireland) Revision Act 1872 (35 & 36 Vict. c. 98)
- (Exportation) c. 8 A repeal of the statute of 14 Rich. 2. c. 7. touching the carrying of tin forth out of the realm at Dartmouth only. — repealed for England and Wales by Continuance, etc. of Laws Act 1623 (21 Jas. 1. c. 28) and for Ireland by Statute Law (Ireland) Revision Act 1872 (35 & 36 Vict. c. 98)
- (The staple) c. 9 The mayor of the staple shall take recognizances for debts, &c. according to the statute of 27 Edw. 3. stat. 2. cap. 9. — repealed for England and Wales by Statute Law Revision Act 1863 (26 & 27 Vict. c. 125) and for Ireland by Statute Law (Ireland) Revision Act 1872 (35 & 36 Vict. c. 98)
- (Cloths) c. 10 None shall buy Guilford clothes before they be fulled and manufactured as their ought to be. — repealed for England and Wales by Statute Law Revision Act 1863 (26 & 27 Vict. c. 125) and for Ireland by Statute Law (Ireland) Revision Act 1872 (35 & 36 Vict. c. 98)
- (Girdlers) c. 11 Girdlers may work their girdles with white metal. — repealed for England and Wales by Continuance, etc. of Laws Act 1603 (1 Jas. 1. c. 25) and for Ireland by Statute Law (Ireland) Revision Act 1872 (35 & 36 Vict. c. 98)
- (Private courts) c. 12 No man shall be compelled to answer for his freehold before the council of any lord. — repealed for England and Wales by Statute Law Revision Act 1863 (26 & 27 Vict. c. 125) and for Ireland by Statute Law (Ireland) Revision Act 1872 (35 & 36 Vict. c. 98)

=== Sources ===
- Chronological Table of and Index to the Statutes. Vol. 1: To the End of the Session 59 Vict. Sess. 2 (1895) (13th ed.). London: Her Majesty's Stationery Office. 1896. p. 31 – via Google Books.
- Chronological Table of the Statutes: Covering the Period from 1235 to the End of 1971. London: Her Majesty's Stationery Office. 1972. p. 26. ISBN 978-0-11-840096-1 – via Google Books.

== 1392 (16 Ric. 2) ==
The 20th Parliament of King Richard II, which met from 20 January 1393 until 10 February 1393.

This session was also traditionally cited as 16 R. 2 or 16 Rich. 2.

- Trade Act 1392 c. 1 No merchant stranger shall buy or sell with another merchant stranger to sell again. — repealed for England and Wales by Statute Law Revision Act 1863 (26 & 27 Vict. c. 125) and for Ireland by Statute Law (Ireland) Revision Act 1872 (35 & 36 Vict. c. 98)
- (Confirmation, etc. of 15 Ric. 2 c. 12) c. 2 The forfeiture of him that compelleth any person to answer for his freehold. — repealed for England and Wales by Statute Law Revision Act 1863 (26 & 27 Vict. c. 125) and for Ireland by Statute Law (Ireland) Revision Act 1872 (35 & 36 Vict. c. 98)
- Weights and Measures Act 1392 c. 3 The clerk of the market shall carry with him all his weights and measures signed. — repealed for England and Wales by Statute Law Revision Act 1863 (26 & 27 Vict. c. 125) and for Ireland by Statute Law (Ireland) Revision Act 1872 (35 & 36 Vict. c. 98)
- (Liveries) c. 4 Who only may wear another's livery. — repealed for England and Wales by Continuance of Laws, etc. Act 1627 (3 Cha. 1. c. 5) and for Ireland by Statute Law (Ireland) Revision Act 1872 (35 & 36 Vict. c. 98)
- Statute of Praemunire c. 5 Praemunire for purchasing bulls from Rome. The crown of England subject to none.. Recital that the Remedy to recover Presentations to Benefices is in the King's Court, and that the Execution thereof is by the Bishop. — repealed by Criminal Law Act 1967 (c. 58)
- (Pardon) c. 6 A repeal of part of the statute of 13 R. 2. stat. 2. c. 1. touching his forfeiture that obtaineth a pardon. — repealed by Statute Law Revision Act 1948 (11 & 12 Geo. 6. c. 62)

=== Sources ===
- Chronological Table of and Index to the Statutes. Vol. 1: To the End of the Session 59 Vict. Sess. 2 (1895) (13th ed.). London: Her Majesty's Stationery Office. 1896. p. 31 – via Google Books.
- Chronological Table of the Statutes: Covering the Period from 1235 to the End of 1971. London: Her Majesty's Stationery Office. 1972. p. 27. ISBN 978-0-11-840096-1 – via Google Books.

== 1393 (17 Ric. 2) ==
The 21st Parliament of King Richard II, which met from 27 January 1394 until 6 March 1394.

This session was also traditionally cited as 17 R. 2 or 17 Rich. 2.

- (Money) c. 1 There shall be no melting of money to make any thing thereof. Foreign money shall not be current. — repealed for England and Wales by Statute Law Revision Act 1863 (26 & 27 Vict. c. 125) and for Ireland by Statute Law (Ireland) Revision Act 1872 (35 & 36 Vict. c. 98)
- (Cloths) c. 2 Every person may make cloth of what length and breadth he will. — repealed for England and Wales by Woollen Manufacture Act 1809 (49 Geo. 3. c. 109) and for Ireland by Statute Law (Ireland) Revision Act 1872 (35 & 36 Vict. c. 98)
- (Exportation of worsted) c. 3 What sort of worsteds may be carried forth of the realm, and what not. — repealed by Repeal of Acts Concerning Importation Act 1822 (3 Geo. 4. c. 41)
- (Malt) c. 4 Malt sold to London shall be cleansed from the dust. — repealed by Repeal of Obsolete Statutes Act 1856 (19 & 20 Vict. c. 64)
- (Revenue officers) c. 5 A searcher, ganger, aulneger, customer, shall have no assured estate in his office. — repealed by Customs Law Repeal Act 1825 (6 Geo. 4. c. 105)
- (Untrue suggestions in Chancery) c. 6 Upon an untrue suggestion in the chancery, damages may be awarded. — repealed by Civil Procedure Acts Repeal Act 1879 (42 & 43 Vict. c. 59)
- (Exportation of corn) c. 7 All the King's subjects may carry corn out of the realm when they will. — repealed for England and Wales by Continuance of Laws, etc. Act 1627 (3 Cha. 1. c. 5) and for Ireland by Statute Law (Ireland) Revision Act 1872 (35 & 36 Vict. c. 98)
- (Suppressions of riots) c. 8 The sheriffs, and all other the King's officers, shall suppress rioters, and imprison them, and all other offending against the peace. — repealed by Criminal Law Act 1967 (c. 58)
- (Fish) c. 9 Justices of peace shall be conservators of the statutes made touching salmons. — repealed for England and Wales by Salmon Fishery Act 1861 (24 & 25 Vict. c. 109)
- (Gaol delivery) c. 10 Two learned men in the law shall be in commission of gaol delivery. — repealed by Repeal of Obsolete Statutes Act 1856 (19 & 20 Vict. c. 64)
- (London aldermen) c. 11 That aldermen of London shall not hereafter be elected yearly, but remain until they be put out for a reasonable cause.
- (Erroneous judgments in London) c. 12 — repealed for England and Wales by Statute Law Revision Act 1863 (26 & 27 Vict. c. 125) and for Ireland by Statute Law (Ireland) Revision Act 1872 (35 & 36 Vict. c. 98)
- Farringdon Without Act 1393 c. 13 The people of the ward of Farringdon without shall elect an alderman.

=== Sources ===
- Chronological Table of and Index to the Statutes. Vol. 1: To the End of the Session 59 Vict. Sess. 2 (1895) (13th ed.). London: Her Majesty's Stationery Office. 1896. p. 31 – via Google Books.
- Chronological Table of the Statutes: Covering the Period from 1235 to the End of 1971. London: Her Majesty's Stationery Office. 1972. p. 27. ISBN 978-0-11-840096-1 – via Google Books.

== 1396 (20 Ric. 2) ==
The 23nd Parliament of King Richard II, which met from 22 January 1397 until 12 February 1397.

This session was also traditionally cited as 20 R. 2 or 20 Rich. 2.

- (Riding armed) c. 1 No man shall ride or go armed. Launcegays shall be put out.— repealed by Repeal of Obsolete Statutes Act 1856 (19 & 20 Vict. c. 64)
- (Liveries) c. 2 Who only may wear another's livery. — repealed by Repeal of Obsolete Statutes Act 1856 (19 & 20 Vict. c. 64)
- (Justices of assize)c. 3 No man shall sit upon the bench with the justices of assise. — repealed for England and Wales by Statute Law Revision Act 1863 (26 & 27 Vict. c. 125) and for Ireland by Statute Law (Ireland) Revision Act 1872 (35 & 36 Vict. c. 98)
- c. 4 A confirmation of part of the stat. of 28 Ed. III. c 13. (Note: Confirmation, etc., of 27 Ed. 3. St. 2 Act 1354 (28 Edw. 3. c. 13)) touching merchant strangers. — repealed for England and Wales by Continuance of Laws, etc. Act 1627 (3 Cha. 1. c. 5) and for Ireland by Repeal of Acts Concerning Importation Act 1822 (3 Geo. 4. c. 41)
- c. 5 The penalty of him who taketh another's horse or beast for the King's service without sufficient warrant. — repealed for England and Wales by Statute Law Revision Act 1863 (26 & 27 Vict. c. 125) and for Ireland by Statute Law (Ireland) Revision Act 1872 (35 & 36 Vict. c. 98)
- c. 6 Licence granted to Belknap, Holte, and Bourghe, to return into England, notwithstanding the statute of 11 Rich. II. c. 1. (Note: 11 Ric. 2. c. 1) — repealed for England and Wales by Statute Law Revision Act 1863 (26 & 27 Vict. c. 125) and for Ireland by Statute Law (Ireland) Revision Act 1872 (35 & 36 Vict. c. 98)

=== Sources ===
- Chronological Table of and Index to the Statutes. Vol. 1: To the End of the Session 59 Vict. Sess. 2 (1895) (13th ed.). London: Her Majesty's Stationery Office. 1896. p. 31 – via Google Books.
- Chronological Table of the Statutes: Covering the Period from 1235 to the End of 1971. London: Her Majesty's Stationery Office. 1972. p. 27. ISBN 978-0-11-840096-1 – via Google Books.

== 1397 (21 Ric. 2) ==
The 24th Parliament of King Richard II, which met from 17 September 1397 until 31 January 1398.

This session was also traditionally cited as 21 R. 2 or 21 Rich. 2.

- (Confirmation of liberties and franchises) c. 1 A confirmation of former liberties to the lords spiritual and temporal, cities, boroughs, and commonalty. — repealed by 1 Hen. 4. c. 3
- (Repeal of 10 Ric. 2) c. 2 A repeal of the commission granted by the King to certain noblemen to enquire of certain abuses, and of the statute made Anno 10 Rich. II. (Note: 10 Ric. 2. c. 1) — repealed by 1 Hen. 4. c. 3
- (Treasons) c. 3 It shall be adjudged high treason for any person to compass the death of the King, to depose him, to make war against him within the realm, &c. — repealed by 1 Hen. 4. c. 3
- (Treasons) c. 4 It shall be likewise high treason to attempt to repeal any judgments made by parliament against certain traitors. — repealed by 1 Hen. 4. c. 3
- c. 5 The oaths and fealty of great men shall be inrolled in parliament. — repealed by 1 Hen. 4. c. 3
- c. 6 The sons of the persons before attainted excluded from parliament, &c. — repealed by 1 Hen. 4. c. 3
- c. 7 A repeal of the annuities, corrodies, &c. granted by those traitors. — repealed by 1 Hen. 4. c. 3
- c. 8 The King shall have the collation to all benefices so forfeited. — repealed by 1 Hen. 4. c. 3
- c. 9 The county of Chester made a principality, and several castles and towns annexed to the same. — repealed by 1 Hen. 4. c. 3
- c. 10 The castles and revenues of the late earl of Warwick shall remain in the King's hands. — repealed by 1 Hen. 4. c. 3
- c. 11 And likewise those belonging to the duke of Gloucester. — repealed by 1 Hen. 4. c. 3
- Treason Act 1397 c. 12 For approving the Opinions of certain Judges concerning the Statute and Commission 10 Ric. 2: (Note: 10 Ric. 2. c. 1) and for repealing all Proceedings in the Parliament 11 Ric. 2. (Note: 11 Ric. 2) — repealed by 1 Hen. 4. c. 3
- c. 13 A reversal of the sentence against Michael de la Pole, late earl of Suffolk. — repealed by 1 Hen. 4. c. 3
- c. 14 The King's pardon of robberies, thefts, outrages, and riots, commited in the time of the commotion. — repealed by 1 Hen. 4. c. 3
- c. 15 The King's pardon to all his subjects of alienations without licence, intrusions by the heirs after the death of their ancestors, treasons, felonies, &c. — repealed by 1 Hen. 4. c. 3
- c. 16 Authority given by parliament to certain commissioners to examine and answer petitions exhibited to the King. — repealed by 1 Hen. 4. c. 3
- c. 17 There shall be no licences granted to ship merchandises of the staple to any other place but to Calais. — repealed by 1 Hen. 4. c. 3
- c. 18 Stones shall be carried for lastage towards the repair of the beacons, the place called Paradise, and other decayed places in Calais. — repealed for England and Wales by Statute Law Revision Act 1863 (26 & 27 Vict. c. 125) and for Ireland by Statute Law (Ireland) Revision Act 1872 (35 & 36 Vict. c. 98)
- c. 19 A rehearsal and confirmation of the statutes of 25 Edw. III. c. 4. (Note: 25 Edw. 3. Stat. 3. c. 4) and 45 Edw. III. c. 2. (Note: 45 Edw. 3. c. 2) touching the pulling down of wears, mills, stakes, &c. — repealed by 1 Hen. 4. c. 3
- c. 20 Whosoever shall pursue to repeal any of these statutes, and that proved in parliament, shall be adjudged a traitor. — repealed by 1 Hen. 4. c. 3

=== Sources ===
- Chronological Table of and Index to the Statutes. Vol. 1: To the End of the Session 59 Vict. Sess. 2 (1895) (13th ed.). London: Her Majesty's Stationery Office. 1896. p. 31 – via Google Books.
- Chronological Table of the Statutes: Covering the Period from 1235 to the End of 1971. London: Her Majesty's Stationery Office. 1972. p. 27. ISBN 978-0-11-840096-1 – via Google Books.

== See also ==
- List of acts of the Parliament of England
