= Crown Lands Act =

Stock short title used for legislation

Crown Lands Act is a stock short title used in the United Kingdom for legislation relating to crown lands.

== List ==
=== United Kingdom ===
- The Crown Lands Act 1623 (21 Jas. 1. c. 25)
- The Crown Lands Act 1702 (1 Ann. c. 1)
- The Crown Land Act 1819 (59 Geo. 3. c. 94)
- The Crown Lands Act 1823 (4 Geo. 4. c. 18)
- The Crown Lands Act 1825 (6 Geo. 4. c. 17)
- The Crown Lands Act 1848 (11 & 12 Vict. c. 102)
- The Crown Lands (Copyholds) Act 1851 (14 & 15 Vict. c 46)
- The Crown Lands Act 1855 (18 & 19 Vict. c. 16)

The Crown Lands Acts

The Crown Lands Acts 1829 to 1894 is the collective title of the following acts:

- The Crown Lands Act 1829 (10 Geo. 4. c. 50)
- The Crown Lands Act 1832 (2 & 3 Will. 4. c. 1)
- The Crown Lands (Scotland) Act 1832 (2 & 3 Will. 4. c. 112)
- The Crown Lands (Scotland) Act 1833 (3 & 4 Will. 4. c. 69)
- The Crown Lands (Scotland) Act 1835 (5 & 6 Will. 4. c. 58)
- The Crown Lands Act 1841 (5 Vict. c. 1)
- The Crown Lands Act 1845 (8 & 9 Vict. c. 99)
- The Crown Lands Act 1851 (14 & 15 Vict. c. 42)
- The Crown Lands Act 1852 (15 & 16 Vict. c. 62)
- The Crown Lands Act 1853 (16 & 17 Vict. c. 56)
- The Crown Lands Act 1866 (29 & 30 Vict. c. 62)
- The Crown Lands Act 1873 (36 & 37 Vict. c. 36)
- The Crown Lands Act 1885 (48 & 49 Vict. c. 79)
- The Crown Lands Act 1894 (57 & 58 Vict. c. 43)

The Crown Lands Act 1906 (6 Edw. 7. c. 28) may be cited with the Crown Lands Acts 1829 to 1894.

The Crown Lands Acts 1829 to 1927 was the collective title of the Crown Lands Act 1927 (17 & 18 Geo. 5. c. 23) and the Crown Lands Acts 1829 to 1894.

The Crown Lands Acts 1829 to 1936 is the collective title of Part II of the Crown Lands Act 1936 (26 Geo. 5 & 1 Edw. 8. c. 47) and the Crown Lands Acts 1829 to 1936.

=== New South Wales ===
- Crown Lands Acts 1861 (NSW)

=== New Zealand ===
- Crown Lands Act 1849 (New Zealand)

== See also ==
- List of short titles
