= Forcible Entry Act 1381 =

Act of the Parliament of England

Forcible Entry Act 1381 (Note: The citation of this act by this short title was authorised by section 5 of, and the second schedule to, the Statute Law Revision Act 1948. Due to the repeal of those provisions, it is now authorised by section 19(2) of the Interpretation Act 1978.) (Note: The citation of this act as the Forcible Entry Act, 1381 is authorised for the Republic of Ireland by section 1 of, and part V of the second schedule to, the Short Titles Act 1962.)
- Act of Parliament
- Parliament of England
- Long title: Forcible entries forbidden.
- Citation: 5 Ric. 2 Stat. 1. c. 7
- Territorial extent: England and Wales; Ireland]

Dates
- Royal assent: 1381
- Commencement: 3 November 1381 (Note: Start of session.)
- Repealed: 1 December 1977 (Note: The Criminal Law Act 1977 (Commencement No. 3) Order 1977.)

Other legislation
- Repealed by: Criminal Law Act 1977
- Relates to: Forcible Entry Act 1391; Forcible Entry Act 1429; Forcible Entry Act 1588; Forcible Entry Act 1623

Status: Repealed

Text of statute as originally enacted

The Forcible Entry Act 1381 (5 Ric. 2 Stat. 1. c. 7) was an act of the Parliament of the Kingdom of England that created a statutory offence of forcible entry which superseded the common law offence.

It is written in the Anglo-Norman language. The original text (reproduced here in Roman script, without most accents in the original) is sourced from The Statutes, 1870 Revised Edition, Vol. I, p.227:

Et Auxint le Roi defende q nully desore face entree en aucunes tres & teñz sinoun en cas ou entree est done p la loy, & en cell cas nemye a forte main ne a multitude des gentz, einz tantsoulement en [lisible & aisee] mane, et si nully desore face a contraire & ent soit convict duement soit puniz p emprisonment de son corps & dilloeqs reint a la voluntee le Roy.

It has been translated as follows:

And also the King defendeth, that none from henceforth make any entry into lands and tenements, but in case where entry is given by the law; and in such case not with strong hand, nor with multitude of people, but only in [peaceable] and easy manner. And if any man from henceforth do the contrary, and thereof be duly convict, he shall be punished by imprisonment of his body, and thereof ransomed at the King's will.

There were doubts about the interpretation of the act. Through into the 1970s, squatters invoked the 1381 statute to counter threats of forcible eviction without a court order. They were satisfied that, provided they had used no force to enter an unoccupied property, the owners could not force entry to evict them. It seemed "simple enough".

Most empty houses had open windows, doors or other means of access. If squatters secured the property (for example by putting a lock of their own on the door thus making it impossible for the owner to enter except by force), then the owner could not enter and carry out an eviction without breaking the criminal law which few owners were prepared to do.

It is not clear that the courts, at any time, construed the law in this way. But the issue was ultimately rendered moot by passage of the Criminal Law Act 1977, and of subsequent legislation, that effectively criminalised trespass in the case of the unauthorised occupation of residential property.

== Subsequent developments ==
The act was extended to Ireland by Poynings' Law 1495 (10 Hen. 7 c. 22 (I)). The act was retained for the Republic of Ireland by section 2(2)(a) of, and part 2 of schedule 1 to, the Statute Law Revision Act 2007.

The whole act was repealed by sections 13(2)(a) of and 65(5), and schedule 13 to, the Criminal Law Act 1977].

== See also ==
Forcible Entry Act
