= Forcible entry =

Act of entering a property by force

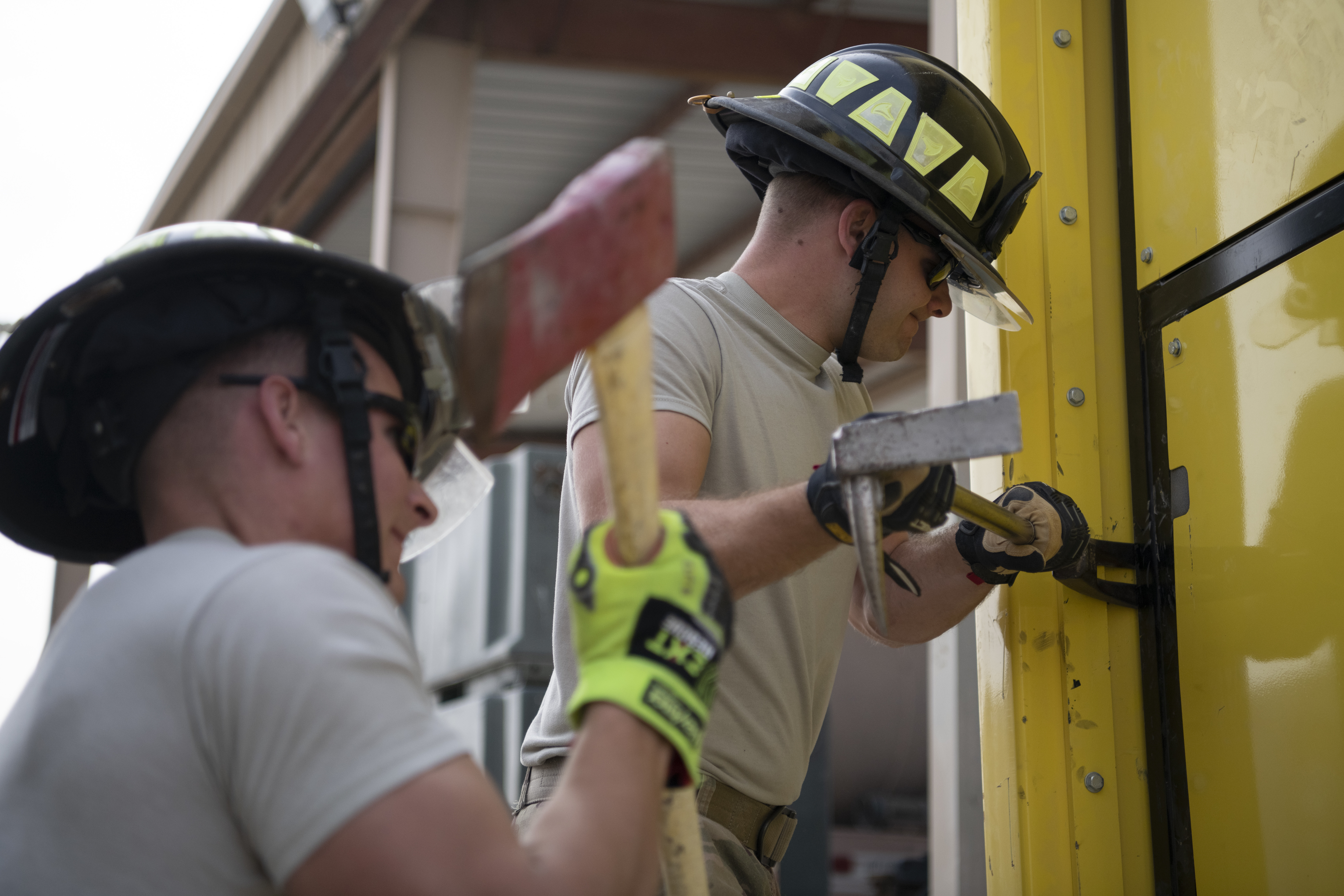
Forcible entry training using a Halligan bar.

Forcible entry is "the unlawful taking of possession of real property by force or threats of force or unlawful entry into or onto another's property, especially when accompanied by force". The term is also sometimes used for entry by military, police, or emergency personnel, also called breaching. For the fire service, forcible entry is defined by the International Fire Service Training Association (IFSTA) as:

The techniques used to get into buildings or other areas of confinement when normal means of entry are locked or blocked.

Breaching doorways can be differentiated as "through the lock" or "through the door" depending on the techniques used.

== England and Wales ==
Forcible entry was a common law offence in England and Wales, but was abolished, along with forcible detainer, by the Criminal Law Act 1977. It was replaced with a new offence of "using violence to secure entry" under section 6 of that Act.

Formerly the Forcible Entry Act 1381, the Forcible Entry Act 1391, the Forcible Entry Act 1429, the Forcible Entry Act 1588 and the Forcible Entry Act 1623 (repealed).

Judge Donaldson considered the question of forcible entry in the UK, in Swales v. Cox (1981):

... he uses force if he applies any energy to the obstacle with a view to removing it. It would follow that, if my view is correct, where there is a door which is ajar but it is insufficiently ajar for someone to go through the opening without moving the door and energy is applied to that door to make it open further, force is being used. A fortiori force is used when the door is latched and you turn the handle from the outside and then ease the door open. Similarly, if someone opens any window or increases the opening in any window, or indeed dislodges the window by the application of any energy, he is using force to enter ...

== See also ==
For other crimes related to forcible entry, see:

- Breaking and entering
- Trespass
- Home invasion
- Vandalism

For methods used by military, police, and emergency services to enter buildings, see:

- Door breaching
- Glass breaker
- Shove knife
