= Treason Act 1381 =

Act of the Parliament of England

- Act of Parliament
- Parliament of England
- Long title: Manumissions, Reliefs, Bonds, Feoffments, and caused late made by Compulsion, shall be void. It shall be Treason to begin a Riot, Rout, or Rumour.
- Citation: 5 Ric. 2. Stat. 1. c. 6
- Territorial extent: England and Wales; Ireland

Dates
- Royal assent: 25 February 1382
- Commencement: 3 November 1381 (Note: Start of session.)
- Repealed: 6 October 1399

Other legislation
- Repealed by: Treason Act 1399
- Relates to: Treason Act 1397

Status: Repealed

Text of statute as originally enacted

The Treason Act 1381 (5 Ric. 2 Stat. 1. c. 6) was an act of the Parliament of England. It stipulated that "none from henceforth make nor begin any manner of riot and rumour, nor other like." To do so was made high treason. The act was passed in response to the Peasants' Revolt earlier that year.

== Repeal ==
The whole act was repealed in 1399 by the Treason Act 1399 (1 Hen. 4. c. 10), which repealed all acts relating to treason except for the Treason Act 1351 (25 Edw. 3. Stat. 5. c. 3).

The whole of 5 Ric. 2. Stat. 1 except chapter 7, including this act which was already repealed, was repealed for England and Wales by section 1 of, and the schedule to, the Statute Law Revision Act 1863 (26 & 27 Vict. c. 125) and for Ireland by section 1 of, and the schedule to, the Statute Law (Ireland) Revision Act 1872 (35 & 36 Vict. c. 98).

== See also ==
- High treason in the United Kingdom
- Treason Act 1397
- Treason Act
