= Statutes concerning forcible entries and riots confirmed =

Act of the Parliament of England

Forcible Entry Act 1391
- Act of Parliament
- Parliament of England
- Long title: None
- Citation: 15 Ric. 2. c. 2
- Territorial extent: England and Wales; Ireland

Dates
- Royal assent: 3 November 1391 (Note: The morrow after All Souls' Day.)
- Commencement: 3 November 1391 (Note: Start of session.)
- Repealed: 1 December 1977 (Note: The Criminal Law Act 1977 (Commencement No. 3) Order 1977.)

Other legislation
- Amends: Forcible Entry Act 1381
- Repealed by: Criminal Law Act 1977
- Relates to: Forcible Entry Act 1381; Forcible Entry Act 1429; Forcible Entry Act 1588; Forcible Entry Act 1623

Status: Repealed

Text of statute as originally enacted

Statutes concerning forcible entries and riots confirmed (Note: This chapter is referred to by this expression in the second column of schedule 13 to the Criminal Law Act 1977 which is headed "Short Title". But there is no earlier act authorising the citation of this chapter by any short title and the expression seems to be taken from the marginal note to this chapter in printed copies of the Statute 15 Ric 2. See for example The Statutes, Third Revised Edition, HMSO, 1950) or the Forcible Entry Act 1391 (Note: The citation of this act as the Forcible Entry Act 1391 is authorised for the Republic of Ireland by section 1 of, and part V of the second schedule to, the Short Titles Act 1962 (as read with section 14(3)(a) of the Interpretation Act 2005).) (15 Ric. 2. c. 2) was an act of the Parliament of England.

The act provided that the Forcible Entry Act 1381 (5 Ric. 2 Stat. 1. c. 7) and one or more other pieces of legislation were to be held and kept and fully executed. It also authorised any justice of the peace, who had received a complaint that such a forcible entry had been committed, to take the power of the county to arrest any person found committing forcible detainer after that forcible entry.

== Legacy ==
The act was extended to Ireland by Poynings' Law 1495 (10 Hen. 7. c. 22 (I)). (Note: This is asserted by the second schedule of the Short Titles Act 1962.)

The whole act was repealed for England and Wales by sections 13(2)(b) and 65(5) of, and schedule 13 to, the Criminal Law Act 1977, on 1 December 1977.

The whole act was repealed for the Republic of Ireland by section 1 of, and Part II of the Schedule to, the Statute Law Revision Act 1983 (which repealed the whole of the 15 Ric. 2., of which this act is part).

== See also ==
- Forcible Entry Act
