= Treason Act 1397 =

Act of the Parliament of England

- Act of Parliament
- Parliament of England
- Long title: For approving the Opinions of certain Judges concerning the Statute and Commission 10 Ric. 2: and for repealing all Proceedings in the Parliament 11 Ric. 2.
- Citation: 21 Ric. 2. c. 12
- Territorial extent: England and Wales; Ireland

Dates
- Royal assent: 1397
- Commencement: 17 September 1397 (Note: Start of session.)
- Repealed: 6 October 1399

Other legislation
- Repealed by: 1 Hen. 4. c. 3
- Relates to: Treason Act 1351; Treason Act 1381; Treason Act 1399; Statute Law Revision Act 1863; Statute Law Revision (Ireland) Act 1872

Status: Repealed

Text of statute as originally enacted

The Treason Act 1397 (21 Ric. 2. c. 12) was an act of the Parliament of England. It was supplemented by six other acts (21 Ric. 2. cc. 2, 3, 4, 6, 7 and 20). The seven acts together dealt with high treason.

This act was passed during the final years of King Richard II's reign. The main act (c. 12) was stipulated several new crimes which were to be treason. Another act (c. 3) confirmed that to "compasseth or purpose the death of the king, or to depose him", as well as the making of war against him in his realm, were treasonous acts. This act went further than the Treason Act 1351 (25 Edw. 3 Stat. 5. c. 2), which required that the offence be proved "of open deed". A third act (c. 4) also made it treason "to attempt to repeal any Judgments made by Parliament against certain traitors" (i.e. acts of attainder). A fourth act (c. 6) disqualified the sons of traitors from sitting in Parliament or the King's Council. A fifth act (c. 7) voided all "Annuities, Fees, Corodies, and all other Charges made or granted" by traitors after the date of the treason they were convicted of. A sixth act (c. 2) made it treason to set up any commission which was prejudicial to the king (this was in response to a commission of Lords Appellant which had been set up by Parliament in 1386, against Richard's will (10 Ric. 2. c. 1, 1386)). The last act (c. 20) made it treason to "pursue to repeal any of these statutes".

The new treasons created by Richard were abolished by the Treason Act 1399 (1 Hen. 4 c. 10) passed in the first year of his successor, Henry IV (1399), which returned the law of treason to what it had been under the Treason Act 1351 (25 Edw. 3. Stat. 5. c. 3). This act explained the reason for the repeal:

Whereas in the said Parliament holden the said one and twentieth Year of the said late King Richard, divers Pains of Treason were ordained by Statute, in as much that there was no Man which did know how he ought to behave himself, to do, speak, or say, for Doubt of such Pains, It is accorded and assented by the King, the Lords and Commons aforesaid, that in no Time to come any Treason be judged otherwise, than it was ordained by the Statute of his noble Grandfather King Edward the Third, whom God assoil.

The jurist Sir William Blackstone wrote in his Commentaries on the Laws of England:

The most arbitrary and absurd [treason] of all which was by the statute 21 Ric. II. c. 3. which made the bare purpose and intent of killing or deposing the king, without any overt act to demonstrate it, high treason. And yet so little effect have over-violent laws to prevent any crime, that within two years afterwards this very prince was both deposed and murdered.

== Detail of provisions ==
=== Chapter 3 ===
21 Ric. 2. c. 3 created four kinds of treason:

1. "[to] compass[] or purpose[] the Death of the King"
2. "or to depose him"
3. "or to render up his Homage or Liege"
4. "or [to] ... raise[] People and ride[] against the King to make War within his Realm"

The act declared that the procedure for prosecuting someone for any of these was by attainder in Parliament.

=== Chapter 12 ===
21 Ric. 2 c. 12 repealed everything done by the parliament of 1387 (11 Ric. 2) and declared that the people who had been responsible for it were traitors. Moreover, it was declared to be treason for Parliament to impeach any of the king's officers without his consent, or for Parliament to continue to deliberate after the king dissolved it.

== Subsequent developments ==
The act was extended to Ireland by Poynings' Law 1495 (10 Hen. 7. c. 22 (I)).

The whole act was repealed by 1 Hen. 4. c. 3, which repealed all acts passed in the whole parliament of 21 Ric. 2.

The whole of 21 Ric. 2., including this act which was already was repealed, was repealed for England and Wales by section 1 of, and the schedule to, the Statute Law Revision Act 1863 (26 & 27 Vict. c. 125), which came into force on 28 July 1863.

The whole of 21 Ric. 2., including this act which was already was repealed, was repealed for Ireland by section 1 of, and the schedule to, the Statute Law (Ireland) Revision Act 1872 (35 & 36 Vict. c. 98), which came into force on 10 August 1872.

== See also ==
- High treason in the United Kingdom
- Treason Act 1381 (another act passed by Richard II)
- Treason Act
