= Admiralty Jurisdiction Act 1391 =

Act of the Parliament of England

Admiralty Jurisdiction Act 1391 (Note: The citation of this act by this short title was authorised by section 5 of, and the second schedule to, the Statute Law Revision Act 1948. Due to the repeal of those provisions, it is now authorised by section 19(2) of the Interpretation Act 1978.)
- Act of Parliament
- Parliament of England
- Long title: Jurisdiction of the admiral. (Note: These words are printed against this act in the second column of the second schedule to the Statute Law Revision Act 1948, which is headed "Title".)
- Citation: 15 Ric. 2. c. 3
- Territorial extent: England and Wales; Ireland

Dates
- Royal assent: 3 November 1391 (Note: The morrow after All Souls' Day.)
- Commencement: 3 November 1391 (Note: Start of session.)
- Repealed: 1 January 1968

Other legislation
- Amended by: Civil Procedure Acts Repeal Act 1879
- Repealed by: Criminal Law Act 1967

Status: Repealed

Text of statute as originally enacted

The Admiralty Jurisdiction Act 1391 (15 Ric. 2. c. 3) was an act of the Parliament of England.

== Subsequent developments ==
The act was extended to Ireland by Poynings' Law 1495 (10 Hen. 7. c. 22 (I)).

The words from the beginning of the chapter to "his Lieutenant in anywise" were repealed by section 2 of, and part I of the schedule to, the Civil Procedure Acts Repeal Act 1879 (42 & 43 Vict. c. 59), which came into force on 15 August 1879.

The whole act, so far as unrepealed, was repealed for England and Wales by section 10(2) of, and part I of schedule 3 to, the Criminal Law Act 1967, which came into force on 1 January 1968.
