= Forcible Entry Act 1429 =

Act of the Parliament of England

Forcible Entry Act 1429 (Note: The citation of this act by this short title was authorised by section 5 of, and the second schedule to, the Statute Law Revision Act 1948. Due to the repeal of those provisions, it is now authorised by section 19(2) of the Interpretation Act 1978.)
- Act of Parliament
- Parliament of England
- Long title: The duty of justices of the peace where land is entered upon or detained with force.
- Citation: 8 Hen. 6. c. 9
- Territorial extent: England and Wales; Ireland

Dates
- Royal assent: 23 February 1430
- Commencement: 22 September 1429 (Note: Start of session.)
- Repealed: 1 December 1977 (Note: The Criminal Law Act 1977 (Commencement No. 3) Order 1977.)

Other legislation
- Amended by: Civil Procedure Acts Repeal Act 1879
- Repealed by: Criminal Law Act 1977
- Relates to: Forcible Entry Act 1381; Forcible Entry Act 1391; Forcible Entry Act 1588; Forcible Entry Act 1623

Status: Repealed

Text of statute as originally enacted

The Forcible Entry Act 1429 (8 Hen. 6. c. 9) was an act of the Parliament of the Kingdom of England.

The act is written in the Anglo-Norman language. It was expressed to be passed because the Forcible Entry Act 1391 (15 Ric. 2. c. 2) was felt to be inadequate because it did not apply to persons committing forcible detainer after a peaceful entry or to persons who, having committed forcible detainer, had been expelled from the land before the justice of the peace arrived to arrest them, and because it did not provide for the punishment of a sheriff who failed to carry out the orders of the justice of the peace to execute the statute.

== Subsequent developments ==
The act was extended to Ireland by Poynings' Law 1495 (10 Hen. 7. c. 22 (I)).

The act was repealed, except in relation to criminal proceedings, by section 2 of, and part I of the schedule to, the Civil Procedure Acts Repeal Act 1879 (42 & 43 Vict. c. 59), which came into force on 15 August 1879.

The whole act was repealed for England and Wales by sections 13(2)(b) and 65(5) of, and schedule 13 to, the Criminal Law Act 1977, on 1 December 1977.

== See also ==
- Forcible Entry Act
