= Forcible Entry Act 1623 =

Act of the Parliament of England

Forcible Entry Act 1623 (Note: The citation of this act by this short title was authorised by section 5 of, and the second schedule to, the Statute Law Revision Act 1948. Due to the repeal of those provisions, it is now authorised by section 19(2) of the Interpretation Act 1978.)
- Act of Parliament
- Parliament of England
- Long title: An Acte to enable Judges & Justices of the Peace to geve Restitucion of Possession in certayne Cases. (Note: These words are printed against this act in the second column of the second schedule to the Statute Law Revision Act 1948, which is headed "Title".)
- Citation: 21 Jas. 1. c. 15
- Territorial extent: England and Wales

Dates
- Royal assent: 29 May 1624
- Commencement: 12 February 1624 (Note: Start of session.)
- Repealed: 1 December 1977 (Note: The Criminal Law Act 1977 (Commencement No. 3) Order 1977.)
Other legislation
Repealed by	Criminal Law Act 1977, ss. 13(2)(e) & 65(5) & Sch. 13
Relates to	Forcible Entry Act 1381; Forcible Entry Act 1391; Forcible Entry Act 1429; Forcible Entry Act 1588

Status: Repealed

Text of statute as originally enacted

The Forcible Entry Act 1623 (21 Jas. 1. c. 15) was an act of the Parliament of England. It provided that any judge who already had a statutory power, on enquiry, to give restitution of possession of freehold land in respect of which forcible entry or forcible detainer was being committed, was to have the same power, on an indictment for forcible entry or forcible detainer committed in respect of land held for a term of years to give restitution of possession of that land.

== Subsequent developments ==
The whole act was repealed for England and Wales by sections 13(2)(b) and 65(5) of, and schedule 13 to, the Criminal Law Act 1977, on 1 December 1977.

== See also ==
- Forcible Entry Act
