= Crown Lands Act 1851 =

Act of the Parliament of the United Kingdom

Crown Lands Act 1851 (Note: The citation of this act by this short title was authorised by the Short Titles Act 1896, section 1 and the first schedule. Due to the repeal of those provisions it is now authorised by section 19(2) of the Interpretation Act 1978.)
- Act of Parliament
- Parliament of the United Kingdom
- Long title: An Act to make better Provision for the Management of the Woods, Forests, and Land Revenues of the Crown, and for the Direction of Public Works and Buildings.
- Citation: 14 & 15 Vict. c. 42
- Territorial extent: United Kingdom

Dates
- Royal assent: 1 August 1851
- Commencement: 10 October 1851 (except payment of salaries and charges)31 March 1852 (whole act) (Note: Section 41.)
Other legislation
Amended by	Commissioners of Works Act 1852; Exchequer and Audit Departments Act 1866; Statute Law Revision Act 1875; Statute Law Revision Act 1953; Statute Law Revision Act 1958; Minerals (Miscellaneous Provisions) Act (Northern Ireland) 1959; Crown Estate Act 1961; Secretary of State for the Environment Order 1970; Statute Law (Repeals) Act 1993

Status: Amended

Text of statute as originally enacted

Revised text of statute as amended

Text of the Crown Lands Act 1851 as in force today (including any amendments) within the United Kingdom, from legislation.gov.uk.

The Crown Lands Act 1851 (14 & 15 Vict. c. 42) is an act of the Parliament of the United Kingdom that established the Commissioners of Works as the body responsible for management of royal parks and gardens, specifically;

- Saint James's Park
- Hyde Park
- Green Park
- Kensington Gardens
- Chelsea Garden
- Treasury Garden
- Parliament Square Garden
- Regent's Park
- Primrose Hill
- Victoria Park
- Battersea Park
- Greenwich Park
- Kew Gardens, Pleasure Grounds, and Green
- Kew and Richmond Roads
- Hampton Court Gardens, Green, and Road
- Hampton Court Park
- Richmond Park and Richmond Green
- Bushey Park
- Holyrood Park

== Subsequent developments ==
In section 3, the words " and for the purpose of such Acts the Commissioners of Woods shall be a corporation in the place of the said Commissioners of Her Majesty's Woods, Forests, Land Revenues, Works and Buildings ", and section 5 of the act were repealed by section 1 of, and the first schedule to, the Statute Law Revision Act 1953 (2 & 3 Eliz. 2. c. 5), which came into force on 18 December 1953.

Sections 1 and 2 of the act were repealed by section 2 of, and the second schedule to, the Statute Law Revision Act 1958 (6 & 7 Eliz. 2. c. 46), which came into force on 23 July 1958.

== See also ==
- Crown Lands Act
