= Common Informers Act 1623 =

Act of the Parliament of England

Common Informers Act 1623 (Note: The citation of this act by this short title was authorised by section 5 of, and the second schedule to, the Statute Law Revision Act 1948. Due to the repeal of those provisions, it is now authorised by section 19(2) of the Interpretation Act 1978.)
- Act of Parliament
- Parliament of England
- Long title: An Act for the Ease of the Subject concerning the Informacions uppon Penall Statutes. (Note: These words are printed against this act in the second column of the second schedule to the Statute Law Revision Act 1948, which is headed "Title".)
- Citation: 21 Jas. 1. c. 4
- Territorial extent: England and Wales

Dates
- Royal assent: 29 May 1624
- Commencement: 29 May 1624 (Note: Section 1. End of session.)
- Repealed: 29 July 1959

Other legislation
- Amended by: Statute Law Revision Act 1888; Statute Law Revision Act 1948
- Repealed by: Statute Law Revision Act 1959
- Relates to: Common Informers Act 1951

Status: Repealed

Text of statute as originally enacted

The Common Informers Act 1623 (21 Jas. 1. c. 4) was an act of the Parliament of England.

== Subsequent developments ==
In section 1 of the act, the words from "after the end" to "session of Parliament", and in section 5, the words from "nor to any suit" to "poundage, wooll, &c.", were repealed by section 1 of, and the first schedule to, the Statute Law Revision Act 1948 (11 & 12 Geo. 6. c. 62), which came into force on 30 July 1948.

The whole act was repealed by section 2 of, and the second schedule to, the Statute Law Revision Act 1959 (7 & 8 Eliz. 2. c. 68), which came into force on 29 July 1959.

== See also ==
- Common informer
