= Treason Act 1399 =

Act of the Parliament of England

- Act of Parliament
- Parliament of England
- Long title: Nothing shall be accounted treason but what was made treason in the time of King Edward the Third.
- Citation: 1 Hen. 4. c. 10
- Territorial extent: {{England and Wales|Ireland}}

Dates
- Royal assent: 1399
- Commencement: 6 October 1399 (Note: Start of session.)
- Repealed: 10 August 1872

Other legislation
- Repeals/revokes: Treason Act 1381
- Amended by: Treason Act 1553; Treason Act 1547; Statute Law Revision Act 1863
- Repealed by: Statute Law (Ireland) Revision Act 1872
- Relates to: Treason Act 1351; Treason Act 1397

Status: Repealed

Text of statute as originally enacted

The Treason Act 1399 (1 Hen. 4 c. 10) was an act of the Parliament of England that repealed all acts relating to treason except for the Treason Act 1351 (25 Edw. 3. Stat. 5. c. 3).

== Subsequent developments ==
The act was extended to Ireland by Poynings' Law 1495 (10 Hen. 7. c. 22 (I)).

The whole act was repealed for England and Wales by section 1 of, and the schedule to, the Statute Law Revision Act 1863 (26 & 27 Vict. c. 125) and for Ireland by section 1 of, and the schedule to, the Statute Law (Ireland) Revision Act 1872 (35 & 36 Vict. c. 98).

== See also ==
- High treason in the United Kingdom
- Treason Act
