= Crown Lands Act 1623 =

Act of the Parliament of England

Crown Lands Act 1623 (Note: The citation of this act by this short title was authorised by section 5 of, and the second schedule to, the Statute Law Revision Act 1948. Due to the repeal of those provisions, it is now authorised by section 19(2) of the Interpretation Act 1978.)
- Act of Parliament
- Parliament of England
- Long title: An Acte for the Reliefe of Patentees Tenauntes & Farmors of Crowne Landes in Cases Forfeyture. (Note: These words are printed against this act in the second column of the second schedule to the Statute Law Revision Act 1948, which is headed "Title".)
- Citation: 21 Jas. 1. c. 25
- Territorial extent: England and Wales

Dates
- Royal assent: 29 May 1624
- Commencement: 12 February 1624 (Note: Start of session.)
Other legislation
Amended by	Statute Law Revision Act 1888; Statute Law Revision Act 1948

Status: Amended

Text of statute as originally enacted

Revised text of statute as amended

Text of the Crown Lands Act 1623 as in force today (including any amendments) within the United Kingdom, from legislation.gov.uk.

The Crown Lands Act 1623 (21 Jas. 1. c. 25) is an act of the Parliament of England.

The act was partly in force in Great Britain at the end of 2010.

== See also ==
- Crown Lands Act
