= Forcible Entry Act 1588 =

Act of the Parliament of England

Forcible Entry Act 1588 (Note: The citation of this act by this short title was authorised by section 5 of, and the second schedule to, the Statute Law Revision Act 1948. Due to the repeal of those provisions, it is now authorised by section 19(2) of the Interpretation Act 1978.)
- Act of Parliament
- Parliament of England
- Long title: An Acte for Explanacion or Declaracion of the Statute of Octavo Regis Henrici Sexti, concerninge forcible Entries & the Indictmentes therupon to be founde. (Note: These words are printed against this act in the second column of the second schedule to the Statute Law Revision Act 1948, which is headed "Title".)
- Citation: 31 Eliz. 1. c. 11
- Territorial extent: England and Wales

Dates
- Royal assent: 29 March 1589
- Commencement: 4 February 1589 (Note: Start of session.)
- Repealed: 1 December 1977 (Note: The Criminal Law Act 1977 (Commencement No. 3) Order 1977 (SI 1977/1682).)
Other legislation
Amended by	Administration of Justice Act 1965
Repealed by	Criminal Law Act 1977
Relates to	Forcible Entry Act 1381; Forcible Entry Act 1391; Forcible Entry Act 1429; Forcible Entry Act 1588

Status: Repealed

Text of statute as originally enacted

The Forcible Entry Act 1588 (31 Eliz. 1. c. 11) was an act of the Parliament of England.

Its purpose was to prevent the avoidance of the proviso to the Forcible Entry Act 1429 (8 Hen. 6. c. 9). It provided that no restitution was to be made on an indictment for forcible entry against parties who had been in possession of the land for three years or more. It further provided that the fact of three or more years possession could be alleged in stay of restitution, on penalty of payment of costs if that fact was not proved.

== Subsequent developments ==
The whole act was repealed by sections 13(2)(d) and 65(5), and schedule 13 to, the Criminal Law Act 1977, which came into force on 1 December 1977.

== See also ==
- Forcible Entry Act
