= Criminal Law Act 1977 =

Act of the Parliament of the United Kingdom

Criminal Law Act 1977 (Note: Section 65(1).)
- Act of Parliament
- Parliament of the United Kingdom
- Long title: An Act to amend the law of England and Wales with respect to criminal conspiracy; to make new provision in that law, in place of the provisions of the common law and the Statutes of Forcible Entry, for restricting the use or threat of violence for securing entry into any premises and for penalising unauthorised entry or remaining on premises in certain circumstances; otherwise to amend the criminal law, including the law with respect to the administration of criminal justice; to provide for the alteration of certain pecuniary and other limits; to amend section 9(4) of the Administration of Justice Act 1973, the Legal Aid Act 1974, the Rabies Act 1974 and the Diseases of Animals (Northern Ireland) Order 1975 and the law about juries and coroners inquests; and for connected purposes.
- Citation: 1977 c. 45
- Territorial extent: England and Wales; Scotland (in part); Northern Ireland; Channel Islands; Isle of Man; (Note: Section 65(10).)

Dates
- Royal assent: 29 July 1977
- Commencement: Various (Note: Section 65(7).)
Other legislation
Amends	Night Poaching Act 1828; Railways Clauses Consolidation Act 1845Town Police Clauses Act 1847; Accessories and Abettors Act 1861; Railways Clauses Act 1863; Prosecution of Offences Act 1879; Explosive Substances Act 1883; Military Lands Act 1892; Deeds of Arrangement Act 1914; Land Settlement (Facilities) Act 1919; Sexual Offences Act 1956; Manœuvres Act 1958; Obscene Publications Act 1959; Public Order Act 1963; Shipping Contracts and Commercial Documents Act 1964; Criminal Justice Act 1967; Sexual Offences Act 1967; Misuse of Drugs Act 1971; Industry Act 1972; Bail Act 1976
Repeals/revokes	Forcible Entry Act 1381; Forcible Entry Act 1391; Forcible Entry Act 1429; Forcible Entry Act 1588; Forcible Entry Act 1623
Amended by	Adoption (Scotland) Act 1978; Interpretation Act 1978; Customs and Excise Management Act 1979; Child Care Act 1980; Residential Homes Act 1980; Protection of Trading Interests Act 1980; Magistrates' Courts Act 1980; Education (Scotland) Act 1980; Criminal Appeal (Northern Ireland) Act 1980; Highways Act 1980; Animal Health Act 1981; Criminal Attempts Act 1981; Forgery and Counterfeiting Act 1981; Representation of the People Act 1983; Mental Health Act 1983; Registered Homes Act 1984; Dentists Act 1984; Road Traffic Regulation Act 1984; Building Act 1984; Cinemas Act 1985; Weights and Measures Act 1985; Wages Act 1986; Diplomatic and Consular Premises Act 1987; Coroners Act 1988; Legal Aid Act 1988; Road Traffic (Consequential Provisions) Act 1988; Opticians Act 1989; Prisons (Scotland) Act 1989; Computer Misuse Act 1990; Water Consolidation (Consequential Provisions) Act 1991; Trade Union and Labour Relations (Consolidation) Act 1992; Criminal Justice Act 1993; Probation Service Act 1993; Statute Law (Repeals) Act 1993; Criminal Justice and Public Order Act 1994; Criminal Appeal Act 1995; Criminal Procedure (Consequential Provisions) (Scotland) Act 1995; Police Act 1996; Housing Grants, Construction and Regeneration Act 1996; Housing Act 1996 (Consequential Provisions) Order 1996; Government of Wales Act 1998; Criminal Justice (Terrorism and Conspiracy) Act 1998; Regulation of Care (Scotland) Act 2001; Adoption and Children Act 2002; Courts Act 2003; Extradition Act 2003; Sexual Offences Act 2003; Criminal Justice Act 2003; Civil Partnership Act 2004; Serious Organised Crime and Police Act 2005; Gambling Act 2005; Animal Health and Welfare (Scotland) Act 2006 (Consequential Provisions) Order 2006; Serious Crime Act 2007; Coroners and Justice Act 2009; Housing and Regeneration Act 2008 (Consequential Provisions) Order 2010; Treaty of Lisbon (Changes in Terminology) Order 2011; Legal Aid, Sentencing and Punishment of Offenders Act 2012; Crime and Courts Act 2013; Police and Fire Reform (Scotland) Act 2012 (Consequential Provisions and Modifications) Order 2013; Criminal Justice and Courts Act 2015; Sentencing Act 2020; European Union Withdrawal (Consequential Modifications) (EU Exit) Regulations 2020

Status: Amended

Text of statute as originally enacted

Text of the Criminal Law Act 1977 as in force today (including any amendments) within the United Kingdom, from legislation.gov.uk.

The Criminal Law Act 1977 (c. 45) is an act of the Parliament of the United Kingdom. Most of it only applies to England and Wales. It creates the offence of conspiracy in English law. It also created offences concerned with criminal trespass in premises, made changes to sentencing, and created an offence of falsely reporting the existence of a bomb.

== Provisions ==
=== Part II – Offences relating to entering and remaining on property ===
This Part implemented recommendations contained in the Report on Conspiracy and Criminal Law Reform (Law Com 76) by the Law Commission.

==== Section 6 – Violence for securing entry ====
Section 6 creates an offence of using or threatening unauthorised violence for the purpose of securing entry into any premises, while there is known to be a person inside opposing entry. Violence is taken to include violence to property, as well as to people.

Section 6 is referred to in printed legal warnings, which are commonly displayed near the entrances to squatted buildings. Squatters are not protected by the Protection from Eviction Act 1977, which makes it a crime to evict tenants without following the legal process.

Laws regarding squatting residential properties were revised in the Legal Aid, Sentencing and Punishment of Offenders Act 2012.

- Section 7 – Adverse occupation of residential premises
- Section 8 – Trespassing with a weapon of offence

==== Section 9 – Trespassing on the premises of foreign missions etc ====
The purpose of this offence is to fill the lacuna that might otherwise have been left in the law by the abolition of the common law offence of conspiracy to trespass by section 5(1) of the Act.

- Section 10 – Obstruction of court officers executing process for possession against unauthorised occupiers
- Section 11 – Power of entry for the purpose of Part II of the Act
- Section 12 – Supplementary provisions

==== Section 13 – Abolitions and repeals ====
This section abolished existing offences and repealed earlier statutes that were superseded by Part II of the Act.

Subsection (1) abolished the common law offence of forcible entry and any offence at common law of forcible detainer.

Subsection (2) repealed:

- The Forcible Entry Act 1381
- The Forcible Entry Act 1391
- The Forcible Entry Act 1429
- The Forcible Entry Act 1588
- The Forcible Entry Act 1623

== Part III – Criminal procedure, penalties etc ==
This Part implemented recommendations contained in the Report of the Interdepartmental Committee on the Distribution of Criminal Business between the Crown Court and Magistrates' Courts (Cmnd 6323) (1975).

=== Section 14 – Preliminary ===
This section provided that sections 15 to 24 had effect for the purpose of securing that, as regards mode of trial, there were only three classes of offence, namely offences triable only on indictment, offences triable only summarily and offences triable either way, for laying down a single procedure applicable to all cases where a person who had attained the age of seventeen appeared or was brought before a magistrates' court on an information charging him with an offence triable either way, and for related purposes.

- Section 15 – Offences which are to become triable only summarily

=== Section 16 – Offences which are to become triable either way ===
Subsection (2) replaced section 19 of the Magistrates' Courts Act 1952. This section was replaced by section 17 of the Magistrates' Courts Act 1980.

=== Section 17 – Offence which is to become triable only on indictment ===
This section made the offence of criminal libel triable only on indictment. It did this by repealing section 5 of the Newspaper Libel and Registration Act 1881. It was repealed by the Statute Law (Repeals) Act 1993 because it was spent by virtue of section 15 of the Interpretation Act 1978.

- Section 18 – Provisions as to time limits on summary proceedings for indictable offences
- Section 19 – Initial procedure on information for offence triable either way
- Section 20 – Court to begin by considering which mode of trial appears more suitable
- Section 21 – Procedure where summary trial appears more suitable
- Section 22 – Procedure where trial on indictment appears more suitable
- Section 23 – Certain offences triable either way to be tried summarily if the value involved is small
- Section 24 – Power of court, with consent of legally represented accused, to proceed in his absence
- Section 25 – Power to change from summary trial to committal proceedings, and vice versa
- Section 26 – Power to issue summons to accused in certain circumstances
- Section 27 – General limit on power of magistrates' court to impose imprisonment
- Section 28 – Penalties on summary conviction for offences triable either way
- Section 29 – Maximum penalties on summary conviction in pursuance of section 23
- Section 30 – Penalties and mode of trial for offences made triable only summarily
- Section 31 – Increase of fines for certain summary offences
- Section 32 – Other provisions as to maximum fines
- Section 33 – Penalty for offences under section 3 of the Explosive Substances Act 1883
- Section 34 – Power of magistrates' court to remit a person under 17 for trial to a juvenile court in certain circumstances
- Section 35 – Power to commit a person under 17 for trial extended to related offences in certain cases
- Section 36 – Enforcement of fines imposed on young offenders
- Section 37 – Supervision orders
- Section 38 – Execution throughout United Kingdom of warrants of arrest
- Section 39 – Service of summonses and citation throughout the United Kingdom
- Section 40 – Transfer of fine orders
- Section 41 – Transfer of remand hearings
- Section 42 – Remand of accused already in custody
- Section 43 – Peremptory challenge of jurors
- Section 44 – Appeals against conviction
- Section 45 – Cases where magistrates' Court may remit offender to another such court for sentence
- Section 46 – Committal for sentence of offences tried summarily
- Section 47 – Prison sentence partly served and partly suspended
- Section 48 – Power to make rules as to furnishing of information by prosecutor in criminal proceedings
- Section 49 – Power to order the search of persons before the Crown Court

== Part IV – Miscellaneous provisions ==
=== Section 50 – Amendment of the Road Traffic Act 1972 ===
This section abolished the offences of causing death by dangerous driving, dangerous driving and dangerous cycling (whilst re-enacting those parts of the same provisions that referred to reckless driving and cycling).

Subsection (1) substituted sections 1 and 2 of the Road Traffic Act 1972. Subsection (2) substituted section 17 of that Act.

=== Section 51 – Bomb hoaxes ===
This section creates an offence of bomb hoaxes.

=== Section 52 – Misuse of Drugs Act 1971: redefinition of cannabis ===
This section substitutes the definition of cannabis in section 37(1) of the Misuse of Drugs Act 1971 so that it includes leaves and stalks of the plant other than mature stalk separated from the rest of the plant. It was enacted in response to the successful appeal in R v Goodchild [1977] 2 All ER 163, [1977] 1 WLR 473 for the possession of dried leaves and stalks of the plant containing cannabis resin because these could not be described as "flowering and fruiting tops" of the plant and therefore did not fall within the definition then provided.

=== Section 53 – Amendments of the Obscene Publications Act 1959 with respect to cinematograph exhibitions ===
This section amends the Obscene Publications Act 1959.

=== Section 54 – Inciting girl under sixteen to have incestuous sexual intercourse ===
See incitement.

=== Section 55 – Amendment of the Rabies Act 1974 and the Diseases of Animals (Northern Ireland) Order 1975 ===
This section amends the Rabies Act 1974 and the Diseases of Animals (Northern Ireland) Order 1975.

=== Section 56 – Coroners' inquests ===
This section implemented recommendations contained in the Report of the Committee on Death Certificates and Coroners (Cmnd 4810) (1971).

Subsection (3) substituted section 20 of the Coroners (Amendment) Act 1926. Subsection 4 repealed the City of London Fire Inquests Act 1888.

=== Section 57 – Probation and conditional discharge: power to vary statutory minimum or maximum period ===
This section amended the Powers of Criminal Courts Act 1973.

=== Section 58 – Proceedings involving persons under 17: increase of certain pecuniary limits ===
This section amended section 8(3) of the Criminal Justice Act 1961 and the Children and Young Persons Act 1969.

=== Section 59 – Alteration of maximum periods in default of payments of fines etc ===
This section substituted paragraph 1 of Schedule 3 to the Magistrates' Courts Act 1952.

=== Section 60 – Increase in maximum amount of compensation which may be awarded by a magistrates' court ===
This section amended section 35(5) of the Powers of Criminal Courts Act 1973.

== Part V ==
- Section 63 applies to Scotland

== Part VI – Supplementary ==
=== Section 65 – Citation, etc. ===
The following orders have been made under section 65(7):

- The Criminal Law Act 1977 (Commencement No. 1) Order 1977 (S.I. 1977/1365 (C. 47))
- The Criminal Law Act 1977 (Commencement No. 2) Order 1977 (S.I. 1977/1426 (C. 51))
- The Criminal Law Act 1977 (Commencement No. 3) Order 1977 (S.I. 1977/1682 (C. 58))
- The Criminal Law Act 1977 (Commencement No. 5) Order 1978 (S.I. 1978/712 (C. 16))
- The Criminal Law Act 1977 (Commencement No. 7) Order 1980 (S.I. 1980/487 (C. 17))
- The Criminal Law Act 1977 (Commencement No. 9) Order 1980 (S.I. 1980/1632 (C. 69)
- The Criminal Law Act 1977 (Commencement No. 11) Order 1982 (S.I. 1982/243 (C. 9))
- The Criminal Law Act 1977 (Commencement No. 12) Order 1985 (S.I. 1985/579 (C. 8))

== See also ==
- Criminal Law Act
