= List of acts of the Parliament of England from 1623 =

This is a list of acts of the Parliament of England for the year 1623.

For acts passed during the period 1707–1800, see the list of acts of the Parliament of Great Britain. See also the list of acts of the Parliament of Scotland, and the list of acts of the Parliament of Ireland.

For acts passed from 1801 onwards, see the list of acts of the Parliament of the United Kingdom. For acts of the devolved parliaments and assemblies in the United Kingdom, see the list of acts of the Scottish Parliament, the list of acts of the Northern Ireland Assembly, and the list of acts and measures of Senedd Cymru; see also the list of acts of the Parliament of Northern Ireland.

For medieval statutes, etc. that are not considered to be acts of Parliament, see the list of English statutes.

See also the List of ordinances and acts of the Parliament of England, 1642–1660 for ordinances and acts passed by the Long Parliament and other bodies without royal assent, and which were not considered to be valid legislation following the Restoration in 1660.

The number shown after each act's title is its chapter number. Acts are cited using this number, preceded by the years of the reign during which the relevant parliamentary session was held; thus the Union with Ireland Act 1800 is cited as "39 & 40 Geo. 3. c. 67", meaning the 67th act passed during the session that started in the 39th year of the reign of George III and which finished in the 40th year of that reign. The modern convention is to use Arabic numerals in citations (thus "41 Geo. 3" rather than "41 Geo. III"). Acts of the last session of the Parliament of Great Britain and the first session of the Parliament of the United Kingdom are both cited as "41 Geo. 3".

Acts passed by the Parliament of England did not have a short title; however, some of these acts have subsequently been given a short title by acts of the Parliament of the United Kingdom, such as the Short Titles Act 1896 (59 & 60 Vict. c. 14).

Acts passed by the Parliament of England were deemed to have come into effect on the first day of the session in which they were passed. Because of this, the years given in the list below may in fact be the year before a particular act was passed.

== 21 Jas. 1 ==
The 4th Parliament of King James I (the 'Happy Parliament') which met at Westminster from 12 February 1624 until 29 May 1624.

This session was traditionally cited as 21 Jac. 1, 21 Ja. 1, 21 James. 1 or 21 & 22 Jac. 1.

=== Public acts ===
Short title	Citation	Royal assent
Long title
Hospitals Act 1623 (repealed)	21 Jas. 1. c. 1	29 May 1624
An Act for the reviving and making perpetual of one act made in the nine and thirtieth year of the late Queen Elizabeth, intituled, "An Act for erecting of hospitals, and abiding and working houses for the poor." (Note: Hospitals for the Poor Act 1597 (39 Eliz. 1. c. 5)) (Repealed by Statute Law Revision Act 1948 (11 & 12 Geo. 6. c. 62))
Crown Suits, etc. Act 1623 (repealed)	21 Jas. 1. c. 2	29 May 1624
An Act for the general quiet of the subjects against all pretences of concealment whatsoever. (Repealed by Statute Law Revision Act 1863 (26 & 27 Vict. c. 125))
Statute of Monopolies or the Monopoly Act 1623 or the Monopoly Act 1624	21 Jas. 1. c. 3	29 May 1624
An Act concerning monopolies and dispensations with penal laws and the forfeitures thereof.
Common Informers Act 1623 (repealed)	21 Jas. 1. c. 4	29 May 1624
An Act for the case of the subject, concerning informations upon penal statutes. (Repealed by Statute Law Revision Act 1959 (7 & 8 Eliz. 2. c. 68))
Sheriffs Act 1623 (repealed)	21 Jas. 1. c. 5	29 May 1624
An Act that sheriffs, their heirs, executors and administrators, having a Quietus est, shall be absolutely discharged of their accounts. (Repealed by Statute Law Revision Act 1863 (26 & 27 Vict. c. 125))
Female Convicts Act 1623 (repealed)	21 Jas. 1. c. 6	29 May 1624
An Act concerning women convicted of small felonies. (Repealed by Statute Law Revision Act 1863 (26 & 27 Vict. c. 125))
Drunkenness Act 1623 (repealed)	21 Jas. 1. c. 7	29 May 1624
An Act for the better repressing of drunkenness, and refraining the inordinate haunting of inns, alehouses, and other victualling houses. (Repealed by Licensing Act 1872 (35 & 36 Vict. c. 94))
Certiorari Abuses Act 1623 (repealed)	21 Jas. 1. c. 8	29 May 1624
An Act to prevent and punish the abuses in procuring process and Supersedeas of the peace and good behaviour, out of his Majesty's courts at Westminster, and to prevent the abuses in procuring writs of Certiorari out of the said courts, for the removing of indictments found before justices of the peace in their general sessions. (Repealed by Administration of Justice (Miscellaneous Provisions) Act 1938 (1 & 2 Geo. 6. c. 63))
Welsh Cloths Act 1623 (repealed)	21 Jas. 1. c. 9	29 May 1624
An Act for the free trade and traffick of Welsh clothes, cottons, frines, linings and plains in and through the kingdom of England and dominion of Wales. (Repealed by Statute Law Revision Act 1863 (26 & 27 Vict. c. 125))
Laws in Wales (Amendment) Act 1623 (repealed)	21 Jas. 1. c. 10	29 May 1624
An Act of repeal of one branch of the statute made in the session of parliament holden by prorogation at Westminster the twenty-second day of January in the thirty-fourth year of the reign of King Henry the Eighth, intituled, "An Act for certain ordinances in the King's majesty's dominion and principality of Wales." (Note: Laws in Wales Act 1542 (34 & 35 Hen. 8. c. 26)) (Repealed by Statute Law Revision Act 1887 (50 & 51 Vict. c. 59))
Heron's Fish-Curing Patent Void Act 1623 (repealed)	21 Jas. 1. c. 11	29 May 1624
An Act for confirming a judgment given in chancery for the revoking and annulling of certain letters patents granted to Henry Heron, for the sole privilege of salting, drying, and packing of fish within the counties of Devon and Cornwall. (Repealed by Statute Law Revision Act 1948 (11 & 12 Geo. 6. c. 62))
Public Officers Protection Act 1623 (repealed)	21 Jas. 1. c. 12	29 May 1624
An act to enlarge and make perpetual the act made for ease in pleading against troublesome and contentious suits prosecuted against justices of the peace, mayors, constables and certain other his Majesty's officers, for the lawful execution of their office, made in the seventh year of his Majesty's most happy reign. (Note: Public Officers Protection Act 1609 (7 Jas. 1. c. 5)) (Repealed by Public Authorities Protection Act 1893 (56 & 57 Vict. c. 61))
Jeofails Act 1623 (repealed)	21 Jas. 1. c. 13	29 May 1624
An Act for the further reformation of jeofails. (Repealed by Statute Law Revision and Civil Procedure Act 1883 (46 & 47 Vict. c. 49))
Intrusions Act 1623 (repealed)	21 Jas. 1. c. 14	29 May 1624
An Act to admit the subject to plead the general issue in informations of intrusions brought on behalf of the King's majesty, and retain his possession til trial. (Repealed by Statute Law Revision Act 1958 (6 & 7 Eliz. 2. c. 46))
Forcible Entry Act 1623 (repealed)	21 Jas. 1. c. 15	29 May 1624
An Act to enable judges and justices of the peace to give restitution of possession in certain cases. (Repealed by Criminal Law Act 1977 (c. 45))
Limitation Act 1623 or the Statute of Limitations (repealed)	21 Jas. 1. c. 16	29 May 1624
An Act for limitation of actions, and for avoiding of suits in law. (Repealed by Statute Law (Repeals) Act 1986 (c. 12))
Usury Act 1623 (repealed)	21 Jas. 1. c. 17	29 May 1624
An act against usury. (Repealed by Statute Law Revision Act 1863 (26 & 27 Vict. c. 125))
Woollen Cloths Act 1623 (repealed)	21 Jas. 1. c. 18	29 May 1624
An Act for continuance of a former act made in the fourth year of the King's majesty's reign of England, &c., intituled, "An Act for the true making woolen clothes, and for some additions and alterations in and to the same." (Note: Woollen Cloths Act 1606 (4 Jas. 1. c. 2)) (Repealed by Repeal of Obsolete Statutes Act 1856 (19 & 20 Vict. c. 64))
Bankrupts Act 1623 (repealed)	21 Jas. 1. c. 19	29 May 1624
An Act for the further description of a bankrupt, and relief of creditors against such as shall become bankrupts, and for inflicting corporal punishment upon the bankrupts in some special cases. (Repealed by Bankruptcy Act 1825 (6 Geo. 4. c. 16))
Profane Swearing Act 1623 (repealed)	21 Jas. 1. c. 20	29 May 1624
An Act to prevent and reform profane swearing and cursing. (Repealed by Profane Oaths Act 1745 (19 Geo. 2. c. 21))
Horsebread Act 1623 (repealed)	21 Jas. 1. c. 21	29 May 1624
An Act concerning Hostlers and Inn-holders. (Repealed by Repeal of Obsolete Statutes Act 1856 (19 & 20 Vict. c. 64))
Butter and Cheese Act 1623 (repealed)	21 Jas. 1. c. 22	29 May 1624
An Act for the explanation of the statutes made in the third, fourth and fifth years of King Edward the Sixth, concerning the traders of butter and cheese. (Note: Butter and Cheese Act 1549 (3 & 4 Edw. 6. c. 21)) (Note: Forestallers Act 1551 (5 & 6 Edw. 6. c. 14)) (Repealed by Statute Law Revision Act 1863 (26 & 27 Vict. c. 125))
Inferior Courts Act 1623 (repealed)	21 Jas. 1. c. 23	29 May 1624
An Act for avoiding of vexations delays caused by removing actions and suits out of inferior courts. (Repealed by Statute Law Revision Act 1948 (11 & 12 Geo. 6. c. 62))
Execution Act 1623 (repealed)	21 Jas. 1. c. 24	29 May 1624
An Act for the relief of creditors against such persons as die in execution. (Repealed by Statute Law Revision Act 1948 (11 & 12 Geo. 6. c. 62))
Crown Lands Act 1623	21 Jas. 1. c. 25	29 May 1624
An Act for the relief of patentees, tenants and farmers of crown-lands and duchy-lands, or of lands within the survey of the court of wards and liveries, in cases of forfeiture for not payment of their rents, or other service or duty.
Fines and Recoveries Act 1623 (repealed)	21 Jas. 1. c. 26	29 May 1624
An Act against such as shall levy any fine, suffer any recovery, knowledge any stature, recognizance, bail, or judgment, in the name of any other person or persons not being privy and consenting thereto. (Repealed by Forgery Act 1830 (11 Geo. 4. & 1 Will. 4. c. 66))
Concealment of Birth of Bastards Act 1623 (repealed)	21 Jas. 1. c. 27	29 May 1624
An Act to prevent the destroying and murthering of bastard children. (Repealed by Malicious Shooting or Stabbing Act 1803 (43 Geo. 3. c. 58))
Continuance, etc. of Laws Act 1623 (repealed)	21 Jas. 1. c. 28	29 May 1624
An Act for continuing and reviving divers statutes, and repeal of divers others. (Repealed by Statute Law Revision Act 1863 (26 & 27 Vict. c. 125))
Duchy of Cornwall Act 1623 (repealed)	21 Jas. 1. c. 29	29 May 1624
An Act to enable the most excellent prince Charles to make leases of lands, parcel of his Highness duchy of Cornwall, or annexed to the same. (Repealed by Statute Law Revision Act 1948 (11 & 12 Geo. 6. c. 62))
Exchange of Lands (King and Archbishop of York) Act 1623 (repealed)	21 Jas. 1. c. 30	29 May 1624
An Act for a messuage, called York-house, (Note: York House, Strand.) and other tenements belonging to the archbishop of York, assured to the King's majesty and his successors, in exchange of several manors, &c. in the county of York, given to Toby, (Note: Tobias Matthew.) archbishop of York, and his succesors. (Repealed by Statute Law (Repeals) Act 1978 (c. 45)))
Cutlers' Company's Act 1623 or the Hallamshire Cutlers Act 1623	21 Jas. 1. c. 31	29 May 1624
An Act for incorporating the makers of knives and other cutlery wares in Hallamshire in the county of York.
Thames Navigation Act 1623 (repealed)	21 Jas. 1. c. 32	29 May 1624
An Act for making the river of Thames navigable for barges, boats and lighters, from the village of Bercot, in the county of Oxon, unto the university and city of Oxon. (Repealed by Thames Conservancy Act 1894 (57 & 58 Vict. c. clxxxvii))
Taxation Act 1623 (repealed)	21 Jas. 1. c. 33	29 May 1624
An Act for four intire subsidies granted by the spirituality. (Repealed by Statute Law Revision Act 1863 (26 & 27 Vict. c. 125))
Taxation (No. 2) Act 1623 (repealed)	21 Jas. 1. c. 34	29 May 1624
An Act for three intire subsidies and three fifteens and tenths granted by the temporalty. (Repealed by Statute Law Revision Act 1863 (26 & 27 Vict. c. 125))
Act of General Pardon 1623 (repealed)	21 Jas. 1. c. 35	29 May 1624
A confirmation of the King's general and free pardon. (Repealed by Statute Law Revision Act 1863 (26 & 27 Vict. c. 125))

=== Private acts ===
Short title	Citation	Royal assent
Long title
Wadham College Oxford Act 1623	21 Jas. 1. c. 1 Pr.	29 May 1624
An Act for the confirmation of Wadham college in Oxford, and the possessions thereof.
Naturalization of Philip Burlemacchi Act 1623	21 Jas. 1. c. 2 Pr.	29 May 1624
An Act for the naturalizing of Philip Burlemacchi of London, merchant.
Naturalization of Giles Vandeputt Act 1623	21 Jas. 1. c. 3 Pr.	29 May 1624
An Act for the naturalizing of Giles Vandeputt of London, merchant.
Earl of Hertford and Sir Francis Seymour: sale of lands for payment of debts, and establishment of others in lieu and of better value.	21 Jas. 1. c. 4 Pr.	29 May 1624
An act to enable William earl of Hereford, and sir Francis Seymour, knight, brother of the said earl, to convey certain lands for payment of his debts, and for establishing of other lands in lieu thereof, and of better value.
Naturalization of Sir Robert Anstrother, Sir George Abercromy and John Cragge Act 1623	21 Jas. 1. c. 5 Pr.	29 May 1624
An ad for the naturalizing of sir Robert Anstrother, knight, one of the gentlemen of his Majesty's privy-chamber, sir George Abercromy, knight, late gentleman of the robes to the late Queen Anne of worthy memory, and John Cragge, doctor of physick, physician to the high and mighty prince Charles, your Majesty's dearest son.
Manors of Stepney and Hackney, confirmation of copyholders' rights.	21 Jas. 1. c. 6 Pr.	29 May 1624
An act for confirmation of the copyhold estates and customs of divers copyholders of the manors of Stepney and Hackney, according to certain indentures of agreement, and a decree in the high court of chancery, made between the lord of the said manors and the copyholders.
Confirmation of sale of lands by Sir Thomas and Dame Elizabeth Beamond to Sir Thomas Checke.	21 Jas. 1. c. 7 Pr.	29 May 1624
An act for confirmation of the assurance of certain lands sold by sir Thomas Beamond, knight and baronet, lord viscount Beaumond of Swoords in the kingdom of Ireland, and dame Elizabeth his wife, unto sir Thomas Cheeke, knight.
Middlecott's Charities Act 1623	21 Jas. 1. c. 8 Pr.	29 May 1624
An Act for erecting a free school, (Note: Free Grammar School, Kirkton.) an almshouse, (Note: Middlecott Hospital, Fosdyke.) and an house of correction within the county of Lincoln.
Martin Calthrope's Estate Act 1623	21 Jas. 1. c. 9 Pr.	29 May 1624
An Act to enable Martin Calthrope, esquire, to make sale of certain lands for preferment of younger children, and payment of his debts.
Assurance of manor of Goodneston and other lands of Sir Edward Engham.	21 Jas. 1. c. 10 Pr.	29 May 1624
An act for the settling and assuring of the manor of Goodneston, and other lands of sir Edward Engham, knight.
Naturalization of Elizabeth and Mary Vere.	21 Jas. 1. c. 11 Pr.	29 May 1624
An act for the naturalizing of Elizabeth Veere and Maty Veere, daughters of sir Horace Veere, knight.
Alice Dudley's Estate Act 1623	21 Jas. 1. c. 12 Pr.	29 May 1624
An act to enabled Alice Dudley, wife of sir Robert Dudley, knight, to assure her estate in the manor of Killingworth, and other lands in the county of Warwick, for valuable consideration, to the prince's highness and his heirs.
Confirmation of exchange of lands between Prince Charles and Sir Lewis Watson.	21 Jas. 1. c. 13 Pr.	29 May 1624
An act for confirmattion of an exchange of lands between the most excellent prince Charles and sir Lewis Watson, knight and baronet.
Viscount Montagu's Estate Act 1623	21 Jas. 1. c. 14 Pr.	29 May 1624
An act for the settling of certain manors and lands of the right honourable Anthony viscount Mountague, towards the payment of his debts and raising of his daughter's portions.
Sir Richard Lumley's Estate Act 1623	21 Jas. 1. c. 15 Pr.	29 May 1624
An act to enable sir Richard Lumley, knight, to sell divers manors and lands for the payment of his debts, and preferment of his younger children.
Manor of Painswick Act 1623	21 Jas. 1. c. 16 Pr.	29 May 1624
An act for the confirmation of a decree in chancery, made by the consent of the lord of the manor of Painswick in the county of Gloucester, and the customary tenants of the same manor.
Naturalization of Sir Francis Stewart, Walter Maxwell, William Carr and James Levingston Act 1623	21 Jas. 1. c. 17 Pr.	29 May 1624
An act for the naturalizing of sir Francis Stewart, knight, Walter Stewart, James Maxwell, William Carr, and James Levingston, esquires.
Naturalization of John Young Act 1623	21 Jas. 1. c. 18 Pr.	29 May 1624
An act for the naturalizing of John Younge doctor of divinity, and dean of the cathedral church of Winchester.
Conveyance of manor of Little Munden (Hertfordshire) by Sir Peter Vanlore and Sir Charles and Dame Anne Cesar to Edmund Woodhall.	21 Jas. 1. c. 19 Pr.	29 May 1624
An Act to enable and make good a Conveyance and Assurance made of the Manor of Little Munden in the County of Hertford by Sir Peter Vanlore, Knight, (Note: Peter Vanlore) Sir Charles Cesar, Knight, and Dame Anne his Wife, to Edmund Woodhall, Esquire, and his Heirs; and to establish the said Manor upon the said Edmund Woodhall and his Heirs, according to the said Conveyance.
Naturalization of Jane Murrey and William Murrey Act 1623	21 Jas. 1. c. 20 Pr.	29 May 1624
An Act for the naturalizing of Jane Marrey Widdowe and William Murrey Esquire.
Vincent Lowe's Estate Act 1623	21 Jas. 1. c. 21 Pr.	29 May 1624
An Act to enable Vincent Lowe of Denbigh in the County of Derby, Esquire, to sell Part of his Lands for Payment of his Debts
Toby Pallavicine's Estate Act 1623	21 Jas. 1. c. 22 Pr.	29 May 1624
An Act to enable Tobie Pallivicine, Esquire, to sell certain Lands for the Payment of his Debts and Preferment of his younger Children.
Naturalization of Sir Robert Carre Act 1623	21 Jas. 1. c. 23 Pr.	29 May 1624
An Act for naturalizing Sir Robert Carr Knight.
Assurance of manors of Newlangport and Sevans or Sephans and other lands in Kent, late the inheritance of Sir Henry James, convicted in a praemunire, to Martin Lumley, Alice Woodroffe and Edward Cropley.	21 Jas. 1. c. 24 Pr.	29 May 1624
An Act for the confirming and assuring of the Manor of Newlangport and Sevans alias Sephans with their Appurtenances, and divers other Lands, Tenements and Hereditaments in the County of Kent, late being the Inheritance of Sir Henry James, Knight, in a Pramunire convicted, unto Martin Lumley, now the Mayor of the City of London, Alice Woodroofe, Widow, and Edward Cropley, and their Heirs and Assigns for ever.
Naturalization of Stephen Leisure Act 1623	21 Jas. 1. c. 25 Pr.	29 May 1624
An Acte for the naturalizing of Stephen Leisieur Knight.
Naturalization of the Marquis of Hamilton Act 1623	21 Jas. 1. c. 26 Pr.	29 May 1624
An Acte for the naturalizing of James Marquesse of Hamilton.
Naturalization of Sir William Anstrother, Walter Bellcanquall and Patrick Abercromy Act 1623	21 Jas. 1. c. 27 Pr.	29 May 1624
An Act for the naturalizing of Sir William Anstrother Knight Walter Balcanquall Doctor of Divinity and Patricke Abercomby.
Sir Edward Heron's Estate Act 1623	21 Jas. 1. c. 28 Pr.	29 May 1624
An Act for the confirming the Sale of certain Land sold by Sir Edward Heron, Knight, unto Bevell Moulesworth, Esquire, and enabling the said Sir Edward Heron to make Sale of other Lands for Payment of Debts, and settling of certain Manors, Salt Marshes and other Lands upon Robert Heron and Edward Heron, in Recompence of the same.
Naturalization of Abigail and William Little Act 1623	21 Jas. 1. c. 29 Pr.	29 May 1624
An Act for the Naturalizing of Abigall Little, Wife of Jeoffrey Little; and William Little, Son of the said Abigall Little by the said Jeoffrey Little.
John Mohun's Estate Act 1623	21 Jas. 1. c. 30 Pr.	29 May 1624
An Act for establishing of some Manors and other Lands in the several Counties of Cornwall, Devon and Dorsett, on John Mohun, Esquire, Son and Heir apparent of Sir Reynold Mohun, Knight and Baronet, according to the true Intent and Meaning of certain Agreements between them had and made.
Edward Alcocke's Estate Act 1623	21 Jas. 1. c. 31 Pr.	29 May 1624
An Act for the enabling of the Sale of the Manor of Rampton in the County of Cambridge, and of divers Lands and Tenements in Rampton, Wivellingham (Note: Wivelingham.) and Cottingham (Note: Cottenham.) in the same County, now or late the Freehold or Inheritance of Edward Alcocke, Esquire.
Bishop of Coventry and Lichfield's Estate Act 1623	21 Jas. 1. c. 32 Pr.	29 May 1624
An Act of Explanation of a former Act made in the three and twentieth Year of the Reign of the late Queen of famous Memory Elizabeth, intituled, "An Act for Assurance of the yearly Rent of eighty two Pounds and ten Shillings to the Bishop of Coventry and Litchfield" and his Successors for ever, out of certain Manors, Lands, Tenements and Hereditaments thereby assured to Edward Fisher, Esquire, and his Heirs." (Note: Bishop of Coventry and Lichfield's Estate Act 1580 (23 Eliz. 1. c. 5 Pr.))
Establishment of Thomas Whetenhall's lectures in divinity.	21 Jas. 1. c. 33 Pr.	29 May 1624
An Act for the establishing of three Lectures in Divinitie according to the last Will and Testament of Thomas Whetenhall Esquire.
Colchester Improvement Act 1623	21 Jas. 1. c. 34 Pr.	29 May 1624
An Act for the payringe and mainteyninge of the Haven River and Channell runing unto the Borowgh and Towne of Colchester in the Countie of Essex, and alsoe for the paveing of the said Towne.
Sir Francis Clerke's Estate Act 1623	21 Jas. 1. c. 35 Pr.	29 May 1624
An Act to enable Sir Frauncis Clerke Knight to make Sale of certaine Lands Tennements and Hereditaments for the Payment of his Debts and providing of Portions for his younger Children.
Sir John Rivers' Estate Act 1623	21 Jas. 1. c. 36 Pr.	29 May 1624
An Act for the altering of the Tenure and Custom of the Lands late of Thomas Potter, Esquire, and the Lands of Sir George Rivers, Knight, and Sir John Rivers, Baronet, lying all in the County of Kent, and being now of the Nature of Gavelkind, and to make them descendible according to the Course of the Common Law, and to settle the Inheritance of them upon the said Sir John Rivers, and the Heirs of the said Sir John Rivers and Dame Dorothy his Wife.
Earl of Middlesex's Estate Act 1623	21 Jas. 1. c. 37 Pr.	29 May 1624
An Act to make the Landes of Lyonell Earle of Middlesex subject to the payment of his Debtes, &c.
Sir James Pointz's Estate Act 1623	21 Jas. 1. c. 38 Pr.	29 May 1624
An Act for the Sale of the Manor of Abbots Hall in the County of Essex, late Part of the Possessions of Sir James Pointz, Knight, deceased, to the Intent that the Money raised thereby may be distributed among the Creditors of the said Sir James Pointz, according to the Direction and Intention of the said Sir James Pointz by his last Will and Testament.

=== Sources ===
- Raithby, John, ed. (1963) [1819]. "21° Jac.". Statutes of the Realm. Vol. 4 Part 2: The Statutes of Queen Elizabeth (An. 28-43) and of King James (1586–1623). London: Dawsons. pp. 1209–1275 – via HathiTrust.
- Raithby, John, ed. (1963) [1819]. "21° Jac.". Statutes of the Realm. Vol. 4 Part 2: The Statutes of Queen Elizabeth (An. 28-43) and of King James (1586–1623). London: Dawsons. p. 1209-1275 – via Google Books.
- Raithby, John, ed. (1963) [1819]. "21° Jac.". Statutes of the Realm. Vol. 4 Part 2: The Statutes of Queen Elizabeth (An. 28-43) and of King James (1586–1623). London: Dawsons. p. 1209-1275 – via Internet Archive.
- Pickering, Danby, ed. (1763). "Anno vicesimo primo Jacobi". The Statutes at Large. Vol. 7: From the Thirty-ninth Year of Q. Elizabeth to the Twelfth Year of K. Charles. Inclusive. Cambridge: Joseph Bentham. pp. 250–314 – via Internet Archive.
- Journal of the House of Commons. Vol. 1 – 1547-1629. His Majesty's Stationery Office. 1802 – via British History Online.
- Journal of the House of Lords. Vol. 3: 1620-1628. London: His Majesty's Stationery Office. 1830 – via British History Online.
- Chronological Table of and Index to the Statutes. Vol. 1: To the End of the Session 59 Vict. Sess. 2 (1895) (13th ed.). London: Her Majesty's Stationery Office. 1896. pp. 66–67 – via Google Books.
- Chronological Table of the Statutes: Covering the Period from 1235 to the End of 1971. London: Her Majesty's Stationery Office. 1972. pp. 64–65. ISBN 978-0-11-840096-1 – via Google Books.
- "Acts of the English Parliament from 1623". legislation.gov.uk. The National Archives.
- "Chronological Tables of the Private and Personal Acts: Part 2 (1603–1640)". legislation.gov.uk. The National Archives.

== See also ==
- List of acts of the Parliament of England
