= Continuance, etc. of Laws Act 1623 =

Act of the Parliament of England

- Act of Parliament
- Parliament of England
- Long title: An Act for continuing and reviving divers statutes, and repeal of divers others.
- Citation: 21 Jas. 1. c. 28
- Territorial extent: England and Wales

Dates
- Royal assent: 29 May 1624
- Commencement: 19 February 1624 (Note: Start of session.)
- Repealed: 28 July 1863

Other legislation
- Amends: See § Revived and continued enactments
- Repeals/revokes: See § Repealed enactments
- Repealed by: Statute Law Revision Act 1863
- Relates to: See Expiring laws continuance acts

Status: Repealed

Text of statute as originally enacted

The Continuance, etc. of Laws Act 1623 (21 Jas. 1. c. 28) was an act of the Parliament of England that continued, revived and repealed various older acts.

== Background ==
In the United Kingdom, acts of Parliament remain in force until expressly repealed. Statute law revision gained a new momentum following the Union of the Crowns in 1603. Speaking in Parliament in 1609, King James I, proposing reform to the statutes, speaking from the throne of:

"divers cross and cuffing statutes, and some so penned that they may be taken in divers, yea, contrary senses... therefore would I wish both these statutes and reports, as well in the Parliament as common law, to be once maturely reviewed and reconciled; and that not only all contrarieties should be scraped out of our bookes, but even that such penal statutes as were made but for the use of the time (from breach whereof not man can be free) which dos not now agree with the condition of this our time, might likewise be left out of our bookes, which under a tyrannous or avaricious king could not be endured. And this reformation might (me thinkes) bee made a worthy worke, and well deserves a Parliament to be set of purpose for it"

In 1616, Sir Francis Bacon, then Attorney General, submitted to King James I a proposal "touching the compiling and amendment of the laws of England", proposing four steps:

The first is to discharge the books of those statutes whereas the case by alteration of time is vanished, as Lombards, Jews, Gauls, halfpence, &c. Those may, nevertheless, remain in the libraries for antiquities, but no reprinting of them. The like of statutes long since expired and clearly repealed; for if the repeal be doubtful, it must be so propounded to Parliament.

The next is to repeal all statutes which are sleeping and not of use, but yet snaring and in force. In some of those it will perhaps be requisite to substitute some more reasonable law instead of them, agreeable to the time; in others a simple repeal may suffice.

The third, that the grievousness of the penalty in many statutes may be mitigated, though the ordinance stand.

The last is the reducing of convenient statutes heaped one upon another to one clear and uniform law."

Lord Bacon's fall from grace in 1621, as well as other more immediate priorities on the parliamentary agenda, meant that his attempts at the revision of the statute law were not pursued. Despite this, parliament recognised the need to organise and clarify the statute book, ensuring that obsolete and contradictory laws did not remain in force, aligning with broader legal reforms sought by King James I.

== Provisions ==
Section 2 of the act provided that the acts affected by this act may be amended in the present parliamentary session.

Section 3 of the act permitted the exportation of grains (wheat, rye, peas, beans, barley, and malt) when their prices do not exceed specified thresholds, establishing customs duties on exported grain (two shillings per quarter on wheat and sixteen pence per quarter on other grains) and allowing subjects to transport and sell these commodities both domestically and internationally.

Section 4 of the act grants the King, his heirs, and successors the authority to temporarily prohibit grain exports from all or specific ports of the realm through a published proclamation, with violations subject to existing legal penalties, regardless of other provisions in the act.

Section 5 of the act exempted penalties for deficiencies in length, breadth, or weight of Welsh cottons priced under fifteen pence per yard or two shillings per goad, provided they are not mixed with hair or other deceptive materials, do not shrink more than half a yard per twelve yards in length, weigh at least fourteen ounces per yard, and measure at least three-quarters of a yard in width.

=== Revived and continued enactments ===
Section 1 of the act continued 62 enactments, listed in that section, extending their validity from the seventh year of King James's reign (1610) until the end of the first session of the next parliament.

Citation	Short title	Description	Extent of continuation
21 Hen. 8. c. 12	Manufacture of Cables, etc. Act 1529	One act made in the one and twentieth year of the reign of the late King Henry the Eighth, intituled, An act for the true making of cables, halsers and ropes.	The whole act.
24 Hen. 8. c. 9	Killing Weanlings Act 1532	An act made in the four and twentieth year of the reign of the said late Henry the Eighth, intituled, An act against killing of young beasts called weanlings.	The whole act.
3 & 4 Edw. 6. c. 19	Buying Cattle Act 1549	Two acts made in the parliament holden at Westminster by prorogation the fourth day of November, in the first year of the reign of the late King Edward the Sixth; in the third and fourth years of the reign of the late King Edward the Sixth; the one intituled, An act for the buying and selling of rother-beasts and cattle.	The whole act.
3 & 4 Edw. 6. c. 21	Butter and Cheese Act 1549	Two acts made in the parliament holden at Westminster by prorogation the fourth day of November, in the first year of the reign of the late King Edward the Sixth; in the third and fourth years of the reign of the late King Edward the Sixth; the other intituled, An act for the buying and selling of butter and cheese	The whole act.
1 Eliz. 1. c. 17	Fisheries Act 1558	One act made in the first year of the reign of the late Queen Elizabeth, intituled, An act for the preservation of spawn and fry of fish.	The whole act.
5 Eliz. 1. c. 7	Importation Act 1562	An act made in the fifth year of the reign of the late Queen Elizabeth, intituled, An act for avoiding divers foreign wares made by handicraftsmen beyond the seas.	The whole act.
5 Eliz. 1. c. 5	Maintenance of the Navy Act 1562	So much of one act made in the said fifth year of the reign of the said late Queen Elizabeth, intituled, An act touching certain politick constitutions made for the maintenance of the navy.	As is not repealed by any other statutes, nor doth concern the transportation of herring in casks fish, nor freedom of dressing, taking or conveying to the same, nor transportation of corn, nor the prohibiting the bringing into this realm any eel or lings in barrels, or barrelled fish; together with all and every other additions, explanations and alterations made thereunto or thereof, or of any part thereof, by any statute or statutes made since the making of the said last mentioned act, and in force the last day of the session of parliament that was in the seventh year of his Majesty's reign of England.
8 Eliz. 1. c. 10	Bows Act 1566	An act made in the eighth year of the reign of the said late Queen Elizabeth, intituled, An act for bowyers, and the prices of bows.	The whole act.
13 Eliz. 1. c. 21	Purveyance Act 1571	Three acts made in the thirteenth year of her said Majesty's reign, one intituled, An act that purveyors may take grain and victuals within five miles of Cambridge and Oxford in certain cases.	The whole act.
13 Eliz. 1. c. 10	Ecclesiastical Leases Act 1571	Three acts made in the thirteenth year of her said Majesty's reign, one other, An act against frauds defeating remedies for dilapidations of ecclesiastical livings, and for leases to be granted to the collegiate churches.	The whole act.
13 Eliz. 1. c. 20	Benefices Act 1571	Three acts made in the thirteenth year of her said Majesty's reign, another intituled, An act touching leases of benefices, and other ecclesiastical livings with cure.	The whole act.
14 Eliz. 1. c. 11	Ecclesiastical Leases Act 1572	Together with all and every explanations, additions and alterations made thereof, or of any of them, or to any of them, made by several statutes in the fourteenth, eighteenth and three and fortieth year of her late Majesty's reign.	The whole act.
18 Eliz. 1. c. 11	Ecclesiastical Leases Act 1575	Together with all and every explanations, additions and alterations made thereof, or of any of them, or to any of them, made by several statutes in the fourteenth, eighteenth and three and fortieth year of her late Majesty's reign.	The whole act.
43 Eliz. 1. c. 9	Continuance, etc. of Laws Act 1601	Together with all and every explanations, additions and alterations made thereof, or of any of them, or to any of them, made by several statutes in the fourteenth, eighteenth and three and fortieth year of her late Majesty's reign.	The whole act.
14 Eliz. 1. c. 5	Vagabonds Act 1572	An act made in the fourteenth year of the reign of the late Queen Elizabeth, intituled, An act for the punishment of vagabonds, and for the relief of the poor and impotent.	As concerneth the taxing, rating, levying, receiving and imploying of goal-money.
18 Eliz. 1. c. 3	Poor Act 1575	An act made in the eighteenth year of the reign of the said late Queen Elizabeth, intituled, An act to redress the poor to work, and avoiding idleness.	As concerneth bastards begotten and born out of lawful matrimony.
18 Eliz. 1. c. 20	Road Repairs (Oxford) Act 1575	An act made in the said eighteenth year of the reign of the said late Queen Elizabeth, intituled, An act for the repairing and amending of the bridges and highways near unto the city of Oxford.	The whole act.
27 Eliz. 1. c. 1 Pr. (Note: This is the citation in The Statutes of the Realm.) 27 Eliz. 1. c. 19 Pr. (Note: This is the citation in The Statutes at Large.)	Lyme Regis Pier Act 1584	Two acts made in the seven and twentieth year of the reign of the said late Queen Elizabeth, the one intituled, An act for the maintenance of the pier and cobb of Lyme-Regis in the county of Dorset.	The whole act.
27 Eliz. 1. c. 5 Pr. (Note: Also listed as 27 Eliz. c. 31.) (Note: This is the citation in The Statutes of the Realm.) 27 Eliz. 1. c. 17 Pr. (Note: This is the citation in The Statutes at Large.)	Government of the City of Westminster Act 1584	Two acts made in the seven and twentieth year of the reign of the said late Queen Elizabeth, the other intituled, An act for the good government of the city and borough of Westminster	The whole act.
27 Eliz. 1. c. 14	Malt Act 1584	Two other acts made in the said seven and twentieth year of the reign of the said late Queen Elizabeth, the one intituled, An act for the reviving of a former statute for the true making of malt.	The whole act.
27 Eliz. 1. c. 24	Norfolk Coast Sea Defences Act 1584	Two other acts made in the said seven and twentieth year of the reign of the said late Queen Elizabeth, the other intituled, An act for the keeping of mills and salt-works in the county of Norfolk.	The whole act.
31 Eliz.	Sale of Beer Act 1588	An act made in the one and thirtieth year of her late Majesty's reign, intituled, An act for the true gauging of vessels brought from beyond the seas, converted by brewers for the utterance and sale of ale and beer.	The whole act.
35 Eliz. 1. c. 10	Cloth Act 1592	Two acts made in the five and thirtieth year of her said late Majesty's reign, the one intituled, An act for the reformation of sundry abuses in clothes called Devonshire kersies or dozens, according to a proclamation of the four and thirtieth year of her said Majesty's reign.	The whole act.
35 Eliz. 1. c. 11	Clapboard Act 1592	Two acts made in the five and thirtieth year of her said late Majesty's reign, the other intituled, An act for the bringing in of clapboards from the parts beyond the seas, and the refreshing of the transporting of wine casks, for the sparing and preserving of timber within the realm.	The whole act.
35 Eliz. 1. c. 1	Religion Act 1592	One act made in the five and thirtieth year of the reign of the said late Queen Elizabeth, intituled, An act to retain the Queen's subjects in their due obedience.	As hath not been sithence repealed by any other statute.
39 Eliz. 1. c. 4	Vagabonds Act 1597	The several acts hereafter mentioned, made in the thirty ninth year of the reign of the said late Queen Elizabeth, that is to say, an act intituled, An act for the punishment of rogues, vagabonds and sturdy beggars, with the provision annexed thereunto by one act made in the first year of the King's majesty's reign that now is, intituled, An act for the continuing and reviving of divers statutes, and for repealing of some others.	The whole act.
39 Eliz. 1. c. 10	Navigation Act 1597	The several acts hereafter mentioned, made in the thirty ninth year of the reign of the said late Queen Elizabeth, that is to say, an act intituled, An act intituled, An act for the increase of mariners, and for maintenance of navigation, repealing a former act made in the twenty-third year of her said Majesty's reign, bearing the same title.	The whole act.
39 Eliz. 1. c. 12	Labourers Act 1597	The several acts hereafter mentioned, made in the thirty ninth year of the reign of the said late Queen Elizabeth, that is to say, an act intituled, An act, intituled, An act for the explanation of the statute made in the fifth year of her said Majesty's reign, concerning labourers	The whole act.
39 Eliz. 1. c. 14	Importation Act 1597	The several acts hereafter mentioned, made in the thirty ninth year of the reign of the said late Queen Elizabeth, that is to say, an act intituled, An act intituled, An act prohibiting the bringing into this realm of foreign cards for wool.	The whole act.
39 Eliz. 1. c. 16	Malt Act 1597	The several acts hereafter mentioned, made in the thirty ninth year of the reign of the said late Queen Elizabeth, that is to say, an act intituled, An act intituled, An act for excessive making of malt.	The whole act.
39 Eliz. 1. c. 17	Vagabonds (No. 2) Act 1597	The several acts hereafter mentioned, made in the thirty ninth year of the reign of the said late Queen Elizabeth, that is to say, an act intituled, An act intituled, An act intituled, An act against lewd and wandering persons, pretending to be soldiers or mariners.	The whole act.
43 Eliz. 1. c. 3	Disabled Soldiers Act 1601	Several acts hereafter mentioned, made in the three and fortieth year of the reign of the said late Queen Elizabeth, that is to say, An act intituled, An act for the necessary relief of soldiers and mariners.	The whole act.
43 Eliz. 1. c. 6	Frivolous Suits Act 1601	Several acts hereafter mentioned, made in the three and fortieth year of the reign of the said late Queen Elizabeth, that is to say, An act intituled, An act to avoid trifling and frivolous suits in lawin her Majesty's courts at Westminster.	The whole act.
43 Eliz. 1. c. 2	Poor Relief Act 1601	Several acts hereafter mentioned, made in the three and fortieth year of the reign of the said late Queen Elizabeth, that is to say, An act intituled, An act for the relief of the poor, with the addition thereunto made by an act made in the fifth year of his Majesty's reign of England, intituled, An act for continuing divers statutes, and for the repeal of some others.	The whole act.
N/A	N/A	And with this further addition, and be it enacted, That all persons to whom the overseers of the poor shall, according to the said act, bind any children apprentices, may take and receive, and keep them as apprentices; any former statute to the contrary notwithstanding.	The whole act.
43 Eliz. 1. c. 10	Woollen Cloth Act 1601	Several acts hereafter mentioned, made in the three and fortieth year of the reign of the said late Queen Elizabeth, that is to say, An act, intituled, An act for the true making and working of woolen cloth.	The whole act.
43 Eliz. 1. c. 5	Inferior Court Act 1601	Several acts hereafter mentioned, made in the three and fortieth year of the reign of the said late Queen Elizabeth, that is to say, An act, intituled, An act to prevent perjury and subornation of perjury, and unnecessary expences in suits of law.	The whole act.
1 Jac. 1. c. 6	Labourers Act 1603	The several acts made in the first year of the reign of our now sovereign lord the King, after mentioned; one intituled, An act made for the explanation of the statute made in the fifth year of the late Queen Elizabeth's reign, concerning labourers.	The whole act.
1 Jac. 1. c. 7	Vagabonds Act 1603	The several acts made in the first year of the reign of our now sovereign lord the King, after mentioned; another intituled, An act for the continuance and explanation of the statute made in the nine and thirtieth year of the reign of the late Queen Elizabeth, intituled, An act for punishment of rogues, vagabonds and sturdy beggars	The whole act.
1 Jac. 1. c. 8	Statute of Stabbing 1603	The several acts made in the first year of the reign of our now sovereign lord the King, after mentioned; another intituled, An act to take away the benefit of clergy, for some kind of manslaughter.	The whole act.
1 Jac. 1. c. 9	Inns Act 1603	The several acts made in the first year of the reign of our now sovereign lord the King, after mentioned; another intituled, An act to restrain the inordinate haunting and tipling in inns, alehouses and other victualling-houses.	The whole act.
1 Jac. 1. c. 18	Hops Act 1603	The several acts made in the first year of the reign of our now sovereign lord the King, after mentioned; another intituled, An act for avoiding deceit in selling of barked leather made of horse-hides and bull-hides.	The whole act.
1 Jac. 1. c. 22	Leather Act 1603	The several acts made in the first year of the reign of our now sovereign lord the King, after mentioned; another act, intituled, An act concerning tanners, curriers, shoemakers and other artificers occupying the cutting of leather.	Saving for such part thereof as is repealed by one other act made in the fourth year of his Majesty's reign of England, in that behalf. (Note: Leather Act 1606 (4 Jac. 1. c. 6))
1 Jac. 1. c. 27	Game Act 1603	The several acts made in the first year of the reign of our now sovereign lord the King, after mentioned; another, intituled, An act for the better execution of the intent and meaning of former statutes made against shooting in guns, and for the preservation of game of pheasant and partridge, and against the destroying of hares with-hare-pipes, and tracing hares in the snow.	The whole act.
1 Jac. 1. c. 31	Plague Act 1603	The several acts made in the first year of the reign of our now sovereign lord the King, after mentioned; nother, intituled, An act for the charitable relief, and ordering of persons infected with the plague:.	The whole act.
3 Jac. 1. 8	Execution Act 1605	The several acts made in the third year of the reign of our said sovereign lord King James after mentioned, the one intituled, An act for avoiding unnecessary delays of execution.	The whole act.
3 Jac. 1. c. 9	Skinners Act 1605	The several acts made in the third year of the reign of our said sovereign lord King James after mentioned; another, intituled, An act for the relief of such as lawfully use the trade and handicraft of skinners.	The whole act.
3 Jac. 1. 10	Conveyance of Offenders to Gaol Act 1605	The several acts made in the third year of the reign of our said sovereign lord King James after mentioned; another, intituled, An act for the rating and levying of the charges for conveying malefactors and offenders to the gaol.	The whole act.
3 Jac. 1. 11	Exportation Act 1605	The several acts made in the third year of the reign of our said sovereign lord King James after mentioned; another act, intituled, An act for transportation of beer over the seas.	The whole act.
3 Jac. 1. c. 19	Highways at Long Ditton Act 1605	The several acts made in the third year of the reign of our said sovereign lord King James after mentioned; another, intituled, An act for repairing of the highway from Norwich to Thetford, in the parishes of Ewell and Long-Ditton in the county of Surrey, leading to Kingston upon Thames in the county aforesaid.	The whole act.
4 Jac. 1. c. 2	Woollen Cloths Act 1606	The several acts made in the fourth year of the reign of our now sovereign lord King James after mentioned, the one intituled, An act for the true making of woolen clothes.	The whole act.
4 Jac. 1. c. 5	Drunkenness Act 1606	The several acts made in the fourth year of the reign of our now sovereign lord King James after mentioned; another intituled, An act for the repressing the odious and loathsome sin of drunkenness.	The whole act.
4 Jac. 1. c. 11	Land Inclosure (Herefordshire) Act 1606	The several acts made in the fourth year of the reign of our now sovereign lord King James after mentioned; another, intituled, An act for the better preservation of meadow and pasture, for the needful maintenance of husbandry and tillage in the manors, lordships and parishes of Marsden, alias Mawarden, Bodenham, Wellington, Sutton St. Michael, Sutton St. Nicholas, Murston upon Lugge, and the parish of Pipe and every of them, in the county of Hereford.	The whole act.
7 Jac. 1. c. 1	Criminal Law Act 1609	The several acts made in the seventh year of the reign of our said sovereign lord King James after mentioned; the one intituled, An act for the better execution of justice, and suppressing of criminal offenders in the north parts of the kingdom of England.	The whole act.
7 Jac. 1. c. 4	Vagabonds Act 1609	The several acts made in the seventh year of the reign of our said sovereign lord King James after mentioned; another intituled, An act for the due execution of divers laws and statutes heretofore made against rogues, vagabonds and sturdy beggars, and other lewd and idle persons.	The whole act.
7 Jac. 1. c. 5	Public Officers Protection Act 1609	The several acts made in the seventh year of the reign of our said sovereign lord King James after mentioned; another, intituled, An act for ease in pleading, against troublesome and contentious suits prosecuted against justices of the peace, mayors, constables and certain other his Majesty's officers, for the lawful execution of their office.	The whole act.
7 Jac. 1. c. 11	Game Act 1609	The several acts made in the seventh year of the reign of our said sovereign lord King James after mentioned; another, intituled, An act to prevent the spoil of corn and grain by untimely hawking, and for the better preservation of pheasants and partridges.	The whole act.
7 Jac. 1. c. 12	Shop-books Evidence Act 1609	The several acts made in the seventh year of the reign of our said sovereign lord King James after mentioned; another, intituled, An act to avoid the double payment of debts.	The whole act.
7 Jac. 1. c. 13	Deer Stealing Act 1609	The several acts made in the seventh year of the reign of our said sovereign lord King James after mentioned; another, intituled, An act for the continuation of one statute made in the third year of the reign of our now sovereign lord King James, intituled, An act against unlawful hunting and stealing of deer and conies.	The whole act.
7 Jac. 1. c.	Burning of Moor Act 1609	The several acts made in the seventh year of the reign of our said sovereign lord King James after mentioned; another, intituled, An act against burning of ling, heath and other moor-burning in the counties of York, Durham, Northumberland, Cumberland, Westmorland, Lancaster, Derby, Nottingham and Leicester, at unseasonable times in the year.	The whole act.
7 Jac. 1. c.	Sea Sand (Devon and Cornwall) Act 1609	The several acts made in the seventh year of the reign of our said sovereign lord King James after mentioned; another, intituled, An act for the taking, landing and carrying of sea-sand, for the bettering of grounds, and for the increase of corn and tillage within the counties of Devon and Cornwall.	The whole act.
7 Jac. 1. c.	Inundations, Norfolk and Suffolk Act 1609	The several acts made in the seventh year of the reign of our said sovereign lord King James after mentioned; another, intituled, An act for the speedy recovery of many thousand acres of marsh ground within the counties of Norfolk and Suffolk, lately surrounded by the rage of the sea, in divers parts of the said counties, and for the prevention of the danger of the like surrounding hereafter.	The whole act.

Section 6 of the act revived all previous statutes that eliminated sanctuary protections for offences, restoring their full force and power despite any words of repeal contained in the statute passed in the first session of Parliament during the King's reign or in the present act.

Section 7 of the act completely abolished all sanctuaries and sanctuary privileges, prohibiting their admission or allowance in any case hereafter.

Section 8 of the act made the Perjury Act 1562 (5 Eliz. 1. c. 9) perpetual again, which was made perpetual by section 1 of the Continuance, etc. of Laws Act 1586 (29 Eliz. 1. c. 5) but revived and continued until the end of the next parliamentary session by section 5 of the Continuance, etc. of Laws Act 1603 (1 Jac. 1. c. 5).

Section 9 of the act revived and continued the Wild-fowl Act 1533 (25 Hen. 8. c. 11), which was repealed by the Wild Fowl Act 1549 (3 & 4 Edw. 6), until the end of the next parliamentary session.

Section 10 of the act revived and continued the Sherborne Causeway Act 1554 (1 M. Sess. 3. c. 5) until the end of the next parliamentary session.

=== Repealed enactments ===
Section 11 of the act repealed 70 enactments, listed in that section.

Citation	Short title	Description	Extent of repeal
4 Edw. 3. c. 8	Passages at the ports	One statute made in the fourth year of the reign of the late King Edward the Third, reciting, That before that time a horseman was wont to have his passage over the sea from the port of Dover for two shillings, and a footman for sixpence, and ordering concerning passage at Dover and other places, as in the said statute is contained.	The whole act. (Note: This act was repealed again by the Statute Law Revision Act 1863 (26 & 27 Vict. c. 125). The note to that act says "Repealed by 21 Jac. 1. c. 28. s. 11., but the terms of repeal do not distinctly cover so much as relates to them "that will pass between Ireland"; that part, however, is unnecessary.")
13 Ric. 2. Stat. 1. c. 20	Going beyond sea	One other statute made in the thirteenth year of the reign of the late King Richard the Second, by which it is enacted, That all pilgrims, and all other people, except certain persons in that statute, excepted, shall pass at the ports of Dover and Plymouth, and not elsewhere, without special licence of the King himself.	The whole act.
4 Edw. 4. c. 10	Passage at Dover Act 1464	One statute made in the fourth year of the reign of the late King Edward the Fourth, concerning passage from Dover, and all other statutes therein recited or mentioned.	The whole act.
9 Edw. 3. c. 8	Pilgrims shall pass at Dover only.	One statute made in the fourth year of the reign of the late King Edward the Fourth, concerning passage from Dover, and all other statutes therein recited or mentioned.	The whole act.
37 Edw. 3. c. 3	The several prices of a hen, capon, pullet, and goose.	One other statute made in the seven and thirtieth year of the reign of the late King Edward the Third, concerning the prices of poultry.	The whole act. (Note: This act was already repealed by the Horsebread Act 1623 (21 Jas. 1. c. 21), passed at the same time.)
34 Edw. 3. c. 6	Measures	One statute made in the four and thirtieth year of the reign of the late King Edward the Third, concerning weights and measures and beginning, where it is contained in the great charter, that one measure shall be used through the realm, and by which it is ordained, That certain articles shall be holden and kept, upon the pains contained in a statute made in the eight and twentieth year of the reign of the late King Edward the Third	The whole act.
34 Edw. 3. c. 20	Exportation of Corn Act 1361	One other statute made in the said four and thirtieth year of the reign of the said late King Edward the Third, by which it is ordained, That the justice of corn shall be defended in all the ports of England, so that none have licence or warrant to pass with such corn in any wise, unless it be to certain places in the said act specified.	The whole act.
17 Ric. 2. c. 7	Exportation of corn	One statute made in the seventeenth year of the reign of the late King Richard the Second, whereby licence is granted to all the King's liege people to slip and carry corn out of the realm.	The whole act.
3 Edw. 4. c. 2	Importation Act 1463	One statute made in the third year of the reign of the late King Edward the Fourth, concerning corn not to be brought into the realm in certain cases.	The whole act.
4 Hen. 7. c. 9	Hats and Caps Act 1488	One statute made in the fourth year of the reign of the late King Henry the Seventh, concerning the prices of hats and caps.	The whole act.
14 Ric. 2. c. 7	Customs	One other statute made in the fourteenth year of the reign of the late King Richard the Second, ordering that the passage of tin out of the realm shall be at the port of Dartmouth, and no where else.	The whole act. (Note: This act was already repealed by 15 Ric. 2. c. 8.)
15 Ric. 2. c. 8	Exportation	One other statute made in the fifteenth year of the reign of the late King Richard the Second, concerning carriage of tin to Calais.	The whole act.
4 Hen. 5. c. 3	Pattens Act 1416	One statute made in the fourth year of the reign of the late King Henry the Fifth, concerning making of pattens of asp.	The whole act. (Note: This act was already repealed by the Continuance, etc. of Laws Act 1603 (1 Jas. 1. c. 25).)
36 Edw. 3. c. 8	Wages of priests	One statute made in the six and thirtieth year of the reign of the late King Edward the Third, concerning stipend and wages of priests and priests passing from one diocese to another.	The whole act.
2 Hen. 5. Stat. 2. c. 7	Chaplains	One other statute made in the second year of the reign of the late King Henry the Fifth, concerning wages or stipend of chaplains and priests.	The whole act.
4 Hen. 7. c. 8	Woollen Cloth Act 1488	One act made in the fourth year of the reign of King Henry the Seventh, as appointed the rates and prices how broad cloths of the colour white, or other colours, and other cloths shall be sold.	The whole act.
11 Hen. 7. c. 2	Vagabonds and Beggars Act 1495	One statute made in the eleventh year of the reign of the late King Henry the Seventh, concerning vagabonds, unlawful games and alehouses, and every part thereof, together with one statute made in the time of the late King Richard the Second therein mentioned.	The whole act.
19 Hen. 7. c. 12	Vagabonds Act 1503	One statute made in the nineteenth year of the reign of the late King Henry the Seventh, concerning vagabonds, beggars, unlawful games and alehouses, and every part thereof.	The whole act.
23 Edw. 3. c. 7	Ordinance of Labourers 1349	One statute made in the three and twentieth year of the reign of the late King Edward the Third, concerning valiant beggars.	The whole act.
7 Ric. 2. c. 5	Vagabonds Act 1383	One other statute made in the seventh year of the reign of the late King Richard the Second, concerning roberts-men, drawlatches, vagabonds and faitors.	The whole act. (Note: This act was also repealed earlier in this section "One statute made in the eleventh year of the reign of the late King Henry the Seventh, concerning vagabonds, unlawful games and alehouses, and every part thereof, together with one statute made in the time of the late King Richard the Second therein mentioned.")
12 Ric. 2. c. 3	No servant shall depart from one hunted to another, without a testimonial under the King's seal, on pain of being set in the stocks.	Seven several acts and statutes made in the twelfth year of the reign of the late King Richard the Second, whereof the first concerneth artificers, labourers, servants and victuallers.	The whole act.
12 Ric. 2. c. 4	The several penalties for giving or taking more wages than is limited statute.	Seven several acts and statutes made in the twelfth year of the reign of the late King Richard the Second, whereof the second concerneth wages of servants.	The whole act.
12 Ric. 2. c. 5	Whosoever serveth in husbandry until twelve years old, shall so continue.	Seven several acts and statutes made in the twelfth year of the reign of the late King Richard the Second, whereof the third concerneth labouring at plough and cart.	The whole act.
12 Ric. 2. c. 6	No servants in husbandry, or labourer, shall wear any sword, buckler, or dagger. Unlawful games prohibited.	Seven several acts and statutes made in the twelfth year of the reign of the late King Richard the Second, whereof the fourth concerneth servants bearing of buckler, sword and dagger, and using unlawful games.	The whole act.
12 Ric. 2. c. 7	The punishment of beggars able to serve, and a provision for impotent beggars.	Seven several acts and statutes made in the twelfth year of the reign of the late King Richard the Second, whereof the fifth concerning persons that go a begging.	The whole act.
12 Ric. 2. c. 8	Travellers reporting they have been imprisoned beyond sea shall produce testimonials.	Seven several acts and statutes made in the twelfth year of the reign of the late King Richard the Second, whereof the sixth concerning those that feign themselves men travelling out of the realm, and those to be imprisoned	The whole act.
12 Ric. 2. c. 9	The statute of labourers shall be executed within cities and boroughs.	Seven several acts and statutes made in the twelfth year of the reign of the late King Richard the Second, whereof the seventh, concerneth the execution of the ordinances aforesaid concerning servants, labourers, beggars and vagabonds.	The whole act.
22 Hen. 8. c. 12	Vagabonds Act 1530	One act or statute made in the two and twentieth year of the reign of the late King Henry the Eighth, intituled, An act how aged, poor and impotent persons, compelled to live by alms, shall be ordered, and how vagabonds and mighty strong beggars shall be punished, and every part thereof.	The whole act.
3 & 4 Edw. 6. c. 16	Vagabonds Act 1549	One act or statute made in the third year of the reign of the late King Edward the Sixth, intituled, An act touching the punishment of vagabonds, and other idle persons.	The whole act.
11 Hen. 6. c. 12	Wax Chandlers	One statute made in the eleventh year of the reign of the late King Henry the Sixth, concerning wax-chandlers, the price of candles, and other things wrought of wax.	The whole act.
Statutes of uncertain date	Statutum de Pistoribus, etc.	That part of one statute, commonly called Statutum de pistoribus, c. 5.	which ordaineth, That the assize of wine shall be kept according to the assize of our sovereign lord the King; that is to wit, a sextain at twelvepence; and that if the taverners exceed the same assize, their doors shall be shut up by the mayors and bailiffs, and shall not be suffered to sell wine until they have obtained licence of the King.
24 Hen. 8. c. 6	Sale of Wines Act 1532	by which it is ordained, That no person or persons shall sell any Gascoigne, Guyen or French wines, above certain prices in that act mentioned, under the pain in the said act specified; and that no Malmesies, Romneyes, Sacks, or other sweet wines, shall be sold by retail above the prices therein contained, under the pains in that act mentioned	The whole act.
28 Hen. 8. c. 14	Wines Act 1536	One statute made in the eight and twentieth year of the reign of the late King Henry the Eighth.	By which it is ordained, That no person or persons shall sell any Gascoigne, Guyen or French wines, above certain prices in that act mentioned, under the pain in the said act specified; and that no Malmesies, Romneyes, Sacks, or other sweet wines, shall be sold by retail above the prices therein contained, under the pains in that act mentioned.
25 Hen. 8. c. 18	Cloths Act 1533	That part of a statute made in the five and twentieth year of the reign of the late King Henry the Eighth.	By which it is enacted, That the lords and owners of the messuages, tenements or cottages in the city of Worcester and other towns and boroughs in the said act mentioned, should at no time after that admit, let or set any messuage, tenement or cottage sufficiently repaired within the said city, borough or towns in that act limited, to any person or persons that after that should inhabit in the said city, borough or towns, and exercising the mysteries or craft in that act mentioned, at any higher rent, imposition or charge, than was given for the same at any time within twenty years next before the making of that act.
4 Hen. 7. c. 19	Tillage Act 1488	One act made in the fourth year of King Henry the Seventh, concerning houses of husbandry and tillage.	The whole act.
7 Hen. 8. c. 1 (Note: Incorrectly cited as "7 Hen. 8. c. 11".)	Tillage Act 1515	One act made in the seventh year of King Henry the Eighth, intituled, An act to avoid letting down of towns.	The whole act.
27 Hen. 8. c. 22	Tillage Act 1535	One act made in the seventh and twentieth year of King Henry the Eighth, intituled, An act concerning decay of houses and inclosures.	The whole act.
5 & 6 Edw. 6. c. 5	Tillage Act 1551	One act made in the fifth year of the reign of King Edward the Sixth, intituled, An act for the maintenance of tillage, and increase of corn.	The whole act.
5 Eliz. 1. c. 2	Tillage Act 1562	One act made in the fifth year of the reign of Queen Elizabeth, intituled, An act for maintenance and increase of tillage.	The whole act.
27 Hen. 8. c.	Suppression of Religious Houses Act 1535	The statute made in the seven and twentieth year of the reign of the late King Henry the Eighth.	By which it was ordained, That all and singular persons, bodies politick and corporate, to whom the King's majesty after that should give, grant, let, let or demise any site or precinct, with the houses thereupon builded, together with the demesnes of any monastery, priory or other religious houses, that should be dissolved or given to the King by that act, should be bound to keep honest and sufficient, and occupy sufficient in ploughing and tilling of husbandry, as in that act is specified, under the pains therein contained.
14 Ric. 2. c. 4	Trading	One statute made in the fourteenth year of the reign of the late King Richard the Second, against buying of wool of others than of the owner of the sheep and tithe, and every clause in the same statute.	The whole act.
8 Hen. 6. c. 5	Weights, etc. Act 1429	One statute made in the eighth year of the reign of the late King Henry the Sixth.	By which it is enacted, That no person may buy yarn of woollen yarn, unless he will make cloth thereof.
5 & 6 Edw. 6. c. 7	Wool Act 1551	One statute made in the fifth and sixth year of the reign of the late King Edward the Sixth, intituled, An act limiting the times of buying and selling of wools.	The whole act.
33 Hen. 8. c. 5	Horses Act 1541	One statute made in the three and thirtieth year of the reign of the late King Henry the Eighth, intituled, An act concerning keeping of great horses.	The whole act.
13 Edw. 1. Stat. 2. c. 6	Fairs and markets in churchyards	The statute made in the reign of King Edward the First, commonly called the statute of Winchester.	As concerneth the having, repairing, and view of harness and arms.
28 Edw. 1. Stat. 3. c. 20	Vessels of Gold, Assaying, etc., of Act 1300	The statute commonly called articuli super chartas.	By which it is ordained, That none shall make rings, crosses or locks.
37 Edw. 3. c. 7	Goldsmiths work shall be of good sterling, and marked with his own mark. None shall make white vessel and also gild.	One statute made in the seven and thirtieth year of the reign of the late King Edward the Third.	By which it is ordained, That makers of white vessels shall not gild.
2 Hen. 5. Stat. 2. c. 4	Gilding of Silver Act 1414	One statute made in the second year of the reign of the late King Henry the Fifth.	By which goldsmiths are prohibited to take more than forty-six shillings and eight-pence for a pound Troy of silver gilt.
2 Hen. 6. c. 14	Price of Silver	One statute made in the second year of the reign of the late King Henry the Sixth, by which it is enacted, That no silver be bought for more than thirty shillings the pound of Troy.	The whole act.
2 Hen. 4. c. 6	Foreign coin	One statute made in second year of the reign of the late King Henry the Fourth, against bringing in coin of Flanders, Scotland, and other foreign coin.	The whole act. (Note: This act was repealed for the United Kingdom by the Repeal of Acts Concerning Importation Act 1822 3 Geo. 4. c. 41.)
2 Hen. 4. c. 12	Welshmen	One statute made in the second year of the reign of the late King Henry the Fourth, by which it is enacted, That no Welshman whole born in Wales, and having father and mother born in Wales, shall purchase landes and tenements within the town of Chester, and other places named in that act; and that no Welshman shall be chosen a citizen or burgess in any city, borough or merchant town; and that Welshmen be not put in certain offices, nor bear arms, and every clause thereof..	The whole act.
2 Hen. 4. c. 16	Wales and Welshmen	One other statute made in the same year concerning arrests made by the inhabitants of Wales, and driving of distresses into Wales.	The whole act.
2 Hen. 4. c. 17	Wales and Welshmen	One other statute made in the same year concerning Welshmen entering into the counties adjoining, and in the same do kill, burn, ravish, and commit any other felony or trespass.	The whole act.
2 Hen. 4. c. 18	Wales and Welshmen	One other statute made in the same year, by which it is enacted, That the lords of the marches of Wales shall ordain and set sufficient stuffing and ward in their castles, and seigniories of Wales.	The whole act.
2 Hen. 4. c. 20	Welshmen	One other statute made in the same year, by which it is established, That no Welshmen be received to purchase lands or tenements within England, nor within the English boroughs or English towns of Wales; nor that no Welshman should be accepted burgess, nor to have any other liberty within the realm, nor within the said boroughs and towns aforesaid; and every clause in every of the said statutes made in the said second year.	The whole act.
4 Hen. 4. c. 26	Penal laws against the Welsh	One statute made in the fourth year of the reign of the King Henry the Fourth.	Whereby it is ordained, That no Englishman, liege to the King, be convicted by any Welshman; nor that English burgesses which have married Welshwomen, have franchises with English burgesses.The whole act. (Note: This act was repealed again by the Statute Law Revision Act 1863 (26 & 27 Vict. c. 125). The note to that act says "Repealed in part by 21 Jac. 1. c. 28. s. 11. The residue may be considered as virtually repealed by the same repeal; and see 6 Geo. 4. c. 50. The whole chapter is treated in Ruffhead's and Raithby's Editions as repealed by 21 Jac. 1. c. 28.")
4 Hen. 4. c. 28	Penal laws against the Welsh	One other statute made in the same year by which it is ordained, That no congregations be made or suffered to be made by the Welshmen, but as in the said statute is appointed.	The whole act.
4 Hen. 4. c. 30	Wales	One other statute made in the same year, concerning sending and bringing merchandize and armour into Wales.	The whole act. (Note: This act was repealed again by the Statute Law Revision Act 1863 (26 & 27 Vict. c. 125). The note to that act says "Intended to be repealed by 21 Jac. 1. c. 28. s. 11., but erroneously described there as a Statute "concerning "sending or bringing Merchandize "and Armour into Wales," instead of "Victual and Armour."")
4 Hen. 4. c. 31	Wales and Welshmen	One other statute made in the same year, concerning Welshmen not having of castle, fortress or house of defence to keep.	The whole act.
4 Hen. 4. c. 32	Wales and Welshmen	One other statute made in the same year, That Welshmen shall not be made justice, chamberlain, nor have certain other offices in the said statute mentioned.	The whole act.
4 Hen. 4. c. 33	Wales and Welshmen	One other statute made in the same year, concerning storing of the castles and towns in Wales with English.	The whole act.
4 Hen. 4. c. 34	Wales and Welshmen	One other statute made in the same year, That Englishmen marrying Welshwomen, shall not be put in offices; and every clause of the said statute made in the said fourth year.	The whole act.
9 Hen. 4. c. 3	Felons in South Wales shall be taken, or the country shall satisfy for their offences.	One statute made in the ninth year of the reign of the said late King Henry the Fourth, concerning felonies and robberies done within any seigniory of South-Wales.	The whole act.
25 Hen. 6. c. 1	Wales	So much of one statute made in the twenty-fifth year of the reign of the late King Henry the Sixth, as concerneth the confirming of statutes made before that time against Welshmen, and making void grants of franchises made to Welshmen, and concerning villains in Wales.	The whole act.
13 Ric. 2. Stat. 1. c. 8	Statute of Victuallers and Hostellers 1389	One statute made in the thirteenth year of the reign of King Richard the Second.	By which it is ordained, That hostlers shall sell hay and oats at a reasonable price, to that they take not but one half-peny over the common price in the market.
4 Hen. 4. c. 25	Hostlers	One other statute made in the fourth year of the reign of King Henry the Fourth.	By which it is enacted That hostlers shall incur the quadruple value of that that he hath taken over one half-peny of every bushel of oats above the common price in the market.
4 & 5 Ph. & M. c. 5	Woollen Cloths Act 1557	The statute made in the fourth and fifth year of the reign of the late King Philip and Queen Mary and other statutes.	By which it is enacted, That none shall put to sale within the realm of England any coloured cloth of any other colour or colours, than are in these acts mentioned.
5 & 6 Edw. 6. c. 6	Woollen Cloth Act 1551	The statute made in the fourth and fifth year of the reign of the late King Philip and Queen Mary and other statutes.	By which it is enacted, That none shall put to sale within the realm of England any coloured cloth of any other colour or colours, than are in these acts mentioned.
4 & 5 Ph. & M. c. 5	Woollen Cloths Act 1557	The same statute of Philip and Mary.	By which it is ordained, That after the first day of May then next coming, none shall use or exercise the feat or mystery of making, weaving or rowing of woolen clothes long or short, of kerties, pinned whites or plain straits, to the intent to put the same to sale, but only in a market-town where cloth had afore been made by the space of ten years then last past, or in a city, borough or town corporate, upon the pains therein contained.
18 Eliz. 1. c. 16	Clothiers Act 1575	One statute made in the eighteenth year of the reign of the late Queen Elizabeth, for toleration of certain clothiers to dwell out of towns corporate.	The whole act.

Section 12 of the act provided that so much of the Horses Act 1540 (32 Hen. 8. c. 13) "as concerneth or inhibeteth the putting of horses into certain grounds, unless they be of statures in that act mentioned, under the pains therein contained, and that giveth authority to kill mares, fillies, foals or geldings, in certain cases in that act mentioned" would not extend to Cornwall until the end of the next parliamentary session.

== Subsequent developments ==
The whole act was repealed by section 1 of, and the schedule to, the Statute Law Revision Act 1863 (26 & 27 Vict. c. 125), which came into force on 28 July 1863.

The qualified terms of the repeal led to several acts being repealed by later Statute Law Revision Acts, including:

- Statute Law Revision Act 1863 (6 & 27 Vict. c. 125)

The limited territorial extent of the act to England and Wales meant that several acts were later repealed by the Statute Law Revision (Ireland) Act 1872 (35 & 36 Vict. c. 98), which repealed for Ireland statutes from the Magna Carta until 1495 that were extended to Ireland by the passage of Poynings' Law 1495 (10 Hen. 7. c. 22 (I)).
