= Penal law (disambiguation) =

Penal law refers to criminal law.

It may also refer to:

- Penal law (British), laws to uphold the establishment of the Church of England against Catholicism
- Penal laws (Ireland), discriminatory laws against Irish Catholics to force them to accept the anglican Church of Ireland from 1695-1829
- Penal laws against the Welsh 1401–2, discriminatory laws against the Welsh people to coerce obedience to English rule
