= Horsebread =

Type of medieval bread

- Type: Bread
- Place of origin: Medieval Europe
- Main ingredients: Legumes, grains, nuts, roots

Statute of Victuallers and Hostellers 1389
- Act of Parliament
- Parliament of England
- Long title: The rates of labourers wages shall be assessed and proclaimed by the justices of peace, and they shall assess the gains of victuallers. Who shall make horsebread, and the weight and price thereof.
- Citation: 13 Ric. 2. Stat. 1. c. 8
- Territorial extent: England and Wales; Ireland

Dates
- Royal assent: 1389
- Commencement: 17 January 1390 (Note: Start of session.)
- Repealed: 4 July 1844

Other legislation
- Amended by: 4 Hen. 4. c. 24; Horsebread Act 1623; Continuance, etc. of Laws Act 1623
- Repealed by: Forestalling, Regrating, etc. Act 1844
- Relates to: Labourers Act 1425

Status: Repealed

Text of statute as originally enacted

Horsebread Act 1540
- Act of Parliament
- Parliament of England
- Long title: An Act concerning baking of Horse-bread.
- Citation: 32 Hen. 8. c. 41
- Territorial extent: England and Wales

Dates
- Royal assent: 24 July 1540
- Commencement: 12 April 1540
- Repealed: 29 May 1624

Other legislation
- Repealed by: Horsebread Act 1623
- Relates to: Statute of Victuallers and Hostellers 1389; 4 Hen. 4. c. 25

Status: Repealed

Text of statute as originally enacted

Horsebread Act 1623
- Act of Parliament
- Parliament of England
- Long title: An Act concerning Hostlers and Inn-holders.
- Citation: 21 Jas. 1. c. 21
- Territorial extent: England and Wales

Dates
- Royal assent: 29 May 1624
- Commencement: 12 February 1624
- Repealed: 21 July 1856

Other legislation
- Amends: Statute of Victuallers and Hostellers 1389; 4 Hen. 4. c. 25
- Repeals/revokes: 37 Edw. 3. c. 3; Horsebread Act 1540
- Repealed by: Repeal of Obsolete Statutes Act 1856

Status: Repealed

Text of statute as originally enacted

Horsebread was a type of bread produced and consumed in medieval Europe. At the time, it was considered to be of low quality, made from a seasonal mix of legumes, such as dry split peas, and bran along with other non-wheat cereal grains such as oats and rye, and acorns. It was one of the cheapest breads available.

As the name suggests, it was primarily used as a feed supplement for horses, being more compact and easier to digest than bulkier feed like hay. Horsebread was given to work horses to help them recover, and special horsebread recipes were developed for race horses as part of their training.

During times of siege or famine, the less-expensive horsebread could sustain the population, and was consumed by the very poor "even in times of plenty". It was associated with poverty, since those who could afford white bread, which was the most labour-intensive, and therefore expensive bread, considered horse bread and other breads like rye or barley breads unfit for their position in society.

The making and selling of horse bread was controlled by law. In 1389 an act of Parliament of England, the Statute of Victuallers and Hostellers (13 Ric. 2. c. 8) specified that hostelers and inn keepers were not permitted to make horse bread for sale, but that it could only be made by certified bakers, and that the weight and price of loaves should be, "Reasonable after the price of Corn in the Market." No punishment was specified for offenders. In 1402, under King Henry IV (4 Hen. 4. c. 25) the fine was set at three times the value of the bread sold.

In 1540 under King Henry VIII, the Horsebread Act 1540 (32 Hen. 8. c. 41) amended these terms so that any hosteller or inn keeper in a town where there had been no baker for seven years was permitted to make horsebread for sale as long as the price was reasonable, "according as the price of the graynes of corn that now is." This was confirmed in 1623 by a further act under King James I, the Horsebread Act 1623 (21 Jas. 1. c. 21) where justices of the peace were given authority to set the fine as they saw fit.

White breads were generally eaten by the middle class and wealthy, because of the labour involved in refining flour. This is in contrast with modern whole-grain breads, which are typically seen as premium-priced health foods or gourmet foods. This is partly because modern flour has a higher gluten content than flour produced in medieval Europe, so bread made from less-refined flour is more palatable than it would have been during the Middle Ages.

== See also ==
- Brown bread – another European bread that was originally considered undesirable
- Polenta – as a staple food of the poor in early modern northern Italy
- Sprouted bread
- Whole wheat bread
