= Exportation of Corn Act 1361 =

Act of Parliament of England

- Act of Parliament
- Parliament of England
- Long title: No corn shall be transported but to Calais and Gascoign.
- Citation: 34 Edw. 3. c. 20
- Territorial extent: England and Wales; Ireland

Dates
- Royal assent: 1361
- Commencement: 1361
- Repealed: England and Wales: 19 February 1624; Northern Ireland: 23 May 1950

Other legislation
- Repealed by: England and Wales: Continuance, etc. of Laws Act 1623; Northern Ireland: Statute Law Revision Act 1950

Status: Repealed

Text of statute as originally enacted

The Exportation of Corn Act 1361 (34 Edw. 3. c. 20) was an act of the Parliament of England passed during the reign of Edward III that prohibited the exportation of corn to any foreign port except Calais and Gascony. If a corn harvest did not yield a lot of food, it was better for the corn to be used to feed the English rather than be exported.

== Subsequent developments ==
The act was extended to Ireland by Poynings' Law 1495 (10 Hen. 7. c. 22 (I)).

The whole act was repealed for England and Wales by section 11 of the Continuance of Laws, etc. Act 1623 (21 Jas. 1. c. 28), which came into force on 19 February 1624.

The whole act was repealed by section 1(1) of, and the first schedule to, the Statute Law Revision Act 1950 (14 Geo. 6. c. 6), which came into force on 23 May 1950.
