= Breed of Horses Act 1535 & Horses Act 1540 =

Act of Parliament of England

Breed of Horses Act 1535
- Act of Parliament
- Parliament of England
- Long title: An Act concerning the Breed of Horses.
- Citation: 27 Hen. 8. c. 6
- Territorial extent: England and Wales

Dates
- Royal assent: 14 April 1536
- Commencement: 1 May 1537 (Note: Section 1.)
- Repealed: 28 July 1863

Other legislation
- Amended by: Horses Act 1540
- Repealed by: Statute Law Revision Act 1863
- Relates to: Horses Act 1566

Status: Repealed

Text of statute as originally enacted

Horses Act 1540
- Act of Parliament
- Parliament of England
- Long title: An Act concerning the Breed of Horses of higher Stature.
- Citation: 32 Hen. 8. c. 13
- Territorial extent: England and Wales

Dates
- Royal assent: 24 July 1540
- Commencement: 1 March 1540
- Repealed: 21 July 1856

Other legislation
- Amends: Breed of Horses Act 1535
- Amended by: Continuance, etc. of Laws Act 1623
- Repealed by: Repeal of Obsolete Statutes Act 1856
- Relates to: Horses Act 1566

Status: Repealed

Text of statute as originally enacted

The Breed of Horses Act 1535 and the Horses Act 1540 were acts of the Parliament of England, which aimed to improve the national stock of horses through breeding.

== The acts ==
The Breed of Horses Act 1535 (27 Hen. 8. c. 6) mentions a marked decay in the quality of the breed, the cause it is claimed that "in most places of this Realme little horsis and naggis of small stature and valeu be suffered to depasture and also to covour marys and felys of very small stature". The statute thus required each owner of enclosed deer-parks to possess a minimum of two mares whose height was to be above thirteen hands high in order for them to be bred with horses of no shorter than fourteen hands high.

Section 12 of the Continuance, etc. of Laws Act 1623 (21 Jas. 1. c. 28) provided that so much of the act "as concerneth or inhibeteth the putting of horses into certain grounds, unless they be of statures in that act mentioned, under the pains therein contained, and that giveth authority to kill mares, fillies, foals or geldings, in certain cases in that act mentioned" would not extend to Cornwall until the end of the next parliamentary session.

The whole act was repealed by section 1 of, and the schedule to, the Statute Law Revision Act 1863 (26 & 27 Vict. c. 125), which came into force on 28 July 1863.

The Horses Act 1540 (32 Hen. 8. c. 13) ordered that no stallion under 15 hands (60 inches, 152 cm) and no mare under 13 hands (52 inches, 132 cm) was permitted to run out on common land, or to run wild, and no two-year-old colt under 11.2 hands (46 inches, 117 cm) was allowed to run out in any area with mares. Annual round-ups of the commons were enforced, and any stallion under the height limit was ordered to be destroyed, along with "all unlikely tits whether mares or foals."

The whole act was repealed by the Repeal of Obsolete Statutes Act 1856 (19 & 20 Vict. c. 64).

== Subsequent developments ==
Horses Act 1566
- Act of Parliament
- Parliament of England
- Long title: An Act for the Repeal of a Brach of a Statute, made 32° Henrici Octavi, for the Stature of Horses within the Isle of Elye, and other Places confining thereunto.
- Citation: 8 Eliz. 1. c. 8
- Territorial extent: England and Wales

Dates
- Royal assent: 2 January 1567
- Commencement: 30 September 1566 (Note: Start of session.)
- Repealed: 21 July 1858

Other legislation
- Repealed by: Repeal of Obsolete Statutes Act 1856
- Relates to: Breed of Horses Act 1535; Horses Act 1540

Status: Repealed

Text of statute as originally enacted

The requirement for swingeing culls of "under-height" horses was partially repealed by a statute of Elizabeth I, the Horses Act 1566 (8 Eliz. 1. c. 8) on the basis that the poor lands could not support the weight of the horses desired by Henry VIII because of "their rottenness ... they are not able to breed beare and bring forth such great breeds of stoned horses as by the statute of 32 Henry VIII is expressed, without peril of miring and perishing of them", and thus many ponies of Britain's mountain and moorland pony breeds in their native environments escaped the slaughter.

The whole act was repealed by section 1 of the Repeal of Obsolete Statutes Act 1856 (19 & 20 Vict. c. 64), which came into force on 21 July 1856.

== Bibliography ==
- Lehmberg, Stanford E. (1970), The Reformation Parliament 1529-1536, Cambridge University Press, ISBN 0-521-07655-2
- Axe, J. Wortley (2008), The Horse - Its Treatment In Health And Disease, Hewlett Press, ISBN 978-1-4437-7540-3
