= Repeal of Obsolete Statutes Act 1856 =

Act of the Parliament of the United Kingdom

- Act of Parliament
- Parliament of the United Kingdom
- Long title: An Act to repeal certain Statutes which are not in use.
- Citation: 19 & 20 Vict. c. 64
- Introduced by: Peter Locke King MP (Commons); Hugh Fortescue, 3rd Earl Fortescue (Lords)
- Territorial extent: United Kingdom

Dates
- Royal assent: 21 July 1856
- Commencement: 21 July 1856 (Note: The Acts of Parliament (Commencement) Act 1793.)
- Repealed: 11 August 1875

Other legislation
- Repeals/revokes: See § Repealed enactments
- Amended by: See § Repealed enactments
- Repealed by: Statute Law Revision Act 1875
- Relates to: See Statute Law Revision Acts

Status: Repealed

History of passage through Parliament

Records of Parliamentary debate relating to the statute from Hansard

Text of statute as originally enacted

The Repeal of Obsolete Statutes Act 1856 (19 & 20 Vict. c. 64), also known as the Statute Law Revision Act 1856, was an act of the Parliament of the United Kingdom that repealed for the United Kingdom enactments from 1285 to 1777 which had ceased to be in force or had become unnecessary.

Halsbury's Laws labelled this act as the first act for statute law revision (in the sense of repealing enactments which are obsolete, spent, unnecessary or superseded, or which no longer serve a useful purpose). Courtenay Ilbert described this act as the first Statute Law Revision Act.

== Background ==
In the United Kingdom, acts of Parliament remain in force until expressly repealed. Blackstone's Commentaries on the Laws of England, published in the late 18th-century, raised questions about the system and structure of the common law and the poor drafting and disorder of the existing statute book.

In 1806, the Commission on Public Records passed a resolution requesting the production of a report on the best mode of reducing the volume of the statute book. From 1810 to 1825, The Statutes of the Realm was published, providing for the first time the authoritative collection of acts. In 1816, both Houses of Parliament, passed resolutions that an eminent lawyer with 20 clerks be commissioned to make a digest of the statutes, which was declared "very expedient to be done." However, this was never done.

At the start of the parliamentary session in 1853, Lord Cranworth announced his intention to the improvement of the statute law and in March 1853, appointed the Board for the Revision of the Statute Law to repeal expired statutes and continue consolidation, with a wider remit that included civil law. The Board issued three reports dated 18 August 1853, 31 January 1854 and 2 June 1854, recommending the creation of a permanent body for statute law reform.

In 1854, Lord Cranworth appointed the Royal Commission for Consolidating the Statute Law to consolidate existing statutes and enactments of English law. The Commission made four reports.

An alternative approach, focusing on expunging obsolete laws from the statute book, followed by consolidation, was proposed by Peter Locke King MP, who was heavily critical of the expenditure of the Commission and the lack of results.

== Subsequent developments ==
The whole act was repealed by section 1 of, and the schedule to, the Statute Law Revision Act 1875 (38 & 39 Vict. c. 66), which came into force on 11 August 1875.

== Repealed enactments ==
Section 1 of the act repealed 120 obsolete acts that had been deemed unnecessary by the Statute Law Commission. In addition to the explicitly listed acts, any act "confirming, continuing, or perpetuating the same" were also repealed.

Citation	Short Title	Description	Extent of repeal
Statute of Westminster the Second 13 Edw. 1. c. 33	Forfeiture of lands	Lands where Crosses be set shall be forfeited as Lands aliened in Mortmain.	The whole act.
Statute of Westminster the Second 13 Edw. 1. c. 41	Alienation by religious houses, etc.	A Contra formam collationis and a Cessarit to recover Lands given in Alms.	The whole act.
Articuli super Chartas 28 Edw. 1. c. 5	Chancery and Queen's Bench	The Chancellor and the Justices of the King's Bench shall follow the King.	The whole act.
Articuli super Chartas 28 Edw. 1. c. 20	Vessels of Gold, Assaying, etc., of Act 1300	Vessels of Gold shall be assayed, touched, and marked; the King's Prerogative shall be saved.	The whole act.
5 Edw. 3. c. 14	Arrest, etc., of Night Walkers, etc. Act 1331	Night Walkers and suspected Persons shall be safely kept.	The whole act.
Statute of Nottingham 10 Edw. 3. Stat. 3	Statute of Nottingham	De cibariis utendis.	The whole act.
25 Edw. 3. Stat. 5. c. 22	Provisors	He that purchaseth a Provision in Rome for an Abbey shall be out of the King's Protection, and any Man may do with him as with the King's Enemy.	The whole act.
28 Edw. 3. c. 10	Misprisions in cities and boroughs	The Penalty of the Mayor, Sheriffs, &c. of London, if they do not redress Errors and Misprisions there; and in what Counties the Trial thereof shall be.	The whole act.
37 Edw. 3. c. 15	Clothiers	Clothiers shall make Cloths sufficient of the aforesaid Prices, so that this Statute for Default of such Cloths be in nowise infringed.	The whole act. (Note: This act was already repealed by the Forestalling, Regrating, etc. Act 1844 (7 & 8 Vict. c. 24).)
6 Ric. 2. Stat. 1. c. 9	Victuallers	No Victualler shall execute a judicial Place in a City or Town Corporate.	The whole act.
7 Ric. 2. c. 13	Riding armed	No Man shall ride in Harness within the Realm, nor with Launcegays.	The whole act.
12 Ric. 2. c. 12	Expenses of knights of shires	In what Cases the Lords and Spiritual Persons shall be contributory to the Expenses of the Knights of Parliament.	The whole act.
12 Ric. 2. c. 13	Nuisances in Towns Act 1388	The Punishment of them which cause Corruption near a City or great Town, to corrupt the Air.	The whole act.
13 Ric. 2. Stat. 1. c. 8	Statute of Victuallers and Hostellers 1389	The Rates of Labourers Wages shall be assessed and proclaimed by the Justices of Peace. and they shall assess the Gains of Victuallers who shall make Horsebread. and the Weight and Price thereof.	The whole act. (Note: This act was already repealed by the Forestalling, Regrating, etc. Act 1844 (7 & 8 Vict. c. 24).)
17 Ric. 2. c. 4	Malt	Malt sold to London shall be cleansed from the Dust.	The whole act.
17 Ric. 2. c. 10	Gaol delivery	Two learned Men in the Law shall be in Commission of Jail Delivery.	The whole act.
20 Ric. 2. c. 1	Riding armed	No Man shall ride or go armed; Launcegays shall be put out.	The whole act.
20 Ric. 2. c. 2	Liveries	Who only may wear another's Livery.	The whole act. (Note: This act was already repealed for England and Wales by the Continuance of Laws, etc. Act 1627 (3 Cha. 1 . c. 5).)
1 Hen. 4. c. 15	London	The Punishment of the Mayor, &c. of London for Defaults committed there.	The whole act.
4 Hen. 4. c. 5	Sheriffs	Every Sheriff shall in Person continue in his Bailiwick and shall not let it.	The whole act.
4 Hen. 4. c. 10	Coinage	The Third Part of the Silver bought to the Bullion shall be coined in Halfpence and Farthings.	The whole act.
4 Hen. 4. c. 25	Hostlers	An Hostler shall not make Horsebread. How much he may take for Oats.	The whole act. (Note: This act was already repealed by the Forestalling, Regrating, etc. Act 1844 (7 & 8 Vict. c. 24).)
4 Hen. 4. c. 27	Penal laws against the Welsh	There shall be no Wasters, Vagabonds, &c. in Wales.	The whole act.
4 Hen. 4. c. 29	Welshmen	Welshmen shall not be armed.	The whole act.
5 Hen. 4. c. 2	Approvers	The Penalty of him which procureth Pardon for an Approver that committeth Felony again.	The whole act.
5 Hen. 4. c. 13	Plating	What Things may be gilded and laid on with Silver and Gold, and what not.	The whole act.
7 Hen. 4. c. 7	Arrowheads	Arrowheads shall be wellboiled, brased, and hard.	The whole act.
11 Hen. 4. c. 1	Elections to Parliament	The Penalty on a Sheriff for making an untrue Return of the Election of the Knights of Parliament.	The whole act.
1 Hen. 5. c. 4	Bailiffs of sheriffs, etc.	Sheriff's Bailiffs shall not be in the same Office in Three Years after; Sheriff's Officers shall not be Attorneys.	The whole act.
2 Hen. 5. Stat. 2. c. 4	Gilding of Silver Act 1414	There shall be no gilding of Silver Ware but of the Allay of English Sterling.	The whole act.
4 Hen. 5 Stat. 2 c. 6	Irish	Penalty on Irish Prelates for collating an Irishman to a Benefice in England or bringing an Irishman to Parliament to discover the Counsels of Englishmen to Rebels.	The whole act.
8 Hen. 5. c. 3	Gold and Silver	What Things only may be gilded and what laid on with Silver.	The whole act.
9 Hen. 5 Stat. 1. c. 10	Coal-keels at Newcastle	Keels that carry Sea Coals to Newcastle shall be measured and marked.	The whole act.
1 Hen. 6. c. 3	Irishmen	What Sort of Irishmen only may come to dwell in England.	The whole act.
6 Hen. 6. c. 4	Parliament Act 1427	The Sheriff's Traverse to an Inquest found touching returning Knights of Shires for the Parliament.	The whole act.
8 Hen. 6. c. 22	Wool	What is requisite to be done in winding and packing of Wool. None shall force, clack, or beard any Wool.	The whole act.
11 Hen. 6. c. 1	Stews in Southwark Act 1433	They that dwell at the Stews in Southwark shall not be impanelled in Juries nor keep any Inn or Tavern but there.	The whole act.
18 Hen. 6. c. 18	Soldiers Act 1439	How much a Captain shall forfeit that doth detain any Part of his Soldier's Wages.	The whole act.
23 Hen. 6. c. 4	Welshmen	Welshmen indicted of Treason or Felony that do repair unto Herefordshire shall be apprehended and imprisoned or else pursued by Hue and Cry, and a Forfeiture of those which do not pursue them.	The whole act.
28 Hen. 6. c. 5	Customs	The Penalty of the Officers of the Customs which by Colour of their Offices shall distrain any Man's Ships or Goods.	The whole act.
4 Edw. 4. c. 8	Horn Act 1464	No Stranger shall buy English Horns unwrought gathered or growing in London or within Twenty-four Miles thereof. Certain Powers vested in the Wardens of the Horners of London.	The whole act.
17 Edw. 4. c. 4	Tiles Act 1477	An Act for making of Tile.	The whole act.
4 Hen. 7. c. 2	Gold and Silver Act 1488	An Act for Finers of Gold and Silver.	The whole act.
4 Hen. 7. c. 3	Slaughter of Beasts Act 1488	An Act that no Butcher slay any Manner of Beast within the Walls of London.	The whole act.
4 Hen. 7. c. 16	Isle of Wight Act 1488	An Act concerning the Isle of Wight.	The whole act.
11 Hen. 7. c. 19	Upholsterers Act 1495	An Act against Upholsterers.	The whole act.
11 Hen. 7. c. 21	Perjury Act 1495	An Act against Perjury.	The whole act.
11 Hen. 7. c. 27	Fustians Act 1495	An Act against unlawful and deceitful making of Fustians.	The whole act.
19 Hen. 7. c. 6	Pewterers Act 1503	Pewterers walking.	The whole act.
19 Hen. 7. c. 10	Gaols Act 1503	De voluntariis et negligentibus escapiis.	The whole act.
3 Hen. 8. c. 14	Oils Act 1511	An Act for the searching of Oils within the City of London.	The whole act.
4 Hen. 8. c. 7	Pewterers Act 1512	The Act made for Pewterers, and true Weights and Beams.	The whole act.
5 Hen. 8. c. 4	Worsteds Act 1513	An Act for avoiding Deceits in Worsteds.	The whole act.
14 & 15 Hen. 8. c. 2	Aliens Act 1523	The Act concerning the taking of Apprentices by Strangers.	The whole act.
14 & 15 Hen. 8. c. 3	Worsteds (Great Yarmouth) Act 1523	The Act concerning the draping of Worsteds, Sayes and Stamins for the Town of Great Yarmouth.	The whole act.
14 & 15 Hen. 8. c. 12	Coining Act 1523	An Act concerning coining of Money.	The whole act.
21 Hen. 8. c. 12	Manufacture of Cables, etc. Act 1529	An Act for true making of great Cables, Halsers, Ropes, and all other Tackling for Ships, &c., in the Borough of Burport in the County of Dorset.	The whole act.
21 Hen. 8. c. 16	Aliens Act 1529	An Act ratifying a Decree made in the Star Chamber concerning Strangers Handicraftsmen inhabiting the Realm of England.	The whole act.
22 Hen. 8. c. 10	Egyptians Act 1530	An Act concerning Egyptians.	The whole act.
24 Hen. 8. c. 10	Destruction of Crows, etc. Act 1532	An Act made and ordained to destroy Choughs, Crows, and Rooks.	The whole act.
25 Hen. 8. c. 5	Worsteds Act 1533	An Act for calendering of Worsteds.	The whole act.
25 Hen. 8. c. 9	Pewterers Act 1533	An Act concerning Pewterers.	The whole act.
25 Hen. 8. c. 13	Tillage Act 1533	An Act concerning Farms and Sheep.	The whole act.
25 Hen. 8. c. 18	Cloths Act 1533	An Act for Clothiers within the Shire of Worcester. (Note: This act was already repealed with savings by the Woollen Manufacture Act 1809 (49 Geo. 3. c. 109).)	The whole act.
26 Hen. 8. c. 5	Ferries on the Severn Act 1534	An Act that Keepers of Ferries on the Water of Severn shall not convey in their Ferry Boats any manner of Person, Goods, or Chattels after the Sun going down till the Sun be up.	The whole act.
26 Hen. 8. c. 6	Marches in Wales Act 1534	An Act that Murders and Felonies done or committed within any Lordship Marcher in Wales shall be inquired of at the Sessions holden within the Shire Grounds next adjoining, with many good Orders for Administration of Justice there to be had.	The whole act.
26 Hen. 8. c. 16	Worsteds (Norwich, Lynn, and Yarmouth) Act 1534	An Act for the making of Worsteds in the City of Norwich and in the Towns of Lynn and Yarmouth.	The whole act.
32 Hen. 8. c. 13	Lordships of Wales Act 1541	For Breed of Horses.	The whole act.
33 Hen. 8. c. 16	Worsted Yarn Act 1541	An Act for Worsted Yarn in Norfolk.	The whole act.
34 & 35 Hen. 8. c. 10	Coverlets Act 1542	An Act for the true making of Coverlets in York.	The whole act.
35 Hen. 8. c. 11	Parliament Act 1543	An Act for the due Payment of the Fees and Wages of Knights and Burgesses for the Parliament in Wales.	The whole act.
1 Edw. 6. c. 6	Worsted Yarn Act 1547	An Act for the Continuance of making of Worsted Yarn in Norfolk.	The whole act.
2 & 3 Edw. 6. c. 9	Leather Act 1548	An Act for the true currying of Leather.	The whole act.
2 & 3 Edw. 6. c. 11	Leather (No. 2) Act 1548	An Act for the true tanning of Leather.	The whole act.
2 & 3 Edw. 6. c. 19	Abstinence from Flesh Act 1548	An Act for Abstinence from Flesh.	The whole act.
2 & 3 Edw. 6. c. 27	Gads of Steel Act 1548	An Act against the false forging of Gadds of Steel.	The whole act.
3 & 4 Edw. 6. c. 2	Woollen Cloths Act 1549	An Act for the true making of Woollen Cloths.	The whole act. (Note: This act was already repealed with savings by the Woollen Manufacture Act 1809 (49 Geo. 3. c. 109).)
3 & 4 Edw. 6. c. 9	Buying of Hides Act 1549	An Act for the buying of raw Hides and Calf Skins.	The whole act.
5 & 6 Edw. 6. c. 6	Woollen Cloth Act 1551	An Act for the making of Woollen Cloth.	The whole act. (Note: This act was already repealed with savings by the Woollen Manufacture Act 1809 (49 Geo. 3. c. 109).)
5 & 6 Edw. 6. c. 24	Making of Hats, etc. Act 1551	An Act for the making of Hats, Dornecks, and Coverlets at Norwich and in the County of Norfolk.	The whole act.
7 Edw. 6. c. 5	Wines Act 1553	An Act to avoid the great Price and Excess of Wines.	The whole act.
7 Edw. 6. c. 7	Assize of Fuel Act 1553	An Act for the Assize of Fuel.	The whole act.
1 Mar. Sess. 3. c. 8	Leather Act 1554	An Act touching the buying and currying of Leather.	The whole act.
1 & 2 Ph. & M. c. 4	Egyptians Act 1554	An Act for the Punishment of certain Persons calling themselves Egyptians.	The whole act.
1 & 2 Ph. & M. c. 7	Towns Corporate Act 1554	An Act that Persons dwelling in the Country shall not sell divers Wares in Cities or Towns Corporate by Retail.	The whole act.
1 Eliz. 1. c. 8	Leather Act 1558	An Act touching Shoemakers and Curriers.	The whole act.
1 Eliz. 1. c. 9	Leather (No. 2) Act 1558	An Act touching Tanners and the selling of tanned Leather.	The whole act.
1 Eliz. 1. c. 15	Timber Act 1558	An Act that Timber shall not be felled to make Coals for the making of Iron.	The whole act.
5 Eliz. 1. c. 8	Leather Act 1562	An Act touching Tanners, Curriers, Shoemakers, and other Artificers occupying the cutting of Leather.	The whole act.
8 Eliz. 1. c. 8	Horses Act 1566	An Act for the Repeal of a Branch of a Statute made Anno 32 H. 8., for the Stature of Horses within the Isle of Ely, and other Places confining thereunto.	The whole act.
8 Eliz. 1. c. 9	Prices of Barrels, etc. Act 1566	An Act to repeal a Branch of the Statute made Anno 23 H. 8. touching the Prices of Barrels and Kilderkins.	The whole act.
8 Eliz. 1. c. 10	Bows Act 1566	An Act for Bowyers and the Prices of Bows.	The whole act.
8 Eliz. 1. c. 12	Cloths (Lancashire) Act 1566	An Act for the Aulneger's Fees in Lancashire and for Length Breadth and Weight of Cottons Frizes and Rugs.	The whole act.
23 Eliz. 1. c. 5	Preservation of Wood Act 1580	An Act touching Iron Mills near unto the City of London and the River of Thames.	The whole act.
23 Eliz. 1. c. 8	Wax Act 1580	An Act for the true melting, making, and working of Wax.	The whole act.
27 Eliz. 1. c. 19	Preservation of Timber Act 1584	An Act for the Preservation of Timber in the Wealds of the Counties of Sussex, Surrey, and Kent, and for the Amendment of Highways decayed by Carriages to and from Iron Mills there.	The whole act.
35 Eliz. 1. c. 9	Cloths Act 1592	An Act touching Breadth of Cloths.	The whole act.
1 Jas. 1. c. 6	Labourers Act 1603	An An Act made for the Explanation of the Statute made in the Fifth Year of the late Queen Elizabeth's Reign concerning Labourers.	The whole act.
1 Jas. 1. c. 20	Painting Act 1603	An Act for Redress of certain Abuses and Deceits used in Painting.	The whole act.
3 Jas. 1. c. 9	Skinners Act 1605	An Act for the Relief of such as lawfully use the Trade and Handicraft of Skinners.	The whole act.
3 Jas. 1. c. 16	Kerseys Act 1605	An Act for the Repeal of One Act made in the Fourteenth Year of Queen Elizabeth's Reign concerning the Length of Kersies.	The whole act.
3 Jas. 1. c. 17	Welsh Cottons Act 1605	An Act concerning Welsh Cottons.	The whole act.
4 Jas. 1. c. 2	Woollen Cloths Act 1606	An Act for the true making of Woollen Cloth.	The whole act. (Note: This act was already repealed with savings by the Woollen Manufacture Act 1809 (49 Geo. 3. c. 109).)
4 Jas. 1. c. 6	Leather Act 1606	An Act for repealing of so much of One Branch of a Statute made in the First Year of His Majesty's Reign, intituled "An Act concerning Tanners Curriers Shoemakers and other Artificers occupying the cutting of Leather," as concerneth the sealing of Sheepskins and to avoid selling of tanned Leather by Weight.	The whole act.
21 Jas. 1. c. 18	Woollen Cloths Act 1623	An Act for Continuance of a Statute made for the making of Woollen Cloths.	The whole act. (Note: This act was already repealed with savings by the Woollen Manufacture Act 1809 (49 Geo. 3. c. 109).)
21 Jas. 1. c. 21	Horsebread Act 1623	An Act concerning Hostlers and Innholder.	The whole act.
12 Cha. 2. c. 32	Exportation Act 1660	An Act for prohibiting the Exportation of Wool, Wool Fells, Fullers Earth, or any Kind of scouring Earth.	The whole act.
14 Cha. 2. c. 18	Wool Act 1662	An Act against exporting of Sheep, Wool, Woolfells, Mortlings, Shorlings, Yarn made of Wool, Wool Flocks, Fullers Earth, Fulling Clay, and Tobacco Pipe Clay.	The whole act.
5 & 6 Will. & Mar. c. 13	Pardon of Felony Act 1694	An Act to repeal the Statute made in the Tenth Year of King Edward the Third for finding Sureties for the good abearing by him or her that hath a Pardon of Felony.	The whole act.
9 Will. 3. c. 40	Exportation Act 1697	An Act for the Explanation and better Execution of former Acts made against Transportation of Wool, Fullers Earth, and Scouring Clay.	The whole act.
10 Will. 3. c .2	Buttons Act 1698	An Act to prevent the making or selling of Buttons made of Cloth, Serge, Drugget, or other Stuffs.	The whole act.
1 Ann. c. 15 (Note: This is the citation in The Statutes of the Realm.) 1 Ann. St. 1. c. 21 (Note: This is the citation in The Statutes at Large.)	Salt Duties, etc. Act 1702	An Act for preventing Frauds in the Duties upon Salt, and for the better Payment of Debentures at the Custom House.	The whole act.
8 Ann. c. 11	Silk Manufacturers Act 1709	An Act for employing the Manufacturers by encouraging the Consumption of Raw Silk and Mohair Yarn.	The whole act.
4 Geo. 1. c. 7	Silk Manufacturers Act 1717	An Act for making more effectual an Act made in the Eighth Year of the late Queen Anne, intituled "An Act for employing the Manufacturers by encouraging the Consumption of Raw Silk and Mohair Yarn."	The whole act.
7 Geo. 1. St. 1. c. 12	Silk Manufacturers Act 1720	An Act for employing the Manufacturers and encouraging the Consumption of Raw Silk and Mohair Yarn by prohibiting the wearing of Buttons and Button-holes made of Cloth, Serge, and other Stuffs.	The whole act.
11 Geo. 2. c. 28	Cloth Manufacture Act 1737	An Act for the better regulating the Manufacture of narrow Woollen Cloths in the West Riding of the County of York.	The whole act.
10 Geo. 3. c. 49	Bricks and Tiles Act 1770	An Act for continuing and amending several Acts for preventing Abuses in making Bricks and Tiles.	The whole act.
17 Geo. 3. c. 42	Bricks and Tiles Act 1776	An Act for preventing Abuses in the making and vending Bricks and Tiles.	The whole act.

== See also ==
- Statute Law Revision Act
