= Benefit of Clergy Act 1402 =

Act of the Parliament of England

- Act of Parliament
- Parliament of England
- Long title: An Act for confirming the Liberties of the Church and Clergy.
- Citation: 4 Hen. 4. c. 3
- Territorial extent: England and Wales; Ireland

Dates
- Royal assent: 25 November 1402
- Commencement: 30 September 1402 (Note: Start of session.)
- Repealed: England and Wales: 28 July 1863; Ireland: 10 August 1872

Other legislation
- Amended by: Statute Law Revision Act 1863
- Repealed by: England and Wales: Statute Law Revision Act 1863; Ireland: Statute Law (Ireland) Revision Act 1872

Status: Repealed

Text of statute as originally enacted

The Benefit of Clergy Act 1402 (4 Hen. 4. c. 3) was an act passed during the reign of Henry IV of England by the Parliament of England that abolished compurgation for high treason and theft..

== Subsequent developments ==
The act was extended to Ireland by Poynings' Law 1495 (10 Hen. 7. c. 22 (I)).

The whole act was repealed for England and Wales by section 1 of, and the schedule to, the Statute Law Revision Act 1863 (26 & 27 Vict. c. 125), which came into force on 28 July 1863.

The whole act was repealed for Ireland by section 1 of, and the schedule to, the Statute Law (Ireland) Revision Act 1872 (35 & 36 Vict. c. 98), which came into force on 10 August 1872.

== See also ==
- Benefit of clergy
- High treason in the United Kingdom
