= List of acts of the Parliament of England from 1606 =

This is a list of acts of the Parliament of England for the year 1606.

For acts passed during the period 1707–1800, see the list of acts of the Parliament of Great Britain. See also the list of acts of the Parliament of Scotland, and the list of acts of the Parliament of Ireland.

For acts passed from 1801 onwards, see the list of acts of the Parliament of the United Kingdom. For acts of the devolved parliaments and assemblies in the United Kingdom, see the list of acts of the Scottish Parliament, the list of acts of the Northern Ireland Assembly, and the list of acts and measures of Senedd Cymru; see also the list of acts of the Parliament of Northern Ireland.

For medieval statutes, etc. that are not considered to be acts of Parliament, see the list of English statutes.

See also the List of ordinances and acts of the Parliament of England, 1642–1660 for ordinances and acts passed by the Long Parliament and other bodies without royal assent, and which were not considered to be valid legislation following the Restoration in 1660.

The number shown after each act's title is its chapter number. Acts are cited using this number, preceded by the years of the reign during which the relevant parliamentary session was held; thus the Union with Ireland Act 1800 is cited as "39 & 40 Geo. 3. c. 67", meaning the 67th act passed during the session that started in the 39th year of the reign of George III and which finished in the 40th year of that reign. The modern convention is to use Arabic numerals in citations (thus "41 Geo. 3" rather than "41 Geo. III"). Acts of the last session of the Parliament of Great Britain and the first session of the Parliament of the United Kingdom are both cited as "41 Geo. 3".

Acts passed by the Parliament of England did not have a short title; however, some of these acts have subsequently been given a short title by acts of the Parliament of the United Kingdom, such as the Short Titles Act 1896 (59 & 60 Vict. c. 14).

Acts passed by the Parliament of England were deemed to have come into effect on the first day of the session in which they were passed. Because of this, the years given in the list below may in fact be the year before a particular act was passed.

== 4 Jas. 1 ==
The third session of the 1st Parliament of King James I (the 'Blessed Parliament') which met from 18 November 1606 until 4 July 1607.

This session was traditionally cited as 4 Jac. 1, 4 Ja. 1 (Note: Chronological Table of the Statutes), 4 J. 1 or 4 & 5 Jac. 1.

=== Public acts ===
Short title	Citation	Royal assent
Long title
Union of England and Scotland Act 1606 (repealed)	4 Jas. 1. c. 1	4 July 1607
An act for the utter abolition of all memory of hostility, and the dependence thereof, between England and Scotland, and for repressing of occasions of disorders, and disorders in time to come. (Repealed by Statute Law Revision Act 1863 (26 & 27 Vict. c. 125))
Woollen Cloths Act 1606 (repealed)	4 Jas. 1. c. 2	4 July 1607
An Act for the true making of Woollen Cloth. (Repealed by Repeal of Obsolete Statutes Act 1856 (19 & 20 Vict. c. 64))
Costs Act 1606 (repealed)	4 Jas. 1. c. 3	4 July 1607
An Act to give Costs to the Defendant upon a Non-sute of the Playntiff or a Verdict agaynst him. (Repealed by Statute Law Revision and Civil Procedure Act 1883 (46 & 47 Vict. c. 49))
Sale of Beer Act 1606 (repealed)	4 Jas. 1. c. 4	4 July 1607
An Act to restraine the utterance of Beere and Ale to Alehouse Keepers and Typlers not licenced. (Repealed by Alehouse Act 1828 (9 Geo. 4. c. 61))
Drunkenness Act 1606 (repealed)	4 Jas. 1. c. 5	4 July 1607
An Act for repressing the odious and loathsome sinne of Drunkennes. (Repealed by Alehouse Act 1828 (9 Geo. 4. c. 61))
Leather Act 1606 (repealed)	4 Jas. 1. c. 6	4 July 1607
An Act for repealing of so much of One Branch of a Statute made in the First Year of His Majesty's Reign, intituled "An Act concerning Tanners Curriers Shoemakers and other Artificers occupying the cutting of Leather," (Note: Leather Act 1603 (1 Jas. 1. c. 22)) as concerneth the sealing of Sheepskins and to avoid selling of tanned Leather by Weight. (Repealed by Repeal of Obsolete Statutes Act 1856 (19 & 20 Vict. c. 64))
Northleech Grammar School Act 1606	4 Jas. 1. c. 7	4 July 1607
An Act for the founding and incorporating of a free grammar school in the town of Northleech in the county of Gloucester.
Land Drainage (Kent Marshes, Lessness and Fantes) Act 1606 (repealed)	4 Jas. 1. c. 8	4 July 1607
An Act touching the drowned marshes of Lesnes and Fants in the county of Kent. (Repealed by Statute Law Revision Act 1948 (11 & 12 Geo. 6. c. 62))
Foreign Trade Act 1606 (repealed)	4 Jas. 1. c. 9	4 July 1607
An Act to explain a former act made in the last session of this parliament, intituled, "An Act to enable all his Majesty's loving subjects of England and Wales to trade freely into the dominions of Spain, Portugal and France." (Note: Foreign Trade Act 1605 (3 Jas. 1. c. 6)) (Repealed by Statute Law Revision Act 1863 (26 & 27 Vict. c. 125))
Charter of Southampton Act 1606	4 Jas. 1. c. 10	4 July 1607
An act for confirmation of some part of a charter granted by King Henry the Sixth to the mayor, bailiffs and burgesses of the town of Southampton, and for the relief of the said town.
Land Inclosure (Herefordshire) Act 1606	4 Jas. 1. c. 11	4 July 1607
An Act for the better provision of meadow and pasture for necessary maintenance of husbandry and tillage in the manors, lordships and parishs of Marden, alias Mawarden, Bodenham, Wellington, Sutton St. Michael, Sutton St Nicholas, Murton upon Lug, and the parish of Pipe, and every of them, in the county of Hereford.
New River Act 1606	4 Jas. 1. c. 12	4 July 1607
An Act for explanation a statute made the third year of the reign of King James, intituled, "An Act for the bringing in of a fresh stream of running water to the north parts of the city of London." (Note: New River Act 1605 (3 Jas. 1. c. 18))
Land Drainage (Waldersey Ring and Coldham) Act 1606 (repealed)	4 Jas. 1. c. 13	4 July 1607
An Act for the draining of certain fens and low grounds in the isle of Ely, subject to hurt by surrounding, containing about six thousand acres, compelled about with certain banks commonly called and named the ring of Waldersey and Cooldham. (Repealed by Great and Little Waldersley Drainage Act 1828 (9 Geo. 4. c. lxxxix))

=== Private acts ===
Short title	Citation	Royal assent
Long title
Assurance of a life interest in Theobalds House and other manors and lands to the Queen, of the same properties and other manors and lands to the King and of other manors and lands to the Earl of Salisbury.	4 Jas. 1. c. 1 Pr.	4 July 1607
An Act for the assurance of the house of Theobalds, and divers manors and other lands, to the Queen's majesty for term of her life, and of the same house, manors and lands, with other manors and lands, to the King's most excellent Majesty, his heirs and successors, and for the assurance of other manors and lands to the earl of Salisbury and his heirs.
John Good's Estate Act 1606	4 Jas. 1. c. 2 Pr.	4 July 1607
An Act for the enabling of John Goode, esquire, to convey unto his Majesty a small portion of land during a term of years.
Earl of Derby's Estate Act 1606	4 Jas. 1. c. 3 Pr.	4 July 1607
An Act for the establishment and assurance of divers of the possessions and hereditaments of Ferdinande late early of Derby.
Enabling Richard Sackville to surrender the office of Chief Butler to the King despite his minority.	4 Jas. 1. c. 4 Pr.	4 July 1607
An Act whereby Richard Sackvile, esquire, is enabled to make a surrender unto the King's majesty of the offices of chiefe butler of England and Wales, notwithstanding his minority of years.
Assurance of advowson of Cheshunt (Hertfordshire) to the Earl of Salisbury and of Orsett (Essex) to the Bishop of London.	4 Jas. 1. c. 5 Pr.	4 July 1607
An Act for the assuring of the advowson of the vicarage of Chesthunt to Robert earl of Salisbury and his heirs, and of the advowson of the rectory of Orset to Richard bishop of London and his successors.
Ibgrave's Estate Act 1606	4 Jas. 1. c. 6 Pr.	4 July 1607
An Act for confirmation of an agreement betwixt Edward lord Bruce (Note: Edward Bruce, 1st Lord Kinloss.) and Michael Doyly and others, for the lands late of William Ibgrave deceased.
Confirmation of letters patent to Robert Bathurst of the manor and borough of Lechlade (Gloucestershire).	4 Jas. 1. c. 7 Pr.	4 July 1607
An Act for confirmation of the King's majesty's letters patents made to Robert Bathurst, esquire, of the manor and borough of Lachlad in the county of Gloucester.
Confirmation of letters patent to William Bourcher of the manor of Bardisley (Gloucestershire).	4 Jas. 1. c. 8 Pr.	4 July 1607
An Act for the confirmation of the King's majesty's letters patents made to William Bourcher, esquire, of the manor of Bardisley in the county of Gloucester.
Confirmation of lands to All Souls' College, Oxford, and to Sir William Smith.	4 Jas. 1. c. 9 Pr.	4 July 1607
An Act for confirmation of certain lands to the warden and college of the souls of all faithful people deceased of Oxon, and of other lands to sir William Smith, knight.
Confirmation of lands etc. to City of London companies and to the City.	4 Jas. 1. c. 10 Pr.	4 July 1607
An Act for securing and confirming of the lands, tenements and rents heretofore granted, devised or conveyed to several companies within the city of London, and to the mayor and commonalty and citizens of the city of London.
Assurance to purchasers of lands, late the estate of Sir Jonathan Trelawney, directed to be sold for payment of debts.	4 Jas. 1. c. 11 Pr.	4 July 1607
An Act for further assurance to the purchasers of certain lands late sir Jonathon Trelawney's, knight, deceased, appointed by act of parliament to be sold for payment of his debts.
Restitution in blood of Edward Windsor's children.	4 Jas. 1. c. 12 Pr.	4 July 1607
An Act for the restitution in blood of the sons and daughters of Edward Windsor.
John Evelyn's Estate Act 1606	4 Jas. 1. c. 13 Pr.	4 July 1607
An Act for the better enabling John Evelyn, esquire, to make sale of certain lands for the payment of his debts.
Maintenance of John Tompson (the son of a lunatic), and assignment of a jointure for his future wife.	4 Jas. 1. c. 14 Pr.	4 July 1607
An Act for the assignment of a jointure to such wife as John Thompson, son and heir of Robert Thompson a lunatick, shall marry, and for present maintenance of the said John.
William Waller's Estate Act 1606	4 Jas. 1. c. 15 Pr.	4 July 1607
An Act for the sale of lands of William Waller, esquire, to perform a decree in chancery, for the payment of 505l. 10s. 6d.
Naturalization of John Steward Act 1606	4 Jas. 1. c. 16 Pr.	4 July 1607
An Act for the naturalizing of John Steward, esquire, brother and heir apparent to Patricke earl of Orkney.
Naturalization of Peter and Mary Barow or Baro Act 1606	4 Jas. 1. c. 17 Pr.	4 July 1607
An Act for the naturalizing of Peter Baro, alias Barow, doctor of physick, and Mary his wife.
Naturalization of James and Mary Desmaistres Act 1606	4 Jas. 1. c. 18 Pr.	4 July 1607
An Act for the naturalizing of James Desmaistres of the parish of St. Buttolphes without Aldgate, and Mary his wife.
Naturalization of Fabian Smith Act 1606	4 Jas. 1. c. 19 Pr.	4 July 1607
An Act for the naturalizing of Fabian Smith.
Naturalization of John Ramsden Act 1606	4 Jas. 1. c. 20 Pr.	4 July 1607
An Act for the naturalizing of John Ramsden.

=== Sources ===
- Raithby, John, ed. (1963) [1819]. "4° Jac.". Statutes of the Realm. Vol. 4 Part 2: The Statutes of Queen Elizabeth (An. 28-43) and of King James (1586–1623). London: Dawsons. pp. 1132–1152 – via HathiTrust.
- Raithby, John, ed. (1963) [1819]. "4° Jac.". Statutes of the Realm. Vol. 4 Part 2: The Statutes of Queen Elizabeth (An. 28-43) and of King James (1586–1623). London: Dawsons. p. 1132-1152 – via Google Books.
- Raithby, John, ed. (1963) [1819]. "4° Jac.". Statutes of the Realm. Vol. 4 Part 2: The Statutes of Queen Elizabeth (An. 28-43) and of King James (1586–1623). London: Dawsons. p. 1132-1152 – via Internet Archive.
- Pickering, Danby, ed. (1763). "Anno quarto Jacobi". The Statutes at Large. Vol. 7: From the Thirty-ninth Year of Q. Elizabeth to the Twelfth Year of K. Charles. Inclusive. Cambridge: Joseph Bentham. pp. 195–215 – via Internet Archive.
- Journal of the House of Commons. Vol. 1 – 1547-1629. His Majesty's Stationery Office. 1802 – via British History Online.
- Journal of the House of Lords. Vol. 2: 1578-1614. London: His Majesty's Stationery Office. 1830 – via British History Online.
- Chronological Table of and Index to the Statutes. Vol. 1: To the End of the Session 59 Vict. Sess. 2 (1895) (13th ed.). London: Her Majesty's Stationery Office. 1896. pp. 65–66 – via Google Books.
- Chronological Table of the Statutes: Covering the Period from 1235 to the End of 1971. London: Her Majesty's Stationery Office. 1972. p. 63. ISBN 978-0-11-840096-1 – via Google Books.
- "Chronological Tables of the Private and Personal Acts: Part 2 (1603–1640)". legislation.gov.uk. The National Archives.

== See also ==
- List of acts of the Parliament of England
