= Penal laws against the Welsh =

Discriminatory laws against the Welsh people (1401-1624)

- Act of Parliament
- Parliament of England
- Long title: Englishmen shall not be convicted by Welshmen in Wales.
- Citation: 4 Hen. 4. c. 26
- Territorial extent: England and Wales; Ireland; (Note: Although the act was stated to extend to Wales, the act was extended to Ireland by Poynings' Law 1495 (10 Hen. 7. c. 22 (I)) and was repealed for the avoidance of doubt by the Statute Law (Ireland) Revision Act 1872 (35 & 36 Vict. c. 98).)

Dates
- Royal assent: 1402
- Commencement: 30 September 1402 (Note: Start of session.)
- Repealed: England and Wales: 28 July 1863; Ireland: 10 August 1872

Other legislation
- Amended by: Continuance, etc. of Laws Act 1623
- Repealed by: England and Wales: Statute Law Revision Act 1863; Ireland: Statute Law (Ireland) Revision Act 1872
- Relates to: Laws in Wales Act 1535; Laws in Wales Act 1542

Status: Repealed

Text of statute as originally enacted

- Act of Parliament
- Parliament of England
- Long title: There shall be no wasters, vagabonds, &c. in Wales.
- Citation: 4 Hen. 4. c. 27
- Territorial extent: England and Wales; Ireland

Dates
- Royal assent: 1402
- Commencement: 30 September 1402
- Repealed: 21 July 1856

Other legislation
- Repealed by: Repeal of Obsolete Statutes Act 1856
- Relates to: Laws in Wales Act 1535; Laws in Wales Act 1542

Status: Repealed

Text of statute as originally enacted

- Act of Parliament
- Parliament of England
- Long title: There shall be no congregations in Wales.
- Citation: 4 Hen. 4. c. 28
- Territorial extent: England and Wales; Ireland

Dates
- Royal assent: 1402
- Commencement: 30 September 1402
- Repealed: England and Wales: 16 February 1624; Ireland: 10 August 1872

Other legislation
- Repealed by: England and Wales: Continuance, etc. of Laws Act 1623; Ireland: Statute Law (Ireland) Revision Act 1872
- Relates to: Laws in Wales Act 1535; Laws in Wales Act 1542

Status: Repealed

Text of statute as originally enacted

The penal laws against the Welsh (Welsh: Deddfau Penyd) were a set of laws passed by the Parliament of England in 1401 and 1402 that discriminated against the Welsh people as a response to the Glyndŵr rebellion of Owain Glyndŵr, which began in 1400.

Cumulatively, the laws prohibited the Welsh from obtaining senior public office, bearing arms or purchasing property in English boroughs. Public assembly was forbidden, and Englishmen who married Welsh women were also prevented from holding office in Wales.

They were reaffirmed in 1431, 1433 and 1471 although were inconsistently applied in practice. The laws became obsolete with the Laws in Wales Acts 1535 and 1542 under Henry VIII and were finally repealed in 1624.

== History ==
After the Conquest of Wales by Edward I, Wales was divided into the Principality of Wales and various marcher lordships. The 1284 Statute of Rhuddlan, a royal ordinance, established the new arrangement, introducing English common law, but allowing retained Welsh legal practice and custom. In 1294, Madog ap Llywelyn led a revolt against English rule, which was put down in 1295. It was this revolt that led to a second royal ordinance to be issued by Edward I, and this one was, for the first time, clearly discriminatory and general against the Welsh people. In the 1295 ordinance, the Welsh "were not to reside in the English boroughs of Wales, or to bear arms in them, or to conduct trade outside them"

Through the thirteenth century additional prohibitions were added to the 1295 ordinance at various times. These included provisions that "Welshmen should not acquire English land in Wales without licences; that they should not be allowed to live or purchase land in English towns in Wales or the English border counties; that they should be prohibited from holding assemblies; that they should be excluded from all the major posts of civil and military power in Wales; and that English burgesses should only be tried and convicted in Wales by fellow Englishmen."

=== Penal statutes ===
With the 1400 Welsh Revolt of Owain Glyndŵr, parliament enacted a set of penal statutes, beginning in 1401 and considerably extended in 1402. These statutes codified and broadened these existing discriminatory laws and prohibitions.

Six acts were passed in 1401:

- No Welshmen, "wholly born in Wales" could purchase lands or tenements within England nor within the Boroughs or English towns of Wales;
- A Welshman could not obtain the privileges of a citizen or burgess in any city or borough or merchant town; could not become a municipal officer, and was forbidden to carry armour in any city or town;
- Where there was a dispute or debt, the English were permitted to arrest any person and seize their property when coming out of Wales, and hold them until the debt was made good;
- If a Welshman committed a felony in England, and fled to Wales, English officials in Wales were directed to execute him, upon a certificate given by the King's Justice;
- The Lords Marchers were to keep "sufficient stuffing and ward" in their castles in Wales in case of riots; and
- No Englishman could be convicted at the suit of any Welshman in Wales, except by the judgment of English justices, or by the judgment of Englishmen residing there.

Nine additional acts were passed in 1402:

- Englishmen were not to be convicted by Welshmen in Wales;
- "No waster, rhymer, minstrel nor vagabond be in any wise sustained in the land of Wales." - This probably directed against the bards who were engaged by Owain Glyndŵr in rousing insurrection;
- Congregations and councils (i.e. meetings) were forbidden unless they were for an evident and necessary cause, or were held by licence of the chief officials of the Lordships;
- Welshmen were not to carry arms without special licence;
- No food or armour was to be sent into Wales and an English Constable was appointed to prevent and seize such supplies;
- No Welshmen, unless he were a Bishop or Lord, could possess a castle or defend his house;
- No Welshman could hold office in Wales except for bishops;
- All castles and walled towns were to be kept by Englishmen; and
- An Englishman married to any Welshwoman could also not hold office in Wales or its Marches.

=== Implementation ===
These acts were never universally enforced and were introduced as an emergency measure in response to the rebellion. (Note: "It seems very likely that there was never any intention of literally enforcing these measures at all times. They were, essentially, an emergency measure, not to say an act of desperation, designed to allay the hysterical fears aroused in the English by the Rebellion") Nevertheless the immediate effect of these appears to have been the opposite of the intention. Rather than coercing the Welsh to obedience, it may have led many uchelwyr (Welsh nobles) to resort to arms. Meanwhile Welsh labourers, students and nobles were reported to leave England to support the cause.

After the rebellion the statutes often lay dormant as a more peaceful co-existence was rebuilt between English and Welsh in Wales. Nevertheless the existence of the laws meant that they could be appealed to in disputes, to the disadvantage of the Welsh, or indeed to those who married Welsh spouses. Indeed the statutes were reissued in 1431, 1433, 1444 and 1447, at the specific request of English people living in Wales; and it was this perpetual threat of disadvantage that led many of the wealthier or enterprising Welshmen to seek and be granted full English denizenship.

Despite being inconsistently implemented, and widely worked around, the penal laws remained a source of resentment and frustration into the Tudor period. Henry Tudor was born in Pembroke, raised in Raglan and his grandfather hailed from Anglesey. He played up these Welsh connections, even fighting under a banner of a red dragon at the battle of Bosworth Field. On taking the throne, Henry VII broke with convention and also declared himself Prince of Wales, rewarding Welsh supporters thereafter. Through a series of charters the principality and other areas saw the penal laws being abolished, although communities sometimes had to pay considerable sums for these charters. There also remained some doubt about their legal validity.

The penal statutes were finally superseded under Henry VIII by the Laws in Wales Acts 1535 and 1542. These acts were designed to create a uniformity of law across England and Wales and under them, the Welsh became citizens of the realm, and these acts conferred on them the same rights, freedoms and privileges under the laws of the realm as for English subjects. This was welcomed at the time as putting an end to the discriminatory system. Nevertheless, it was not until 1621, when Welsh MP James Perrot of Pembrokeshire moved a Bill which sought to more systematically remove obsolete acts from the statute books, that the penal laws were repealed, being expunged from the statute books in 1624.

== Effects on Welsh people ==
English and Welsh people "were now formally and legally separated from one another, to the disadvantage of the Welsh, in a way which had not been so before, at least legislatively and on a country-wide basis." The principal effect of the penal laws, whether enforced or not, was to reduce the status of the Welsh to that of second-class citizens in their own land. Davies adds that the laws were possibly more effective as psychological propaganda, rather than in practical application. Moreover these laws led to a rise in lawlessness, exacerbated by semi-independent marcher lordships that "became a byword for murders, ambushes, bribery, corruption, piracy and cattle raids.". There was a growing sense of a denial of social opportunity for the Welsh and governance remained disorganised.

Anger remained, but the Glyndŵr Welsh Revolt proved to be the last. Hope of a united independent Wales led by a native Welsh prince gradually ended and the laws penalised the Welsh for their rebellion against the English crown. There would be no future national uprising, and all future rebellions would be based around class rather than national issues. (Note: "Wales was reduced to an annexed land, neither assimilated nor entirely separate to England, a place where the indigenous population were looked down upon and were denied the rights of English subjects. And yet there would not be another major national rising by the Welsh. All future rebellions would be based around class rather than nation and the vast majority of the Welsh came to accept their political reality. Perhaps they still do.")

As well as causing significant ill-feeling among the Welsh people, the laws often restricted nobles in Wales from improving their standing, unable to hold office in their local municipality. Some Welshmen had parliament declare themselves English denizenship so that they were able to achieve higher office or hold land. Although this was not open to all, in everyday life, people were able to overcome racial hierarchy in trade and marriage. Some English nobles intermarried with Welsh women and internalised a Welsh identity, suggesting Wales developed a more complex colonial identity.

== Subsequent developments ==
Although limited in jurisdiction to Wales, the acts were extended to Ireland by Poynings' Law 1495 (10 Hen. 7. c. 22 (I)).

Part of chapter 26 of 4 Hen. 4. was repealed for England and Wales by section 11 of the Continuance, etc. of Laws Act 1623 (21 Jas. 1. c. 28), which came into force on 19 February 1624.

The whole of chapter 27 of 4 Hen. 4. was repealed for England and Wales and Ireland by section 1 of the Repeal of Obsolete Statutes Act 1856 (19 & 20 Vict. c. 64), which came into force on 21 July 1856.

The whole of chapters 26 and 28 of 4 Hen. 4 were repealed for England and Wales by section 1 of, and the schedule to, the Statute Law Revision Act 1863 (26 & 27 Vict. c. 125), which came into force on 28 July 1863.

For the avoidance of doubt, all three chapters were repealed for Ireland by section 1 of, and the schedule to, the Statute Law (Ireland) Revision Act 1872 (35 & 36 Vict. c. 98), which came into force on 10 August 1872.

== See also ==
- English rule in Wales
- Welsh rebellions against English rule
- Penal Laws against Irish Catholics

== Bibliography ==
- Bowen, Ivor, ed. (1908). The statutes of Wales (1908 ed.). London: Unwin.
- Carr, Antony D (2017). The Gentry of North Wales in the later Middle Ages. University of Wales Press. ISBN 978-1-78683-136-1.
- Cross, Claire; Loades, David (2002). Law and Government Under the Tudors: Essays Presented to Sir Geoffrey Elton. Cambridge University Press. ISBN 978-0-521-89363-3.
- Davies, R. R. (1995). The revolt of Owain Glyn Dŵr. Oxford, England: Oxford University Press. ISBN 978-0198205081.
- Gower, Jon (2013). The Story of Wales. BBC Books. ISBN 978-1-84990-373-8.
- Jenkins, Geraint H. (2007). A Concise History of Wales. Cambridge University Press. pp. 118–119. ISBN 978-0-521-82367-8.
- Johnes, Martin (25 August 2019). Wales: England's Colony?. Parthian Books. ISBN 978-1-912681-56-3.
- Johnston, Dafydd (15 April 2014). Llên yr Uchelwyr: Hanes Beirniadol Llenyddiaeth Gymraeg 1300-1525 (in Welsh). University of Wales Press. ISBN 978-1-78316-053-2.
- Marchant, Alicia (2014). The Revolt of Owain Glyndwr in Medieval English Chronicles. Boydell & Brewer Ltd. ISBN 978-1-903153-55-0.
- Rawlins, Jacob D. (28 April 2022). Publishing in Wales: Renaissance and Resistance. Cambridge University Press. ISBN 978-1-108-95267-5.
- Watkin, Thomas Glyn (2007). The Legal History of Wales. Cardiff: University of Wales Press.
- Williams, Glanmor (1993). Renewal and Reformation: Wales C. 1415-1642. Oxford University Press. ISBN 978-0-19-285277-9.
