= List of acts of the Parliament of England, 1399–1411 =

This is a list of acts of the Parliament of England for the years 1399 until 1411.

For acts passed during the period 1707–1800, see the list of acts of the Parliament of Great Britain. See also the list of acts of the Parliament of Scotland and the list of acts of the Parliament of Ireland.

For acts passed from 1801 onwards, see the list of acts of the Parliament of the United Kingdom. For acts of the devolved parliaments and assemblies in the United Kingdom, see the list of acts of the Scottish Parliament, the list of acts of the Northern Ireland Assembly, and the list of acts and measures of Senedd Cymru; see also the list of acts of the Parliament of Northern Ireland.

For medieval statutes, etc. that are not considered to be acts of Parliament, see the list of English statutes.

The number shown after each act's title is its chapter number. Acts are cited using this number, preceded by the year(s) of the reign during which the relevant parliamentary session was held; thus the Union with Ireland Act 1800 is cited as "39 & 40 Geo. 3. c. 67", meaning the 67th act passed during the session that started in the 39th year of the reign of George III and which finished in the 40th year of that reign. Note that the modern convention is to use Arabic numerals in citations (thus "41 Geo. 3" rather than "41 Geo. III"). Acts of the last session of the Parliament of Great Britain and the first session of the Parliament of the United Kingdom are both cited as "41 Geo. 3".

Acts passed by the Parliament of England did not have a short title; however, some of these acts have subsequently been given a short title by acts of the Parliament of the United Kingdom (such as the Short Titles Act 1896).

Acts passed by the Parliament of England were deemed to have come into effect on the first day of the session in which they were passed. Because of this, the years given in the list below may in fact be the year before a particular act was passed.

== 1399 (1 Hen. 4) ==
The 1st Parliament of King Henry IV, which met at Westminster from 6 October 1399 until 19 November 1399.

This session was also traditionally cited as 1 H. 4.

- (Confirmation of liberties, charters and statutes) c. 1 A confirmation of the liberties of the church, and of all statutes not repealed. Justice shall be done, and peace kept. — repealed for England and Wales by Statute Law Revision Act 1863 (26 & 27 Vict. c. 125) and for Ireland by Statute Law (Ireland) Revision Act 1872 (35 & 36 Vict. c. 98)
- (Indemnity) c. 2 None shall be impeached that did assist King Hen. 4. or helped to pursue King Rich. 2. or his adherents. — repealed for England and Wales by Statute Law Revision Act 1863 (26 & 27 Vict. c. 125) and for Ireland by Statute Law (Ireland) Revision Act 1872 (35 & 36 Vict. c. 98)
- (Repeal of 21 Rich. 2) c. 3 A repeal of the whole parliament holden Anno 21 Rich. 2. (Note: 21 Ric. 2) and of the authority given thereby. — repealed for England and Wales by Statute Law Revision Act 1863 (26 & 27 Vict. c. 125) and for Ireland by Statute Law (Ireland) Revision Act 1872 (35 & 36 Vict. c. 98)
- c. 4 A confirmation of the parliament holden 11 Rich. 2. (Note: 11 Ric. 2) — repealed for England and Wales by Statute Law Revision Act 1863 (26 & 27 Vict. c. 125) and for Ireland by Statute Law (Ireland) Revision Act 1872 (35 & 36 Vict. c. 98)
- c. 5 A restitution of those, or their heirs, which were attainted at the parliament bolden 21 Rich. 2. — repealed for England and Wales by Statute Law Revision Act 1863 (26 & 27 Vict. c. 125) and for Ireland by Statute Law (Ireland) Revision Act 1872 (35 & 36 Vict. c. 98)
- (Petitions to the King for Lands) c. 6 In a petition to the King, of lands, offices, &c. the value shall be contained. — repealed by Statute Law Revision Act 1887 (50 & 51 Vict. c. 59)
- (Liveries) c. 7 The penalty for unlawful giving or wearing of liveries. Who wear the King's liveries, and in what places. To what persons only liveries may be given. — repealed for England and Wales by Continuance of Laws, etc. Act 1627 (3 Cha. 1 . c. 5) and for Ireland by Statute Law (Ireland) Revision Act 1872 (35 & 36 Vict. c. 98)
- c. 8 Assise maintainable by the disseisee (Note: A disseisor is a person who has taken adverse possession of land from the real owner.) against the King^s patentee of lands. — repealed for England and Wales by Statute Law Revision Act 1863 (26 & 27 Vict. c. 125) and for Ireland by Statute Law (Ireland) Revision Act 1872 (35 & 36 Vict. c. 98)
- c. 9 A confirmation to the purchasers of lands sold, which were forfeited to the King. — repealed for England and Wales by Statute Law Revision Act 1863 (26 & 27 Vict. c. 125) and for Ireland by Statute Law (Ireland) Revision Act 1872 (35 & 36 Vict. c. 98)
- Treason Act 1399 c. 10 Nothing shall be accounted treason but what was made treason in the time of King Edward the Third. — repealed for England and Wales by Statute Law Revision Act 1863 (26 & 27 Vict. c. 125) and for Ireland by Statute Law (Ireland) Revision Act 1872 (35 & 36 Vict. c. 98)
- c. 11 How far sheriffs shall be charged with the ancient ferms of the county. — repealed for England and Wales by Statute Law Revision Act 1863 (26 & 27 Vict. c. 125) and for Ireland by Statute Law (Ireland) Revision Act 1872 (35 & 36 Vict. c. 98)
- c. 12 A confirmation of former statutes touching pulling down of wears. (Note: 'Wears' meaning weirs.) — repealed for England and Wales by Salmon Fishery Act 1861 (24 & 25 Vict. c. 109) and for Ireland by Statute Law (Ireland) Revision Act 1872 (35 & 36 Vict. c. 98)
- c. 13 Customers, controllers, searchers, &c. shall be removable at the King's pleasure, and shall be resident upon their offices. — repealed by Customs Law Repeal Act 1825 (6 Geo. 4. c. 105)
- c. 14 Where all sorts of appeals shall be tried and determined. — repealed for England and Wales by Statute Law Revision Act 1863 (26 & 27 Vict. c. 125) and for Ireland by Statute Law (Ireland) Revision Act 1872 (35 & 36 Vict. c. 98)
- (London) c. 15 The punishment of the mayor, &c. of London, for defaults committed there. — repealed by Repeal of Obsolete Statutes Act 1856 (19 & 20 Vict. c. 64)
- c. 16 Merchants of London shall be as free to pack their cloths as other merchants. — repealed for England and Wales by Statute Law Revision Act 1863 (26 & 27 Vict. c. 125) and for Ireland by Statute Law (Ireland) Revision Act 1872 (35 & 36 Vict. c. 98)
- c. 17 Strangers may buy and sell within the realm victuals in grose or by retail. — repealed by Repeal of Acts Concerning Importation Act 1822 (3 Geo. 4. c. 41)
- c. 18 Process against one of the county of Chester, which committeth an offence in another shire. — repealed for England and Wales by Statute Law Revision Act 1863 (26 & 27 Vict. c. 125) and for Ireland by Statute Law (Ireland) Revision Act 1872 (35 & 36 Vict. c. 98)
- c. 19 During three years, for no cloth whereof the dozen exceedeth not 13s. 4d. any subsidy shall be paid, or shall he sealed. — repealed for England and Wales by Statute Law Revision Act 1863 (26 & 27 Vict. c. 125) and for Ireland by Statute Law (Ireland) Revision Act 1872 (35 & 36 Vict. c. 98)
- (Pardon) c. 20 The King's pardon of treason, felony, outlawry, &c. to all them that will pursue their charters before the feast of All Saints, with some exceptions. — repealed for England and Wales by Statute Law Revision Act 1863 (26 & 27 Vict. c. 125) and for Ireland by Statute Law (Ireland) Revision Act 1872 (35 & 36 Vict. c. 98)

=== Sources ===
- Chronological Table of and Index to the Statutes. Vol. 1: To the End of the Session 59 Vict. Sess. 2 (1895) (13th ed.). London: Her Majesty's Stationery Office. 1896. p. 31 – via Google Books.
- Chronological Table of the Statutes: Covering the Period from 1235 to the End of 1971. London: Her Majesty's Stationery Office. 1972. p. 27. ISBN 978-0-11-840096-1 – via Google Books.

== 1400 (2 Hen. 4) ==
The 2nd Parliament of King Henry IV, which met at Westminster from 20 January 1401 until 10 March 1401.

This session was also traditionally cited as 2 H. 4.

- Free Access to Courts Act 1400 c. 1 A confirmation of liberties. Each person may pursue the law, or defend it. — repealed for England and Wales by Statute Law Revision Act 1863 (26 & 27 Vict. c. 125) and for Ireland by Statute Law (Ireland) Revision Act 1872 (35 & 36 Vict. c. 98)
- Petitions to the King for Lands Act 1400 c. 2 An exposition of part of the statute of 1 Hen. IV. c. 6. (Note: 1 Hen. 4. c. 6) touching the mentioning of other gifts which a petitioner hath received of the King or his predecessors. — repealed by Statute Law Revision Act 1887 (50 & 51 Vict. c. 59)
- (Extension of the Statute of Provisors) c. 3 If any do accept a provision granted by the pope to a religious person to be exempt from obedience, he shall be within the danger of the statute of provisors. (Note: Statute of Provisors (25 Edw. 3. Stat. 4)) — repealed by Statute Law Revision Act 1948 (11 & 12 Geo. 6. c. 62)
- (Purchasing bulls to be discharged of tithes) c. 4 The penalties for purchasing of bulls to be discharged of tithes. — repealed by Statute Law Revision Act 1887 (50 & 51 Vict. c. 59)
- (Exportation of gold or silver) c. 5 He that carrieth gold or silver out of the realm shall confess so much. — repealed for England and Wales by Statute Law Revision Act 1863 (26 & 27 Vict. c. 125) and for Ireland by Statute Law (Ireland) Revision Act 1872 (35 & 36 Vict. c. 98)
- (Foreign coin) c. 6 The money of Scotland, and of other countries beyond the sea, shall be voided out of England, or put to coin before Christmas. — repealed for England and Wales by the Continuance, etc. of Laws Act 1623 (21 Jas. 1. c. 28), confirmed for the United Kingdom by Repeal of Acts Concerning Importation Act 1822 (3 Geo. 4. c. 41)
- (No nonsuit after verdict) c. 7 In what case the plaintiff shall not be nonsuit if the verdict pass against him. — repealed by Civil Procedure Acts Repeal Act 1879 (42 & 43 Vict. c. 59)
- (Fines) c. 8 The fee of the cyrographer of the common pleas for a fine levied. — repealed for England and Wales by Statute Law Revision Act 1863 (26 & 27 Vict. c. 125) and for Ireland by Statute Law (Ireland) Revision Act 1872 (35 & 36 Vict. c. 98)
- (Relief of certain commissioners) c. 9 Such as were commissions in the time of King Rich. II. and spoiled thereof, or that delivered the same, shall be discharged by their oaths. — repealed for England and Wales by Statute Law Revision Act 1863 (26 & 27 Vict. c. 125) and for Ireland by Statute Law (Ireland) Revision Act 1872 (35 & 36 Vict. c. 98)
- (Clerk of the Crown, Queen's Bench) c. 10 The fee of the clerk of the crown of the King's bench for indictments. — repealed for England and Wales by Statute Law Revision Act 1863 (26 & 27 Vict. c. 125) and for Ireland by Statute Law (Ireland) Revision Act 1872 (35 & 36 Vict. c. 98)
- (Admiralty jurisdiction) c. 11 A remedy for him who is wrongfully pursued in the court of admiralty. — repealed for England and Wales by Admiralty Court Act 1861 (24 & 25 Vict. c. 10) and for Ireland by Statute Law (Ireland) Revision Act 1872 (35 & 36 Vict. c. 98)
- (Welshmen) c. 12 Certain restraints laid on wholly born Welshmen. — repealed by Continuance, etc. of Laws Act 1623 (21 Jas. 1. c. 28) and for Ireland by Statute Law (Ireland) Revision Act 1872 (35 & 36 Vict. c. 98)
- (Pardon) c. 13 The effect of the pardon granted by stat. 21 R. II. c. 15. (Note: 21 Ric. 2. c. 15) rehearsed and confirmed, notwithstanding the residue of the said parliament is repealed. — repealed for England and Wales by Statute Law Revision Act 1863 (26 & 27 Vict. c. 125) and for Ireland by Statute Law (Ireland) Revision Act 1872 (35 & 36 Vict. c. 98)
- (Purveyance) c. 14 Purveyance for the King's house of 40 s. or under, shall be presently paid for. — repealed for England and Wales by Statute Law Revision Act 1863 (26 & 27 Vict. c. 125) and for Ireland by Statute Law (Ireland) Revision Act 1872 (35 & 36 Vict. c. 98)
- Suppression of Heresy Act 1400 or De heretico comburendo c. 15 The orthodoxy of the faith of the church of England asserted, and provision made against the oppugners of the same; with the punishment of Hereticks. — repealed for England and Wales by Act of Supremacy 1558 (1 Eliz. 1. c. 1) and for Ireland by Statute Law (Ireland) Revision Act 1872 (35 & 36 Vict. c. 98)
- (Wales and Welshmen) c. 16 If Welshmen do not restore to Englishmen the distresses taken by them within within seven days, Englishmen may return the like measure to them. — repealed by Continuance, etc. of Laws Act 1623 (21 Jas. 1. c. 28) and for Ireland by Statute Law (Ireland) Revision Act 1872 (35 & 36 Vict. c. 98)
- (Wales and Welshmen) c. 17 If a Welshman commit a felony in England, and thereof is attainted, and after flieth into Wales, upon certificate of the King's justices he shall be executed. — repealed by Continuance, etc. of Laws Act 1623 (21 Jas. 1. c. 28) and for Ireland by Statute Law (Ireland) Revision Act 1872 (35 & 36 Vict. c. 98)
- (Wales and Welshmen) c. 18 Lords marchers in Wales shall keep sufficient guards in their castles. — repealed by Continuance, etc. of Laws Act 1623 (21 Jas. 1. c. 28) and for Ireland by Statute Law (Ireland) Revision Act 1872 (35 & 36 Vict. c. 98)
- (Wales) c. 19 No Englishman shall be condemned at the suit of a Welshman in Wales, but only by English justices, or English burgesses. — repealed for England and Wales by Statute Law Revision Act 1863 (26 & 27 Vict. c. 125) and for Ireland by Statute Law (Ireland) Revision Act 1872 (35 & 36 Vict. c. 98)
- (Welshmen) c. 20 No Welshman shall purchase land in England, nor in the English towns in Wales. — repealed by Continuance, etc. of Laws Act 1623 (21 Jas. 1. c. 28) and for Ireland by Statute Law (Ireland) Revision Act 1872 (35 & 36 Vict. c. 98)
- (Liveries) c. 21 No lord shall give any livery or sign to knight, esquire, or yeoman. — repealed for England and Wales by Statute Law Revision Act 1863 (26 & 27 Vict. c. 125) and for Ireland by Statute Law (Ireland) Revision Act 1872 (35 & 36 Vict. c. 98)
- (Suits for pardon) c. 22 Suits may be prosecuted against certain persons meant to be protected by the statute of 11 Rich. II. c. 1 & 2. (Note: 11 Ric. 2. cc. 1 & 2) — repealed for England and Wales by Statute Law Revision Act 1863 (26 & 27 Vict. c. 125) and for Ireland by Statute Law (Ireland) Revision Act 1872 (35 & 36 Vict. c. 98)
- Marshalsea Court Act 1400 c. 23 The fees of the marshal of the marshalsea of the King's house. — repealed for England and Wales by Statute Law Revision Act 1863 (26 & 27 Vict. c. 125) and for Ireland by Statute Law (Ireland) Revision Act 1872 (35 & 36 Vict. c. 98)
- (Wages for serving with Duke of York) c. 24 Process against those that were with the duke of York, 23 Rich. 2. for their wages then received shall be discharged. — repealed for England and Wales by Statute Law Revision Act 1863 (26 & 27 Vict. c. 125) and for Ireland by Statute Law (Ireland) Revision Act 1872 (35 & 36 Vict. c. 98)

=== Sources ===
- Chronological Table of and Index to the Statutes. Vol. 1: To the End of the Session 59 Vict. Sess. 2 (1895) (13th ed.). London: Her Majesty's Stationery Office. 1896. pp. 31–32 – via Google Books.
- Chronological Table of the Statutes: Covering the Period from 1235 to the End of 1971. London: Her Majesty's Stationery Office. 1972. p. 27. ISBN 978-0-11-840096-1 – via Google Books.

== 1402 (4 Hen. 4) ==
The 3rd Parliament of King Henry IV, which met at Westminster from 30 September 1402 until 25 November 1402.

This session was also traditionally cited as 4 H. 4.

- (Confirmation of liberties, etc.) c. 1 A confirmation of the liberties of the church, and of all corporations and persons. — repealed for England and Wales by Statute Law Revision Act 1863 (26 & 27 Vict. c. 125) and for Ireland by Statute Law (Ireland) Revision Act 1872 (35 & 36 Vict. c. 98)
- (Indictments, etc.) c. 2 The words Infidiatores viarum, (Note: Infidiatores viarum is Latin for 'trespassers of the roads'.) &c. shall not be put in any indictments, &c. — repealed for England and Wales by Statute Law Revision Act 1863 (26 & 27 Vict. c. 125) and for Ireland by Statute Law (Ireland) Revision Act 1872 (35 & 36 Vict. c. 98)
- Benefit of Clergy Act 1402 c. 3 A confirmation of the liberties of the church and clergy. A clerk convict for treason, or being a common thief, shall not make his purgation. — repealed for England and Wales by Statute Law Revision Act 1863 (26 & 27 Vict. c. 125) and for Ireland by Statute Law (Ireland) Revision Act 1872 (35 & 36 Vict. c. 98)
- (Crown grants) c. 4 The King will grant no lands, &c. but to such as shall deserve them. The punishment of those who shall make any demand without desert. — repealed for England and Wales by Statute Law Revision Act 1863 (26 & 27 Vict. c. 125) and for Ireland by Statute Law (Ireland) Revision Act 1872 (35 & 36 Vict. c. 98)
- (Sheriffs) c. 5 Every sheriff shall in person continue in his bailiwick, and shall not let it. — repealed by Repeal of Obsolete Statutes Act 1856 (19 & 20 Vict. c. 64)
- (Cloths) c. 6 A seal of lead shall he provided to seal cloths wrought in London and the suburbs. — repealed for England and Wales by Statute Law Revision Act 1863 (26 & 27 Vict. c. 125) and for Ireland by Statute Law (Ireland) Revision Act 1872 (35 & 36 Vict. c. 98)
- (Real actions) c. 7 The disseisee shall have an assise against the disseisor taking the profits. — repealed for England and Wales by Statute Law Revision Act 1863 (26 & 27 Vict. c. 125) and for Ireland by Statute Law (Ireland) Revision Act 1872 (35 & 36 Vict. c. 98)
- (Forcible entries) c. 8 In what cases a special assise is maintainable against a disseisor with force. — repealed for England and Wales by Statute Law Revision Act 1863 (26 & 27 Vict. c. 125) and for Ireland by Statute Law (Ireland) Revision Act 1872 (35 & 36 Vict. c. 98)
- (Relief of commissioners) c. 9 A remedy to discharge commissioners distraiaed to return commissions. — repealed for England and Wales by Statute Law Revision Act 1863 (26 & 27 Vict. c. 125) and for Ireland by Statute Law (Ireland) Revision Act 1872 (35 & 36 Vict. c. 98)
- (Coinage) c. 10 The third part of the silver brought to the bullion, shall be coined in halfpence and farthings. — repealed by Repeal of Obsolete Statutes Act 1856 (19 & 20 Vict. c. 64)
- Weirs Act 1402 c. 11 Commissions shall be awarded to justices, &c. to enquire of wears, kidels, &c. — repealed for England and Wales by Salmon Fishery Act 1861 (24 & 25 Vict. c. 109) and for Ireland by Statute Law (Ireland) Revision Act 1872 (35 & 36 Vict. c. 98)
- Enforcement of 15 Ric. 2 c. 6 Act 1402 c. 12 In appropriations of benefices provision shall be made for the poor and the vicar. — repealed for Northern Ireland by Statute Law Revision Act 1950 (14 Geo. 6. c. 6) and for England and Wales by Statute Law (Repeals) Act 1969 (c. 52)
- (Military service) c. 13 A confirmation of the statutes of 1 Edw. 3. stat. 2. c. 5. 18 Edw. 3. stat. 2. c. 7. and 25 Edw. 3. stat. 5. c. 8 touching service in war. — repealed for England and Wales by Statute Law Revision Act 1863 (26 & 27 Vict. c. 125) and for Ireland by Statute Law (Ireland) Revision Act 1872 (35 & 36 Vict. c. 98)
- (Labourers) c. 14 A labourer shall not be retained to work by the week. — repealed for England and Wales by Statute Law Revision Act 1863 (26 & 27 Vict. c. 125) and for Ireland by Statute Law (Ireland) Revision Act 1872 (35 & 36 Vict. c. 98)
- (Exportation of gold and silver) c. 15 Merchants shall bestow their money received upon other merchandises of this realm. — repealed by Repeal of Acts Concerning Importation Act 1822 (3 Geo. 4. c. 41)
- (Exportation of gold and silver) c. 16 No person shall carry gold or silver out of the realm without the King's licence. — repealed by Repeal of Acts Concerning Importation Act 1822 (3 Geo. 4. c. 41)
- (Monastic orders) c. 17 Infants are not to be received into the order of friars without the consent of their parents, &c. — repealed for England and Wales by Statute Law Revision Act 1863 (26 & 27 Vict. c. 125) and for Ireland by Statute Law (Ireland) Revision Act 1872 (35 & 36 Vict. c. 98)
- (Attorneys) c. 18 The punishment of an attorney found in default. — repealed for England and Wales by Solicitors Act 1843 (6 & 7 Vict. c. 73) and for Ireland by Statute Law (Ireland) Revision Act 1872 (35 & 36 Vict. c. 98)
- (Attorneys) c. 19 No officer of a lord of a franchise shall be attorney in the same. — repealed for England and Wales by Solicitors Act 1843 (6 & 7 Vict. c. 73) and for Ireland by Statute Law (Ireland) Revision Act 1872 (35 & 36 Vict. c. 98)
- (Customs) c. 20 Customers, controllers, &c. shall abide upon their office, and make no deputies; and every customer shall be sworn to answer the King all profits. — repealed by Customs Law Repeal Act 1825 (6 Geo. 4. c. 105)
- (Customs) c. 21 Searchers shall not let any their offices to ferm, or occupy them by deputy. — repealed by Repeal of Acts Concerning Importation Act 1822 (3 Geo. 4. c. 41) and Customs Law Repeal Act 1825 (6 Geo. 4. c. 105)
- (King's presentation to benefices) c. 22 The remedy where by the King's presentation any Incumbent is put forth. — repealed by Statute Law Revision Act 1948 (11 & 12 Geo. 6. c. 62)
- Judgments Act 1402 c. 23 Judgments given shall continue until they shall be reversed by attaint or error. — repealed by Civil Procedure Acts Repeal Act 1879 (42 & 43 Vict. c. 59)
- (Cloths) c. 24 Aulnage of cloths may be let to ferm by improvement. — repealed for England and Wales by Statute Law Revision Act 1863 (26 & 27 Vict. c. 125) and for Ireland by Statute Law (Ireland) Revision Act 1872 (35 & 36 Vict. c. 98)
- (Hostlers) c. 25 An hostlers shall not make horse-bread. How much he may take for oats. — repealed by Forestalling, Regrating, etc. Act 1844 (7 & 8 Vict. c. 24)
- Penal laws against the Welsh (Wales) c. 26 Englishmen shall not be convicted by Welshmen in Wales. — repealed for England and Wales by Statute Law Revision Act 1863 (26 & 27 Vict. c. 125) and for Ireland by Statute Law (Ireland) Revision Act 1872 (35 & 36 Vict. c. 98)
- Penal laws against the Welsh (Wales) c. 27 There shall be no wasters, vagabonds, &c. in Wales. — repealed by Repeal of Obsolete Statutes Act 1856 (19 & 20 Vict. c. 64)
- Penal laws against the Welsh (Wales) c. 28 There shall be no congregations in Wales. — repealed for England and Wales by Continuance, etc. of Laws Act 1623 (21 Jas. 1. c. 28) and for Ireland by Statute Law (Ireland) Revision Act 1872 (35 & 36 Vict. c. 98)
- (Welshmen) c. 29 Welshmen shall not be armed. — repealed by Repeal of Obsolete Statutes Act 1856 (19 & 20 Vict. c. 64)
- (Wales) c. 30 No victual or armour shall be carried into Wales. — repealed for England and Wales by Statute Law Revision Act 1863 (26 & 27 Vict. c. 125) and for Ireland by Statute Law (Ireland) Revision Act 1872 (35 & 36 Vict. c. 98)
- (Wales and Welshmen) c. 31 A Welshman shall not have any house of defence. — repealed for England and Wales by Continuance, etc. of Laws Act 1623 (21 Jas. 1. c. 28) and for Ireland by Statute Law (Ireland) Revision Act 1872 (35 & 36 Vict. c. 98)
- (Wales and Welshmen) c. 32 No Welshman shall be an officer. — repealed for England and Wales by Continuance, etc. of Laws Act 1623 (21 Jas. 1. c. 28) and for Ireland by Statute Law (Ireland) Revision Act 1872 (35 & 36 Vict. c. 98)
- (Wales and Welshmen) c. 33 Castles and walled towns in Wales shall he kept by Englishmen. — repealed for England and Wales by Continuance, etc. of Laws Act 1623 (21 Jas. 1. c. 28) and for Ireland by Statute Law (Ireland) Revision Act 1872 (35 & 36 Vict. c. 98)
- (Wales and Welshmen) c. 34 No English Man that marrieth a Welsh Woman shall be in any office in Wales. — repealed for England and Wales by Continuance, etc. of Laws Act 1623 (21 Jas. 1. c. 28) and for Ireland by Statute Law (Ireland) Revision Act 1872 (35 & 36 Vict. c. 98)
- (Tanning) c. 35 Shoemakers and cordwainers may tan leather, notwithstanding the statute of 13 Rich. II. stat. 2. c. 12. (Note: 13 Ric. 2. Stat. 2. c. 12) — repealed for England and Wales by Statute Law Revision Act 1863 (26 & 27 Vict. c. 125) and for Ireland by Statute Law (Ireland) Revision Act 1872 (35 & 36 Vict. c. 98)

=== Sources ===
- Chronological Table of and Index to the Statutes. Vol. 1: To the End of the Session 59 Vict. Sess. 2 (1895) (13th ed.). London: Her Majesty's Stationery Office. 1896. p. 32 – via Google Books.
- Chronological Table of the Statutes: Covering the Period from 1235 to the End of 1971. London: Her Majesty's Stationery Office. 1972. p. 28. ISBN 978-0-11-840096-1 – via Google Books.

== 1403 (5 Hen. 4) ==
The 4th Parliament of King Henry IV, which met at Westminster from 14 January 1404 until 20 March 1404.

This session was also traditionally cited as 5 H. 4.

- (Certain Traitors' Lands (not forfeited if seized to uses)) c. 1 Lands assigned to certain traitors to the use of others shall not be forfeited to the King. — repealed by Statute Law Revision Act 1948 (11 & 12 Geo. 6. c. 62)
- (Approvers) c. 2 The penalty of him which procureth pardon for an approver that committeth felony again. — repealed by Repeal of Obsolete Statutes Act 1856 (19 & 20 Vict. c. 64)
- (Watching) c. 3 Watches shall be made upon the coasts as they were wont to be. — repealed for England and Wales by Statute Law Revision Act 1863 (26 & 27 Vict. c. 125) and for Ireland by Statute Law (Ireland) Revision Act 1872 (35 & 36 Vict. c. 98)
- Gold and Silver Act 1404 or Multipliers Act 1404 or Alchemy Act 1403 or An Act Against Multipliers c. 4 It shall be felony to use the craft of multiplication of gold or silver. — repealed by Royal Mines Act 1688 (1 Will. & Mar. c. 30)
- (Maiming) c. 5 It shall be felony to cut out the tongue, or pull out the eyes of the King's liege people. — repealed for England and Wales by Offences Against the Person Act 1828 (9 Geo. 4. c. 31), for Ireland by Offences Against the Person (Ireland) Act 1829 (10 Geo. 4. c. 34) and for India by Criminal Law (India) Act 1828 (9 Geo. 4. c. 74)
- (Assaulting Servants of Knights of Parliament) c. 6 The penalty for making an assault upon any servant of any knight in parliament. — repealed for England and Wales by Offences Against the Person Act 1828 (9 Geo. 4. c. 31), for Ireland by Offences Against the Person (Ireland) Act 1829 (10 Geo. 4. c. 34) and for India by Criminal Law (India) Act 1828 (9 Geo. 4. c. 74)
- (Merchant Strangers) c. 7 Merchant strangers shall be used in this realm, as denizens be in others. — repealed by Repeal of Acts Concerning Importation Act 1822 (3 Geo. 4. c. 41)
- (Wager of Law) c. 8 In what cases the defendant may be allowed to wage his law, or plead to an inquest. — repealed for England and Wales by Statute Law Revision Act 1863 (26 & 27 Vict. c. 125) and for Ireland by Statute Law (Ireland) Revision Act 1872 (35 & 36 Vict. c. 98)
- Trade Act 1403 c. 9 Merchants aliens shall employ their money upon the commodities of this realm. — repealed for England and Wales by Statute Law Revision Act 1863 (26 & 27 Vict. c. 125) and for Ireland by Statute Law (Ireland) Revision Act 1872 (35 & 36 Vict. c. 98)
- (Imprisonment by Justice of the Peace) c. 10 Justices of peace shall imprison none but in the common gaol. — repealed by Statute Law Revision Act 1948 (11 & 12 Geo. 6. c. 62)
- (Payment of Tithes of Aliens' Lands) c. 11 The fermors of aliens shall pay their tithes to the parson of the same parishes. — repealed by Statute Law Revision Act 1948 (11 & 12 Geo. 6. c. 62)
- (Execution on Statute Merchant) c. 12 Execution may be awarded, upon a statute once shewed in court. — repealed for England and Wales by Statute Law Revision Act 1863 (26 & 27 Vict. c. 125) and for Ireland by Statute Law (Ireland) Revision Act 1872 (35 & 36 Vict. c. 98)
- (Plating) c. 13 What things may be gilded and laid on with silver or gold, and what not. — repealed by Repeal of Obsolete Statutes Act 1856 (19 & 20 Vict. c. 64)
- (Fines) c. 14 Inrolling of writs in the common place whereupon fines be levied. — repealed for England and Wales by Statute Law Revision Act 1863 (26 & 27 Vict. c. 125) and for Ireland by Statute Law (Ireland) Revision Act 1872 (35 & 36 Vict. c. 98)
- (Pardon) c. 15 The King's pardon of the suit of his peace, treasons, rebellious trespasses, &c. with some exceptions. — repealed for England and Wales by Statute Law Revision Act 1863 (26 & 27 Vict. c. 125) and for Ireland by Statute Law (Ireland) Revision Act 1872 (35 & 36 Vict. c. 98)

=== Sources ===
- Chronological Table of and Index to the Statutes. Vol. 1: To the End of the Session 59 Vict. Sess. 2 (1895) (13th ed.). London: Her Majesty's Stationery Office. 1896. pp. 32–33 – via Google Books.
- Chronological Table of the Statutes: Covering the Period from 1235 to the End of 1971. London: Her Majesty's Stationery Office. 1972. p. 28. ISBN 978-0-11-840096-1 – via Google Books.

== 1404 (6 Hen. 4) ==
The 5th Parliament of King Henry IV, which met at Coventry from 6 October 1404 until 13 November 1404.

This session was also traditionally cited as 6 H. 4.

- (First fruits) c. 1 The penalty of those which pay to the court of Rome more for the first-fruits of any bishoprick, &c. than had wont to be paid. — repealed for England and Wales by Statute Law Revision Act 1863 (26 & 27 Vict. c. 125) and for Ireland by Statute Law (Ireland) Revision Act 1872 (35 & 36 Vict. c. 98)
- (Petitions to the King for Lands) c. 2 The statute of 1 H. IV. c. 6. (Note: Petitions to the King for Lands 1399 (1 Hen. 4. c. 6)) touching petitions to be made to the King for lands, offices, &c. shall not extend to the Queen or princes. — repealed by Statute Law Revision Act 1887 (50 & 51 Vict. c. 59)
- (Sheriffs, Escheators, etc.) c. 3 Commissions shall be sent to inquire of the accompt of sheriffs, escheators, &c. — repealed for England and Wales by Statute Law Revision Act 1863 (26 & 27 Vict. c. 125) and for Ireland by Statute Law (Ireland) Revision Act 1872 (35 & 36 Vict. c. 98)
- (Exportation) c. 4 Aliens shall not carry forth of the realm merchandises brought in by aliens. — repealed for England and Wales by Statute Law Revision Act 1863 (26 & 27 Vict. c. 125) and for Ireland by Statute Law (Ireland) Revision Act 1872 (35 & 36 Vict. c. 98)

=== Sources ===
- Chronological Table of and Index to the Statutes. Vol. 1: To the End of the Session 59 Vict. Sess. 2 (1895) (13th ed.). London: Her Majesty's Stationery Office. 1896. p. 33 – via Google Books.
- Chronological Table of the Statutes: Covering the Period from 1235 to the End of 1971. London: Her Majesty's Stationery Office. 1972. p. 28. ISBN 978-0-11-840096-1 – via Google Books.

== 1405 (7 Hen. 4) ==
The 6th Parliament of King Henry IV, which met at Westminster from 1 March 1406 until 22 December 1406.

This session was also traditionally cited as 7 H. 4.

- (Confirmation of Liberties) c. 1 A confirmation of the liberties of the church, and of all cities and persons, &c. and of all statutes not repealed. Peace shall be kept, &c. —
  still in force
- (Succession to the Crown) c. 2 The realms of England and France intailed to the King and his four sons by name. — repealed by Statute Law Revision Act 1948 (11 & 12 Geo. 6. c. 62)
- (Fines and Forfeitures) c. 3 The rolls of estreats (Note: An estreat was a copy of a record of a fine or forfeiture due to the Treasury.) shall be made certain. — repealed by Statute Law Revision and Civil Procedure Act 1881 (44 & 45 Vict. c. 59)
- (Protections) c. 4 No protection allowable for a gaoler which letteth a prisoner escape. — repealed for England and Wales by Statute Law Revision Act 1863 (26 & 27 Vict. c. 125) and for Ireland by Statute Law (Ireland) Revision Act 1872 (35 & 36 Vict. c. 98)
- (Lands of Percy and Bardolf (not forfeited if seized to uses)) c. 5 The King shall not have the forfeiture of those lands whereof certain traitors were seised to the use of others.— repealed by Statute Law Revision Act 1948 (11 & 12 Geo. 6. c. 62)
- (Bulls to be Discharged of Tithes) c. 6 The penalty of him which purchaseth a bull to be discharged of tithes. — repealed by Statute Law Revision Act 1887 (50 & 51 Vict. c. 59)
- (Arrowheads) c. 7 Arrow-heads shall be well boiled, brased, and hard. — repealed by Repeal of Obsolete Statutes Act 1856 (19 & 20 Vict. c. 64)
- (Benefices) c. 8 No provision, licence, or pardon shall be granted of a benefice full of an incumbent. — repealed for England and Wales by Statute Law Revision Act 1863 (26 & 27 Vict. c. 125) and for Ireland by Statute Law (Ireland) Revision Act 1872 (35 & 36 Vict. c. 98)
- Sales in Gross (London) Act 1405 c. 9 All merchandises may be sold in gross, as well to all others, as to citizens of London. — repealed by Statute Law (Repeals) Act 1969 (c. 52)
- Cloths Act 1405 c. 10 The length and breadth of cloth of ray and coloured. — repealed for England and Wales by Statute Law Revision Act 1863 (26 & 27 Vict. c. 125) and for Ireland by Statute Law (Ireland) Revision Act 1872 (35 & 36 Vict. c. 98)
- (Relief of Commissioners) c. 11 Commissioners not receiving a commission, shall be discharged upon oath. — repealed for England and Wales by Statute Law Revision Act 1863 (26 & 27 Vict. c. 125) and for Ireland by Statute Law (Ireland) Revision Act 1872 (35 & 36 Vict. c. 98)
- (Certain traitors' lands (not forfeited if seized to uses)) c. 12 Those lands shall not he forfeited to the King, whereof traitors were seized to the use of others. — repealed by Statute Law Revision Act 1948 (11 & 12 Geo. 6. c. 62)
- (Attorneys in Outlawry) c. 13 Impotent persons that be outlawed may make attornies. — repealed by Civil Procedure Acts Repeal Act 1879 (42 & 43 Vict. c. 59)
- Liveries Act 1405 c. 14 The statute of 1 Hen. 4. c. 7. and 1 Rich. 2. c. 7. touching the giving and taking of liveries confirmed. No congregation of company shall make any livery of cloth or hats. — repealed for England and Wales by Continuance of Laws, etc. Act 1627 (3 Cha. 1. c. 5) and for Ireland by Statute Law (Ireland) Revision Act 1872 (35 & 36 Vict. c. 98)
- Election of Knights of Shires Act 1405 c. 15 The manner of the election of knights of shires for a parliament. — repealed by Ballot Act 1872
- (Annuities from the Crown) c. 16 Annuities granted by the King or his ancestors, of an elder date, shall be paid before them that were granted of a later date. — repealed for England and Wales by Statute Law Revision Act 1863 (26 & 27 Vict. c. 125) and for Ireland by Statute Law (Ireland) Revision Act 1872 (35 & 36 Vict. c. 98)
- Labourers Act 1405 c. 17 No man shall put his son or his daughter to be an apprentice unless he have twenty shillings in land or rent; but every person may put his son or daughter to school. (Note: Among other things this chapter penalised "every town or seignory that faileth of their stocks, so that they be not made before the feast of Easter next coming".) — repealed for England and Wales by Statute Law Revision Act 1863 (26 & 27 Vict. c. 125) and for Ireland by Statute Law (Ireland) Revision Act 1872 (35 & 36 Vict. c. 98)
- (Pardon) c. 18 None shall he punished for repressing of the late riots — repealed for England and Wales by Statute Law Revision Act 1863 (26 & 27 Vict. c. 125) and for Ireland by Statute Law (Ireland) Revision Act 1872 (35 & 36 Vict. c. 98)

=== Sources ===
- Chronological Table of and Index to the Statutes. Vol. 1: To the End of the Session 59 Vict. Sess. 2 (1895) (13th ed.). London: Her Majesty's Stationery Office. 1896. p. 33 – via Google Books.
- Chronological Table of the Statutes: Covering the Period from 1235 to the End of 1971. London: Her Majesty's Stationery Office. 1972. pp. 28–29. ISBN 978-0-11-840096-1 – via Google Books.
- "Acts of the English Parliament from 1405". legislation.gov.uk. The National Archives.

== 1407 (9 Hen. 4) ==
The 7th Parliament of King Henry IV, which met at Gloucester from 20 October 1407 until 2 December 1407.

This session was also traditionally cited as 9 H. 4.

- (Confirmation of Liberties) c. 1 A confirmation of all liberties, except those granted to the scholars of Oxford. — repealed for England and Wales by Statute Law Revision Act 1863 (26 & 27 Vict. c. 125) and for Ireland by Statute Law (Ireland) Revision Act 1872 (35 & 36 Vict. c. 98)
- (Aulnage) c. 2 Kendal cloth shall not be sealed, nor aulnage paid for it. — repealed for England and Wales by Statute Law Revision Act 1863 (26 & 27 Vict. c. 125) and for Ireland by Statute Law (Ireland) Revision Act 1872 (35 & 36 Vict. c. 98)
- c. 3 Felons in South Wales shall be taken, or the country shall satisfy for their offences. — repealed for England and Wales by Continuance, etc. of Laws Act 1623 (21 Jas. 1. c. 28) and for Ireland by Statute Law (Ireland) Revision Act 1872 (35 & 36 Vict. c. 98)
- c. 4 Disclaimers in felony in Wales shall be utterly excluded and put out. — repealed for England and Wales by Statute Law Revision Act 1863 (26 & 27 Vict. c. 125) and for Ireland by Statute Law (Ireland) Revision Act 1872 (35 & 36 Vict. c. 98)
- c. 5 Lords of ancient demesne, or mayors, &c. name disseissors in assise, to take away their franchise. — repealed for England and Wales by Statute Law Revision Act 1863 (26 & 27 Vict. c. 125) and for Ireland by Statute Law (Ireland) Revision Act 1872 (35 & 36 Vict. c. 98)
- Cloths Act 1407 c. 6 A repeal of the statute of 7 Hen. 4. cap. 10. (Note: Cloths Act 1405 (7 Hen. 4. c. 10)) touching the length and breadth of cloth of ray. — repealed for England and Wales by Statute Law Revision Act 1863 (26 & 27 Vict. c. 125) and for Ireland by Statute Law (Ireland) Revision Act 1872 (35 & 36 Vict. c. 98)
- c. 7 Goods shall be chargeable for the payment of the quinzime, where they were at the time when the same was granted. — repealed for England and Wales by Statute Law Revision Act 1863 (26 & 27 Vict. c. 125) and for Ireland by Statute Law (Ireland) Revision Act 1872 (35 & 36 Vict. c. 98)
- c. 8 The carrying of money out of the realm to the court of Rome prohibited; and all statutes against provisors, and translation of archbishopricks, &c. confirmed. — repealed for England and Wales by Statute Law Revision Act 1863 (26 & 27 Vict. c. 125) and for Ireland by Statute Law (Ireland) Revision Act 1872 (35 & 36 Vict. c. 98)
- c. 9 Elections to spiritual promotions shall be free, and not interrupted by the pope or the King. — repealed for England and Wales by Statute Law Revision Act 1863 (26 & 27 Vict. c. 125) and for Ireland by Statute Law (Ireland) Revision Act 1872 (35 & 36 Vict. c. 98)
- c. 10 A pardon granted by the King to all that have purchased provisions, or translations to archbishopricks, bishopricks, &c. — repealed for England and Wales by Statute Law Revision Act 1863 (26 & 27 Vict. c. 125) and for Ireland by Statute Law (Ireland) Revision Act 1872 (35 & 36 Vict. c. 98)

=== Sources ===
- Chronological Table of and Index to the Statutes. Vol. 1: To the End of the Session 59 Vict. Sess. 2 (1895) (13th ed.). London: Her Majesty's Stationery Office. 1896. p. 33 – via Google Books.
- Chronological Table of the Statutes: Covering the Period from 1235 to the End of 1971. London: Her Majesty's Stationery Office. 1972. p. 29. ISBN 978-0-11-840096-1 – via Google Books.

== 1409 (11 Hen. 4) ==
The 8th Parliament of King Henry IV, which met at Westminster from 27 January 1410 until 9 May 1410.

This session was also traditionally cited as 11 H. 4.

- (Elections to Parliament) c. 1 The penalty on a sheriff for making an untrue return of the election of the knights of parliament. — repealed by Repeal of Obsolete Statutes Act 1856 (19 & 20 Vict. c. 64)
- (Customers) c. 2 No common hosteler shall be a customer, comptroller, or searcher. — repealed by Customs Law Repeal Act 1825 (6 Geo. 4. c. 105)
- (Enrollment of Records) c. 3 Records shall not be amended or impaired after judgment inrolled. — repealed for England and Wales by Statute Law Revision Act 1863 (26 & 27 Vict. c. 125) and for Ireland by Statute Law (Ireland) Revision Act 1872 (35 & 36 Vict. c. 98)
- (Unlawful Games) c. 4 He that playeth at unlawful games prohibited by the statute of 12 Rich. 2. c. 6 (Note: 12 Ric. 2. c. 6) (Note: Prohibits the following games as unlawful – "balls as well handball as football and other games called coits, dice, bowling, calls, and other such unthrifty games.") shall be six days imprisoned. — repealed for England and Wales by Statute Law Revision Act 1863 (26 & 27 Vict. c. 125) and for Ireland by Statute Law (Ireland) Revision Act 1872 (35 & 36 Vict. c. 98)
- (Gally Half-Pence) c. 5 Gally half-pence shall not be current in payment in this realm. — repealed for England and Wales by Statute Law Revision Act 1863 (26 & 27 Vict. c. 125) and for Ireland by Statute Law (Ireland) Revision Act 1872 (35 & 36 Vict. c. 98)
- (Sealing of Cloths) c. 6 Cloths shall not be tacked and plaited together before the aulneger hath set his seal to them.
- c. 7 Merchants strangers shall pay the customs, &c. granted to the King by the commons for cloth cut in pieces, or garments, proportionably after the rate of a whole piece. — repealed for England and Wales by Statute Law Revision Act 1863 (26 & 27 Vict. c. 125) and for Ireland by Statute Law (Ireland) Revision Act 1872 (35 & 36 Vict. c. 98)
- c. 8 The lord chancellor shall send the estreats of exchanges taken of merchants into the exchequer every fifteen days. — repealed by Juries Act 1825 (6 Geo. 4. c. 50)
- (Jurors) c. 9 Jurors in indictments shall be returned by the sheriff, or bailiffs, without the denomination of any. — repealed for England and Wales by Statute Law Revision Act 1863 (26 & 27 Vict. c. 125) and for Ireland by Statute Law (Ireland) Revision Act 1872 (35 & 36 Vict. c. 98)

=== Sources ===
- Chronological Table of and Index to the Statutes. Vol. 1: To the End of the Session 59 Vict. Sess. 2 (1895) (13th ed.). London: Her Majesty's Stationery Office. 1896. p. 33 – via Google Books.
- Chronological Table of the Statutes: Covering the Period from 1235 to the End of 1971. London: Her Majesty's Stationery Office. 1972. p. 29. ISBN 978-0-11-840096-1 – via Google Books.

== 1411 (13 Hen. 4) ==
The 9th Parliament of King Henry IV, which met at Westminster from 3 November 1411 until 19 December 1411.

This session was also traditionally cited as 13 H. 4.

- (Confirmation of Liberties) c. 1 A confirmation of all liberties, saving a franchise granted to the scholars of Oxford. — repealed for England and Wales by Statute Law Revision Act 1863 (26 & 27 Vict. c. 125) and for Ireland by Statute Law (Ireland) Revision Act 1872 (35 & 36 Vict. c. 98)
- (Justices of Assize) c. 2 A confirmation of the statute of 8 Rich. 2. cap. 2. (Note: 8 Ric. 2. c. 2) touching justices of assise and gaol-delivery, for so long as it shall please the King. — repealed for England and Wales by Statute Law Revision Act 1863 (26 & 27 Vict. c. 125) and for Ireland by Statute Law (Ireland) Revision Act 1872 (35 & 36 Vict. c. 98)
- (Liveries) c. 3 A confirmation of several statutes of 1 Hen. 4. cap. 7. (Note: 1 Hen. 4. c. 7) 7 Hen. 4. cap. 12. (Note: 7 Hen. 4. c. 12) & 1 Rich. 2. cap. 7. (Note: 1 Ric. 2. c. 7) touching giving and taking of liveries. — repealed for England and Wales by Statute Law Revision Act 1863 (26 & 27 Vict. c. 125) and for Ireland by Statute Law (Ireland) Revision Act 1872 (35 & 36 Vict. c. 98)
- (Cloths) c. 4 A confirmation of the statute of 7 Hen. 4. cap. 10. (Note: 7 Hen. 4. c. 10) and 11 Hen. 4. cap. 6. (Note: 11 Hen. 4. c. 6) &c. touching the length and breadth of cloths of ray, and coloured cloths. — repealed for England and Wales by Statute Law Revision Act 1863 (26 & 27 Vict. c. 125) and for Ireland by Statute Law (Ireland) Revision Act 1872 (35 & 36 Vict. c. 98)
- (Customers) c. 5 All customers, comptrollers, &c. shall be resident upon their offices. — repealed for England and Wales by Statute Law Revision Act 1863 (26 & 27 Vict. c. 125) and for Ireland by Statute Law (Ireland) Revision Act 1872 (35 & 36 Vict. c. 98)
- (Foreign Money) c. 6 No Gally half-pence or foreign money shall be current within this realm. — repealed for England and Wales by Statute Law Revision Act 1863 (26 & 27 Vict. c. 125) and for Ireland by Statute Law (Ireland) Revision Act 1872 (35 & 36 Vict. c. 98)
- Riot Act 1411 c. 7 The justices of peace and the sheriffs shall arrest those which commit any riot, &c. inquire of them, and record their offences. — repealed by Statute Law Revision Act 1948 (11 & 12 Geo. 6. c. 62) and Criminal Law Act 1967 (c. 58)

=== Sources ===
- Chronological Table of and Index to the Statutes. Vol. 1: To the End of the Session 59 Vict. Sess. 2 (1895) (13th ed.). London: Her Majesty's Stationery Office. 1896. p. 33 – via Google Books.
- Chronological Table of the Statutes: Covering the Period from 1235 to the End of 1971. London: Her Majesty's Stationery Office. 1972. p. 29. ISBN 978-0-11-840096-1 – via Google Books.

== See also ==
- List of acts of the Parliament of England
