= Woollen Manufacture Act 1809 =

Act of the Parliament of the United Kingdom

- Act of Parliament
- Parliament of the United Kingdom
- Long title: An Act to repeal several Acts respecting the Woollen Manufacture, and to amend other Acts relating to the said Manufacture; and for allowing Persons employed in any Branch of the Woollen Manufacture to set up Trade in any Place in Great Britain.
- Citation: 49 Geo. 3. c. 109
- Introduced by: George Rose MP (Commons)
- Territorial extent: United Kingdom

Dates
- Royal assent: 15 June 1809
- Commencement: 15 June 1809 (Note: The Acts of Parliament (Commencement) Act 1793.)
- Repealed: 10 August 1872
Other legislation
| Amends | See § Repealed enactments |
| Repeals/revokes | See § Repealed enactments |
| Amended by | Statute Law Revision Act 1861 |
| Repealed by | Statute Law Revision Act 1872 (No. 2) |
| Relates to | Statute of Artificers 1562; Woollen Manufacture Act 1810; City of London Courts of Justice Act 1815; Importation (No. 4) Act 1816; Repeal of Acts Concerning Importation Act 1822; Repeal of Acts Concerning Importation (No. 2) Act 1822; Woollen Trade Act 1833; Repeal of Obsolete Statutes Act 1856; Statute Law Revision Act 1863; Statute Law (Ireland) Revision Act 1872 |

Status: Repealed

Text of statute as originally enacted

The Woollen Manufacture Act 1809 (49 Geo. 3. c. 109) was an act of the Parliament of the United Kingdom that repealed enactments relating to the manufacture of wool in the United Kingdom. The act deregulated the wool industry, heralding the transition from workshops to mills.

== Background ==
The committee appointed to consider of the state of the woollen manufacture of England reported on 19 May 1808, resolving to repeal various old acts relating to the manufacture of wool in the United Kingdom.

== Passage ==
Leave to bring in the Woollen Manufactures Bill to the House of Commons was granted to the Vice-President of the Board of Trade, George Rose MP, William Wilberforce MP and Lord Viscount Milton on 13 April 1809. The bill had its first reading in the House of Commons on 14 April 1809, presented by the Vice-President of the Board of Trade, George Rose MP. The bill had its second reading in the House of Commons on 2 May 1809 and was committed to a committee of the whole house, which met on 9 May 1809 and 19 May 1809 and reported on 25 May 1809, with amendments. The amended bill had its third reading in the House of Commons on 31 May 1809 and passed, with amendments.

The bill had its first reading in the House of Lords on 1 June 1809. The bill had its second reading in the House of Lords on 6 June 1809 and was committed to a committee of the whole house, which met and reported on 7 June 1809, without amendments. The bill had its third reading in the House of Lords on 13 June 1809 and passed, without amendments.

The bill was granted royal assent on 15 June 1809.

== Provisions ==
=== Repealed enactments ===
Section 1 of the act repealed 32 enactments, listed in that section.

| Citation | Short title | Title | Extent of repeal |
|---|---|---|---|
| 2 Edw. 3. c. 14 | Measure, etc. of Cloths Imported | A certain Act made in the Second Year of King Edward the Third, intituled, The Measure and Assize of [Cloths of Ray] and of Colour. | The whole act. |
| 13 Ric. 2. Stat. 1. c. 11 | Cloths | Another Act made in the Thirteenth Year of King Richard the Second, intituled, The Cloths of certain Counties tacked and folded, Shall not be put to Sale before they be opened. | The whole act. (Note: This act was repealed by the Statute Law (Ireland) Revision Act 1872 (35 & 36 Vict. c. 98).) |
| 17 Ric. 2. c. 2 | Cloths | Another Act made in the Seventeenth Year of King Richard the Second, intituled, Every Person may make Cloth of what Length and Breadth he will. | The whole act. (Note: This act was repealed by the Statute Law (Ireland) Revision Act 1872 (35 & 36 Vict. c. 98).) |
| 11 Hen. 6. c. 9 | Cloths | Another Act made in the. Eleventh Year of King Henry the Sixth, intituled, of what Length and Breadth Cloths called Streits shall be. | The whole act. (Note: This act was repealed by the Statute Law (Ireland) Revision Act 1872 (35 & 36 Vict. c. 98).) |
| 7 Edw. 4. c. 2 | Cloths (Devon) Act 1467 | Another Act made in the Seventh Year of King Edward the Fourth, intituled, For Cloths made in the Hundreds of Lifton, Tavistock, and Rowburgh, in Devonshire. | The whole act. |
| 1 Ric. 3. c. 8 | Cloths Act 1483 | Another Act made in the First Year of King Richard the Third, intituled, The Length and Breadth of Cloths, and the Order of dying them and Wools, the Ability of the Aulneger, and what Cloths he may feal. | The whole act. (Note: This act was repealed again by the Woollen Manufacture Act 1810 (50 Geo. 3. c. 83).) |
| 5 Hen. 8. c. 2 | Cloths Act 1513 | Another Act made in the Fifth Year of King Henry the Eighth, intituled, An Act for the true making of Cloths in Devon called White Straits. | The whole act. |
| 6 Hen. 8. c. 8 | Cloths Act 1514 | Another Act made in the Sixth Year of King Henry the Eighth, intituled, An Act concerning the making of certain Woollen Cloths in the County of Devon. | The whole act. |
| 6 Hen. 8. c. 9 | Cloths (No. 2) Act 1514 | Another Act made in the Sixth Year of the Reign of King Henry the Eighth, intituled, An Act to avoid Deceits in making of Woollen Cloths. | The whole act. |
| 25 Hen. 8. c. 18 | Cloths Act 1533 | Another Act made in the Twenty- fifth Year of King Henry the Eighth, intituled, An Act for Clothiers in Worcestershire. | The whole act. |
| 27 Hen. 8. c. 12 | Woollen Cloths Act 1535 | Another Act made in the Twenty-seventh Year of King Henry the Eighth, intituled, The Act for the true making of Cloth. | The whole act. |
| 33 Hen. 8. c. 3 | Welsh Cloths Act 1541 | Another Act made in the Thirty-third Year of King Henry the Eighth, intituled, The Bill for folding of Cloths, in North Wales. | The whole act. |
| 3 & 4 Edw. 6. c. 2 | Woollen Cloths Act 1549 | Another Act made in the Third and Fourth Years of King Edward the Sixth, intituled An Act for the true making of Woollen Cloths. | The whole act. |
| 5 & 6 Edw. 6. c. 6 | Woollen Cloth Act 1551 | Another Act made in the Fifth and Sixth Years of King Edward the Sixth, intituled, An Act for the true making of Woollen Cloth. | The whole act. (Note: The whole act was repealed by the Repeal of Obsolete Statutes Act 1856 (19 & 20 Vict. c. 64).) |
| 5 & 6 Edw. 6. c. 22 | Gig Mills Act 1551 | Another Act made in the Fifth and Sixth Years of King Edward the Sixth, intituled, An Act for putting down of Gig Mills. | The whole act. |
| 1 Mar. Sess. 3. c. 7 | Cloth Making Act 1554 | Another Act made in the First Year of Queen Mary, intituled, An Act touching Cloth making in Corporate Towns and Market Towns. | The whole act. |
| 2 & 3 Ph. & M. c. 11 | Weavers Act 1555 | Another Act made in the Second and Third Years of King Philip and Queen Mary, intituled, An Act touching Weavers. | The whole act. |
| 2 & 3 Ph. & M. c. 12 | Cloths Act 1555 | Another Act made in the Second and Third Years of King Philip and Queen Mary, intituled, An Act for the fealing and viewing of Clothes commonly called Bridgewaters. | The whole act. |
| 4 & 5 Ph. & M. c. 5 | Woollen Cloths Act 1557 | Another Act made in the Fourth and Fifth Year of King Philip and Queen Mary, intituled, An Act touching the making of Woollen Cloths. | The whole act. (Note: The whole act was repealed by the City of London Courts of Justice Act 1815 (55 Geo. 3. c. xciii).) |
| 1 Eliz. 1. c. 14 | Woollen Cloths Act 1558 | Another Act made in the First Year of Queen Elizabeth, intituled, An Act for the continuing the making of Woollen Clothes in divers Towns in the County of Essex. | The whole act. |
| 23 Eliz. 1. c. 9 | Dyeing of Cloth Act 1580 | Another Act made in the Twenty- third Year of Queen Elizabeth, intituled, An Act for abolishing of certain deceitful Stuff used in dying of Cloth. &c. | The whole act. |
| 27 Eliz. 1. c. 17 | Cloths Act 1584 | Act made in the Twenty-seventh Year of Queen Elizabeth, intituled, An Act touching the Breadth of White Woollen Clothes made within the Counties of Wilts, Gloucester, Somerset, and Oxon, &c | The whole act. |
| 27 Eliz. 1. c. 18 | Cloths (No. 2) Act 1584 | Another Act made in the Twenty-seventh Year of Queen Elizabeth, intituled, An Act concerning the making of Woollen Clothes in the Counties of Devon and Cornwall, called Plain White Straight and Pinned White Straight. | The whole act. |
| 35 Eliz. 1. c. 9 | Cloths Act 1592 | An Act made in the Thirty- fifth Year of Queen Elizabeth, intituled, An Alt touching the Breadth of Plunkets, Azures and Blues, and other coloured Clothes made within the Counties of Somerset and elsewhere of like making. | The whole act. |
| 35 Eliz. 1. c. 10 | Cloth Act 1592 | Act made in the Thirty-fifth Year of Queen Elizabeth, intituled, An Act for the Reformation of sundry Abuses in Clothes, called Devonshire Kerties or Dozens, according to a Proclamation of the Thirty fourth Year of the Reign of our Sovereign Lady the Queen that now is. | The whole act. |
| 39 Eliz. 1. c. 20 | Cloth Act 1597 | Another Act made in the Thirty-ninth Year of Queen Elizabeth, intituled, An Act against the deceitful stretching and tentering of Northern Cloth. | The whole act. (Note: The whole act was repealed by the City of London Courts of Justice Act 1815 (55 Geo. 3. c. xciii).) |
| 43 Eliz. 1. c. 10 | Woollen Cloth Act 1601 | Another Act passed in the Forty-third Year of Queen Elizabeth, intituled, An Act for the true making and working of Woollen Clothes. | The whole act. |
| 4 Jas. 1. c. 2 | Woollen Cloths Act 1606 | Another Act made in the Fourth Year of King James the First, intituled, An Act for the true making of Woollen Cloth. | The whole act. (Note: The whole act was repealed by the Repeal of Obsolete Statutes Act 1856 (19 & 20 Vict. c. 64).) |
| 21 Jas. 1. c. 12 | Woollen Cloths Act 1623 | Another Act in made the Twenty-first Year of King James the First, intituled. An Act for Continuance of a former Act made in the Fourth Year of the King's Majesty's Reign of England, &c. intituled, An Act for the true making Woollen Cloths, and for some Additions and Alterations in and to the same. (Note: Woollen Cloths Act 1606 (4 Jas. 1. c. 2).) | The whole act. (Note: The whole act was repealed by the Repeal of Obsolete Statutes Act 1856 (19 & 20 Vict. c. 64).) |
| 7 Ann. c. 13 | Woollen Cloth Act 1708 | Another Act made in the Seventh Year of Queen Anne, intituled, An Act for the better ascertaining the Lengths and Breadths of Woollen Cloth made in the County of York. | The whole act. |
| 10 Ann. c. 26 (Note: This is the citation in The Statutes of the Realm.) 10 Ann. c. 16 (Note: This is the citation in The Statutes at Large.) | Woollen Manufacture Act 1711 | Another Act made in the Tenth Year of Queen Anne, intituled, An Act for regulating, improving, and encouraging the Woollen Manufacture of mixt or medley Broad Cloth, and for the better Payment of the Poor employed therein. | The whole act. (Note: The act was repealed again by the Truck Acts Repeal Act 1831 (1 & 2 Will. 4. c. 36).) |
| 1 Geo. 1. St. 2. c. 15 | Woollen Manufacture Act 1714 | Another Act made in the First Year of the Reign of King George the First intituled, An Act to make an Act of the Tenth Year of Her late Majesty, intituled, An Act for regulating, improving, and encouraging of the Woollen Manufacture of mixt or medley Broad Cloth, and for the better Payment of the Poor employed therein, (Note: Woollen Manufacture Act 1711 (10 Ann. c. 26)) more effectual for the Benefit of Trade in general; and also to render more effectual an Act of the Seventh Year of Her said Majesty's Reign, intituled, An Act for the better ascertaining the Lengths and Breadth of Woollen Cloth made in the County of York. (Note: Woollen Cloth Act 1708 (7 Ann. c. 13)) | The whole act. (Note: The whole act was repealed by the City of London Courts of Justice Act 1815 (55 Geo. 3. c. xciii) and the Truck Acts Repeal Act 1831 (1 & 2 Will. 4. c. 36).) |

Section 2 of the act repealed 6 enactments, listed in that section.

| Citation | Short title | Title | Extent of repeal |
|---|---|---|---|
| 27 Edw. 3. Stat. 1 | Cloths | A certain other Act passed in the Twenty-seventh Year of King Edward the Third, Statutes intituled, The Aulnegers Fees for every Cloth fold, Cloths shall be sealed before they be put to Sale, a Subsidy granted to the King of every Cloth fold. | as directs that Cloths shall be sealed before they be put to Sale. |
| 4 Edw. 4. c. 1 | Cloths Act 1464 | A certain other Act made in the Fourth Year of King Edward the Fourth, intituled, The Length and Breadth of Cloths made to be sold, no Cloths wrought beyond Sea shall be brought into England. | As directs that every whole Woollen Cloth, called Broad Cloth, and all Manner of Cloths called Streits, and every Cloth called Kersey, which shall respectively be made and set to Sale shall be of certain specified Lengths and Breadths respectively, with a certain Provision in a Cafe where the Cloth shall exceed the limited Measure, and that every Half Cloth of every of the said Whole Cloths, Streits and Kerseys, shall keep his Measure in Length and Breadth, according to the Rate, Form, and Nature, of his Whole Cloth aforesaid; and that no Person which shall make any Woollen Cloth to sell, shall mingle or put in or upon the fame Cloth, nor the Wool whereof the said Cloth shall be made, any Lambs' Wool, Flock or Cork in any Manner, under the Penalty therein mentioned, except in particular Cases; and that every of the said Cloths and Half Cloths shall perfectly and rightly pursue and follow one Order of Workmanship from one End to the other, without Difference in the weaving, fulling, knotting, or burling; and that certain Seals shall be used and set upon the said Cloths for the Purpose of denoting the Workmanship, Length, Breadth, comparative Size and other distinguishing Qualities for the several Sorts of Cloth, and that Keepers of the said Seals shall be appointed and shall perform certain Duties, and such Keepers and Aulnegers shall be subject to Penalties for Offences therein mentioned; and that Cloth-makers shall pay to Labourers in the said Trade lawful Money for their Wages, and shall deliver Wools to be wrought according to the faithful Delivery and due Weight thereof, under the Penalties therein mentioned, and that every Carder, Spinster, Weaver, Fuller, Sheerman and Dyer, shall duly perform his Duty in his Occupation; and that every Fuller, in his Craft and Occupation of Fulling, rowing, or tayselling, of Cloth, shall exercise and use Taysells and no Cards deceitfully imparing the same Cloth; and the Justices of Peace and certain other Magistrates shall have Power to hear and determine certain Complaints of every such Clothmaker and Labourer, and shall exercise their Jurisdiction in that Behalf in the Manner therein specified, and that such Justices or Magistrates shall have Jurisdiction over Persons offending against that Ordinance, and that such Persons shall be subject to a Forfeiture, and that such Justices or Magistrates shall have certain Powers for exercising their jurisdiction in that Behalf. |
| 5 Eliz. 1. c. 4 | Statute of Artificers 1562 | A certain other Act made in the Fifth Year of Queen intituled An Act containing made divers Orders for Artificers, Labourers, Servants of Husbandry, and Apprentices. | As directs, that no Person shall be detained, hired, or taken into Service to work for any less Time than for One whole Year in any of the Sciences, Crafts, Mysteries, or Arts of Clothiers, Woollen Cloth Weavers, Tuckers, Fullers, Clothworkers, Sheermen, or Dyers of Wool or Woollen Cloth; and that every Person being unmarried, and every other Person being under the Age of Thirty Years, and having been brought up in any of the said Arts, Crafts, or Sciences, or that hath used or exercised any of them by the Space of Three Years or more, and not having Real or Personal Property of a certain specified Value, nor being retained with any Person in Husbandry, or in any of the Arts and Sciences according to that Statute, nor in any other Art or Science, nor in Household, or in any Office with any Nobleman, Gentleman, or others, according to the Laws of this Realm, nor having a convenient Farm or other Holding in Tillage whereupon he may employ his Labour, shall upon Request made by any Person using the Art or Mystery wherein the said Person so required required hath been exercised (as is aforesaid) be retained, and shall not refuse to serve according to the Tenor of that Statute, upon the Pain and Penalty thereafter mentioned; and that no Person dwelling in any City or Town Corporate, using or exercising any of the Mysteries or Crafts of a Clothier, that doth or shall put Cloth to making and Sale, shall take any Apprentice or Servant to be instructed or taught in any of the Arts, Occupations, Crafts, or Mysteries which he doth use or exercise, except such Servant or Apprentice be his Son, or else that the Father and Mother of such Apprentice or Servant shall have Freehold Property of a certain Amount, and that no Person dwelling in any such Market Town, using or exercising the Feat, Mystery, or Art of a Clothier, that doth or shall put Cloth to making and Sale, shall take any Apprentice, or in anywise teach or instruct any Person in the Art, Science, or Mystery last before recited, except such Servant or Apprentice shall be his Son, or else that the Father or Mother of such Apprentice shall have Freehold Property of a certain annual Value; and that no Person shall set up, occupy, use, or exercise any Craft, Mystery, or Occupation then used or occupied within the Realm of England or Wales, except he shall have been brought up therein Seven Years at the least as an Apprentice in Manner and Form in the said last recited Act mentioned, nor shall set any Person on work in such Mystery, Art, or Occupation, except he shall have been Apprentice as is aforesaid, or else having served as an Apprentice shall become a Journeyman, or be hired by the Year, so far only as the said last mentioned Provision respects Persons employed in any of the Crafts, Mysteries, or Occupations of Clothiers, Woollen Cloth Weavers, Tuckers, Fullers, Clothworkers, Sheermen, or Dyers of Wool or Woollen Cloth; and that all Persons that shall have Three Apprentices in any of the said Crafts, Mysteries, or Occupations of a Clothmaker, Fuller, Sheerman, or Weaver, shall retain and keep One Journeyman, and for every other Apprentice above the Number of Three Apprentices One other Journeyman. I.e., sections, 2, 27, 29, 31 and 33. |
| 3 Jas. 1. c. 16 | Kerseys Act 1605 | A certain other Act passed in the Third Year of King | As directs that Kerfies, commonly called Ordinary Kerfies, and that Kerfies called Sorting Kerfies, shall not exceed respectively a certain Length, and shall be respectively of a certain Weight ac- cording to the Length, and if any Kerfies shall either exceed the pre- scribed Length or fall short of the prescribed Weight, then every Person that shall make the same for Sale shall be subject to the Forfeiture therein mentioned, and that every Person selling or trading in any such Kersey shall pay a Custom and Subsidy after a specified Rate. I.e., sections 3 and 4. |
| 13 Geo. 1. c. 23 | Woollen Manufacture Act 1726 | A certain other Act passed in the Thirteenth Year of King George the First, intituled, An Act for the better Regulation of the Woollen Manufacture, and for preventing Disputes among the Persons concerned therein, and for limiting a Time for prosecuting for the Forfeiture appointed by an Act of the Twelfth Year of His Majesty's Reign, in case of Payment of the Workmen's Wages in any other Manner than in Money. | As directs that no Clothier or Maker of Woollen Cloths, Druggets, or other Woollen Goods, or Goods mixed with Wool, shall use any Ends of Yarn, Wefts, or other Refuse of Cloths, Druggets, or other Woollen Goods, or Goods mixed with Wool, (Flocks and Pinions only excepted) by working the fame up again into any Sorts of Goods whatsoever, under a certain Penalty; and that every Owner of Tentor or Tentors, Rack or Racks for such Cloth, within the Counties of Gloucester, Wilts, and Somerset, shall measure such Tentor or Tentor's Rack as shall be made use of for tentering or racking such Cloth, and mark the true Length of Yards of each Tentor or Rack thereon, in the Manner particularly directed by the said last recited Act, and under the Penalty therein mentioned; and that the Justices of the Peace for the Counties aforesaid shall appoint Inspectors, with a certain Salary to each of them, and with certain Duties and Powers particularly pointed out by the said last recited Act; and that any Clothier or Maker of any such Cloth, or any Millman or other Person within the Counties aforesaid, shall incur a Penalty for refusing Entrance to any such Inspector, and that any such Inspector, acting against his Oath shall forfeit twenty Pounds; and that every Maker of mixed or medley Woollen Broad Cloth within the Counties aforesaid, shall pay to the Inspector the Sum of Two-pence per Cloth for every such Cloth he shall make before the Cloths are sent away from the Mill; and the said Inspector shall pay the Money so received into the Hands of the Treasurer of the County, to be applied towards the Salaries of Inspectors to be appointed by virtue of the said last recited Act; and that any Millman within the Counties aforesaid, fending Home to any Clothier or Maker of Cloth, any such Cloth or Cloths as aforesaid, before they are inspected and measured as aforesaid shall for every Piece of Cloth so fent Home forfeit the Sum of Forty Shillings. I.e., sections 10 to 14. |
| 5 Geo. 3. c. 51 | Cloth Manufacture, Yorkshire Act 1765 | A certain other Act passed in the Fifth Year of His present Majesty, intituled, An Act for repealing several Laws relating to the Manufacture of Wollen Cloth in the County of York, and also so much of several other Laws as prescribes particular Standards of Width and Length of such Woollen Cloths, and for substituting other Regulations of the Cloth Trade within the West Riding of the said County, for preventing Frauds in certifying the Contents of the Cloth, and for preserving the Credit of the said Manufacture at the Foreign Market. | As directs that if any Person or Persons within the said West Riding of the said County shall use or cause to be used in dressing of Cloth any Cards made with Wire or with Teeth of Iron or any other Metal whatsoever, every such Person or Persons so using the same shall for every such Offence forfeit Forty Shillings. I.e., section 22. |

Section 3 of the act provided that nothing in the act would invalidate any existing or future apprenticeship contracts in the woollen manufacturing trades for legally permitted periods, though such apprenticeships would not be required as a qualification for working in the woollen industry either as a master or journeyman.

Section 4 of the act provided that nothing in the act should be construed to revive any previously repealed acts or parts of acts, and that all such previously repealed legislation would remain repealed as if the current act had not been made.

Section 5 of the act provided that any persons who had served apprenticeships in the woollen manufacturing trade, as well as their wives and children, could practice their trade or any other trade in any town or place within Great Britain without restriction. It protected them from legal action based on local bylaws or the Statute of Artificers 1562 (5 Eliz. 1. c. 4) restricting trade practices. It further specified that if such persons were prosecuted, they could use their apprenticeship as a defence, and anyone bringing unsuccessful suits against them would be liable for double the normal legal costs.

Section 6 of the act provided that provided that any two or more Justices of the Peace could summon a person (or their wife or child) who was setting up a trade to appear before them and make an oath about their place of legal settlement. The Justices were required to provide an attested copy of this affidavit to the person, which could then be used as evidence of their legal settlement in future proceedings before Justices of the Peace at General or Quarter Sessions.

Section 7 of the act provided that if a person (or their wife or child) was summoned again to make the same oath regarding legal settlement, they could present the attested copy of their previously taken oath instead and would not be required to take another oath, though they must leave a copy of the attested copy if required.

Section 8 of the act provided that that nothing in the act would prejudice the privileges of the Universities of Cambridge and Oxford, nor would it allow anyone to set up as a vintner or sell wine or other liquors within those universities without first obtaining a license from the respective Vice Chancellor.

Section 9 of the act provided that nothing in the act would extend to or affect the city of London, nor would it alter any of the existing laws and customs related to apprentices in that city.

== Subsequent developments ==
The Woollen Manufacture Act 1810 (50 Geo. 3. c. 83), passed in the year following the act, further repealed 4 enactments related to the manufacture of wool in the United Kingdom.

The qualified terms of the repeal led to several acts being repealed by later acts, including:

- City of London Courts of Justice Act 1815 (55 Geo. 3. c. xciii)
- Repeal of Obsolete Statutes Act 1856 (19 & 20 Vict. c. 64)
- Statute Law (Ireland) Revision Act 1872 (35 & 36 Vict. c. 98)

The whole act was repealed by section 1 of, and the schedule to, the Statute Law Revision Act 1872 (No. 2) (35 & 36 Vict. c. 97), which came into force on 10 August 1872.
