= Truck Acts Repeal Act 1831 =

Act of the Parliament of the United Kingdom

- Act of Parliament
- Parliament of the United Kingdom
- Long title: An Act to repeal several Acts and Parts of Acts prohibiting the Payment of Wages in Goods, or otherwise than in the current Coin of the Realm.
- Citation: 1 & 2 Will. 4. c. 36
- Territorial extent: United Kingdom

Dates
- Royal assent: 15 October 1831
- Commencement: 15 October 1831 (Note: The Acts of Parliament (Commencement) Act 1793.)
- Repealed: 16 July 1874
Other legislation
Amends	See § Repealed enactments
Repealed by	Statute Law Revision Act 1874
Relates to	Woollen Manufacture Act 1809; Truck Act 1831; Woollen Trade Act 1833

Status: Repealed

Text of statute as originally enacted

The Truck Acts Repeal Act 1831 (1 & 2 Will. 4. c. 36) was an act of the Parliament of the United Kingdom.

== Background ==
In 1831, the Truck Act 1831 (1 & 2 Will. 4. c. 36) was passed, bringing in a new regime regulating truck systems in the United Kingdom.

== Provisions ==
=== Repealed enactments ===
Section 1 of the act repealed the Cloths Act 1464 (4 Edw. 4. c. 1), the Drapers, etc. (Shrewsbury) Act 1566 (8 Eliz. 1. c. 7), the Partial Repeal of 8 Eliz. 1 c. 7 Act 1572 (14 Eliz. 1. c. 12), Sheriffs Act 1702 (1 Ann. c. 18) (Note: This is the citation in The Statutes of the Realm.), the Coal Trade Act 1710 (9 Ann. c. 32), the Woollen Manufacture Act 1711 (10 Ann. c. 26), the Woollen Manufacture Act 1714 (1 Geo. 1. St. 2. c. 15), the Woollen Manufactures Act 1725 (12 Geo. 1. c. 34), the Woollen Manufacture Act 1726 (13 Geo. 1. c. 23), the Frauds of Workmen Act 1739 (13 Geo. 2. c. 8) the Frauds by Workmen Act 1748 (22 Geo. 2. c. 27), the Woollen Manufacture Act 1756 (29 Geo. 2. c. 33), the Woollen Manufactures Act 1757 (30 Geo. 2. c. 12), the Frauds by Workmen Act 1777 (17 Geo. 3. c. 56), the Payment of Lace Makers' Wages Act 1779 (19 Geo. 3. c. 49), the Payment of Cutters' Wages Act 1817 (57 Geo. 3. c. 115), the Payment of Colliers' Wages Act 1817 (c. 112) and the Payment of Workmen's Wages Act 1818 (58 Geo. 3. c. 51) "as relates or regulates to the Payment of the Wages of Workmen in the several Trades and Occupations therein enumerated in Goods or by way of Truck".

Section 2 of the act provided that the repeals would not affect recovery of wages, prosecution of offences or recovery of penalties under those repealed acts.

== Subsequent developments ==
The whole act was repealed by section 1 of, and the schedule to, the Statute Law Revision Act 1874 (37 & 38 Vict. c. 35), which came into force on 16 July 1874.
