= Woollen Manufacture Act 1810 =

Act of the Parliament of the United Kingdom

- Act of Parliament
- Parliament of the United Kingdom
- Long title: An act to repeal several Acts respecting the Woollen Manufacture, and for indemnifying Persons liable to any Penalty for having acted contrary thereto.
- Citation: 50 Geo. 3. c. 83
- Introduced by: George Rose MP (Commons)
- Territorial extent: United Kingdom

Dates
- Royal assent: 15 June 1810
- Commencement: 15 June 1810 (Note: The Acts of Parliament (Commencement) Act 1793.)
- Repealed: 10 August 1872
Other legislation
Repeals/revokes	Cloths Act 1483; Exportation Act 1513; Exportation Act 1535; Exportation Act 1541
Repealed by	Statute Law Revision Act 1872 (No. 2)
Relates to	Statute of Artificers 1562; Woollen Manufacture Act 1809; City of London Courts of Justice Act 1815; Importation (No. 4) Act 1816; Repeal of Acts Concerning Importation Act 1822; Repeal of Acts Concerning Importation (No. 2) Act 1822; Woollen Trade Act 1833; Repeal of Obsolete Statutes Act 1856; Statute Law Revision Act 1863; Statute Law (Ireland) Revision Act 1872

Status: Repealed

Text of statute as originally enacted

The Woollen Manufacture Act 1810 (50 Geo. 3. c. 83) was an act of the Parliament of the United Kingdom that repealed enactments relating to the manufacture of wool in the United Kingdom. The act deregulated the wool industry, heralding the transition from workshops to mills.

== Background ==
The committee appointed to consider of the state of the woollen manufacture of England reported on 19 May 1808, resolving to repeal various old acts relating to the manufacture of wool in the United Kingdom.

In 1809, the Woollen Manufacture Act 1809 (49 Geo. 3. c. 109) was passed, which repealed almost 40 enactments related to the manufacture of wool in the United Kingdom.

== Passage ==
A petition to repeal various older acts of parliament relating to the manufacture of wool was presented on 26 February 1810. The Cloths Act 1483 (1 Ric. 3. c. 8), the Exportation Act 1513 (5 Hen. 8. c. 3), the Exportation Act 1535 (27 Hen. 8. c. 13) and the Exportation Act 1541 (33 Hen. 8. c. 19) were read and committed to a committee of the whole house on 28 May 1810, which resolved to repeal the acts.

Leave to bring in the Wool Bill to the House of Commons was granted to Davies Giddy MP, the Secretary to the Treasury Richard Wharton MP, William Wilberforce MP, Lord Viscount Milton and the Vice-President of the Board of Trade, George Rose MP on 28 May 1810. The bill had its first reading in the House of Commons on 31 May 1810, presented by the Vice-President of the Board of Trade, George Rose MP. The bill had its second reading in the House of Commons on 1 June 1810 and was committed to a committee of the whole house, which met and reported on 2 May 1810, without amendments. The bill had its third reading in the House of Commons on 5 June 1810 and passed, without amendments.

The bill had its first reading in the House of Lords on 6 June 1810. The bill had its second reading in the House of Lords on 8 June 1810 and was committed to a committee of the whole house, which met and reported on 9 June 1810, without amendments. The bill had its third reading in the House of Lords on 13 June 1810 and passed, without amendments.

The bill was granted royal assent on 15 June 1810.

== Provisions ==
=== Repealed enactments ===
Section 1 of the act repealed 4 enactments, listed in that section, and indemnified any person liable to any penalties under those acts.

Citation	Short title	Title	Extent of repeal
1 Ric. 3. c. 8	Cloths Act 1483	An Act made in the First Year of the Reign of His Majesty King Richard the Third, intituled, The Length and Breadth of Cloths, and the Order of dying them and Wools, the Ability of the Aulneger, and what Cloths he may seal.	The whole act. (Note: This act was already repealed by the Woollen Manufacture Act 1809 (49 Geo. 3. c. 109).)
5 Hen. 8. c. 3	Exportation Act 1513	An Act passed in the Fifth Year of the Reign of His Majesty King Henry the Eighth, intituled, An Act that White Wool and Cloths of Five Marks and under may be carried over the Sea unshorn.	The whole act. (Note: This repeal was confirmed by section 10 of the Repeal of Acts Concerning Importation Act 1822 (3 Geo. 4. c. 41).)
27 Hen. 8. c. 13	Exportation Act 1535	An Act passed in the Twenty seventh. Year of the Reign of His said Majesty King Henry the Eighth, intituled, For Cloths Whites of iv. li. and not above, and coloured Cloths of iii. li. and not above, to be carried over the Sea unbarbed and unshorn.	The whole act. (Note: This repeal was confirmed by section 10 of the Repeal of Acts Concerning Importation Act 1822 (3 Geo. 4. c. 41).)
33 Hen. 8. c. 19	Exportation Act 1541	An Act made in the Thirty third Year of the Reign of His said Majesty King Henry the Eighth, intituled, An Exposition of a certain Statute concerning the shipping of Cloths.	The whole act. (Note: This repeal was confirmed by section 10 of the Repeal of Acts Concerning Importation Act 1822 (3 Geo. 4. c. 41).)

== Subsequent developments ==
The repeals in this act were confirmed by section 10 of the Repeal of Acts Concerning Importation Act 1822 (3 Geo. 4. c. 41).

The whole act was repealed by section 1 of, and the schedule to, the Statute Law Revision Act 1872 (No. 2) (35 & 36 Vict. c. 97), which came into force on 10 August 1872.
