= Statute Law Revision Act 1872 (No. 2) =

Act of the Parliament of the United Kingdom

Statute Law Revision Act 1872 (No. 2) (Note: Section 2.) (Note: The Statute Law Revision (Isle of Man) Act 1991 and the Statute Law (Repeals) Act 1998 refer to 35 & 36 Vict. c. 97 as the Statute Law Revision (No. 2) Act 1872.)
- Act of Parliament
- Parliament of the United Kingdom
- Long title: An Act for promoting the Revision of the Statute Law by repealing certain Enactments which have ceased to be in force or have become unnecessary.
- Citation: 35 & 36 Vict. c. 97
- Introduced by: John Coleridge MP (Commons); William Wood, 1st Baron Hatherley (Lords)
- Territorial extent: United Kingdom

Dates
- Royal assent: 10 August 1872
- Commencement: 10 August 1872 (Note: The Acts of Parliament (Commencement) Act 1793.)
- Repealed: 19 November 1998
Other legislation
Amends	See § Repealed enactments
Repeals/revokes	See § Repealed enactments
Amended by	Statute Law Revision Act 1894; Statute Law Revision (Isle of Man) Act 1991
Repealed by	Statute Law (Repeals) Act 1998
Relates to	Repeal of Obsolete Statutes Act 1856; See Statute Law Revision Act

Status: Repealed

History of passage through Parliament

Records of Parliamentary debate relating to the statute from Hansard

Text of statute as originally enacted

The Statute Law Revision Act 1872 (No. 2) (35 & 36 Vict. c. 97), also known as the Statute Law Revision (No. 2) Act 1872,, was an act of the Parliament of the United Kingdom that repealed for the United Kingdom enactments from 1807 to 1810 which had ceased to be in force or had become necessary. The act was intended, in particular, to facilitate the preparation of the revised edition of the statutes, then in progress.

== Background ==
In the United Kingdom, acts of Parliament remain in force until expressly repealed. Blackstone's Commentaries on the Laws of England, published in the late 18th-century, raised questions about the system and structure of the common law and the poor drafting and disorder of the existing statute book.

From 1810 to 1825, the The Statutes of the Realm was published, providing the first authoritative collection of acts. The first statute law revision act was not passed until 1856 with the Repeal of Obsolete Statutes Act 1856 (19 & 20 Vict. c. 64). This approach — focusing on removing obsolete laws from the statute book followed by consolidation — was proposed by Peter Locke King MP, who had been highly critical of previous commissions' approaches, expenditures, and lack of results.

Previous statute law revision acts
Year passed	Title	Citation	Effect
1861	Statute Law Revision Act 1861	24 & 25 Vict. c. 101	Repealed or amended over 800 enactments
1863	Statute Law Revision Act 1863	26 & 27 Vict. c. 125	Repealed or amended over 1,600 enactments for England and Wales
1867	Statute Law Revision Act 1867	30 & 31 Vict. c. 59	Repealed or amended over 1,380 enactments
1870	Statute Law Revision Act 1870	33 & 34 Vict. c. 69	Repealed or amended over 250 enactments
1871	Promissory Oaths Act 1871	34 & 35 Vict. c. 48	Repealed or amended almost 200 enactments
1871	Statute Law Revision Act 1871	34 & 35 Vict. c. 116	Repealed or amended over 1,060 enactments
1872	Statute Law Revision Act 1872	35 & 36 Vict. c. 63	Repealed or amended almost 490 enactments
1872	Statute Law (Ireland) Revision Act 1872	35 & 36 Vict. c. 98	Repealed or amended over 1,050 enactments

== Passage ==
The Statute Law Revision (No. 2) Bill had its first reading in the House of Lords on 16 July 1872, introduced by the Lord Chancellor, William Wood, 1st Baron Hatherley. The bill had its second reading in the House of Lords on 22 July 1872 and was committed to a committee of the whole house, which met and reported on 23 July 1872, without amendments. The bill had its third reading in the House of Lords on 25 July 1872 and passed, without amendments.

The bill had its first reading in the House of Commons on 1 August 1872, second reading in the House of Commons on 5 August 1872, and was committed to a committee of the whole house, which met and reported on 6 August 1872, without amendments. The bill had its third reading in the House of Commons on 7 August 1872 and passed, without amendments.

The bill was granted royal assent on 10 August 1872.

== Subsequent developments ==
The act intended, in particular, to facilitate the preparation of the revised edition of the statutes then in progress.

The schedule to the act was repealed by section 1 of, and the first schedule to, the Statute Law Revision Act 1894 (57 & 58 Vict. c. 54), which came into force on 25 August 1894.

The enactments which were repealed (whether for the whole or any part of the United Kingdom) by the act were repealed so far as they extended to the Isle of Man by section 1(1) of, and schedule 1 to, the Statute Law Revision (Isle of Man) Act 1991, which came into force on 25 July 1991.

The whole act was repealed by section 1(1) of, and group 1 of part IX of schedule 1 to, the Statute Law (Repeals) Act 1998, which came into force on 19 November 1998.

The act was retained for the Republic of Ireland by section 2(2)(a) of, and part 4 of schedule 1 to, the Statute Law Revision Act 2007, which came into force on 8 May 2007.

== Repealed enactments ==
Section 1 of the act repealed 274 enactments, listed in the schedule to the act, across six categories: (Note: The Note of the bill, unlike the schedule, gives commentary on each act, noting any earlier repeals and the reason for the new repeal.)

- Expired
- Spent
- Repealed in general terms
- Virtually repealed
- Superseded
- Obsolete

Section 1 of the act included several safeguards to ensure that the repeal does not negatively affect existing rights or ongoing legal matters. Specifically, any legal rights, privileges, or remedies already obtained under the repealed laws, as well as any legal proceedings or principles established by them, remain unaffected. Section 1 of the act also ensured that repealed enactments that have been incorporated into other laws would continue to have legal effect in those contexts. Moreover, the repeal would not revive any former rights, offices, or jurisdictions that had already been abolished.

Citation	Short title	Title	Extent of repeal
47 Geo. 3 Sess. 1. c. 2	Loans or Exchequer Bills Act 1807	An Act for raising the Sum of Ten millions five hundred thousand Pounds by Loans or Exchequer Bills, for the Service of Great Britain for the Year One thousand eight hundred and seven.	The whole act.
47 Geo. 3 Sess. 1. c. 3	Duties on Malt Act 1807	An Act for continuing and granting to His Majesty certain Duties upon Malt in Great Britain, for the Service of the Year One thousand eight hundred and seven.	The whole act.
47 Geo. 3 Sess. 1. c. 4	Duties on Pensions, etc. Act 1807	An Act for continuing and granting to His Majesty a Duty on Pensions, Offices, and Personal Estates, in England; and certain Duties on Sugar, Malt, Tobacco, and Snuff, in Great Britain, for the Service of the Year One thousand eight hundred and seven.	The whole act.
47 Geo. 3 Sess. 1. c. 6	Irish Militia Act 1807	An Act the title of which begins with the words,—An Act to continue, during the present War,—and ends with the words,—Militia Forces in Ireland as might voluntarily offer themselves to be employed in Great Britain.	The whole act.
47 Geo. 3 Sess. 1. c. 8	Arms and Gunpowder (Ireland) Act 1807	An Act to continue for the Term of Seven Years certain Acts of the Parliament of Ireland, for preventing the Importation of Arms, Gunpowder, and Ammunition, and the making, removing, selling, and keeping of Gunpowder, Arms, and Ammunition, without Licence.	The whole act.
47 Geo. 3 Sess. 1. c. 10	Treasury Bills (Ireland) Act 1807	An Act for raising the Sum of One million by Treasury Bills for the Service of Ireland for the Year One thousand eight hundred and seven.	The whole act.
47 Geo. 3 Sess. 1. c. 11	Cape of Good Hope Trade Act 1807	An Act to authorize His Majesty, until the Twenty-fifth day of March One thousand eight hundred and eight, to make Regulations respecting the Trade and Commerce to and from the Cape of Good Hope.	The whole act.
47 Geo. 3 Sess. 1. c. 13	Accounts, etc., of Barrack Master General Act 1807	An Act for investing certain Commissioners appointed for the Examination of Accounts and Expenditure relating to the Office of Barrack Master General, with certain Powers and Authorities necessary for the Examination of such Accounts and Expenditure.	The whole act.
47 Geo. 3 Sess. 1. c. 14	Controverted Elections (Ireland) Act 1807	An Act to amend several Acts, for regulating the Trial of Controverted Elections or Returns of Members to serve in Parliament, so far as the same relate to Ireland.	The whole act.
47 Geo. 3 Sess. 1. c. 15	Army and Navy Act 1807	An Act to continue for the Term of Seven Years, certain Acts for the better Prevention and Punishment of Attempts to seduce Persons serving in His Majesty's Forces by Sea or Land from their Duty and Allegiance to His Majesty, or to incite them to Mutiny or Disobedience.	The whole act.
47 Geo. 3 Sess. 1. c. 18	Excise Duties and Taxes (Ireland) Act 1807	An Act to grant to His Majesty certain Inland Duties of Excise and Taxes in Ireland, and to allow certain Drawbacks in respect thereof; in lieu of former Duties of Excise, Taxes, and Drawbacks.	The whole act.
47 Geo. 3 Sess. 1. c. 20	Drawbacks Act 1807	An Act to suspend, until the First Day of May One thousand eight hundred and seven, the Payment of all Drawbacks on Spirits made or distilled in Great Britain or Ireland, and exported from either Country to the other respectively.	The whole act.
47 Geo. 3 Sess. 1. c. 23	South Sea Company Act 1807	An Act the title of which begins with the words,—An Act for repealing so much of an Act, made in the Ninth Year,—and ends with the words,— Possession of His Majesty, His Heirs or Successors.	The whole act.
47 Geo. 3 Sess. 1. c. 24.	Importation Act 1807	An Act for allowing, until the First Day of August One thousand eight hundred and eight, the Importation of certain Fish from Newfoundland and the Coast of Labrador, and for granting a Bounty thereon.	The whole act.
47 Geo. 3 Sess. 1. c. 27.	Excise Act 1807	An Act for granting to His Majesty, until Twelve Months after the Ratification of a Definitive Treaty of Peace, certain additional Duties of Excise on Brandy in Great Britain.	The whole act.
47 Geo. 3 Sess. 1. c. 29.	Bounties (Great Britain) Act 1807	An Act the title of which begins with the words,—An Act for further continuing, until the Twenty-fifth Day of March,—and ends with the words,—Bounties on Sugar when the Duties imposed by an Act of the last Session of Parliament shall be suspended.	The whole act.
47 Geo. 3 Sess. 1. c. 30.	Exportation Act (No. 2) 1807	An Act the title of which begins with the words,—An Act to continue, until the Twenty-fifth Day of March,—and ends with the words,—Ships belonging to the Inhabitants of the United States of America, and coming in Ballast.	The whole act.
47 Geo. 3 Sess. 1. c. 31.	Importation (Ireland) Act 1807	An Act to repeal Part of the Duty on the Importation of unmanufactured Tobacco into Ireland.	The whole act.
47 Geo. 3 Sess. 1. c. 32.	Mutiny Act 1807	An Act for punishing Mutiny and Desertion; and for the better Payment of the Army and their Quarters.	The whole act.
47 Geo. 3 Sess. 1. c. 33.	Marine Mutiny Act 1807	An Act for the Regulation of His Majesty's Royal Marine Forces while on Shore.	The whole act.
47 Geo. 3 Sess. 1. c. 34.	Bringing of Coals, etc., to London Act 1807	An Act the title of which begins with the words,—An Act for continuing, until the First Day of August,—and ends with the words,—Coals, Culm, or Cinders, to London and Westminster, by Inland Navigation.	The whole act.
47 Geo. 3 Sess. 1. c. 37.	Depredations on the Thames Act 1807	An Act the title of which begins with the words,—An Act to continue, until the Twenty-fifth Day of March,—and ends with the words,—Frauds by Persons navigating Bumboats, and other Boats, upon the River Thames.	The whole act.
47 Geo. 3 Sess. 1. c. 39.	Annuities to Branches of Royal Family Act 1807	An Act to rectify a mistake in an Act made in the last Session of Parliament, to enable His Majesty to settle Annuities on certain Branches of the Royal Family.	The whole act.
47 Geo. 3 Sess. 1. c. 41.	Fees, etc., in Public Offices (Ireland) Act 1807	An Act the title of which begins with the words,—An Act to continue, until the Twenty-fifth Day of March,—and ends with the words,—Accounting for Publick Money, in Ireland.	The whole act.
47 Geo. 3 Sess. 1. c. 42.	Lighting, etc., of Cities (Ireland) Act 1807	An Act to continue for Twenty-one Years, so much of certain Acts of the Parliament of Ireland, as relate to the lighting, cleansing, and watching of Cities and Towns, for the lighting, cleansing, and watching of which no particular Provision is made by any Act of Parliament.	The whole act.
47 Geo. 3 Sess. 1. c. 44.	Hospitals (Ireland) Act 1807	An Act to amend an Act made in the last Session of Parliament, for regulating and providing for the Relief of the Poor and the Management of Infirmaries and Hospitals in Ireland.	The whole act.
47 Geo. 3 Sess. 1. c. 45.	Collieries (Ireland) Act 1807	An Act to continue an Act made in the Parliament of Ireland, in the Thirty-first Year of the Reign of His late Majesty King George the Second, for the better supplying the City of Dublin with Coals, and for the better Encouragement of the Collieries of Ireland.	The whole act.
47 Geo. 3 Sess. 1. c. 53.	Regrating and Ingrossing of Oaken Bark Act 1807	An Act to amend an Act made in the Second Year of King James the First, intituled An Act concerning Tanners, Curriers, Shoemakers, and other Artificers, occupying the cutting of Leather, as prohibits the tanning and dressing of Ox Bark.	The whole act.
47 Geo. 3 Sess. 1. c. 54.	Quartering of Soldiers Act 1807	An Act for increasing the Rates of Subsistence to be paid to Innkeepers and others on quartering Soldiers.	The whole act.
47 Geo. 3 Sess. 2. c. 1	Importation and Exportation (Ireland) Act 1807	An Act to continue until the Fifth Day of July One thousand eight hundred and eight, certain Acts for granting certain Rates and Duties, and for allowing certain Drawbacks and Bounties on Goods, Wares, and Merchandise, imported into and exported from Ireland.	The whole act.
47 Geo. 3 Sess. 2. c. 2	Treaty of Commerce, etc., with America Act 1807	An Act the title of which begins with the words,—An Act to revive and continue, until the Expiration of Six Weeks,—and ends with the words,— and Acts, for such Period as His Majesty may deem expedient.	The whole act.
47 Geo. 3 Sess. 2. c. 3	Indemnity (No. 2) Act 1807	An Act to indemnify Persons who have advised or acted under an Order of Council for regulating Regulations with respect to the Navigation and Commerce between His Majesty's Subjects and the Subjects of the United States of America.	The whole act.
47 Geo. 3 Sess. 2. c. 4	Annuity to Major-General Sir John Stuart Act 1807	An Act to enable His Majesty to grant a certain Annuity to Major General Sir John Stuart, Knight of the most Honourable Order of the Bath, in consideration of the eminent Services which he has rendered to His Majesty and the Publick.	The whole act.
47 Geo. 3 Sess. 2. c. 6	Loans or Exchequer Bills (No. 2) Act 1807	An Act for raising the Sum of Three Millions by Loans or Exchequer Bills, for the Service of Great Britain for the Year One thousand eight hundred and seven.	The whole act.
47 Geo. 3 Sess. 2. c. 7	Loans or Exchequer Bills (No. 3) Act 1807	An Act for raising the Sum of One million five hundred thousand Pounds, by Loans or Exchequer Bills, for the Service of Great Britain for the Year One thousand eight hundred and seven.	The whole act.
47 Geo. 3 Sess. 2. c. 9	Lotteries Act 1807	An Act for granting to His Majesty a Sum of Money to be raised by Lotteries.	The whole act.
47 Geo. 3 Sess. 2. c. 15	Plate Assay (Ireland) Act 1807	An Act to provide for the regulating and securing the Collection of the Duty on Gold and Silver Plate, wrought or manufactured in Ireland.	Sections One, Two, and Twelve.
47 Geo. 3 Sess. 2. c. 18	Countervailing Duties (Ireland) Act 1807	An Act to provide for the Decrease and Suspension, in Certain Cases, of Part of the Countervailing Duties on British Refined Sugar imported into Ireland.	The whole act.
47 Geo. 3 Sess. 2. c. 21	Annuities (Ireland) Act 1807	An Act to continue, until the Twenty-ninth Day of September One thousand eight hundred and seventeen, an Act, passed in Ireland in the Thirteenth and Fourteenth Years of His present Majesty, respecting certain Annuities.	The whole act.
47 Geo. 3 Sess. 2. c. 22	Fisheries (Ireland) Act 1807	An Act to continue, until the Twenty-ninth Day of September One thousand eight hundred and seventeen, an Act, passed in Ireland in the Thirty-sixth Year of His present Majesty, for the Improvement and Extension of the Fisheries on the Coasts of Ireland.	The whole act.
47 Geo. 3 Sess. 2. c. 24	Crown Lands, Escheats Act 1807	An Act the title of which begins with the words,—An Act to explain and amend an Act, passed in the Thirty-ninth and Fortieth Year,—and ends with the words,—Property of His Majesty, and of the Queen Consort for the Time being.	The whole act.
47 Geo. 3 Sess. 2. c. 25	Half-pay and Pensions Act 1807	An Act for the more convenient Payment of Half Pay and Pensions, and other Allowances to Officers and Widows of Officers, and to Persons upon the Compassionate List	Section One from "under such Rules and Regulations" to "applicable, or".
47 Geo. 3 Sess. 2. c. 26	Militia Pay, etc. (Ireland) Act 1807	An Act the title of which begins with the words,—An Act for defraying, until the Twenty-fifth Day of March,—and ends with the words,—Allowances in certain Cases to Subaltern Officers of the said Militia during Peace.	The whole act.
47 Geo. 3 Sess. 2. c. 28	Exchequer Bills Act 1807	An Act to enable the Lords Commissioners of His Majesty's Treasury to issue Exchequer Bills, on the Credit of such Aids or Supplies as have been or shall be granted by Parliament for the Service of Great Britain, for the Year One thousand eight hundred and seven.	The whole act.
47 Geo. 3 Sess. 2. c. 29	Militia Pay (Great Britain) Act 1807	An Act for defraying the Charge of the Pay and Cloathing of the Militia in Great Britain for the Year One thousand eight hundred and seven.	The whole act.
47 Geo. 3 Sess. 2. c. 31	Militia Allowances Act 1807	An Act the title of which begins with the words,—An Act to revive and continue, until the Twenty-fifth Day of March,—and ends with the words,— Militia of England, disembodied under an Act of this present Session of Parliament.	The whole act.
47 Geo. 3 Sess. 2. c. 32	Militia Allowances (No. 2) Act 1807	An Act for making Allowances in certain Cases to Subaltern Officers of the Militia in Great Britain, while disembodied.	The whole act.
47 Geo. 3 Sess. 2. c. 33	Inquiry into Military Departments Act 1807	An Act to continue, until the First Day of June One thousand eight hundred and eight, an Act of the Forty-fifth Year of His present Majesty, for appointing Commissioners to enquire into the Public Expenditure, and the Conduct of the Public Business in the Military Departments therein mentioned.	The whole act.
47 Geo. 3 Sess. 2. c. 37	Excise (No. 2) Act 1807	An Act to revive and continue, until the Twenty-fifth Day of March One thousand eight hundred and eight, an Act of the Forty-sixth Year of His present Majesty, for altering and amending several Laws relating to the Duties of Excise upon Malt.	The whole act.
47 Geo. 3 Sess. 2. c. 38	Trade Act 1807	An Act the title of which begins with the words,—An Act for permitting, until the Twenty-fifth Day of March,—and ends with the words,—Exportation of other enumerated Articles from the same Colonies, to the said States.	The whole act.
47 Geo. 3 Sess. 2. c. 40	Practice in Court of Chancery Act 1807	An Act to alter the Practice of Courts of Equity, in Suits in which Members of Parliament are Defendants.	The whole act.
47 Geo. 3 Sess. 2. c. 43	Woollen Manufacture Act 1807	An Act to revive and continue, until the End of the next Session of Parliament, an Act of the Forty-sixth Year of His present Majesty, for suspending Proceedings in Actions and other Proceedings relating to the Woollen Manufacture.	The whole act.
47 Geo. 3 Sess. 2. c. 44	Sierra Leone Company Act 1807	An Act for transferring to His Majesty, certain Possessions and Rights vested in the Sierra Leone Company, and for shortening the Duration of the said Company, and for preventing any dealing or trafficking in the buying or selling of Slaves within the Colony of Sierra Leone.	The whole act.
47 Geo. 3 Sess. 2. c. 46	Windsor Forest Boundary Commission Act 1807	An Act the title of which begins with the words,—An Act to amend the Provisions of an Act, passed in the Forty-sixth Year,—and ends with the words,—Leases of the Crown within the same; and to amend the said Act.	The whole act.
47 Geo. 3 Sess. 2. c. 47	Duties on Calicoes, etc. Act 1807	An Act the title of which begins with the words,—An Act to grant certain Duties on Calicoes,—and ends with the words,—Regulations contained in the Acts for the Union of Great Britain and Ireland.	The whole act.
47 Geo. 3 Sess. 2. c. 48	Customs and Excise (Ireland) Act 1807	An Act to continue, until the Twenty-ninth Day of September One thousand eight hundred and eight, several Acts for the better Collection and Security of the Revenues of Customs and Excise in Ireland, and for preventing Frauds therein.	The whole act.
47 Geo. 3 Sess. 2. c. 49	Drawback Act 1807	An Act for allowing a Drawback on certain Linens exported from Great Britain to the West Indies.	The whole act.
47 Geo. 3 Sess. 2. c. 50	County Infirmaries (Ireland) Act 1807	An Act to amend an Act, made in the Parliament of Ireland, in the Fifth Year of His present Majesty's Reign, for erecting and establishing Publick Infirmaries or Hospitals in Ireland	Section One from " Purposes of this Act; and" to "the residue of Section Two." Section One from "and that the Grand Jury" to "empowered to". Section Five. Section Six from "or alter" to "not to." Section Seven.
47 Geo. 3 Sess. 2. c. 52	Duty on Coffee, etc., Warehoused Act 1807	An Act to repeal so much of an Act of the last Session of Parliament, as relates to the Payment of Duty on Coffee and Cocoa Nuts when exported from the Warehouse in which the same shall have been secured.	The whole act.
47 Geo. 3 Sess. 2. c. 55	Militia (Ireland) Act 1807	An Act for allowing a certain Proportion of the Militia in Ireland voluntarily to enlist into His Majesty's Regular Forces.	The whole act.
47 Geo. 3 Sess. 2. c. 57	Militia (Great Britain) Act 1807	An Act for allowing a Proportion of the Militia in Great Britain voluntarily to enlist into His Majesty's Regular Forces.	The whole act.
47 Geo. 3 Sess. 2. c. 62	Drawbacks (No. 2) Act 1807	An Act to suspend, until the First Day of May One thousand eight hundred and eight, the Payment of all Drawbacks on Spirits made or distilled in Great Britain or Ireland, and exported from either Country to the other respectively.	The whole act.
47 Geo. 3 Sess. 2. c. 68	India Government, etc. Act 1807	An Act the title of which begins with the words,—An Act for the better Government of the Settlements of Fort Saint George and Bombay,—and ends with the words,—Civil Servants of the East India Company may be employed in their Service abroad	Sections One to Three, Six, and Seven. Repealed as to all Her Majesty's Dominions.
47 Geo. 3 Sess. 2. c. 72	Treasury Bills (Ireland) (No. 2) Act 1807	An Act for raising the Sum of Five hundred thousand Pounds by Treasury Bills for the Service of Ireland for the Year One thousand eight hundred and seven.	The whole act.
47 Geo. 3 Sess. 2. c. 73	Loans or Exchequer Bills (No. 4) Act 1807	An Act for enabling His Majesty to raise the Sum of Four millions five hundred thousand Pounds, for the Service of Great Britain.	The whole act.
47 Geo. 3 Sess. 2. c. 76	Appropriation Act 1807	An Act the title of which begins with the words,—An Act for granting to His Majesty a certain Sum of Money out of the Consolidated Fund,— and ends with the words,—appropriating the Supplies granted in this Session of Parliament.	The whole act.
48 Geo. 3. c. 5	Benefices Act 1808	An Act the title of which begins with the words,—An Act for repealing an Act made in the Forty-seventh Year,—and ends with the words,—Avoidance of Benefices by the Incumbents thereof having accepted augmented Curacies.	The whole act.
48 Geo. 3. c. 6	Treaty of Commerce, etc., with America Act 1808	An Act to continue, until the End of this Session of Parliament, several Acts for carrying into execution the Treaty of Amity, Commerce, and Navigation, between His Majesty and the United States of America.	The whole act.
48 Geo. 3. c. 7	Exchequer Bills Act 1808	An Act for raising the Sum of Ten millions five hundred thousand Pounds, by Exchequer Bills, for the Service of Great Britain for the Year One thousand eight hundred and eight.	The whole act.
48 Geo. 3. c. 10	Distillation of Spirits (Scotland) Act 1808	An Act to amend so much of an Act, made in the Forty-sixth Year of His present Majesty, for granting certain Duties on Spirits made in Scotland, as relates to delivering up the Licenses granted for distilling Spirits in the Lowlands of Scotland, and for better preventing private Distillation.	The whole act.
48 Geo. 3. c. 13	Annuity to Viscount Lake, etc. Act 1808	An Act for settling and securing a certain Annuity on Viscount Lake, and the Two next Persons to whom the Title of Viscount Lake shall descend, in consideration of the eminent Services of the late General Viscount Lake.	The whole act.
48 Geo. 3. c. 14	Marine Mutiny Act 1808	An Act for the Regulation of His Majesty's Royal Marine Forces while on Shore.	The whole act.
48 Geo. 3. c. 15	Mutiny Act 1808	An Act for punishing Mutiny and Desertion; and for the better Payment of the Army and their Quarters.	The whole act.
48 Geo. 3. c. 16	Bounties and Drawbacks Act 1808	An Act the title of which begins with the words,—An Act for further continuing, until the Twenty-fifth Day of March,—and ends with the words, —Duties imposed by an Act of the last Session of Parliament shall be suspended.	The whole act.
48 Geo. 3. c. 17	Bounties and Drawbacks (No. 2) Act 1808	An Act the title of which begins with the words,—An Act to continue, until the Twenty-fifth Day of March,—and ends with the words,—warehousing British Rum or Spirits of the British Sugar Plantations.	The whole act.
48 Geo. 3. c. 18	Duties on Cinnamon, etc. Act 1808	An Act for amending and further continuing an Act made in the Thirty-eighth Year of His present Majesty, for regulating the Payment of the Duties on Cinnamon, Cloves, Nutmegs, and Mace.	The whole act.
48 Geo. 3. c. 19	Importation (No. 2) Act 1808	An Act the title of which begins with the words,—An Act to continue, until the Twenty-fifth Day of March,—and ends with the words,—Timber, for Naval Purposes, from the British Colonies in North America Duty free.	The whole act.
48 Geo. 3. c. 20	Greenland Whale Fisheries, etc. Act 1808	An Act the title of which begins with the words,—An Act to continue until the Twenty-fifth Day of March,—and ends with the words,—Importation of Fish from Newfoundland and the Coast of Labrador.	The whole act.
48 Geo. 3. c. 21	Investment of Certain Money Act 1808	An Act to empower the Commissioners appointed for distributing the Money paid by the United States of America, to withdraw the same from the Bank, and invest it in Exchequer Bills.	The whole act.
48 Geo. 3. c. 23	Importation (No. 3) Act 1808	An Act the title of which begins with the words,—An Act to continue several Laws relating to the granting a Bounty on the Importation into Great Britain of Hemp,—and ends with the words,—First, until the Twenty-fifth Day of March One thousand eight hundred and eleven.	The whole act.
48 Geo. 3. c. 24	Importation (No. 4) Act 1808	An Act for further continuing, until Three Months after the Ratification of a Definitive Treaty of Peace, an Act made in the Forty-fourth Year of His present Majesty, for permitting the Importation into Great Britain, of Hides and other Articles in Foreign Ships.	The whole act.
48 Geo. 3. c. 25	Payment of Creditors (Scotland) Act 1808	An Act for further continuing until the Twenty-fifth Day of July One thousand eight hundred and nine, an Act made in the Thirty-third Year of His present Majesty, for rendering the Payment of Creditors more equal and expeditious in Scotland.	The whole act.
48 Geo. 3. c. 26	Customs (No. 2) Act 1808	An Act for granting to His Majesty, until the End of the next Session of Parliament, certain Duties on Goods, Wares, and Merchandize therein enumerated, in furtherance of the Provisions of certain Orders in Council.	The whole act.
48 Geo. 3. c. 27	Exportation and Importation Act 1808	An Act the title of which begins with the words,—An Act to continue until the Twenty-fifth Day of March,—and ends with the words,—Importation into Ireland, Duty free, of Corn and other Provisions.	The whole act.
48 Geo. 3. c. 28	Customs (No. 3) Act 1808	An Act for granting to His Majesty, until the End of the next Session of Parliament, certain Duties on the Exportation from Ireland of Goods, Wares, and Merchandise therein enumerated.	The whole act.
48 Geo. 3. c. 29	Exportation Act 1808	An Act to prohibit, until the End of the next Session of Parliament, the Exportation of Jesuits Bark and Cotton Wool from Ireland.	The whole act.
48 Geo. 3. c. 33	Exportation (No. 2) Act 1808	An Act to prohibit, until the End of the next Session of Parliament, the Exportation of Jesuits Bark from Great Britain.	The whole act.
48 Geo. 3. c. 34	Exportation (No. 3) Act 1808	An Act to prohibit, until the End of the next Session of Parliament, the Exportation of Cotton Wool from Great Britain.	The whole act.
48 Geo. 3. c. 35	Exportation (No. 4) Act 1808	An Act for imposing, until the End of the next Session of Parliament, a Duty on Cotton Wool, the Growth of the British Colonies, exported from Great Britain.	The whole act.
48 Geo. 3. c. 36	Malt Duties Act 1808	An Act for further continuing, until the Twenty-fourth Day of June One thousand eight hundred and nine, an Act of the Forty-sixth Year of His present Majesty, for altering and amending several Laws relating to the Duties of Excise upon Malt.	The whole act.
48 Geo. 3. c. 37	Validity of Certain Orders in Council, etc. Act 1808	An Act the title of which begins with the words,—An Act for making valid certain Orders respecting,—and ends with the words,—Goods from Countries from which the British Flag is excluded, in any Vessels whatever.	The whole act.
48 Geo. 3. c. 39	Quartering of Soldiers Act 1808	An Act for increasing the Rates of Subsistence to be paid to Innkeepers and others on quartering Soldiers.	The whole act.
48 Geo. 3. c. 43	Drawbacks Act 1808	An Act to suspend until the Eleventh Day of June One thousand eight hundred and eight, the Payment of all Drawbacks on Spirits made or distilled in Great Britain or Ireland, and exported from either Country to the other respectively.	The whole act.
48 Geo. 3. c. 45	Militia Pay (Ireland) Act 1808	An Act the title of which begins with the words,—An Act for defraying until the Twenty-fifth Day of March,—and ends with the words,—Allowances in certain Cases to Subaltern Officers of the Militia during Peace.	The whole act.
48 Geo. 3. c. 46	Militia Pay (Great Britain) Act 1808	An Act for defraying the Charge of the Pay and Cloathing of the Militia in Great Britain for the Year One thousand eight hundred and eight.	The whole act.
48 Geo. 3. c. 49	Accounts of Paymaster General Act 1808	An Act for accelerating the making up, Examination, and Audit of the Accounts of the Paymaster General of His Majesty's Forces.	The whole act.
48 Geo. 3. c. 50	Grants of Offices in Reversion, etc. Act 1808	An Act to suspend the granting of Offices in Reversion, or for joint Lives with Benefit of Survivorship, for One Year from the passing of this Act, and from thence until Six Weeks after the Commencement of the then next Session of Parliament.	The whole act.
48 Geo. 3. c. 51	Militia Allowances Act 1808	An Act for making Allowances in certain Cases to Subaltern Officers of the Militia in Great Britain, while disembodied.	The whole act.
48 Geo. 3. c. 52	Militia Allowances (No. 2) Act 1808	An Act the title of which begins with the words,—An Act to revive and continue, until the Twenty-fifth Day of March,—and ends with the words,— Militia of England, disembodied under an Act of the same Session of Parliament.	The whole act.
48 Geo. 3. c. 53	Exchequer Bills (No. 2) Act 1808	An Act for raising the Sum of Three Millions by Exchequer Bills, for the Service of Great Britain for the Year One thousand eight hundred and eight.	The whole act.
48 Geo. 3. c. 54	Exchequer Bills (No. 3) Act 1808	An Act for raising the Sum of One million five hundred thousand Pounds by Exchequer Bills, for the Service of Great Britain for the Year One thousand eight hundred and eight.	The whole act.
48 Geo. 3. c. 55	House Tax Act 1808	An Act the title of which begins with the words,—An Act, amending the Duties of Assessed Taxes,—and ends with the words,—Management of the Commissioners for the Affairs of Taxes.	Sections One to Six. Section Seven, so far as it relates to Schedule (L.). Sections Eight to Ten. Schedule (A.) except Rule V. so far as the same is applicable to Rule I. of Schedule (B.). Schedule (B.) from "For every such" to "0 2 0 10", the words in Rule I. "and in Addition to the Duties contained in Schedule (A.)" and Cases II. and III. of Exemptions. Schedules (C.) to (N.).
48 Geo. 3. c. 58	Bail Bonds Act 1808	An Act the title of which begins with the words,—An Act for amending the Law with regard to the Course of Proceeding on Indictments,—and ends with the words,—taking Bail in the King's Suit to assign the Bail Bond to the King.	Section Two. Section Three from "or out of any" to "Wales," and from "provided" to "commenced thereupon".
48 Geo. 3. c. 59	Annuity to Duchess of Brunswick Wolfenbuttel Act 1808	An Act for enabling His Majesty to settle an Annuity on Her Royal Highness the Duchess of Brunswick Wolfenbuttel.	The whole act.
48 Geo. 3. c. 60	Tanners, Curriers, Shoemakers, etc. Act 1808	An Act for repealing an Act passed in the First Year of King James the First, intituled An Act concerning Tanners, Curriers, Shoemakers, and other Artificers occupying the cutting of Leather; and also for repealing and amending certain parts of several other Acts of Parliament relating thereto.	The whole act.
48 Geo. 3. c. 61	Inquiry into Military Departments Act 1808	An Act to continue until the End of the next Session of Parliament, an Act of the Forty-fifth Year of His present Majesty, for appointing Commissioners to enquire into the Public Expenditure and the Conduct of the Public Business in the Military Departments therein mentioned.	The whole act.
48 Geo. 3. c. 67	Customs (No. 6) Act 1808	An Act for granting an additional Duty on Hops imported into Great Britain, until the Fifth Day of April One thousand eight hundred and eleven, and from thence to the End of the then next Session of Parlia-	The whole act.
48 Geo. 3. c. 69	Exportation Act 1808	An Act the title of which begins with the words,—An Act to permit, until the Twenty-fifth Day of March,—and ends with the words,—Corn to be imported from such Port and from the Coast of Africa into the said Colonies and Plantations.	The whole act.
48 Geo. 3. c. 71	Amendment of cc 26, 28 of this Session Act 1808	An Act the title of which begins with the words,—An Act to amend so much of Two Acts of this Session,—and ends with the words,—Prize Goods imported into Great Britain or Ireland.	The whole act.
48 Geo. 3. c. 75	Burial of Drowned Persons Act 1808	An Act for providing suitable Interment in Church-yards or Parochial Burying Grounds in England, for such dead Human Bodies as may be cast on Shore from the Sea, in cases of Wreck or otherwise.	The last Section.
48 Geo. 3. c. 79	Malt Duties (Ireland) Act 1808	An Act to amend the Two Acts for the collecting of the Malt Duties in Ireland, and regulating the Trade of a Maltster.	The whole act.
48 Geo. 3. c. 80	Customs (Ireland) Act 1808	An Act the title of which begins with the words,—An Act to continue until the Fifth Day of July,—and ends with the words,—Duty on British Plantation Coffee imported.	The whole act.
48 Geo. 3. c. 85	Trade with America Act 1808	An Act to regulate the Trade between Great Britain and the United States of America until the end of the next Session of Parliament.	The whole act.
48 Geo. 3. c. 88	Bill of Exchange Act 1808	An Act to restrain the Negotiation of Promissory Notes and Inland Bills of Exchange, under a limited Sum, in England	Sections One and Eleven.
48 Geo. 3. c. 89	Accounts of Barrack Office Act 1808	An Act for enabling the Commissioners appointed to examine Accounts of Public Expenditure in the Barrack Office, more speedily and effectually to investigate the said Accounts.	The whole act.
48 Geo. 3. c. 92	Management of Stock Redeemed Act 1808	An Act the title of which begins with the words,—An Act to repeal so much of an Act, made in the Forty-seventh Year,—and ends with the words,— Charges of Management of Stock redeemed.	The whole act.
48 Geo. 3. c. 94	Shooting Hares (Scotland) Act 1808	An Act for repealing so much of an Act made in the Parliament of Scotland, in the Fourth Session of the First Parliament of Queen Anne, intituled, Act for Preserving the Game, as relates to the Shooting of Hares.	The whole act.
48 Geo. 3. c. 97	Exchequer Bills (No. 4) Act 1808	An Act to enable the Commissioners of His Majesty's Treasury, to issue Exchequer Bills, on the Credit of such Aids or Supplies as have been or shall be granted by Parliament for the Service of Great Britain for the Year One thousand eight hundred and eight.	The whole act.
48 Geo. 3. c. 98	Post Horse Duties Act 1808	An Act for letting to Farm the Duties on Horses hired by the Mile or Stage, to be used in travelling, and on Horses hired for a less Period of Time than Twenty-eight Days, for drawing Carriages used in travelling Post, or otherwise, in Great Britain, and for better securing the said Duties.	The whole act.
48 Geo. 3. c. 102	Land Tax Act 1808	An Act the title of which begins with the words,—An Act for enabling Commissioners for carrying into execution an Act of this Session of Parliament,—and ends with the words,—Service of the Year One thousand seven hundred and ninety-eight.	The whole act.
48 Geo. 3. c. 103	Bank of Ireland Act 1808	An Act the title of which begins with the words,—An Act for further extending the Provisions of several Acts for establishing the Bank of Ireland,—and ends with the words,—Service of the Year One thousand eight hundred and eight -	Section One from "That so much" to "repealed;" and", from "and shall for ever" to "also mentioned;" and from "Subject nevertheless" to end of that Section. Section Three to "One thousand eight hundred and nine; and". Sections Five and Six. Section Eight to end of Act.
48 Geo. 3. c. 105	Cape of Good Hope Trade Act 1808	An Act to authorize His Majesty until the Twenty-fifth day of March One thousand eight hundred and nine, to make Regulations respecting the Trade and Commerce to and from the Cape of Good Hope.	The whole act.
48 Geo. 3. c. 108	Compensation to Patentee Officers (Ireland) Act 1808	An Act the title of which begins with the words,—An Act for carrying into complete Execution and Effect certain Provisions,—and ends with the words,—Patentee Officers of the Office of Serjeant at Arms of the said Court of Exchequer.	The whole act.
48 Geo. 3. c. 110	Herring Fishery (Scotland) Act 1808	An Act for the further Encouragement and better Regulation of the British White Herring Fishery, until the First Day of June One thousand eight hundred and thirteen, and from thence to the End of the then next Session of Parliament	Section Thirty-six from "or of" to "net Fish". Section Thirty-eight from "or any Herrings (other than" to "Two hundred Pounds Weight," and from "And if" to end of that Section. Section Thirty-nine. Section Forty from "all" to "such Certificate". Section Forty-one from "Provided" to end of that Section.
48 Geo. 3. c. 112	Treasury Bills (Ireland) Act 1808	An Act for raising the Sum of Five hundred thousand Pounds by Treasury Bills for the Service of Ireland for the Year One thousand eight hundred and eight.	The whole act.
48 Geo. 3. c. 114	Exchequer Bills (No. 5) Act 1808	An Act for raising the Sum of Six Millions by Exchequer Bills, for the Service of Great Britain for the Year One thousand eight hundred and eight.	The whole act.
48 Geo. 3. c. 115	Duties on Spirits Act 1808	An Act to grant to His Majesty Countervailing Duties on Spirits imported into Ireland from Scotland; and to allow equivalent Drawbacks on Spirits exported from Ireland to Scotland.	The whole act.
48 Geo. 3. c. 118	Distillation of Spirits Act 1808	An Act to prohibit the Distillation of Spirits from Corn or Grain, for a limited Time.	The whole act.
48 Geo. 3. c. 126	Removal of Goods for Exportation, etc. Act 1808	An Act the title of which begins with the words,—An Act to permit Goods secured in Warehouses in the Port of London,—and ends with the words —One Month after the Signature of the Preliminary Articles of Peace.	The whole act.
48 Geo. 3. c. 128	Regimental Accounts Act 1808	An Act the title of which begins with the words,—An Act to repeal so much of an Act, passed in the Forty-fifth Year,—and ends with the words,—Orders for examining and settling such Accounts	Section One.
48 Geo. 3. c. 131	Woollen Manufacture Act 1808	An Act for further continuing until the First Day of May One thousand eight hundred and nine, an Act of the Forty-third Year of His present Majesty, for suspending Proceedings in Actions and other Proceedings relating to the Woollen Manufacture.	The whole act.
48 Geo. 3. c. 133	First Meetings of Commissioners Act 1808	An Act for authorizing the Treasurer appointed for the First Meeting of Commissioners and other Persons, for putting in execution certain Acts of this Session of Parliament.	The whole act.
48 Geo. 3. c. 134	Hops Act 1808	An Act to amend the Laws relating to the marking of Bags and Pockets of Hops.	The whole act.
48 Geo. 3. c. 136	Militia of Tower Hamlets Act 1808	An Act to indemnify all Officers and Persons who have carried into execution any of the Provisions of an Act passed in the last Session of Parliament, for completing and increasing the Militia of Great Britain, in relation to the Militia of the Tower Hamlets.	The whole act.
48 Geo. 3. c. 138	Teinds Act 1808	An Act for defining and regulating the Powers of the Commission of Teinds, in augmenting and modifying the Stipends of the Clergy of Scotland.	Sections Three to Six, Fifteen, and Eighteen.
48 Geo. 3. c. 139	Lotteries Act 1808	An Act for granting to His Majesty a Sum of Money to be raised by Lotteries.	The whole act.
48 Geo. 3. c. 140	Dublin Police Magistrates Act 1808	An Act for the more effectual Administration of the Office of a Justice of the Peace, and for the more effectual Prevention of Felonies within the District of Dublin Metropolis	Sections One to Thirteen and Sixteen to Twenty-seven. Section Twenty-eight from "together with" to the "same". Sections Twenty-nine, Thirty, Thirty-one and Thirty-six to Forty-six. Section Forty-seven from "the Goods" to "or in case", and from "and any such Person" to "Evidence,". Section Fifty-three from "and if any such Person so apprehended" to end of that Section. Sections Sixty to Sixty-four. Section Sixty-five from "hawk about" to "Place; or" and from "or sell Spirituous" to "Metropolis,". Section Sixty-six from "every such Person" to "Sale; and", from "and before any Person shall sell" to "of Reception for nightly Lodgers", from "for his or her" to "Merchandise, or", and from "or selling Spirituous Liquors" to "(as the Case may be)". Sections Seventy-one, Seventy-two, Seventy-six to Ninety, Ninety-five to One hundred and seventeen, One hundred and twenty-four, One hundred and twenty-five, One hundred and twenty-six, and One hundred and twenty-eight.
48 Geo. 3. c. 141	Assessment of Taxes Act 1808	An Act to amend the Acts relating to the Duties of Assessed Taxes, and of the Tax upon the Income of Property, Professions, Trades, and Offices, and to regulate the Assessment and Collection of the same	Sections Two, Three, Seven to Eleven, Fourteen and Fifteen.
48 Geo. 3. c. 142	Life Annuities Act 1808	An Act for enabling the Commissioners for the Reduction of the National Debt, to grant Life Annuities	Except Sections Twenty-one, Twenty-three, Twenty-eight, and Thirty-two.
48 Geo. 3. c. 143	Duties on Certain Licences Act 1808	An Act to repeal the Stamp Duties on Licences granted by Justices of the Peace for selling Ale, Beer, and other exciseable Liquors by Retail; and for granting other Duties in lieu thereof.	The whole act.
48 Geo. 3. c. 145	Judges' Pensions (Scotland) Act 1808	An Act for continuing certain Annuities payable to the Judges of the Court of Session, Justiciary, and Exchequer in Scotland, upon the Resignation of their Offices	All except as to the Chief Baron and Barons of the Court of Exchequer in Scotland.
48 Geo. 3. c. 146	Public Buildings (Scotland) Act 1808	An Act for vesting the Stock of the Court of Session in Scotland in Trustees, for the erecting Buildings for the better Accommodation of the College of Justice, and a Publick Gaol, in the city of Edinburgh, and for other Purposes therein mentioned.	The whole act.
48 Geo. 3. c. 147	Sale of Prize Ship Constantia Maria Act 1808	An Act to permit the Sale of the Danish Prize Ship Constantia Maria, and her Cargo, in the Port of Fowey in the County of Cornwall.	The whole act.
48 Geo. 3. c. 148	Appropriation Act 1808	An Act the title of which begins with the words,—An Act for granting to His Majesty a certain Sum of Money out of the Consolidated Fund,— and ends with the words,—appropriating the Supplies granted in this Session of Parliament.	The whole act.
48 Geo. 3. c. 149	Probate and Legacy Duties Act 1808	An Act for repealing the Stamp Duties on Deeds, Law Proceedings, and other written or printed Instruments, and the Duties on Legacies and Successions to Personal Estate upon Intestacies, now payable in Great Britain; and for granting new Duties in lieu thereof	Sections Forty-three, Forty-six, and Forty-seven.
48 Geo. 3. c. 151	Court of Session Act 1808	An Act concerning the Administration of Justice in Scotland, and concerning Appeals to the House of Lords.	Section One from "and the Lord President" to end of that Section. Sections Two and Three. Section Four from "and each" to "and eight". Sections Five, Seven, and Eight. Section Nine from "and that" to "such Lords Ordinary belong;". Section Thirteen to "Provided nevertheless, that". Section Twenty-two.
48 Geo. 3. c. 152	Duties on Worts or Wash Act 1808	An Act for granting certain Duties on Worts or Wash made from Sugar during the Prohibition of Distillation from Corn or Grain in Great Britain.	The whole act.
49 Geo. 3. c. 1	Duties on Malt, etc. Act 1809	An Act for continuing to His Majesty certain Duties on Malt, Sugar, Tobacco, and Snuff, in Great Britain; and on Pensions, Offices, and Personal Estates in England; for the Service of the Year One thousand eight hundred and nine.	The whole act.
49 Geo. 3. c. 2	Exchequer Bills Act 1809	An Act for raising the Sum of Ten millions five hundred thousand Pounds, by Exchequer Bills, for the Service of Great Britain, for the Year One thousand eight hundred and nine.	The whole act.
49 Geo. 3. c. 3	Exchequer Bills (No. 2) Act 1809	An Act for raising the Sum of One million five hundred thousand Pounds, by Exchequer Bills, for the Service of Great Britain, for the Year One thousand eight hundred and nine.	The whole act.
49 Geo. 3. c. 6	Relief of Prisoners for Debt Act 1809	An Act for the Relief of Prisoners in Custody for Non-payment of Money pursuant to Orders of Courts of Equity.	The whole act.
49 Geo. 3. c. 7	Distillation of Spirits Act 1809	An Act to prohibit the Distillation of Spirits from Corn or Grain, in the United Kingdom, for a limited Time.	The whole act.
49 Geo. 3. c. 8	Importation Act 1809	An Act to suspend the Importation of British or Irish made Spirits into Great Britain or Ireland respectively, until the First Day of June One thousand eight hundred and nine.	The whole act.
49 Geo. 3. c. 10	Bounties, etc., on Sugar Act 1809	An Act the title of which begins with the words,—An Act to continue so much of an Act of the Forty-seventh Year,—and ends with the words,—Raw Sugar exported, until the Twenty-fifth Day of March One thousand eight hundred and ten.	The whole act.
49 Geo. 3. c. 11	Bounties, etc., on Sugar (No. 2) Act 1809	An Act the title of which begins with the words,—An Act for further continuing, until the Twenty-fifth Day of March,—and ends with the words, —Sugar when the Duties imposed by an Act of the Forty-sixth Year of His present Majesty shall be suspended.	The whole act.
49 Geo. 3. c. 12	Mutiny Act 1809	An Act for punishing Mutiny and Desertion; and for the better Payment of the Army and their Quarters.	The whole act.
49 Geo. 3. c. 14	Concealment of Birth (Scotland) Act 1809	An Act for repealing an Act of the Parliament of Scotland, relative to Child Murder; and for making other Provisions in lieu thereof	Section One.
49 Geo. 3. c. 18	Importation, etc. Act 1809	An Act the title of which begins with the words,—An Act for continuing until the Twenty-fifth Day of March,—and ends with the words,—Exportation of Wool from the British Plantations in America.	The whole act.
49 Geo. 3. c. 19	Marine Mutiny Act 1809	An Act for the Regulation of His Majesty's Royal Marine Forces while on Shore.	The whole act.
49 Geo. 3. c. 20	Silk Manufactures Act 1809	An Act the title of which begins with the words,—An Act to make perpetual several Laws relating to the Encouragement of the Silk Manufacture,— and ends with the words,—Importation of Seal Skins cured with Foreign Salt free of Duty.	The whole act.
49 Geo. 3. c. 23	Exportation Act 1809	An Act the title of which begins with the words,—An Act for further continuing until the Twenty-fifth Day of March,—and ends with the words,— Corn and for allowing the Importation of other Articles of Provision without Payment of Duty.	The whole act.
49 Geo. 3. c. 24	Distillation of Spirits (No. 2) Act 1809	An Act for charging with Duty Spent Wash, re-distilled in Great Britain.	The whole act.
49 Geo. 3. c. 25	Importation (No. 4) Act 1809	An Act to permit, until the Twenty-fifth Day of May One thousand eight hundred and eleven, the Importation of Tobacco into Great Britain, from any Port whatever.	The whole act.
49 Geo. 3. c. 26	Importation (No. 5) Act 1809	An Act for allowing until the Twenty-fifth Day of March One thousand eight hundred and ten, the Importation of certain Fish from Parts of the Coast of His Majesty's North American Colonies; and for granting a Bounty thereon.	The whole act.
49 Geo. 3. c. 27	Newfoundland Act 1809	An Act for establishing Courts of Judicature in the Island of Newfoundland and the Islands adjacent; and for re-annexing Part of the Coast of Labrador and the Islands lying on the said Coast to the Government of Newfoundland	Except Section Fourteen. Repealed as to all Her Majesty's Dominions.
49 Geo. 3. c. 28	Attorneys Act 1809	An Act to enable the Clerks of the King's Coroner and Attorney in the Court of King's Bench to be admitted as Attorneys.	The whole act.
49 Geo. 3. c. 29	Flax Seed (Ireland) Act 1809	An Act for the Appropriation of Twenty thousand Pounds out of the Consolidated Fund of Ireland, towards the Encouragement of the saving of Flax Seed for Sowing in Ireland.	The whole act.
49 Geo. 3. c. 30	Exportation (No. 2) Act 1809	An Act to continue until the Twenty-fifth Day of March One thousand eight hundred and ten, certain Acts for regulating the Drawbacks and Bounties on the Exportation of Sugar from Ireland, and for warehousing in Ireland, Rum or Spirits of the British Sugar Plantations.	The whole act.
49 Geo. 3. c. 31	Exportation (No. 3) Act 1809	An Act to continue until the Twenty-fifth Day of March One thousand eight hundred and ten, an Act of the Forty-fifth Year of His present Majesty, for prohibiting the Exportation from Ireland, and for permitting the Importation into Ireland, Duty-free, of Corn and other Provisions.	The whole act.
49 Geo. 3. c. 32	Pension Duties Act 1809	An Act the title of which begins with the words,—An Act for continuing and making perpetual several Duties of One Shilling and Sixpence,—and ends with the words,—Twenty-fifth Day of March One thousand eight hundred and nine	Section One from "and the Duties hereby granted" to end of that Section. Sections Two to Six.
49 Geo. 3. c. 36	Hospitals (Ireland) Act 1809	An Act to amend an Act made in the Forty-fifth Year of His present Majesty, for amending and rendering more effectual an Act of the Parliament of Ireland, for erecting and establishing Public Infirmaries or Hospitals.	Repealed except as to the county of the city of Dublin.
49 Geo. 3. c. 37	Quartering of Soldiers Act 1809	An Act for increasing the Rates of Subsistence to be paid to Innkeepers and others on quartering Soldiers.	The whole act.
49 Geo. 3. c. 38	Payment of Creditors (Scotland) Act 1809	An Act for further continuing until the Twenty-fifth Day of July One thousand eight hundred and eleven, an Act made in the Thirty-third Year of His present Majesty, for rendering the Payment of Creditors more equal and expeditious in Scotland.	The whole act.
49 Geo. 3. c. 42	Public Records (Scotland) Act 1809	An Act for better regulating the Publick Records of Scotland	Sections Four to Seven, Fourteen, Seventeen, and Eighteen.
49 Geo. 3. c. 43	Average Price of Brown Sugar Act 1809	An Act for regulating the Mode in which the Average Price of Brown or Muscovado Sugar, exclusive of the Duty thereon, is to be ascertained under the Provisions of an Act passed in the Forty-sixth Year of His present Majesty.	The whole act.
49 Geo. 3. c. 46	Customs Act 1809	An Act to authorize the Principal Officers of the Customs in the British Colonies and Plantations in America and the West Indies, to examine Witnesses on Oath.	Repealed as to all Her Majesty's Dominions.
49 Geo. 3. c. 49	Trade of Nova Scotia, etc. Act 1809	An Act to authorize His Majesty to permit, until the Twenty-fifth Day of March One thousand eight hundred and twelve, any Goods and Commodities to be imported into and exported from Nova Scotia and New Brunswick, in any Ship or Vessel whatsoever.	The whole act.
49 Geo. 3. c. 51	Fees in Public Offices, etc. (Ireland) Act 1809	An Act the title of which begins with the words,—An Act to continue until the First Day of August,—and ends with the words,—accounting for Public Money in Ireland.	The whole act.
49 Geo. 3. c. 52	Exchequer Bills (No. 3) Act 1809	An Act for raising the Sum of Six Millions by Exchequer Bills, for the Service of Great Britain, for the Year One thousand eight hundred and nine.	The whole act.
49 Geo. 3. c. 54	Insolvent Debtors Relief (Ireland) Act 1809	An Act for the Relief of certain Insolvent Debtors in Ireland.	The whole act.
49 Geo. 3. c. 55	Land Tax Act 1809	An Act the title of which begins with the words,—An Act for rectifying Mistakes in the Names of the Commissioners,—and ends with the words, —indemnifying such Persons as have acted as Commissioners for executing the said Acts.	The whole act.
49 Geo. 3. c. 57	Beer and Malt (Ireland) Act 1809	An Act for improving the Quality of Beer in Ireland, by further preventing the Use of unmalted Corn, or of any deleterious or unwholesome Ingredients therein, and for the better securing the Collection of the Malt Duties in Ireland.	The whole act.
49 Geo. 3. c. 60	Importation (No. 6) Act 1809	An Act for allowing the Importation from any Port in Europe or Africa, of Goods or Commodities the Production of those Continents, until Six Months after the Ratification of a Definitive Treaty of Peace.	The whole act.
49 Geo. 3. c. 64	Reduction of National Debt Act 1809	An Act to amend an Act passed in the last Session of Parliament for enabling the Commissioners for the Reduction of the National Debt to grant Life Annuities.	The whole act.
49 Geo. 3. c. 67	Land Tax (No. 2) Act 1809	An Act to amend an Act passed in the Forty-sixth Year of His present Majesty, for the Redemption and Sale of the Land Tax, and to make further Provision for exonerating small Livings and Charitable Institutions from the Land Tax.	The whole act.
49 Geo. 3. c. 68	Bastardy Act 1809	An Act to explain and amend the Law of Bastardy, so far as relates to indemnifying Parishes in respect thereof.	The whole act.
49 Geo. 3. c. 72	Wide Streets and Coal Trade, Dublin Act 1809	An Act the title of which begins with the words,—An Act to continue until the Twenty-fifth Day of March,—and ends with the words,—regulating the Coal Trade thereof, and for other purposes.	The whole act.
49 Geo. 3. c. 73	Duties on Spirits (Ireland) Act 1809	An Act to grant to His Majesty Duties upon Spirits made or distilled in Ireland, and upon British Spirits imported into Ireland, and upon Licences to sell Spirituous Liquors in Ireland in Quantities not less than Two Gallons.	The whole act.
49 Geo. 3. c. 74	Duties, Drawbacks, etc. (Ireland) Act 1809	An Act to continue until the Fifth Day of July One thousand eight hundred and ten, several Acts for granting certain Rates and Duties, and for allowing certain Drawbacks and Bounties on Goods, Wares, and Merchandize imported into and exported from Ireland.	The whole act.
49 Geo. 3. c. 79	Treasury Bills (Ireland) Act 1809	An Act for raising the Sum of Five hundred thousand Pounds by Treasury Bills for the Service of Ireland for the Year One thousand eight hundred and nine.	The whole act.
49 Geo. 3. c. 80	Excise (No. 3) Act 1809	An Act for allowing Dealers to roast their own Coffee on certain Conditions.	The whole act.
49 Geo. 3. c. 84	Highways (Ireland) Act 1809	An Act for amending the Irish Road Acts.	The whole act.
49 Geo. 3. c. 85	Militia Pay (Ireland) Act 1809	An Act the title of which begins with the words,—An Act for defraying, until the Twenty-fifth Day of March,—and ends with the words,—making Allowances in certain Cases to Subaltern Officers of the said Militia during Peace.	The whole act.
49 Geo. 3. c. 87	Militia and Local Militia Pay (Great Britain) Act 1809	An Act for defraying the Charge of the Pay and Clothing of the Militia and Local Militia in Great Britain, for the Year One thousand eight hundred and nine.	The whole act.
49 Geo. 3. c. 88	Militia Allowances Act 1809	An Act for making Allowances in certain Cases to Subaltern Officers of the Militia in Great Britain, while disembodied.	The whole act.
49 Geo. 3. c. 89	Militia Allowances (No. 2) Act 1809	An Act the title of which begins with the words,—An Act to revive and continue until the Twenty-fifth Day of March,—and ends with the words, —Militia of England, disembodied under an Act of the same Session of Parliament.	The whole act.
49 Geo. 3. c. 90	Relief of Families of Militiamen (Scotland) Act 1809	An Act for providing Relief for the Wives and Families of the Militia Men in Scotland, when called into actual Service	Sections Forty to Forty-four. Section Forty-five to "made:". Section Forty-six.
49 Geo. 3. c. 92	Charge of Loans Act 1809	An Act the title of which begins with the words,—An Act for charging the Sum of Eleven Millions,—and ends with the words,—and for certain Periods after the Ratification of a Definitive Treaty of Peace.	The whole act.
49 Geo. 3. c. 93	Exchequer Bills (No. 4) Act 1809	An Act to enable the Commissioners of His Majesty's Treasury, to issue Exchequer Bills, on the Credit of such Aids or Supplies as have been or shall be granted by Parliament for the Service of Great Britain, for the Year One thousand eight hundred and nine.	The whole act.
49 Geo. 3. c. 94	Lotteries Act 1809	An Act for granting to His Majesty a Sum of Money to be raised by Lotteries.	The whole act.
49 Geo. 3. c. 99	Spirits (Ireland) Act 1809	An Act to amend the several Acts for the regulating and securing the Collection of the Duties on Spirits distilled in Ireland; and for the regulating the Sale of such Liquors by Retail.	The whole act.
49 Geo. 3. c. 101	Criminal Prosecutions Fees (Ireland) Act 1809	An Act to regulate the Fees payable by Persons charged with Treason, Felony, and all other Offences, at Assizes and Quarter Sessions in Ireland; and for amending an Act of the Parliament of Ireland, made in the Thirty-sixth Year of His present Majesty relating thereto	Section One as to the first six items (ending with the words "prepare the same."), the sixteenth, seventeenth, eighteenth, twenty-eighth and subsequent items in the Schedule to that Section. Section Two from "Sheriff or" to "or Sessions,". Sections Three to Five. Repealed except as to the county of the city of Dublin.
49 Geo. 3. c. 102	Drainage of Bogs, etc. (Ireland) Act 1809	An Act to appoint Commissioners to enquire and examine, until the First Day of August One thousand eight hundred and eleven, into the Nature and Extent of the several Bogs in Ireland, and the Practicability of draining and cultivating them, and the best Means of effecting the same.	The whole act.
49 Geo. 3. c. 104	Life Annuities Act 1809	An Act to amend several Acts made in the Parliament of Ireland, for granting Life Annuities with Benefit of Survivorship.	The whole act.
49 Geo. 3. c. 105	Importation (No. 7) Act 1809	An Act to continue, until the Twenty-fifth Day of March One thousand eight hundred and ten an Act of this present Session of Parliament, to suspend the Importation of British or Irish made Spirits into Great Britain or Ireland respectively.	The whole act.
49 Geo. 3. c. 109	Woollen Manufacture Act 1809	An Act to repeal several Acts respecting the Woollen Manufacture, and to amend other Acts relating to the said Manufacture; and for allowing Persons employed in any Branch of the Woollen Manufacture to set up Trade in any Place in Great Britain.	The whole act.
49 Geo. 3. c. 111	Inquiry into Military Departments Act 1809	An Act the title of which begins with the words,—An Act to continue, until the Twenty-fifth Day of March,—and ends with the words,—Conduct of the Public Business in the Military Departments therein mentioned.	The whole act.
49 Geo. 3. c. 114	Exchequer Bills Act 1809	An Act for enabling His Majesty to raise the Sum of Three Millions for the Service of Great Britain.	The whole act.
49 Geo. 3. c. 115	Insolvent Debtors Relief Act 1809	An Act for the Relief of certain Insolvent Debtors in England.	The whole act.
49 Geo. 3. c. 119	Administration of Justice (Scotland) Act 1809	An Act to give to the Persons named by His Majesty, pursuant to an Act passed in the last Session of Parliament, intituled An Act concerning the Administration of Justice in Scotland, and concerning Appeals to the House of Lords, further time for making their Report or Reports.	The whole act.
49 Geo. 3. c. 120	Militia (Ireland) Act 1809	An Act for amending and reducing into One Act of Parliament, the several Laws for raising and training the Militia of Ireland	Sections One and Four. Sections Eight to Eleven, Thirteen, and Fifteen to Twenty. Section Twenty-one from "although" to "for the Captains". Section Twenty-two to "and that". Sections Twenty-five and Twenty-eight. Section Thirty-six from "that all Payments" to "heretofore; and". Section Thirty-eight from "and in such Adjudication" to end of that Section. Section Thirty-nine so far as it relates to the length of time and the appointment of the time and place for training and exercise. Sections Forty-two, Fifty to Fifty-three, and Sixty-four to Seventy-three. Section Seventy-seven, the words "the Clerk of the Peace and" and from "and paid" to "Manner,". Section Seventy-eight, the words "Clerk of the Peace or". Section One hundred and twenty-four. Section One hundred and twenty-six from "That the" to "Act, and". Sections One hundred and twenty-seven and One hundred and twenty-eight. Section One hundred and thirty-two from "giving to each Man" to end of that Section. Section One hundred and forty-seven from "and shall be laid" to "thereupon". Section One hundred and forty-nine.
49 Geo. 3. c. 124	Poor (Settlement and Removal) Act 1809	An Act the title of which begins with the words,—An Act for altering, amending, and explaining certain Acts relative to the Removal of the Poor,—and ends with the words,—Relief and Employment of the Poor	The last Section.
49 Geo. 3. c. 126	Sale of Offices Act 1809	An Act for the further Prevention of the Sale and Brokerage of Offices	Section One from "the Master General" to "Ordnance," and from "the Secretary at War" to "Storekeeper General,". Sections Seven and Eight. Section Nine from "or to render" to end of that Section. Sections Twelve and Fifteen.
49 Geo. 3. c. 128	Appropriation Act 1809	An Act the title of which begins with the words,—An Act for granting to His Majesty certain Sums of Money out of the Consolidated Fund,— and ends with the words,—appropriating the Supplies granted in this Session of Parliament.	The whole act.
50 Geo. 3. c. 1	Duties on Malt, etc. Act 1810	An Act for continuing to His Majesty certain Duties on Malt, Sugar, Tobacco, and Snuff, in Great Britain; and on Pensions, Offices, and Personal Estates in England; for the Service of the Year One thousand eight hundred and ten.	The whole act.
50 Geo. 3. c. 2	Exchequer Bills Act 1810	An Act for raising the Sum of Ten millions five hundred thousand Pounds, by Exchequer Bills, for the Service of Great Britain for the Year One thousand eight hundred and ten.	The whole act.
50 Geo. 3. c. 3	Exchequer Bills (No. 2) Act 1810	An Act for raising the Sum of One million five hundred thousand Pounds, by Exchequer Bills, for the Service of Great Britain for the Year One thousand eight hundred and ten.	The whole act.
50 Geo. 3. c. 5	Distillation of Spirits Act 1810	An Act the title of which begins with the words,—An Act to prohibit the Distillation of Spirits from Corn or Grain in Great Britain for a limited Time,—and ends with the words,—Spirits into Great Britain or Ireland respectively.	The whole act.
50 Geo. 3. c. 7	Mutiny Act 1810	An Act for punishing Mutiny and Desertion; and for the better Payment of the Army and their Quarters.	The whole act.
50 Geo. 3. c. 9	Bounty of Raw Sugar Act 1810	An Act to continue, until the Twenty-fifth Day of March One thousand eight hundred and eleven, so much of an Act of the Forty-seventh Year of His present Majesty, as allows a Bounty on British Plantation Raw Sugar exported.	The whole act.
50 Geo. 3. c. 11	Greenland Whale Fishery Act 1810	An Act to continue, until the Twenty-fifth Day of March One thousand eight hundred and fifteen, several Laws relating to the Encouragement of the Greenland Whale Fisheries.	The whole act.
50 Geo. 3. c. 12	Importation and Exportation Act 1810	An Act the title of which begins with the words,—An Act to continue, until the Twenty-fifth Day of March,—and ends with the words,—Timber for Naval Purposes from the British Colonies in North America, Duty-free.	The whole act.
50 Geo. 3. c. 13	Importation and Exportation (No. 2) Act 1810	An Act the title of which begins with the words,—An Act to continue an Act, made in the Forty-fourth Year,—and ends with the words,—Colonies and Plantations, until the Twenty-fifth Day of March One thousand eight hundred and thirteen.	The whole act.
50 Geo. 3. c. 14	Marine Mutiny Act 1810	An Act for the Regulation of His Majesty's Royal Marine Forces while on Shore.	The whole act.
50 Geo. 3. c. 15	Duties on Spirits (Ireland) Act 1810	An Act to grant certain Duties upon Spirits made or distilled in Ireland from Corn; to allow certain Drawbacks on the Exportation thereof; to make further Regulations for the Encouragement of Licensed Distillers; and for amending the Laws relating to the Distillery in Ireland.	The whole act.
50 Geo. 3. c. 16	Exportation and Importation (Ireland) Act 1810	An Act the title of which begins with the words,—An Act for further continuing, until the Twenty-fifth Day of March,—and ends with the words, —Importation into Ireland, Duty-free, of Corn and other Provisions.	The whole act.
50 Geo. 3. c. 17	Exportation and Importation (Ireland) (No. 2) Act 1810	An Act to continue, until the Twenty-fifth Day of March One thousand eight hundred and eleven, an Act for regulating the Drawbacks and Bounties on the Exportation of Sugar from Ireland.	The whole act.
50 Geo. 3. c. 18	Exportation and Importation (Great Britain) Act 1810	An Act the title of which begins with the words,—An Act for further continuing until the Twenty-fifth Day of March,—and ends with the words,— Bounties on Sugar when the Duties imposed by an Act of the Forty-sixth Year of His present Majesty shall be suspended.	The whole act.
50 Geo. 3. c. 19	Exportation and Importation (Great Britain) (No. 2) Act 1810	An Act the title of which begins with the words,—An Act for further continuing, until the Twenty-fifth Day of March,—and ends with the words, —Importation of other Articles of Provision, without Payment of Duty.	The whole act.
50 Geo. 3. c. 21	Importation and Exportation (No. 3) Act 1810	An Act the title of which begins with the words,—An Act for amending and continuing to amend,—and ends with the words,—Exportation of certain Goods and Merchandize into and from certain Ports in the West Indies.	The whole act.
50 Geo. 3. c. 28	Quartering of Soldiers Act 1810	An Act for increasing the Rates of Subsistence to be paid to Innkeepers and others on quartering Soldiers.	The whole act.
50 Geo. 3. c. 29	Highways (Ireland) Act 1810	An Act to amend an Act of the last Session of Parliament, for amending the Irish Road Acts.	The whole act.
50 Geo. 3. c. 31	Session Court (Scotland) Act 1810	An Act for augmenting the Salaries of the Lords of Session, Lords Commissioners of Justiciary, and Barons of Exchequer in Scotland, and Judges in Ireland	Section One. Section Two from "to the Lord Chief Baron" to "Two thousand Pounds,". Sections Three and Four.
50 Geo. 3. c. 37	Annuity to Duke of Brunswick Act 1810	An Act for enabling His Majesty to settle an Annuity on His Serene Highness the Duke of Brunswick Wolfenbuttel.	The whole act.
50 Geo. 3. c. 39	Repayment of Duty in Certain Cases Act 1810	An Act for repaying in certain Cases the Duty paid on the Export of Foreign Plain Linen.	The whole Ac
50 Geo. 3. c. 41	Hawkers Act 1810	An Act for placing the Duties of Hawkers and Pedlars under the Management of the Commissioners of Hackney Coaches	Sections One to Four, Six to Eleven, Seventeen, and Twenty to Twenty-two. Section Twenty-three from "in any Mart" to "Market Town,". Section Twenty-four to end of Act.
50 Geo. 3. c. 43	Highland Road and Bridges (Scotland) Act 1810	An Act for maintaining and keeping in repair, Roads made and Bridges built in Scotland under Authority of the Parliamentary Commissioners for Highland Roads and Bridges.	The whole act.
50 Geo. 3. c. 50	Relief of the Poor Act 1810	An Act the title of which begins with the words,—An Act to explain and amend an Act made in the last Session,—and ends with the words,—Relief and Employment of the Poor.	The whole act.
50 Geo. 3. c. 52	Poor Act 1810	An Act to amend so much of an Act, passed in the Eighth and Ninth Year of King William the Third, as requires poor Persons receiving Alms to wear Badges.	The whole act.
50 Geo. 3. c. 53	Frauds on Exportation Act 1810	An Act for preventing Frauds relating to the Exportation of British and Irish made Malt from one part of the United Kingdom to the other.	The whole act.
50 Geo. 3. c. 57	Manufactures (Great Britain) Act 1810	An Act to revive and continue until the Twenty-fifth Day of March One thousand eight hundred and fifteen, an Act of the Twenty-third Year of His present Majesty, for the more effectual Encouragement of the Manufactures of Flax and Cotton in Great Britain.	The whole act.
50 Geo. 3. c. 58	Land Tax Redemption Act 1810	An Act to amend several Acts for the Redemption and Sale of the Land Tax	Except Section Two.
50 Geo. 3. c. 63	Exportation (No. 4) Act 1810	An Act to enable His Majesty to authorise the Exportation of the Machinery necessary for erecting a Mint in the Brazils.	The whole act.
50 Geo. 3. c. 65	Crown Lands Act 1810	An Act for uniting the Offices of Surveyor General of the Land Revenues of the Crown, and Surveyor General of His Majesty's Woods, Forests, Parks, and Chases.	The whole act.
50 Geo. 3. c. 69	Exchequer Bills (No. 3) Act 1810	An Act for raising the Sum of Six Millions by Exchequer Bills, for the Service of Great Britain, for the Year One thousand eight hundred and ten.	The whole act.
50 Geo. 3. c. 70	Exchequer Bills (No. 4) Act 1810	An Act to enable the Commissioners of His Majesty's Treasury to issue Exchequer Bills, on the credit of such Aids or Supplies as have been or shall be granted by Parliament for the Service of Great Britain, for the Year One thousand eight hundred and ten.	The whole act.
50 Geo. 3. c. 78	Suppression of Insurrection, etc. (Ireland) Act 1810	An Act to repeal an Act made in the Forty-seventh Year of His present Majesty, for suppressing Insurrection, and preventing the Disturbances of the Public Peace in Ireland.	The whole act.
50 Geo. 3. c. 79	Distillation of Spirits (Scotland) Act 1810	An Act for regulating the Continuance of Licences for distilling Spirits from Sugar in the Lowlands of Scotland.	The whole act.
50 Geo. 3. c. 80	Importation (No. 2) Act 1810	An Act the title of which begins with the words,—An Act for reviving and further continuing until the Twenty-fifth Day of March,—and ends with the words,—Fish from Parts of the Coast of His Majesty's North American Colonies, and for granting Bounties thereon.	The whole act.
50 Geo. 3. c. 81	Fees in Public Offices, etc. (Ireland) Act 1810	An Act the title of which begins with the words,—An Act to continue until the First Day of August,—and ends with the words,—accounting for Public Money in Ireland.	The whole act.
50 Geo. 3. c. 83	Woollen Manufacture Act 1810	An Act to repeal several Acts respecting the Woollen Manufacture, and for indemnifying all Persons liable to any Penalty for having acted contrary thereto.	The whole act.
50 Geo. 3. c. 84	Teinds Act 1810	An Act for augmenting Parochial Stipends, in certain Cases, in Scotland	Section Twenty-four.
50 Geo. 3. c. 85	Government Offices Security Act 1810	An Act to regulate the taking of Securities in all Offices, in respect of which Security ought to be given; and for avoiding the Grant of all such Offices, in the Event of such Security not being given within a Time to be limited after the Grant of such Office	Sections Two to Six. Section Seven, the last three provisoes, and so far as the rest of that Section relates to neglect to cause a memorial to be registered. Section Eight.
50 Geo. 3. c. 87	Courts-Martial on Troops of East India Company Act 1810	An Act to amend Two Acts, relating to the raising Men for the Service of the East India Company; and the Quartering and Billetting such Men; and to Trials by Regimental Courts Martial	Except Section Seven. Repealed as to all Her Majesty's Dominions.
50 Geo. 3. c. 88	Offices in Reversion Act 1810	An Act to make Provisions for a limited Time respecting certain Grants of Offices.	The whole act.
50 Geo. 3. c. 89	Militia Pay (Ireland) Act 1810	An Act for defraying, until the Twenty-fifth Day of March One thousand eight hundred and eleven, the Charge of the Pay and Clothing of the Militia of Ireland, and for making Allowances in certain Cases to Subaltern Officers of the said Militia during Peace.	The whole act.
50 Geo. 3. c. 90	Militia and Local Militia Pay (Great Britain) Act 1810	An Act for defraying the Charge of the Pay and Clothing of the Militia and Local Militia in Great Britain for the Year One thousand eight hundred and ten.	The whole act.
50 Geo. 3. c. 91	Militia Allowances Act 1810	An Act the title of which begins with the words,—An Act to revive and continue, until the Twenty-fifth Day of March,—and ends with the words, —Militia of England disembodied under an Act of the same Session of Parliament.	The whole act.
50 Geo. 3. c. 92	Militia Allowances (No. 2) Act 1810	An Act for making Allowances in certain Cases to Subaltern Officers of the Militia in Great Britain while disembodied.	The whole act.
50 Geo. 3. c. 94	Lotteries Act 1810	An Act for granting to His Majesty a Sum of Money to be raised by Lotteries.	The whole act.
50 Geo. 3. c. 96	Quartering of Soldiers (No. 2) Act 1810	An Act to amend an Act passed in this Session of Parliament, intituled An Act for increasing the Rates of Subsistence to be paid to Innkeepers and others on quartering Soldiers.	The whole act.
50 Geo. 3. c. 97	Importation and Exportation (Ireland) Act 1810	An Act the title of which begins with the words,—An Act to continue until the Fifth Day of July,—and ends with the words,—Drawbacks on the Exportation of certain Goods, Wares, and Merchandise into and from Ireland.	The whole act.
50 Geo. 3. c. 98	Treasury Bills (Ireland) Act 1810	An Act for raising the Sum of Two hundred and sixteen thousand Pounds by Treasury Bills for the Service of Ireland for the Year One thousand eight hundred and ten.	The whole act.
50 Geo. 3. c. 100	Fines on Stills (Ireland) Act 1810	An Act for respiting certain Fines imposed on Stills in Ireland.	The whole act.
50 Geo. 3. c. 101	Prisage and Butlerage (Ireland) Act 1810	An Act the title of which begins with the words,—An Act for carrying an Agreement for the Purchase of the Prisage and Butlerage of Wines in Ireland,—and ends with the words,—Act made in the Forty-sixth Year of His present Majesty's Reign.	The whole act.
50 Geo. 3. c. 102	Unlawful Oaths (Ireland) Act 1810	An Act for the more effectually preventing the administering and taking of unlawful Oaths in Ireland; and for the Protection of Magistrates and Witnesses in Criminal Cases	Section Ten from "and such" to "Evidence;".
50 Geo. 3. c. 105	Taxes Act 1810	An Act to regulate the Manner of making Surcharges of the Duties of Assessed Taxes, and of the Tax upon the Profits arising from Property, Professions, Trades, and Offices, and for amending the Acts relating to the said Duties respectively	Sections Four, Six, and Seven.
50 Geo. 3. c. 106	Income Tax, etc. Act 1810	An Act for regulating the Manner of assessing Lands in certain Cases to the Duties arising from the Profits of Property, Professions, Trades, and Offices, and for giving Relief from the said Duties on Occasion of Losses in other Cases therein mentioned.	The whole act.
50 Geo. 3. c. 107	Clothing of the Army, etc. Act 1810	An Act to regulate the Examination and Payment of Assignments for Clothing of His Majesty's Forces.	The whole act.
50 Geo. 3. c. 111	Pensions (Scotland) Act 1810	An Act to limit the Amount of Pensions to be granted out of the Civil List of Scotland.	The whole act.
50 Geo. 3. c. 112	Court of Session Act 1810	An Act for abridging the Form of extracting Decrees of the Court of Session in Scotland, and for the Regulation of certain Parts of the Proceedings of that Court	Section Fourteen. Section Twenty, the words "appointed by the Lord President of the College of Justice". Sections Twenty-six, Twenty-seven, Thirty-one, Thirty-nine, Forty-four to Forty-seven, Forty-nine, Fifty, and Fifty-three to Fifty-nine. The last Schedule.
50 Geo. 3. c. 113	Exchequer Bills (No. 5) Act 1810	An Act for enabling His Majesty to raise the Sum of Three Millions for the Service of Great Britain.	The whole act.
50 Geo. 3. c. 114	Exchequer Bills (East India Company) Act 1810	An Act for granting to His Majesty a Sum of Money, to be raised by Exchequer Bills, and to be advanced and applied in the Manner and upon the Terms therein mentioned, for the Relief of the United Company of Merchants of England trading to the East Indies.	The whole act.
50 Geo. 3. c. 115	Appropriation Act 1810	An Act the title of which begins with the words,—An Act for granting to His Majesty certain Sums of Money out of the Consolidated Fund,— and ends with the words,—appropriating the Supplies granted in this Session of Parliament.	The whole act.

== See also ==
- Statute Law Revision Act
