= Blackwell Hall =

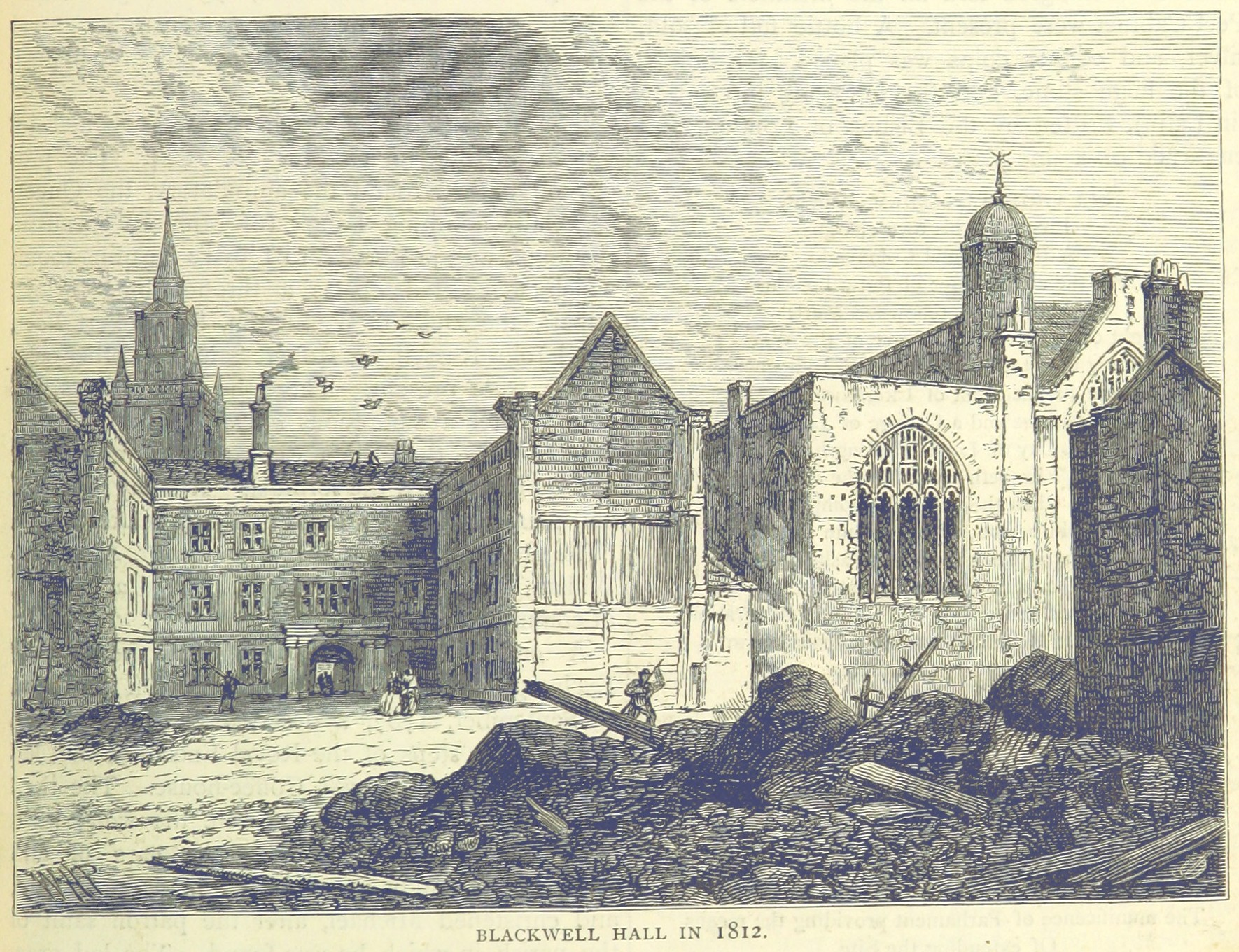
Blackwell Hall, partially demolished in 1812. The view is from Basinghall Street. To the right is the Chapel of Mary Magdalene.

Blackwell Hall in the City of London (also known as Bakewell Hall) was the centre for the wool and cloth trade in England from mediaeval times until the 19th century. Cloth manufacturers and clothiers from provincial England brought their material to Blackwell Hall to display and sell it to merchants and drapers.

== History ==
Blackwell Hall was originally a buttressed stone hall adjacent to the Guildhall in private occupation dating from the early 13th century. In 1395, the City of London Corporation purchased it from the de Bankwell family (from which it derives its name) and it was established as a cloth market under Dick Whittington's first mayoralty in 1397 in order to provide the first place where non-citizen and foreigners could buy and sell cloth. It was rebuilt in 1588 and again after the Great Fire of London. It was demolished along with the chapel in 1820.

Blackwell Hall Act 1696
- Act of Parliament
- Parliament of England
- Long title: An Act to restore the Markett att Blackwell-Hall to the Clothiers & for regulating the Factors there.
- Citation: 8 & 9 Will. 3. c. 9
- Territorial extent: England and Wales

Dates
- Royal assent: 8 March 1697
- Commencement: 1 May 1697 (Note: Section 1.)
- Repealed: 15 July 1867
Other legislation
Amended by	City of London Courts of Justice Act 1815
Repealed by	Statute Law Revision Act 1867

Status: Repealed

Text of statute as originally enacted

In the 17th century manufactured woollen cloth was the primary commodity traded in England, much of this passing through Blackwell Hall for the London market and for export. In the mid 17th century Blackwell Hall Factors were introduced as agents who charged a fee to handle the trade. By the 1690s the Blackwell-hall Factors had almost completely taken over the market and clothiers had lost their ancient right of selling their own goods. This was a long-running controversy. In 1697 the Blackwell Hall Act 1696 (8 & 9 Will. 3. c. 9) was passed "to restore the Markett att Blackwell-Hall to the Clothiers & for regulating the Factors there". The act was ineffective and complaints about the factors continued until the middle of the 18th century.

There were about fifty Blackwell-Hall Factors at the end of the 17th century. They provided an important service to England's main industry at the time, supplying raw materials to the clothiers and giving credit to clothiers, drapers and exporters. This required considerable capital and although factors were still very active in the mid-18th century, their number had declined to a few wealthy men. The Gentleman's Magazine in 1739 noted:

"The Blackwell-Hall factor, originally but the servant of the maker, is now become his master, and not only his but the wool-merchant's and draper's too".

By the 1780s the increasingly mechanised cloth trade, particularly in Yorkshire, was being handled by local merchants rather than through London, and the East India Company was handling its own exports. Blackwell Hall's business declined and the building was demolished between 1812 and 1820 to make way for the Bankruptcy Court, which started operating in January 1822.
