= Woollen Trade Act 1833 =

Act of the Parliament of the United Kingdom

- Act of Parliament
- Parliament of the United Kingdom
- Long title: An Act to repeal an Act of the Thirteenth Year of His Majesty King George the First, for the better Regulation of the Woollen Trade.
- Citation: 3 & 4 Will. 4. c. 28
- Introduced by: George Howard, 7th Earl of Carlisle MP (Commons)
- Territorial extent: United Kingdom

Dates
- Royal assent: 24 July 1833
- Commencement: 24 July 1833 (Note: The Acts of Parliament (Commencement) Act 1793.)
- Repealed: 16 July 1874
Other legislation
Repeals/revokes	See § Repealed enactments
Repealed by	Statute Law Revision Act 1874
Relates to	Woollen Manufacture Act 1809; Woollen Manufacture Act 1810; City of London Courts of Justice Act 1815; Importation (No. 4) Act 1816; Repeal of Acts Concerning Importation Act 1822; Repeal of Acts Concerning Importation (No. 2) Act 1822

Status: Repealed

Text of statute as originally enacted

The Woollen Trade Act 1833 (3 & 4 Will. 4. c. 28) was an act of the Parliament of the United Kingdom that repealed the Woollen Manufacture Act 1726 (13 Geo. 1. c. 23).

== Background ==
The committee appointed to consider of the state of the woollen manufacture of England reported on 19 May 1808, resolving to repeal various old acts relating to the manufacture of wool in the United Kingdom.

In 1809 and 1810 respectively, the Woollen Manufacture Act 1809 (49 Geo. 3. c. 109) and the Woollen Manufacture Act 1810 (50 Geo. 3. c. 83) were passed, which repealed over 40 enactments related to the manufacture of wool in the United Kingdom.

== Passage ==
Leave to bring in the Woollen Trade Bill to the House of Commons was granted to George Howard, 7th Earl of Carlisle MP, Sir George Strickland, 7th Baronet MP and John Marshall MP on 14 June 1833. The bill had its first reading in the House of Commons on 14 June 1833, presented by George Howard, 7th Earl of Carlisle MP, MP. The bill had its second reading in the House of Commons on 18 June 1833 and was committed to a committee of the whole house, which met and reported on 18 June 1833, without amendments. The bill had its third reading in the House of Commons on 19 June 1833 and passed, without amendments.

The bill had its first reading in the House of Lords on 20 June 1833. The bill had its second reading in the House of Lords on 21 June 1833 and was committed to a committee of the whole house. The bill was committed to a select committee on 3 July 1833 to consider the petition of Spinners of Wool and Weavers employed in the West Riding of the County of York, consisting of 17 members:

Name	Commentary
Sir George Staunton, 2nd Baronet	
David Boyle, Lord Boyle	
Lloyd Kenyon, 3rd Baron Kenyon	
George Eden, 1st Earl of Auckland	
James Stuart-Wortley, 1st Baron Wharncliffe	
Archibald Primrose, 4th Earl of Rosebery	
William Best, 1st Baron Wynford	
Arthur Chichester, 1st Baron Templemore	
Frederick John Robinson, 1st Earl of Ripon	
Charles Gordon-Lennox, 5th Duke of Richmond	
Anthony Ashley-Cooper, 7th Earl of Shaftesbury	
James St Clair-Erskine, 3rd Earl of Rosslyn	
Archibald Acheson, 2nd Earl of Gosford	
Henry Lascelles, 3rd Earl of Harewood	
John Edward Cornwallis Rous, 2nd Earl of Stradbroke	
Thomas Reynolds-Moreton, 1st Earl of Ducie	Added on 4 July 1833
William Berkeley, 1st Earl FitzHardinge	Added on 4 July 1833

The select committee resolved in favour of the bill on 9 July 1833 and the bill was committed to a committee of the whole house, which met and reported on 10 July 1833, without amendments. The bill had its third reading in the House of Lords on 11 July 1833 and passed, without amendments.

The bill was granted royal assent on 24 July 1833.

== Provisions ==
Section 1 of the act repealed the Woollen Manufacture Act 1726 (13 Geo. 1. c. 23).

== Subsequent developments ==
The whole act was repealed by section 1 of, and the schedule to, the Statute Law Revision Act 1874 (37 & 38 Vict. c. 35), which came into force on 16 July 1874.
