= List of acts of the Parliament of England from 1557 =

This is a list of acts of the Parliament of England for the year 1557.

For acts passed during the period 1707–1800, see the list of acts of the Parliament of Great Britain. See also the list of acts of the Parliament of Scotland, and the list of acts of the Parliament of Ireland.

For acts passed from 1801 onwards, see the list of acts of the Parliament of the United Kingdom. For acts of the devolved parliaments and assemblies in the United Kingdom, see the list of acts of the Scottish Parliament, the list of acts of the Northern Ireland Assembly, and the list of acts and measures of Senedd Cymru; see also the list of acts of the Parliament of Northern Ireland.

For medieval statutes, etc. that are not considered to be acts of Parliament, see the list of English statutes.

See also the List of ordinances and acts of the Parliament of England, 1642–1660 for ordinances and acts passed by the Long Parliament and other bodies without royal assent, and which were not considered to be valid legislation following the Restoration in 1660.

The number shown after each act's title is its chapter number. Acts are cited using this number, preceded by the years of the reign during which the relevant parliamentary session was held; thus the Union with Ireland Act 1800 is cited as "39 & 40 Geo. 3. c. 67", meaning the 67th act passed during the session that started in the 39th year of the reign of George III and which finished in the 40th year of that reign. The modern convention is to use Arabic numerals in citations (thus "41 Geo. 3" rather than "41 Geo. III"). Acts of the last session of the Parliament of Great Britain and the first session of the Parliament of the United Kingdom are both cited as "41 Geo. 3".

Acts passed by the Parliament of England did not have a short title; however, some of these acts have subsequently been given a short title by acts of the Parliament of the United Kingdom, such as the Short Titles Act 1896 (59 & 60 Vict. c. 14).

Acts passed by the Parliament of England were deemed to have come into effect on the first day of the session in which they were passed. Because of this, the years given in the list below may in fact be the year before a particular act was passed.

== 4 & 5 Ph. & M. ==
The 3rd Parliament of King Philip and Queen Mary, which met from 20 January 1558 until 7 March 1558.

This session was also traditionally cited as 4 & 5 Phil. & Mary, 4 & 5 Phil & Mar. or 4 & 5 P. & M.

=== Public acts ===
Short title	Citation	Royal assent
Long title
Crown Lands Act 1557 (repealed)	4 & 5 Ph. & M. c. 1	7 March 1558
An Act for the Confirmation of Letters Patents. (Repealed by Statute Law Revision Act 1948 (11 & 12 Geo. 6. c. 62))
Military Service Act 1557 (repealed)	4 & 5 Ph. & M. c. 2	7 March 1558
An Act for the having of Horse Armour and Weapons. (Repealed by Continuance, etc. of Laws Act 1603 (1 Jas. 1. c. 25))
Military Service (No. 2) Act 1557 (repealed)	4 & 5 Ph. & M. c. 3	7 March 1558
An Act for the taking of Musters. (Repealed by Statute Law Revision Act 1863 (26 & 27 Vict. c. 125))
Accessories in Murder, etc. Act 1557 (repealed)	4 & 5 Ph. & M. c. 4	7 March 1558
An Act that Accessaries in Murder, and divers Felonies, shall not have the Benefit of Clergy. (Repealed for England and Wales by Offences Against the Person Act 1828 (9 Geo. 4. c. 31) and for India by Criminal Law (India) Act 1828 (9 Geo. 4. c. 74))
Woollen Cloths Act 1557 (repealed)	4 & 5 Ph. & M. c. 5	7 March 1558
An Act touching the making of woolen clothes. (Repealed by Woollen Manufacture Act 1809 (49 Geo. 3. c. 109) and City of London Courts of Justice Act 1815 (55 Geo. 3. c. xciii))
Aliens Act 1557 (repealed)	4 & 5 Ph. & M. c. 6	7 March 1558
An Act to enquire of the Behaviour of Frenchmen being Denizens. (Repealed by Statute Law Revision Act 1863 (26 & 27 Vict. c. 125))
Juries Act 1557 (repealed)	4 & 5 Ph. & M. c. 7	7 March 1558
An Act to make up the Jury de Circumstantibus, where the Queen is a Party. (Repealed by Juries Act 1825 (6 Geo. 4. c. 50))
Abduction Act 1557 (repealed)	4 & 5 Ph. & M. c. 8	7 March 1558
An Act for the Punishment of such as shall take away, or marry, Maidens, Inheritors, without Consent of their Parents. (Repealed for England and Wales by Offences Against the Person Act 1828 (9 Geo. 4. c. 31) and for India by Criminal Law (India) Act 1828 (9 Geo. 4. c. 74))
Continuance of Laws Act 1557 (repealed)	4 & 5 Ph. & M. c. 9	7 March 1558
An Act for the Continuation of certain Statutes. (Repealed by Statute Law Revision Act 1863 (26 & 27 Vict. c. 125))
Taxation Act 1557 (repealed)	4 & 5 Ph. & M. c. 10	7 March 1558
An Act for the Confirmation of the Subsidy of the Clergy. (Repealed by Statute Law Revision Act 1863 (26 & 27 Vict. c. 125))
Taxation (No. 2 Act 1557 (repealed)	4 & 5 Ph. & M. c. 11	7 March 1558
An Act of a Subsidy, and one Fifteenth, granted by the Temporalty. (Repealed by Statute Law Revision Act 1863 (26 & 27 Vict. c. 125))

=== Private acts ===
Short title	Citation	Royal assent
Long title
Assurance of Honour of Raleigh to the Queen by Lord Ryche.	4 & 5 Ph. & M. c. 1 Pr.	7 March 1558
An Act for the Assurance of the Honour of Raigslaye to the Queen, from the Lord Ryche.
Assurance of the Countess of Sussex's jointure.	4 & 5 Ph. & M. c. 2 Pr.	7 March 1558
An Act for the Jointure of the Countess of Sussex.
Restitution in blood of Sir Ambrose Dudley and Sir Robert Dudley.	4 & 5 Ph. & M. c. 3 Pr.	7 March 1558
An Act for the Restitution in Blood of Sir Ambrose and Sir Robert Dudleye, Knights.
Stoke Poges Hospital Act 1557	4 & 5 Ph. & M. c. 4 Pr.	7 March 1558
An Act for the Foundation of an Hospital at Stokepuges, in the County of Bucks, by the Lord Hastings of Loughborowe.
Tithes (Coventry) Act 1557	4 & 5 Ph. & M. c. 5 Pr.	7 March 1558
An Act for the Payment of Tythes, in the City of Coventrye.

=== Sources ===
- "4° & 5° Phil. & Mar.". The Statutes of the Realm. Vol. 4 Part 1: 1547 to 1584. pp. 313–348 – via Internet Archive.
- "4° & 5° Phil. & Mar.". The Statutes of the Realm. Vol. 4 Part 1: 1547 to 1584. pp. 313–348 – via HathiTrust.
- "4° & 5° Phil. & Mar.". The Statutes of the Realm. Vol. 4 Part 1: 1547 to 1584. pp. 313–348 – via Google Books.
- Pickering, Danby, ed. (1763). "Anno quarto & quinto Philippi & Mariæ". The Statutes at Large. Vol. 6: from the First Year of Queen Mary to the Thirty-fifth Year of Queen Elizabeth, inclusive. Cambridge: Joseph Bentham. pp. 90–107 – via Internet Archive.
- Pickering, Danby, ed. (1763). "Anno quarto & quinto Philippi & Mariæ". The Statutes at Large. Vol. 6: from the First Year of Queen Mary to the Thirty-fifth Year of Queen Elizabeth, inclusive. Cambridge: Joseph Bentham. pp. 90–107 – via Internet Archive.
- Journal of the House of Commons. Vol. 1 – 1547-1629. His Majesty's Stationery Office. 1802 – via British History Online.
- Journal of the House of Lords. Vol. 1: 1509-1577. London: His Majesty's Stationery Office. 1830 – via British History Online.
- Chronological Table of and Index to the Statutes. Vol. 1: To the End of the Session 59 Vict. Sess. 2 (1895) (13th ed.). London: Her Majesty's Stationery Office. 1896. p. 58 – via Google Books.
- Chronological Table of the Statutes: Covering the Period from 1235 to the End of 1971. London: Her Majesty's Stationery Office. 1972. pp. 55–56. ISBN 978-0-11-840096-1 – via Google Books.
- "Chronological Tables of the Private and Personal Acts: Part 1 (1539–1601)". legislation.gov.uk. The National Archives.

== See also ==
- List of acts of the Parliament of England
