= List of acts of the Parliament of England from 1513 =

This is a list of acts of the Parliament of England for the year 1513.

For acts passed during the period 1707–1800, see the list of acts of the Parliament of Great Britain. See also the list of acts of the Parliament of Scotland, and the list of acts of the Parliament of Ireland.

For acts passed from 1801 onwards, see the list of acts of the Parliament of the United Kingdom. For acts of the devolved parliaments and assemblies in the United Kingdom, see the list of acts of the Scottish Parliament, the list of acts of the Northern Ireland Assembly, and the list of acts and measures of Senedd Cymru; see also the list of acts of the Parliament of Northern Ireland.

For medieval statutes, etc. that are not considered to be acts of Parliament, see the list of English statutes.

See also the List of ordinances and acts of the Parliament of England, 1642–1660 for ordinances and acts passed by the Long Parliament and other bodies without royal assent, and which were not considered to be valid legislation following the Restoration in 1660.

The number shown after each act's title is its chapter number. Acts are cited using this number, preceded by the years of the reign during which the relevant parliamentary session was held; thus the Union with Ireland Act 1800 is cited as "39 & 40 Geo. 3. c. 67", meaning the 67th act passed during the session that started in the 39th year of the reign of George III and which finished in the 40th year of that reign. The modern convention is to use Arabic numerals in citations (thus "41 Geo. 3" rather than "41 Geo. III"). Acts of the last session of the Parliament of Great Britain and the first session of the Parliament of the United Kingdom are both cited as "41 Geo. 3".

Acts passed by the Parliament of England did not have a short title; however, some of these acts have subsequently been given a short title by acts of the Parliament of the United Kingdom, such as the Short Titles Act 1896 (59 & 60 Vict. c. 14).

Acts passed by the Parliament of England were deemed to have come into effect on the first day of the session in which they were passed. Because of this, the years given in the list below may in fact be the year before a particular act was passed.

== 5 Hen. 8 ==
The third session of the 2nd Parliament of King Henry VIII, which met from 23 January 1514 until 4 March 1514.

This session was also traditionally cited as 5 H. 8.

Note that cc. 9–19 were traditionally cited as private acts cc. 1–11.

| Short title | Citation | Royal assent |
Long title
| Debts to Merchants of Tournai, etc. in France Act 1513 (repealed) | 5 Hen. 8. c. 1 | 4 March 1514 |
An Act concerning Ministration of Justice in the City of Turneye. (Note: Tournai, captured in the Battle of the Spurs and ruled by England between 1513 and 1519, when it was returned to France under the terms of the Treaty of London.) (Repealed by Statute Law Revision Act 1863 (26 & 27 Vict. c. 125))
| Cloths Act 1513 (repealed) | 5 Hen. 8. c. 2 | 4 March 1514 |
An Act concerning White Cloths in Devonshire. (Repealed by Woollen Manufacture Act 1810 (50 Geo. 3. c. 83))
| Exportation Act 1513 (repealed) | 5 Hen. 8. c. 3 | 4 March 1514 |
An Act that White Cloths under Five Marks may be carried over the Sea unshorn. (Repealed by Woollen Manufacture Act 1810 (50 Geo. 3. c. 83), confirmed by Repeal of Acts Concerning Importation Act 1822 (3 Geo. 4. c. 41))
| Worsteds Act 1513 (repealed) | 5 Hen. 8. c. 4 | 4 March 1514 |
An Act for avoiding Deceits in Worsteds. (Repealed by Repeal of Obsolete Statutes Act 1856 (19 & 20 Vict. c. 64))
| Juries in London Act 1513 (repealed) | 5 Hen. 8. c. 5 | 4 March 1514 |
An Act concerning Juries in London. (Repealed by Statute Law Revision Act 1863 (26 & 27 Vict. c. 125))
| Surgeons Act 1513 (repealed) | 5 Hen. 8. c. 6 | 4 March 1514 |
An Act that Surgeons be discharged of Constableship and other Things. (Repealed by Juries Act 1825 (6 Geo. 4. c. 50) and Statute Law Revision Act 1948 (11 & 12 Geo. 6. c. 62))
| Leather Act 1513 (repealed) | 5 Hen. 8. c. 7 | 4 March 1514 |
An Act that Strangers buy no Leather but in open Market. (Repealed by Leather Act 1562 (5 Eliz. 1. c. 8), confirmed by Repeal of Acts Concerning Importation Act 1822 (3 Geo. 4. c. 41))
| Pardon Act 1513 (repealed) | 5 Hen. 8. c. 8 | 4 March 1514 |
An Act concerning the Grant of the King's general Pardon. (Repealed by Statute Law Revision Act 1863 (26 & 27 Vict. c. 125))
| Creation of Duke of Norfolk Act 1513 (repealed) | 5 Hen. 8. c. 9 (Note: This is the citation in The Statutes of the Realm.); 5 Hen. 8. c. 1 Pr. (Note: This is the citation in The Statutes at Large.) | 4 March 1514 |
An Act for the confirmation of letters patents made to the duke of Norfolk. (Repealed by Statute Law (Repeals) Act 1978 (c. 45))
| Creation of Duke of Suffolk Act 1513 (repealed) | 5 Hen. 8. c. 10; 5 Hen. 8. c. 2 Pr. | 4 March 1514 |
An Act for the confirmation of letters patents made to the duke of Suffolk. (Repealed by Statute Law (Repeals) Act 1978 (c. 45))
| Creation of Earl of Surrey Act 1513 (repealed) | 5 Hen. 8. c. 11; 5 Hen. 8. c. 3 Pr. | 4 March 1514 |
An Act for the confirmation of letters patents made to the earl of Surry. (Repealed by Statute Law (Repeals) Act 1978 (c. 45))
| Restitution of the Countess of Salisbury (Margaret Pole) Act 1513 (repealed) | 5 Hen. 8. c. 12; 5 Hen. 8. c. 4 Pr. | 4 March 1514 |
The Restitucion of the Countesse of Salisbury. (Repealed by Statute Law (Repeals) Act 1977 (c. 18))
| Restitution of Humphrey Stafford Act 1513 (repealed) | 5 Hen. 8. c. 13; 5 Hen. 8. c. 5 Pr. | 4 March 1514 |
The Restitucion of Humfrey Stafford. (Repealed by Statute Law (Repeals) Act 1977 (c. 18))
| Dowry of Countess of Oxford Act 1513 (repealed) | 5 Hen. 8. c. 14; 5 Hen. 8. c. 6 Pr. | 4 March 1514 |
An Act for the confirmation of the dowry of the countess of Oxford. (Repealed by Statute Law (Repeals) Act 1978 (c. 45))
| Restitution of John Audley Act 1513 (repealed) | 5 Hen. 8. c. 15; 5 Hen. 8. c. 7 Pr. | 4 March 1514 |
The Restitucion of John Audeley. (Repealed by Statute Law (Repeals) Act 1977 (c. 18))
| Offices of Packing Woollen Cloth, etc. in London Act 1513 | 5 Hen. 8. c. 16; 5 Hen. 8. c. 8 Pr. | 4 March 1514 |
An Act for confirmation of letters patents made to the mayor and commonality of the city of London, concerning the packing of woolen cloths and other merchandises.
| Taxation Act 1513 (repealed) | 5 Hen. 8. c. 17; 5 Hen. 8. c. 9 Pr. | 4 March 1514 |
An Act for a subsidy to be granted to the King. (Repealed by Statute Law Revision Act 1863 (26 & 27 Vict. c. 125))
| Sir Edward Poynings Act 1513 (repealed) | 5 Hen. 8. c. 18; 5 Hen. 8. c. 10 Pr. | 4 March 1514 |
An Act concerning Sir Edward Poynings. (Repealed by Statute Law (Repeals) Act 1978 (c. 45))
| John Heron's Appointment as Surveyor of Customs) Act 1513 (repealed) | 5 Hen. 8. c. 19; 5 Hen. 8. c. 11 Pr. | 4 March 1514 |
An Acte concernyng Surveyorshipe in the Port of London. (Repealed by Statute Law Revision Act 1948 (11 & 12 Geo. 6. c. 62))

=== Sources ===
- "5° Hen. VIII". The Statutes of the Realm. Vol. 3: 1509 to 1547. pp. 92–120 – via HathiTrust.
- "5° Hen. VIII". The Statutes of the Realm. Vol. 3: 1509 to 1547. pp. 92–120 – via Google Books.
- "Anno quinto Henrici VIII". The Statutes at Large. Vol. 4 - 1 Richard III to 31 Henry VIII - 1483-4 to 1539. pp. 129–133 – via Internet Archive.
- "Anno quinto Henrici VIII". The Statutes at Large. Vol. 4 - 1 Richard III to 31 Henry VIII - 1483-4 to 1539. pp. 129–133 – via Internet Archive.
- "Anno quinto Henrici VIII". The Statutes at Large. Vol. 4 - 1 Richard III to 31 Henry VIII - 1483-4 to 1539. pp. 129–133 – via Internet Archive.
- Journal of the House of Lords. Vol. 1: 1509-1577. London: His Majesty's Stationery Office. 1830 – via British History Online.
- Chronological Table of and Index to the Statutes. Vol. 1: To the End of the Session 59 Vict. Sess. 2 (1895) (13th ed.). London: Her Majesty's Stationery Office. 1896. p. 44 – via Google Books.
- Chronological Table of the Statutes: Covering the Period from 1235 to the End of 1971. London: Her Majesty's Stationery Office. 1972. p. 39. ISBN 978-0-11-840096-1 – via Google Books.

== See also ==
- List of acts of the Parliament of England
