= City of London Courts of Justice Act 1815 =

Act of the Parliament of the United Kingdom

- Act of Parliament
- Parliament of the United Kingdom
- Long title: An Act to enable the Mayor and Commonalty and Citizens of the City of London, to provide convenient Courts of Justice in and for the said City.
- Citation: 55 Geo. 3. c. xciii
- Territorial extent: United Kingdom

Dates
- Royal assent: 28 June 1815
- Commencement: 28 June 1815 (Note: The Acts of Parliament (Commencement) Act 1793.)
- Repealed: 31 January 2013
Other legislation
Amends	See § Repealed enactments
Repeals/revokes	See § Repealed enactments
Repealed by	Statute Law (Repeals) Act 2013
Relates to	Woollen Manufacture Act 1809

Status: Repealed

Text of statute as originally enacted

The City of London Courts of Justice Act 1815 (55 Geo. 3. c. xciii) was a local act of the Parliament of the United Kingdom that reformed the courts of justice of the City of London and authorised the purchase of Guildhall Chapel and Blackwell Hall to erect new facilities for the Courts of King's Bench, Common Pleas, and Requests.

== Provisions ==
=== Repealed enactments ===
Section 1 of the act repealed 4 enactments as far as related to the market of Blackwell Hall and the site thereof.

Citation	Short title	Title	Extent of repeal
4 & 5 Ph. & M. c. 5	Woollen Cloths Act 1557	An Act made and passed in the Fourth and Fifth Years of the Reign of and Mary, King Philip and Queen Mary, intituled An Act touching the making of Woollen Cloths.	The whole act.
39 Eliz. 1. c. 20	Cloth Act 1597	Another Act made and passed in the Thirty-ninth Year of the Reign of Queen Elizabeth, intituled An Act against the deceitful sretching and tentering of Northern Cloth.	The whole act.
8 & 9 Will. 3. c. 9	Blackwell Hall Act 1696	Another Act made and passed in the Eighth and Ninth Years of the Reign of King William and intituled An Act to restore the Market at Blackwell Hall to the Clothiers, and Mary, and for regulating the Factors there.	The whole act. (Note: This act was wholly repealed for the avoidance of doubt by the Statute Law Revision Act 1867 (30 & 31 Vict. c. 59). The note to that act states "Repealed (among other Acts) so far as relates to the Market at Blackwell-Hall and the site thereof by 55 Geo. 3. c. xciii. s. 1. If this express repeal is not total, residue virtually repealed by same Act or obsolete.")
1 Geo. 1. St. 2. c. 15	Woollen Manufacture Act 1714	Another Act made and passed the First Year of the Reign of His Majesty King George the First, intituled An Ac to make an Act of the Tenth rear of Her late Majesty, intituled An Act for regulating, improving, and encouraging of the Woollen Manufacture of mixed or medley Broad Cloth, and for the better Payment of the Poor employed therein, (Note: Woollen Manufacture Act 1711 (10 Ann. c. 26)) more effectual for the Benefit of Trade in general; and also to render more effectual an Act of the Seventh rear of Her said Majesty's Reign, intituled An Act for the better ascertaining the Lengths and Breadth of Woollen Cloths made in the County of York. (Note: Woollen Cloth Act 1708 (7 Ann. c. 13))	The whole act.

== Subsequent developments ==
The qualified terms of the repeal led to several acts being repealed by later acts, including the Statute Law Revision Act 1867 (30 & 31 Vict. c. 59).

The whole act was repealed by section 1 of, and part 5 of the schedule to, the Statute Law (Repeals) Act 2013, which came into force on 31 January 2013.
