= Continuance, etc. of Laws Act 1603 =

Act of the Parliament of England

Continuance, etc. of Laws Act 1601
- Act of Parliament
- Parliament of England
- Long title: An Acte for continuynge and revivinge of divers Statutes and for repealinge of some others.
- Citation: 1 Jas. 1. c. 25 (Note: This is the citation in The Statutes of the Realm.); 2 Jas. 1. c. 25 (Note: This is the citation in The Statutes at Large.)
- Territorial extent: England and Wales

Dates
- Royal assent: 7 July 1604
- Commencement: 19 March 1604 (Note: Start of session.)
- Repealed: 28 July 1863

Other legislation
- Amends: See § Revived and continued enactments
- Repeals/revokes: See § Repealed enactments
- Repealed by: Statute Law Revision Act 1863
- Relates to: Continuance of Laws Act 1571; Ecclesiastical Leases Act 1572; Continuance, etc. of Laws Act 1584; Continuance, etc. of Laws Act 1586; Continuance, etc. of Laws Act 1588; Continuance, etc. of Laws Act 1592; Continuance, etc. of Laws Act 1597; Continuance, etc. of Laws Act 1601; Continuance, etc. of Laws Act 1623

Status: Repealed

Text of statute as originally enacted

The Continuance, etc. of Laws Act 1603 (1 Jas. 1. c. 25) was an act of the Parliament of England that revived, continued and repealed various older acts.

== Provisions ==
Section 2 of the act permitted the exportation of corn when not exceeding 26s 8d per quarter for wheat, 15s per quarter for rye and 14s per quarter for barley, and imposed a duty of 2s per quarter for wheat and 16p per quarter for other grains.

Section 3 of the act provided that the exportation of corn may be prohibited by royal proclamation.

Section 4 of the act exempted cheaper Welsh cotton fabrics (under 15 pence per yard or 2 shillings per goad) from dimensional regulations provided they weren't adulterated with deceptive materials.

=== Revived and continued enactments ===
Section 1 of the act continued 34 enactments, listed in that section, until the end of the next session of parliament.

Citation	Short title	Description	Extent of continuation
21 Hen. 8. c. 12	Manufacture of Cables, etc. Act 1529	One act made in the one and twentieth year of the reign of the late King Henry the Eighth, intituled, An act for the true making of cables, halsers and ropes.	The whole act.
24 Hen. 8. c. 9	Killing Weanlings Act 1532	An act made in the four and twentieth year of the reign of the said King Henry the Eighth, intituled, An act against killing of young beasts called weanlings.	The whole act.
3 & 4 Edw. 6. c. 19	Buying Cattle Act 1549	Two acts made in the parliament holden at Westminster by prorogation the fourth day of November, and continued until the first day of February next after, in the third and fourth years of the reign of the late King Edward the sixth; the one concerning the buying and selling of rother beasts and cattle;.	The whole act.
3 & 4 Edw. 6. c. 21	Butter and Cheese Act 1549	Two acts made in the parliament holden at Westminster by prorogation the fourth day of November, and continued until the first day of February next after, in the third and fourth years of the reign of the late King Edward the sixth; the other intituled, An act for the buying and selling of butter and cheese.	The whole act.
1 Eliz. 1. c. 17	Fisheries Act 1558	One act made in the first year of the reign of the late Queen Elizabeth, intituled, An act for preservation of spawn and fry of fish.	The whole act.
5 Eliz. 1. c. 7	Importation Act 1562	An act made in the fifth year of the reign of the said late Queen Elizabeth, intituled, An act for avoiding divers foreign wares made by handicraftsmen beyond the seas.	The whole act.
5 Eliz. 1. c. 5	Maintenance of the Navy Act 1562	Another act made in the same year, intituled, An act touching certain politick constitutions made for the maintenance of the navy.	As is not repealed by any later statute nor doth concern the transporting of herring or other sea-fish, nor freedom of custom, subsidy or tonnage for the same, nor transportation of corn; together with all and every other additions, explanations and alterations made thereunto or thereof, or of any part thereof, by any statute or statutes made sithence the making of the said last mentioned act, and now standing in force.
8 Eliz. 1. c. 10	Bows Act 1566	An act made in the eighth year of the reign of the said late Queen Elizabeth, intituled, An act for bowyers and the price of bows.	The whole act.
13 Eliz. 1. c. 21	Purveyance Act 1571	Three acts made in the thirteenth year of her late Majesty's reign: one, intituled, An act that purveyors shall not take victuals, within five miles of Cambridge and Oxford, in certain cases.	The whole act.
13 Eliz. 1. c. 10	Ecclesiastical Leases Act 1571	Three acts made in the thirteenth year of her late Majesty's reign: another, An act against frauds defeating remedies for dilapidations	The whole act.
13 Eliz. 1. c. 20	Benefices Act 1571	Three acts made in the thirteenth year of her late Majesty's reign: the third, An act touching leases of hospitals, alms-houses and other ecclesiastical living with cure, together with all and every explanations, additions and alterations thereof, or of any of them, or to any of them, made by several statutes of the fourteenth, eighteenth and three and fortieth years of her said late Majesty's reign.	The whole act.
18 Eliz. 1. c. 20	Road Repairs (Oxford) Act 1575	An act made in the eighteenth year of her said Majesty's reign, intituled, An act for the repairing and amending of bridges and highways near unto the city of Oxford.	The whole act.
18 Eliz. 1. c. 3	Poor Act 1575	One other act made the same eighteenth year, intituled, An act for setting the poor on work, and avoiding of idleness.	As concerneth bastards begotten out of lawful matrimony. I.e., section 1.
27 Eliz. 1. c. 31 (Note: This is the citation in The Statutes of the Realm.) 27 Eliz. 1. c. 17 (Note: This is the citation in [[The Statutes at Large].)	Government of the City of Westminster Act 1584	Two acts made in the seven and twentieth year of her said Majesty's reign, the one intituled, An act for the good government of the city or borough of Westminster.	The whole act.
27 Eliz. 1. c. 14	Malt Act 1584	Two acts made in the seven and twentieth year of her said Majesty's reign, the other, An act for reducing of divers statutes for the making of malt.	The whole act.
39 Eliz. 1. c. 16	Malt Act 1597	Together also with an act made in the nine and thirtieth year of her said Majesty's reign, intituled, An act to restrain the excessive making of malt.	The whole act.
27 Eliz. 1. c. 24	Norfolk Coast Sea Defences Act 1584	A third act made in the said seven and twentieth year of her said Majesty's reign, intituled, An act for keeping the sea-banks and sea-works in the county of Norfolk.	The whole act.
31 Eliz. 1. c. 8	Sale of Beer Act 1588	Two acts made in the one and thirtieth year of her said Majesty's reign; the one intituled, An act for the true gauging of vessels brought from beyond the seas, converted by brewers for the utterance and sale of ale and beer;.	The whole act.
31 Eliz. 1. c. 5 Pr.	Relief of the City of Lincoln Act 1588	Two acts made in the one and thirtieth year of her said Majesty's reign; the other, An act for reviving and enlarging of a statute made in the three and twentieth year of her said Majesty's reign, for the relief of the city of Lincoln.	The whole act.
35 Eliz. 1. c. 1	Religion Act 1592	Three acts made in the five and thirtieth year of her said Majesty's reign; one intituled, An act to retain the Queen's majesty subjects in their due obedience.	The whole act.
35 Eliz. 1. c. 10	Cloth Act 1592	Three acts made in the five and thirtieth year of her said Majesty's reign; another for reformation of sundry abuses in clothes called Devonshire kersies or dozens, according to a proclamation of the four and thirtieth year of her said Majesty's reign	The whole act.
35 Eliz. 1. c. 11	Clapboard Act 1592	Three acts made in the five and thirtieth year of her said Majesty's reign; the third, An act for the bringing in of clap-board from the parts beyond the seas, and the restraining of the transporting of white-ashes, for the sparing and preserving of timber within the realm.	The whole act.
39 Eliz. 1. c. 1	Houses of Husbandry Act 1597	Several acts hereafter mentioned, made in the nine and thirtieth year of her said Majesty's reign, that is to say, an act intituled, An act against the decaying of towns, and houses of husbandry	The whole act.
39 Eliz. 1. c. 2	Tillage Act 1597	An act, intituled, An act for the maintenance of husbandry and tillage.	The whole act together with such explanations and provisions as thereunto are added by the statute made in the three and fortieth year of her said Majesty's reign. (Note: Continuance of Laws, etc. Act 1601 (43 Eliz. 1. c. 9).)
39 Eliz. 1. c. 10	Navigation Act 1597	An act, intituled, An act for the increase of mariners, and for maintenance of the navigation, repealing a former act made in the three and fortieth year of her said Majesty's reign, bearing the same title.	The whole act.
39 Eliz. 1. c. 12	Labourers Act 1597	An act, intituled, An act for explanation of the statute made in the fifth year of her said Majesty's reign, concerning labourers.	The whole act.
39 Eliz. 1. c. 14	Importation Act 1597	An act, intituled, An act prohibiting the bringing into this realm of foreign cards.	The whole act.
39 Eliz. 1. c. 17	Vagabonds Act 1597	An act, intituled, An act against lewd and wandering persons, pretending to be soldiers or mariners.	The whole act.
39 Eliz. 1. c. 4	Vagabonds (No. 2) Act 1597	An act, intituled, An act for the punishment of rogues, vagabonds and sturdy beggars.	The whole act with this proviso to be annexed thereunto by authority of this present parliament; That the said last mentioned act, nor any thing therein contained, shall impeach, avoid, prejudice or infringe such liberty and inheritance of John Dutton of Dutton in the county of Chester, esq; and his ancestors, whereof he is, or they have lawfully used and exercised, in showing minstrels in the county palatine and county of the city of Chester, and in governing of minstrels there, and keeping a court yearly for the same purpose.
43 Eliz. 1. c. 3	Disabled Soldiers Act 1601	The several acts hereafter mentioned, made in the three and fortieth year of the reign of the said late Queen Elizabeth, that is to say, an act, intituled, An act for the necessary relief of soldiers and mariners.	The whole act.
43 Eliz. 1. c. 6	Frivolous Suits Act 1601	An act, intituled, An act to avoid trifling and frivolous suits in law in her Majesty's courts at Westminster.	The whole act.
43 Eliz. 1. c. 2	Poor Relief Act 1601	An act, intituled, An act for the relief of the poor.	The whole act with this addition, viz. be it enacted, That all persons, to whom the overseers of the poor shall, according to this act, bind any children apprentices, may take and receive, and keep them as apprentices; any former statute to the contrary notwithstanding.
43 Eliz. 1. c. 10	Woollen Cloth Act 1601	An act, intituled, An act for the true making and working of woollen clothes.	The whole act.
43 Eliz. 1. c. 5	Inferior Court Act 1601	An act, intituled, An act to prevent perjury and subornation of perjury, and unnecessary expenses in suits in law.	The whole act.

Section 5 of the act revived and continued the Perjury Act 1562 (5 Eliz. 1. c. 9) until the end of the next session of parliament. Section 5 of the act also revived the Tenths Act 1572 (14 Eliz. 1. c. 7) and the Lands of Crown Accountants Act 1584 (27 Eliz. 1. c. 3), effective from the end of the present session of parliament. Section 5 of the act also revived and continued so much of the Vagabonds Act 1572 (14 Eliz. 1. c. 5) "as concerneth the taxing, rating, levying, receiving and employing of gaol money" (section 38) until the end of the next session of parliament.Section 6 of the act continued the Lyme Regis Pier Act 1584 (27 Eliz. 1. c. 1 Pr.) until the end of the next session of parliament ten years from the start of the present session of parliament.

Section 8 of the act revived and made perpetual the Clergy Marriage Act 1548 (2 & 3 Edw. 6. c. 21) and the Clergy Marriage Act 1551 (5 & 6 Edw. 6. c. 12), and declared that the children of clergy affected by the act were legitimate.

=== Repealed enactments ===
Section 7 of the act repealed all statutes made before 35 Eliz. 1 "as concerneth abjured persons and sanctuaries, or ordering or governing persons abjured or in sanctuaries". Section 7 of the act repealed 15 enactments, listed in that section, as well as "all other acts heretofore made concerning apparel".

Citation	Short title	Description	Extent of repeal
22 Edw. 4. c. 5	Fulling Mills Act 1482	An act made in the two and twentieth year of the reign of King Edward the Fourth against fulling of hats, bonnets and caps in fulling mills.	The whole act.
3 Hen. 8. c. 15	Hats and Caps Act 1511	An act made in the third year of King Henry the Eighth, intituled, An act concerning the making of caps and hats.	The whole act.
21 Hen. 8. c. 9	Prices of Foreign Hats, etc. Act 1529	An act made in the one and twentieth year of King Henry the Eighth, intituled, An act limiting the prices of hats and caps brought from beyond the seas.	The whole act.
7 Edw. 6. c. 8	Fulling of Caps Act 1553	An act made in the seventh year of King Edward the Sixth, intituled, An act for the true fulling and thicking of caps.	The whole act.
1 Mar. Sess. 2	Hats and Caps Act 1553	An act made in the first year of Queen Mary, intituled, An act for the sale of hats and caps made beyond the sea.	The whole act.
4 Hen. 5. Stat. 2. c. 3	Pattens Act 1416	An act made in the fourth year of King Henry the Fifth, That patten-makers should make no pattens nor clogs of timber called asp.	The whole act.
4 Edw. 4. c. 9 (Note: The margin note incorrectly cites this as "4 Edw. IV. c. 9".)	Pattens Act 1464	Together with an act made in the fourth year of King Edward the Fourth, That patten-makers might make pattens or clogs of such pieces of timber called asp, as was not convenient or sufficient for shafts.	The whole act.
15 Ric. 2. c. 11	Girdlers	An act made in the fifteenth year of King Richard the Second, touching girdlers garnishing their girdles with white metal.	The whole act.
5 & 6 Edw. 6. c. 21	Pedlars Act 1551	An act made in the fifth year of King Edward the Sixth, intituled, An act against pedlars and tinkers.	The whole act.
7 Edw. 6. c. 5	Wines Act 1553	An act made in the seventh of the reign of the said King Edward the Sixth, intituled, An act made to avoid the great and excessive prices of wines.	As doth concern the letting of wine at certain prices, or forbidding or restraining the having of wines in mens houses. I.e., sections 1 and 2.
4 Edw. 4. c. 8 (Note: The margin note incorrectly cites this as "4 Edw. IV. c. 8".)	Horn Act 1464	An act made in the fourth year of King Edward the Fourth, That no stranger or alien should buy any English horn unwrought, and that the wardens of the homers should have power to search all manner of wares pertaining to their mystery in London, and four and twenty miles on every fide of it.	The whole act.
24 Hen. 8. c. 13	Apparel Act 1532	An act made in the five and twentieth year of the late King Henry the Eighth for reformation in excess of apparel.	The whole act.
1 & 2 Ph. & M. c. 8	Apparel Act 1554	Together with another act bearing the fame title, made in the first and second years of the reign of the late King Philip and Queen Mary.	The whole act.
4 & 5 Ph. & M. c. 2	Military Service Act 1557	An act made in the fourth and fifth years of the late King Philip and Queen Mary, for the having and keeping of horse, armour and weapon.	The whole act.
5 Eliz. 1. c. 8	Leather Act 1562	A statute made in the fifth year of the reign of our late sovereign lady Queen Elizabeth, intituled, An act touching hewers, tanners, curriers, shoemakers and other artificers dealing in the cutting of leather.	The whole act.

Section 8 of the act repealed the First Statute of Repeal (1 Mar. Sess. 2. c. 2).

== Subsequent developments ==
The whole act was repealed by section 1 of, and the schedule to, the Statute Law Revision Act 1863 (26 & 27 Vict. c. 125), which came into force on 28 July 1863.

The limited territorial extent of the act to England and Wales meant that several acts were later repealed by the Statute Law Revision (Ireland) Act 1872 (35 & 36 Vict. c. 98), which repealed for Ireland statutes from the Magna Carta until 1495 that were extended to Ireland by the passage of Poynings' Law 1495 (10 Hen. 7. c. 22 (I)).
