= Continuance of Laws, etc. Act 1627 =

Act of the Parliament of England

- Act of Parliament
- Parliament of England
- Long title: An Act for the continuance and repeal of divers statutes.
- Citation: 3 Cha. 1 . c. 5
- Territorial extent: England and Wales; Ireland

Dates
- Royal assent: 10 March 1629
- Commencement: 17 March 1628 (Note: Start of session.)
- Repealed: England and Wales: 28 July 1863; Northern Ireland: 23 May 1950
Other legislation
Amends	See § Continued enactments and § Repealed enactments
Repeals/revokes	See § Repealed enactments
Amended by	Residence on Benefices, etc. (England) Act 1817; Usury Laws Repeal Act 1854; Salmon Fishery Act 1861
Repealed by	Statute Law Revision Act 1863; Northern Ireland: Statute Law Revision Act 1950
Relates to	See Expiring laws continuance acts

Status: Repealed

Text of statute as originally enacted

Revised text of statute as amended

The Continuance of Laws, etc. Act 1627 (3 Cha. 1 . c. 5) was an act of the Parliament of England that made perpetual, continued and repealed various older enactments.

== Background ==
In the United Kingdom, acts of Parliament remain in force until expressly repealed. Many acts of parliament, however, contained time-limited sunset clauses, requiring legislation to revive enactments that had expired or to continue enactments that would otherwise expire.

== Provisions ==
=== Continued enactments ===
Section 1 of the act made the Fisheries Act 1558 (1 Eliz. 1. c. 17), except a proviso for certain river rents to the crown, the Benefices Act 1571 (13 Eliz. 1. c. 20), as amended by the Ecclesiastical Leases Act 1572 (14 Eliz. 1. c. 11), the Ecclesiastical Leases Act 1575 (18 Eliz. 1. c. 11) and the Continuance, etc. of Laws Act 1601 (43 Eliz. 1.c . 9), the Preservation of Timber Act 1584 (27 Eliz. 1. c. 19) and the Execution Act 1605 (3 Jas. 1. c. 8) perpetual.

Section 2 of the act made the Usury Act 1623 (21 Jas. 1. c. 17) perpetual.

Section 3 of the act continued the Yarmouth Worsteds Act 1529 (21 Hen. 8. c. 12), as continued and amended by sections 1 and 3 of the Buying Cattle Act 1549 (3 & 4 Edw. 6. c. 19), the Butter and Cheese Act 1549 (3 & 4 Edw. 6. c. 21), as amended by the Butter and Cheese Act 1623 (21 Jas. 1. c. 22), the Maintenance of the Navy Act 1562 (5 Eliz. 1. c. 5) as not repealed "nor doth concern the eating of Flesh or using the Flesh uppon the Wednesday, Nor the transportation of Herring or other Sea Fish Nor Freedome of Subsidie or Tonnage for the same, Nor transportacion of Corne, nor the phibiting the or Ling in Barrell or other Caskes" and as amended by the Butter and Cheese Act 1623 (21 Jas. 1. c. 22), the Importation Act 1562 (5 Eliz. 1. c. 7), the Bows Act 1566 (8 Eliz. 1. c. 10), the Purveyance Act 1571 (13 Eliz. 1. c. 21), the Vagabonds Act 1572 (14 Eliz. 1. c. 5) "as concerneth the taxing rating levying and imploying of Gaole money", the Poor Act 1575 (18 Eliz. 1. c. 3) "as concerneth Bastards begotten out of lawfull Matrimonie with this all Justice of the peace within their severall limits and pcincts and in their severall Sessions may doe and execute all things concerning that part of the said Statute that by Justice of the Peace in the severall Counties are by the said Statute lymited to be done", the Continuance of Laws, etc. Act 1627 (18 Eliz. 1. c. 20), the Government of the City of Westminster Act 1584 (27 Eliz. 1. c. 17 Pr.), (Note: This is the citation in The Statutes of the Realm.) the Malt Act 1584 (27 Eliz. 1. c. 14), the Norfolk Coast Sea Defences Act 1584 (27 Eliz. 1. c. 24), the Sale of Beer Act 1588 (31 Eliz. 1. c. 8), the Cloth Act 1592 (35 Eliz. 1. c. 10), the Clapboard Act 1592) 35 Eliz. 1. c. 11), so much of the Religion Act 1592 (35 Eliz. 1. c. 1) as unrepealed, the Vagabonds Act 1597 (39 Eliz. 1. c. 4), as amended by section 20 of the Continuance, etc. of Laws Act 1603 (1 Jas. 1. c. 25), the Navigation Act 1597 (39 Eliz. 1. c. 10), the Importation Act 1597 (39 Eliz. 1. c. 14), the Malt Act 1597 (39 Eliz. 1. c. 16), the Vagabonds (No. 2) Act 1597 (39 Eliz. 1. c. 17), the Disabled Soldiers Act 1601 (43 Eliz. 1. c. 3), the Frivolous Suits Act 1601 (43 Eliz. 1. c. 6), the Poor Relief Act 1601 (43 Eliz. 1. c. 2), as amended by section 23 of the (1 Jas. 1. c. 25) and with further amendments, the Woollen Cloth Act 1601 (43 Eliz. 1. c. 10), the Inferior Court Act 1601 (43 Eliz. 1. c. 5), the Vagabonds Act 1603 (1 Jas. 1. c. 7), the Statute of Stabbing 1603 (1 Jas. 1. c. 8), the Leather Act 1603 (1 Jas. 1. c. 22) save as repealed by the Leather Act 1606 (4 Jas. 1. c. 6), the Game Act 1603 (1 Jas. 1. c. 27), the Hops Act 1603 (1 Jas. 1. c. 18), the Labourers Act 1603 (1 Jas. 1. c. 6), the Plague Act 1603 (1 Jas. 1. c. 31), the Skinners Act 1605 (3 Jas. 1. c. 9), the Conveyance of Offenders to Gaol Act 1605 (3 Jas. 1. c. 10), the Exportation Act 1605 (3 Jas. 1. c. 11), the Stealing of Deer, etc. Act 1605 (3 Jas. 1. c. 13), the Land Inclosure (Herefordshire) Act 1606 (4 Jas. 1. c. 11), the Criminal Law Act 1609 (7 Jas. 1. c. 1), the Vagabonds Act 1609 (7 Jas. 1. c. 4), the Game Act 1609 (7 Jas. 1. c. 11), the Shop-books Evidence Act 1609 (7 Jas. 1. c. 12), the Deer Stealing Act 1609 (7 Jas. 1. c. 13), the Sea Sand (Devon and Cornwall) Act 1609 (7 Jas. 1. c. 18), the Wild-fowl Act 1533 (25 Hen. 8. c. 11) as much as repealed by the Wild Fowl Act 1549 (3 & 4 Edw. 6. c. 7) and revived by section 9 of the Continuance, etc. of Laws Act 1623 (21 Jas. 1. c. 28), the Sherborne Causeway Act 1554 (1 Marr. Sess. 3. c. 5) as revived by section 10 of the Continuance, etc. of Laws Act 1623 (21 Jas. 1. c. 28), the Female Convicts Act 1623 (21 Jas. 1. c. 6), the Woollen Cloths Act 1623 (21 Jas. 1.c . 18), the Woollen Cloths Act 1606 (4 Jas. 1. c. 20) as much as in force on the last day of the session 21 Jas. 1, the Profane Swearing Act 1623 (21 Jas. 1. c. 20), the Concealment of Birth of Bastards Act 1623 (21 Jas. 1. c. 27) and the Sunday Observance Act 1625 (1 Cha. 1. c. 1) until the end of the first session of the next parliament.

Section 4 of the act provided that any parts of the aforementioned acts that were not changed by new acts in this session of parliament would stay in effect after the present session of parliament ended.

Section 5 of the act provided that when grain prices at specified havens and places fell below certain thresholds (wheat at 32 shillings per quarter, rye at 20 shillings, peas and beans at 16 shillings and barley or malt at 16 shillings), subjects of the King could lawfully transport and sell these grains to any territories beyond the seas, with the King receiving customs duties of 2 shillings per quarter of exported wheat and 16 pence per quarter of other exported grains.

Section 6 of the act provided that the King could issue proclamations to temporarily prohibit the export of grain from the realm or specific ports during times when such restrictions were deemed necessary, with penalties for violations as established by existing laws and statutes.

Section 7 of the act provided that no person would be penalised for deficiencies in the length, width or weight of Welsh cotton priced at 15 pence per yard or 2 shillings per goad as long as they were not mixed with hair or other deceptive materials, except for those above that price which could be mixed as specified or could shrink up to half a yard per 12 yards of length, weigh less than 14 ounces per yard, or measure less than three quarters of a yard in width.

Section 9 of the act continued the Inundations, Norfolk and Suffolk Act 1609 (7 Jas. 1. c. 20) until the end of the next session of parliament.

=== Repealed enactments ===
Section 8 of the act repealed section 1 of the Trade Act 1392 (16 Ric. 2. 1), 16 Ric. 2. c 4, the 20 Ric. 2. c. 2), the 1 Hen. 4. c. 7, the Liveries Act 1405 (7 Hen. 4. c. 14), 13 Hen. 4. c. 3, 8 Hen. 6. 4, the Liveries Act 1468 (8 Edw. 4. c. 2), the Star Chamber Act 1487 (3 Hen. 7. c. 1) as relates to liveries (Note: Section 1.) and the King's Officers and Tenants Act 1487 (3 Hen. 7. c. 12).

== Subsequent developments ==
So much of the act as made the Usury Act 1623 (21 Jas. 1. c. 17) perpetual (i.e., section 2) was repealed by section 1 of, and the schedule to, the Usury Laws Repeal Act 1854 (17 & 18 Vict. c. 90), which came into force on 10 August 1854.

Section 1 of the act was repealed by section 39 of, and the schedule to, the Salmon Fishery Act 1861 (24 & 25 Vict. c. 109), which came into force on 1 October 1861.

The Select Committee on Temporary Laws, Expired or Expiring, appointed in 1796, inspected and considered all temporary laws, observing irregularities in the construction of expiring laws continuance acts, making recommendations and emphasising the importance of the Committee for Expired and Expiring Laws.

The limited territorial extent of the act meant that some enactments repealed by the act were repealed by subsequent statute law revision acts, including:

- The Repeal of Obsolete Statutes Act 1856 (19 & 20 Vict. c. 64)

So much of the act "as relates to spiritual persons holding of farms, and to leases of benefices and livings, and to buying and selling, and to residence of spiritual persons on their benefices" was repealed by section 1 of the Residence on Benefices, etc. (England) Act 1817 (57 Geo. 3. c. 99), which came into force on 10 July 1817.

The whole act was repealed for England and Wales by section 1 of, and the schedule to, the Statute Law Revision Act 1863 (26 & 27 Vict. c. 125), which came into force on 28 July 1863.

In section 22 of the act, the words " an Act intituled, An Act for the increase of mariners, and for maintenance of navigation, repealing a former Act made in the three and twentieth year of her said Majesty's reign, bearing the same title," were repealed for Northern Ireland by section 1(1) of, and the first schedule to, the Statute Law Revision Act 1950 (14 Geo. 6. c. 6), which came into force on 23 May 1950.
