= Continuance, etc. of Laws Act 1584 =

Act of the Parliament of England

- Act of Parliament
- Parliament of England
- Long title: An Act for the reviving, continuance, explanation, and perfecting of divers statutes.
- Citation: 27 Eliz. 1. c. 11
- Territorial extent: England and Wales

Dates
- Royal assent: 14 September 1585
- Commencement: 9 June 1585 (Note: The Feast of Pentecost.)
- Repealed: 28 July 1863

Other legislation
- Amends: See § Revived and continued enactments
- Amended by: Continuance, etc. of Laws Act 1586; Continuance, etc. of Laws Act 1588; Continuance, etc. of Laws Act 1592; Continuance, etc. of Laws Act 1597
- Repealed by: Statute Law Revision Act 1863
- Relates to: See Expiring laws continuance acts

Status: Repealed

Text of statute as originally enacted

The Continuance, etc. of Laws Act 1584 (27 Eliz. 1. c. 11) was an act of the Parliament of England that continued and revived various older acts.

== Provisions ==
Section 2 of the act made it lawful to import pins made from overseas.

Section 3 of the act repealed so much of the Maintenance of the Navy Act 1562 (5 Eliz. 1. c. 5) as "concerne the eatinge of Fish or restraine the eating of Fish or prohibiting the sufferinge of any Flesh to be eaten, uppon any Wednesday".

Section 4 of the act provided that fish may be sold on Flesh Days.

Section 5 of the act provided that from the Feast of Pentecost next ensuing, no Innholder, Taverner, Alehouse Keeper, Common Vitteler, Common Coke, or Common Table Keeper shall sell flesh victuals on Fridays, Saturdays, Fish Days, or during Lent (except to those with lawful license), upon pain of forfeiting five pounds and suffering ten days imprisonment without bail for each offence.

Section 6 of the act provided that no person could be sued or troubled for offences contrary to the Tillage Act 1562 (5 Eliz. 1. c. 2) unless the legal action was brought within two years after the right of action accrued to the person suing. Additionally, any information exhibited specifically for the Queen's Majesty, her Heirs and Successors had to be brought within five years after the action or information accrued to the Crown.

Section 7 of the act provided that this act would continue until the end of the next session of parliament.

=== Repealed and continued enactments ===
Section 1 of the act revived and continued 18 enactments until the end of the next session of parliament, effective from the Feast of Pentecost.

Citation	Short title	Description	Extent of continuation
21 Hen. 8. c. 12	Manufacture of Cables, etc. Act 1529	In the first Session of Parliament begunne in the Citie of London the thirde day of November in the xxj yeere of the Raigne of our late Soveraigne Lord of famous Memorie Kinge Henry the Eight, and from thence adjourned and proroged to the Pallace of Westminster, an Acte or Statute was made intituled An Acte for the true making of Cables Halsers and Ropes.	The whole act.
24 Hen. 8. c. 9	Killing Weanlings Act 1532	In the Parliament holden upon prorogation at Westminster the iiij day of Februarie in the xxiiij yeere of the Raigne of the said Kinge, one other Acte was then and there intituled An Acte against Pillage of younge Beestes called Weanlinges.	The whole act.
3 & 4 Edw. 6. c. 19	Buying Cattle Act 1549	In the Session of Parliament ended at Westminster the first day of February in the iiij yeere of the Raigne of our late Soveraigne Lord Kinge Edwarde the Sixt, one Acte was made concerning the buyinge and selling of Rother Beastes and [Cattell?].	The whole act.
3 & 4 Edw. 6. c. 21	Butter and Cheese Act 1549	One other Acte was then and there likewise made, intituled An Acte for the buying and selling of Butter and Cheese.	The whole act.
1 Eliz. 1. c. 17	Fisheries Act 1558	In the Parliament begunne at Westminster the xviij day of Januarie in the first yeere of the Raigne of thee Queenes Majestie that nowe is, and ther continued by Prorogation until the Dissolution thereof, one Acte was then and there made, intituled An Acte for Preservation of Spawne and Frye of Fish.	The whole act.
5 Eliz. 1. c. 2	Tillage Act 1562	In the first Session of the Parliament holden at Westminster the xxij day of Januarie in the fifth yeere of her Highnesse Raigne, one Act was then and there made, intituled An Acte for the Maintenance and Increase of Tillage.	The whole act.
5 Eliz. 1. c. 7	Importation Act 1562	One other Acte was then and there likewise mad, intituled An Acte for the avoyding of divers forreigne Wares [made?] by Handicrafters beyond the Seas.	The whole act.
5 Eliz. 1. c. 9	Perjury Act 1562	One other Acte for the Punishment of such persons as shoulde procure or committ any willfull Perjurie.	The whole act.
5 Eliz. 1. c. 5	Maintenance of the Navy Act 1562	One other Acte was then and there made, intituled An Act touching certaine politique Considerations made for the Maintenance of the Navie.	The whole act.
8 Eliz. 1. c. 10	Bows Act 1566	In the last Session of the Parliament holden by Prorogation at Westminster, the last day of September in viij yeere of her Majesties Raigne, one Acte was then and there made, intituled An Acte for [Recovery?] and the prices of Bowes.	The whole act.
13 Eliz. 1. c. 5	Fraudulent Conveyances Act 1571	In the Parliament begunne & holden at Westminster the second day of Aprill in the xiij yere of her Majesties Raigne, one Acte was then and there made for the avoyding and abolishinge of feigned covenous and fraudulent Feoffementes Giftes Grauntes Alienations Bargles Suites Judgmentes and Executions, intituled An Acte against fraudulent Deedes Giftes Grauntes Alienations, &c.	The whole act.
13 Eliz. 1. c. 20	Benefices Act 1571	In the said Parliament began and holden at Westminster the said seconds day of April, there was also one othere Acte and Statute made for the avoyding of some Leases in certaine Cases to bee made of Ecclesiasticall Promotions with Cure, intituled An Acte touching Leases of Benefices and other Ecclesiasticall Livings with Cure.	The whole act.
13 Eliz. 1. c. 21	Purveyance Act 1571	One other Acte and Statute made in the same Parliament begunne & holden at Westminster the saide secounds day of Aprill in the said xiij yere, intituled An Acte that Purveyours may take Graine Corne or Victuals within five Miles of Cambridge and Oxeforde.	The whole act.
13 Eliz. 1. c. 8	Usury Act 1571	One other Acte was then and there made, intituled An Acte against Userie.	The whole act.
14 Eliz. 1. c.11	Ecclesiastical Leases Act 1572	In the Parliament holden at Westminster the Eighth Day of May in the xiiij yere of her Highnesse Raigne, there was one other Acte made, intituled An Acte for the continuation explanation printing and inlarging of divers Statutes.	The whole act.
5 Eliz. 1. c. 13	Highways Act 1562	In the first Session of the Parliament begun and holden at Westminster the xxj day of Januarie in the v yere of her Highnesse Raigne, and from thence adjourned by Prorogation until the Dissolution thereof, there was one other Acte made for the reviving of a Statute of Secundo Tertio Philippi & Marie, for the amending of High wayes. (Note: Highways Act 1555 (2 & 3 Ph. & M. c. 8))	The whole act.
14 Eliz. 1. c. 5	Vagabonds Act 1572	In the first Session of Parliament begun and holden at Westminster the Eight Day of May in the xiiij yere of the Queenes Highnesse Raigne that nowe is, and thence continued by Prorogation till the Dissolution thereof, there was one other Acte made, intituled An Acte for the punishment of Vagabondes and for the Reliefe of the Poore and Impotent.	The whole act.
18 Eliz. 1. c. 3	Poor Act 1575	In the Parliament holden at Westminster aforesaid in the xviij yeer of her Majesties Raigne, ther was one other Acte [made?] intituled An Acte for the setting of the Poore on worke, and for the avoyding of Idlenesse.	The whole act.

== Subsequent developments ==
The act was continued until the end of the next session of parliament by the Continuance, etc. of Laws Act 1586 (29 Eliz. 1. c. 5), Continuance, etc. of Laws Act 1588 (31 Eliz. 1. c. 10) and the Continuance, etc. of Laws Act 1592 (35 Eliz. 1. c. 7).

The whole act was continued until the end of the next session of parliament by the Continuance, etc. of Laws Act 1597 (39 Eliz. 1. c. 18), except for provisions relating to the Importation Act 1562 (5 Eliz. 1. c. 7), the Maintenance of the Navy Act 1562 (5 Eliz. 1. c. 5), the Tillage Act 1562 (5 Eliz. 1. c. 2), the Caps Act 1571 (13 Eliz. 1. c. 19), the Vagabonds Act 1572 (14 Eliz. 1. c. 5), the Poor Act 1575 (18 Eliz. 1. c. 3), the Dover Harbour Act 1580 (23 Eliz. c. 6) and the Disabled Soldiers Act 1592 (35 Eliz. c. 4).

The whole act was repealed by section 1 of, and the schedule to, the Statute Law Revision Act 1863 (26 & 27 Vict. c. 125), which came into force on 28 July 1863.
