= Vagabonds Act 1572 =

Act of the Parliament of England

- Act of Parliament
- Parliament of England
- Long title: An Act for the Punishment of Vagabonds, and for the Relief of the Poor and Impotent.
- Citation: 14 Eliz. 1. c. 5
- Territorial extent: England and Wales

Dates
- Royal assent: 30 June 1572
- Commencement: 24 August 1572 (Note: The Feast of Saint Bartholomew the Apostle.)
- Repealed: 28 July 1863

Other legislation
- Repeals/revokes: Vagabonds Act 1530; Vagabonds Act 1549; Poor Act 1562
- Amended by: Poor Act 1575; Continuance, etc. of Laws Act 1584; Continuance, etc. of Laws Act 1586; Continuance, etc. of Laws Act 1588; Continuance, etc. of Laws Act 1592; Continuance, etc. of Laws Act 1597; Continuance, etc. of Laws Act 1603; Continuance, etc. of Laws Act 1623; Continuance of Laws, etc. Act 1627
- Repealed by: Statute Law Revision Act 1863
- Relates to: Poor Act 1575; Vagabonds Act 1597

Status: Repealed

Text of statute as originally enacted

The Vagabonds Act 1572 or the Vagabonds, etc. Act 1572 (14 Eliz. 1. c. 5) was an act of the Parliament of England under Queen Elizabeth I. It is a part of the Tudor Poor Laws and a predecessor to the Elizabethan Poor Laws.

The act provided that justices of the peace were to register the names of the "aged, decayed, and impotent" poor to determine how much money was required to care for them. The justices of the peace would then assess all inhabitants of the parish for their keep. Overseers of the poor would periodically conduct "views and searches" of the poor. Those refusing to contribute to poor relief would be confined to the gaol.

Justices of the Peace were allowed to license beggars if there were too many for the parish to provide for. Any unlicensed vagabonds were to be whipped and burned through the ear. It further provided that any surplus funds could be used to “place and settle to work the rogues and vagabonds.”

Combined with the Poor Act 1575 (18 Eliz. 1. c. 3), the act formed the basis for the subsequent Elizabethan Poor Laws.

The act was an incentive for itinerant playing companies to find sponsors who could provide them with a permanent play house and thus avoid prosecution as vagabonds.

== Subsequent developments ==
The act was continued until the end of the next session of parliament by the Continuance, etc. of Laws Act 1584 (27 Eliz. 1. c. 11), the Continuance, etc. of Laws Act 1586 (29 Eliz. 1. c. 5), the Continuance, etc. of Laws Act 1588 (31 Eliz. 1. c. 10), the Continuance, etc. of Laws Act 1592 (35 Eliz. 1. c. 7), the Continuance, etc. of Laws Act 1597 (39 Eliz. 1. c. 18) and the Continuance, etc. of Laws Act 1623 (21 Jas. 1. c. 28).

So much of the act "as concerneth the taxing, rating, levying, receiving and employing of gaol money" (section 38) until the end of the next session of parliament" (section 38) was revived and continued until the end of the next session of parliament by the Continuance, etc. of Laws Act 1603 (1 Jas. 1. c. 25).

So much of the act "as concerneth the taxing, rating, levying, receiving and employing of gaol money" (section 38) until the end of the first session of the next parliament by section 1 of the Continuance, etc. of Laws Act 1623 (21 Jas. 1. c. 28).

So much of the act "as concerneth the taxing, rating, levying, receiving and employing of gaol money" (section 38) until the end of the first session of the next parliament by section 3 of the Continuance of Laws, etc. Act 1627 (3 Cha. 1 . c. 5).

The whole act was repealed by section 1 of, and the schedule to, the Statute Law Revision Act 1863 (26 & 27 Vict. c. 125), which came into force on 28 July 1863.

== See also ==
- Vagabonds Act
