= Poor Act 1575 =

Act of the Parliament of England

- Act of Parliament
- Parliament of England
- Long title: An Act for the setting of Poor on Work, and for the avoiding of Idleness.
- Citation: 18 Eliz. 1. c. 3
- Territorial extent: England and Wales

Dates
- Royal assent: 15 March 1576
- Commencement: 8 February 1576 (Note: Start of session.)
- Repealed: 28 July 1863
Other legislation
Amends	Vagabonds Act 1572
Amended by	Continuance, etc. of Laws Act 1584; Continuance, etc. of Laws Act 1586; Continuance, etc. of Laws Act 1588; Continuance, etc. of Laws Act 1592; Continuance, etc. of Laws Act 1597; Continuance, etc. of Laws Act 1601; Continuance, etc. of Laws Act 1623; Continuance of Laws, etc. Act 1627
Repealed by	Statute Law Revision Act 1863
Relates to	Vagabonds Act 1572; Vagabonds Act 1597

Status: Repealed

Text of statute as originally enacted

The Poor Act 1575 (18 Eliz. 1. c. 3) was an act of the Parliament of England under Queen Elizabeth I. It was a part of the Tudor Poor Laws and a predecessor to the Elizabethan Poor Laws.

The act required parishes to create “a competent stock of wool, hemp, flax, iron and other stuff” for the poor to work on. It also created houses of correction where recalcitrant or careless workers could be forced to work and punished accordingly.

The act built substantially on the Vagabonds Act 1572 (14 Eliz. 1. c. 5), and combined, they formed the basis for the subsequent Elizabethan Poor Laws.

== Subsequent developments ==
The whole act was continued until the end of the next session of parliament by the Continuance, etc. of Laws Act 1584 (27 Eliz. 1. c. 11), the Continuance, etc. of Laws Act 1586 (29 Eliz. 1. c. 5), the Continuance, etc. of Laws Act 1588 (31 Eliz. 1. c. 10), the Continuance, etc. of Laws Act 1592 (35 Eliz. 1. c. 7), the Continuance, etc. of Laws Act 1597 (39 Eliz. 1. c. 18), the Continuance, etc. of Laws Act 1601 (43 Eliz. 1. c. 9) and the Continuance, etc. of Laws Act 1623 (21 Jas. 1. c. 28).

The act was amended by the Continuance, etc. of Laws Act 1592 (35 Eliz. 1. c. 7) to allow land to be given to the use of the poor.

So much of the act "as concerneth bailiffs begotten out of lawful matrimony" was continued until the end of the next session of parliament by the Continuance, etc. of Laws Act 1601 (43 Eliz. 1. c. 9).

The act "as concerneth Bastards begotten out of lawfull Matrimonie with this all Justice of the peace within their severall limits and pcincts and in their severall Sessions may doe and execute all things concerning that part of the said Statute that by Justice of the Peace in the severall Counties are by the said Statute lymited to be done" was continued by section 3 of the Continuance of Laws, etc. Act 1627 (3 Cha. 1 . c. 5).

The whole act was repealed by section 1 of, and the schedule to, the Statute Law Revision Act 1863 (26 & 27 Vict. c. 125), which came into force on 28 July 1863.
