= Continuance, etc. of Laws Act 1592 =

Act of the Parliament of England

- Act of Parliament
- Parliament of England
- Long title: An Act for the reviving, continuance, explanation and perfecting of divers statutes.
- Citation: 35 Eliz. 1. c. 7
- Territorial extent: England and Wales

Dates
- Royal assent: 10 April 1593
- Commencement: 18 February 1593 (Note: Start of session.)
- Repealed: 28 July 1863

Other legislation
- Amends: Maintenance of the Navy Act 1562; See § Revived and continued enactments
- Repeals/revokes: See § Repealed enactments
- Amended by: Hospitals for the Poor Act 1597; Continuance, etc. of Laws Act 1597
- Repealed by: Statute Law Revision Act 1863
- Relates to: See Expiring laws continuance acts

Status: Repealed

Text of statute as originally enacted

The Continuance, etc. of Laws Act 1592 (35 Eliz. 1. c. 7) was an act of the Parliament of England that revived, continued, amended and repealed various older acts.

== Provisions ==
Section 4 of the act decreased the penalty under section 12 of the Maintenance of the Navy Act 1562 (5 Eliz. 1. c. 5) for eating flesh on Flesh Days to 20 shillings or a month imprisonment.

Section 5 of the act permitted exportation of corn under section 17 of the Maintenance of the Navy Act 1562 (5 Eliz. 1. c. 5) when wheat does not exceed 20 shillings per quarter and imposed a customs duty of 2 shillings per quarter.

Section 8 of the act provided that anyone with land within five miles of Oxford must pay 4 pence per year towards the repair of bridges under the Road Repairs (Oxford) Act 1575 (18 Eliz. 1. c. 20).

Section 9 of the act provided that land may be given to the use of the por under the Poor Act 1575 (18 Eliz. 1. c. 3).

Section 10 of the act exempted certain ships from tonnage duty for Dover Haven under the Dover Harbour Act 1580 (23 Eliz. 1. c. 6) and Dover Harbour Act 1588 (31 Eliz. 1. c. 13).

Section 13 of the act provided that the nothing in the act would affect any existing license granted by the monarch for transporting corn at lower customs that provided under the act.

Section 14 of the act provided that export of corn may be prohibited by royal proclamation.

=== Revived and continued enactments ===
Section 1 of the act continued 26 enactments until the end of the next session of parliament.

Citation	Short title	Description	Extent of continuation
21 Hen. 8. c. 12	Manufacture of Cables, etc. Act 1529	In the first session of parliament begun in the city of London the third day of November in the one and twentieth year of the reign of our late sovereign lord of famous memory, King Henry the Eighth, and from thence adjourned and prorogued to the palace of Westminster, an act or statute was made, intituled, An act for the true making of cables, halters and ropes.	The whole act.
24 Hen. 8. c. 9	Killing Weanlings Act 1532	In the parliament holden upon prorogation at Westminster the fourth day of February in the four and twentieth year of the reign of the said King, one other act was then and there made, intituled, An act against killing of young beasts, called weanlings.	The whole act.
3 & 4 Edw. 6. c. 19	Buying Cattle Act 1549	In the session of a parliament ended at Westminster the first day of February in the fourth year of the reign of our late sovereign lord King Edward the Sixth, one act was made concerning the buying and selling of rother-beasts and cattle.	The whole act.
3 & 4 Edw. 6. c. 21	Butter and Cheese Act 1549	One other act was then and there likewise made, intituled, An act for the buying and selling of butter and cheese.	The whole act.
1 Eliz. 1. c. 17	Fisheries Act 1558	In the parliament begun at Westminster the three and twentieth day of January in the first year of the reign of the Queen's majesty that now is, and there continued by prorogation until the dissolution thereof, an act was then and there made, intituled, An act for the preservation of spawn and fry of fish.	The whole act.
5 Eliz. 1. c. 2	Tillage Act 1562	In the first session of parliament holden at Westminster the twelfth day of January in the fifth year of her Highness reign, one act was then and there made, intituled, An act for maintenance and increase of tillage.	The whole act.
5 Eliz. 1. c. 7	Importation Act 1562	One other act was then and there likewise made, intituled, An act for the avoiding of divers foreign wares, made by handicraftsmen beyond the seas.	The whole act.
5 Eliz. 1. c. 5	Maintenance of the Navy Act 1562	One other act was likewise then and there made, intituled, An act touching certain politick constitutions made for the maintenance of the navy.	The whole act.
8 Eliz. 1. c. 10	Bows Act 1566	In the last session of the parliament holden by prorogation at Westminster the last day of September in the eighth year of her Majesty's reign, one act was then and there made, intituled, An act for bowyers and the prices of bows.	The whole act.
13 Eliz. 1. c. 20	Benefices Act 1571	In the parliament begun and holden at Westminster in the second day of April in the thirteenth year of her Majesty's reign, there was one act and statute made for the avoiding of some leases in certain cases to be made of ecclesiastical promotions with cure, intituled, An act touching leases of benefices, and other ecclesiastical livings with cure.	The whole act.
13 Eliz. 1. c. 21	Purveyance Act 1571	One other act and statute made in the said parliament begun and holden at Westminster the said second day of April in the said thirteenth year, intituled, An act that purveyors may take grain, corn or victuals within five miles of Cambridge and Oxford in certain cases.	The whole act.
13 Eliz. 1. c. 8	Usury Act 1571	One other act was then and there made, intituled, An act against usury.	The whole act.
14 Eliz. 1. c. 11	Ecclesiastical Leases Act 1572	In the parliament holden at Westminster the eighth day of May in the fourteenth year of her Highness reign, there was one other act made, intituled, An act for the continuation, explanation, perfecting and enlarging of divers statutes; in which statute are contained divers branches, clauses and provisions touching and concerning the explanation, perfecting and enlarging of divers of the statutes before mentioned.	The whole act.
14 Eliz. 1. c. 5	Vagabonds Act 1572	In the first session of the parliament begun and holden at Westminster the eighth day of May in the fourteenth year of the Queen's highness reign that now is, and from thence continued by prorogation till the dissolution thereof, there was one other act made, intituled, An act for the punishment of vagabonds, and for the relief of the poor and impotent.	The whole act.
18 Eliz. 1. c. 3	Poor Act 1575	In the parliament holden at Westminster aforesaid in the eighteenth year of her Majesty's reign, there was one other act made, intituled, An act for setting the poor on work, and for the avoiding of idleness.	The whole act.
18 Eliz. 1. c. 20	Road Repairs (Oxford) Act 1575	One other act was then and there made, intituled, An act for the repairing and amending the bridges and highways near unto the city of Oxenford.	The whole act.
23 Eliz. 1. c. 6	Dover Harbour Act 1580	In the parliament holden at Westminster the sixteenth day of January in the three and twentieth year of her Majesty's reign, one act was made, intituled, An act for the repairing of Dover haven.	The whole act.
27 Eliz. 1. c. 11	Continuance, etc. of Laws Act 1584	In the parliament holden at Westminster the three and twentieth day of November in the seven and twentieth year of her Majesty's reign, one other act was made for the reviving, continuance, explanation and perfecting of divers statutes, in which are contained divers branches, provisions and clauses touching and concerning certain additions and alterations unto and of divers of the said former recited statutes, and other new provisions.	The whole act.
27 Eliz. 1. c. 7	Juries (No. 2) Act 1584	In the said parliament holden at Westminster the three and twentieth day of November in the seven and twentieth year of the Queen's majesty's reign that now is, there was an act made for the levying of issues lost by jurors.	The whole act.
27 Eliz. 1. c. 31 (Note: This is the citation in The Statutes of the Realm.) 27 Eliz. 1. c. 17 (Note: This is the citation in The Statutes at Large.)	Government of the City of Westminster Act 1584	One other act made, intituled, An act for the good government of the city or borough of Westminster.	The whole act.
2 & 3 Ed. 6. c. 10	Malt Act 1548	In the parliament holden at Westminster upon prorogation the fourth day of November in the second year of the reign of the late King of most famous memory, King Edward the Sixth, one act was made, intituled, An act for the true making of malt, which said statute was discontinued.	The whole act.
27 Eliz. 1. c. 14	Malt Act 1584	Another act made in the said parliament holden at Westminster in the said twenty-seventh year of the Queen's majesty's reign that now is, intituled, An act for the reviving of a former statute for the true making of malt, was revived and continued.	The whole act.
27 Eliz. 1. c. 24	Norfolk Coast Sea Defences Act 1584	One other act was then and there made, intituled, An act for the keeping of the sea-banks and sea-works in the county of Norfolk.	The whole act.
31 Eliz. 1. c. 8	Sale of Beer Act 1588	In the said parliament holden at Westminster the fourth day of February in the thirty-first year of the Queen's majesty's reign that now is, there was an act made, intituled, An act for the true gaging of vessels brought from beyond the seas, converted by brewers for the utterance and sale of ale and beer.	The whole act.
31 Eliz. 1. c. 13	Dover Harbour Act 1588	One other act was then and there made, intituled, An act for reviving and enlarging of a statute made in the twenty-third year of her Majesty's reign, for repairing of Dover Haven.	The whole act.
31 Eliz. 1. c. 5 Pr.	Relief of the City of Lincoln Act 1588	One other act was then and there made, intituled, An act for the relief of the city of Lincoln.	The whole act.

Section 7 of the act revived punishment of vagabonds by whipping under section 2 of the Vagabonds Act 1530 (22 Hen. 8).

Section 11 of the act revived and continued the Lyme Regis Pier Act 1584 (27 Eliz. 1) until the end of the next session of parliament.

Section 12 of the act made the Cloths Act 1584 (27 Eliz. 1. c. 17) perpetual.

=== Repealed enactments ===
Section 2 of the act repealed so much of the Tillage Act 1562 (5 Eliz. 1. c. 2) as "concern the earing, ploughing, using and keeping in tillage for ever, of such lands or grounds, or so much in quantity, as before the making of that statute had been eared or ploughed, and put in tillage in any one year, and so kept in tillage by the space of four years, at any time sithence the feast of St. George the martyr in the twentieth year of King Henry the Eighth".

Section 3 of the act repealed so much of the as "heretofore at any time was repealed, and all and every such branch and branches of the said statute as concern the sowing of flax or hemp, or the reviving of one statute concerning sowing of flax or hemp, made and provided in the parliament holden in the four and twentieth year of the reign of King Henry the Eighth". (Note: Flax and Hemp Act 1532 (24 Hen. 8. c. 4))

Section 6 of the act repealed so much of the Vagabonds Act 1572 (14 Eliz. 1. c. 5) and the Usury Act 1571 (18 Eliz. 1. c. 3) as "concerneth the punishment of vagabonds, by gaoling, boring through the ear, and death in the second degree, and every matter, clause, article and provision in the said statute contained concerning the same, shall so far forth only as they concern the same, from henceforth be repealed, cease and be utterly void; any thing in this statute contained to the contrary notwithstanding".

== Subsequent developments ==
The whole act was continued until the end of the next session of parliament by the Continuance, etc. of Laws Act 1597 (39 Eliz. 1. c. 18), except for provisions relating to the Importation Act 1562 (5 Eliz. 1. c. 7), the Maintenance of the Navy Act 1562 (5 Eliz. 1. c. 5), the Tillage Act 1562 (5 Eliz. 1. c. 2), the Caps Act 1571 (13 Eliz. 1. c. 19), the Vagabonds Act 1572 (14 Eliz. 1. c. 5), the Poor Act 1575 (18 Eliz. 1. c. 3), the Dover Harbour Act 1580 (23 Eliz. 1. c. 6) and the Disabled Soldiers Act 1592 (35 Eliz. 1. c. 4).

The whole act was repealed by section 1 of, and the schedule to, the Statute Law Revision Act 1863 (26 & 27 Vict. c. 125), which came into force on 28 July 1863.
