= Continuance, etc. of Laws Act 1588 =

Act of the Parliament of England

- Act of Parliament
- Parliament of England
- Long title: An Act for the continuance and perfecting of divers statutes.
- Citation: 31 Eliz. 1. c. 10
- Territorial extent: England and Wales

Dates
- Royal assent: 29 March 1589
- Commencement: 4 February 1589 (Note: Start of session.)
- Repealed: 15 August 1879

Other legislation
- Amends: See Expiring laws continuance acts
- Amended by: Statute Law Revision Act 1863
- Repealed by: Civil Procedure Acts Repeal Act 1879

Status: Repealed

Text of statute as originally enacted

The Continuance, etc. of Laws Act 1588 (31 Eliz. 1. c. 10) was an act of the Parliament of England that continued various older acts.

== Provisions ==
Section 3 of the act provided that section 4 of the Continuance, etc. of Laws Act 1586 (29 Eliz. 1. c. 5), which provided that defendants in cases under penal statutes could appear in court through an attorney rather than being physically present themselves, would only extend to natural-born subjects or denizens.

=== Revived and continued enactments ===
Section 1 of the act continued 17 enactments until the end of the next session of parliament.

Citation	Short title	Description	Extent of continuation
21 Hen. 8. c. 12	Manufacture of Cables, etc. Act 1529	In the first session of parliament begun in the city of London the third day of November in the one and twentieth year of the reign of our late sovereign lord of famous memory King Henry the Eighth, and from thence adjourned and prorogued to the palace of Westminster, an act or statute was made, intituled, An act for the true making of cables, halters and ropes.	The whole act.
24 Hen. 8. c. 9	Killing Weanlings Act 1532	In the parliament holden upon prorogation at Westminster the fourth day of February in the year and twentieth year of the reign of the said King, one other act was then and there made, intituled, An act against killing of young beasts, called weanlings	The whole act.
3 & 4 Edw. 6. c. 19	Buying Cattle Act 1549	In the session of a parliament ended at Westminster the first day of February in the fourth year of the reign of our late sovereign lord King Edward the Sixth, one act was made concerning the buying and selling of rother beasts and cattle.	The whole act.
3 & 4 Edw. 6. c. 21	Butter and Cheese Act 1549	One other act was then and there likewise made, intituled, An act for the buying and selling of butter and cheese.	The whole act.
1 Eliz. 1. c. 17	Fisheries Act 1558	In the parliament begun at Westminster the three and twentieth day of January in the first year of the reign of the Queen's majesty that now is, and there continued by prorogation until the dissolution thereof, one act was then and there made, intituled, An act for the preservation of spawn and fry of fish.	The whole act.
5 El. c. 2	Tillage Act 1562	In the first session of parliament holden at Westminster the twelfth day of January in the fifth year of her Highness reign, one act was then and there made, intituled, An act for maintenance and increase of tillage.	The whole act.
5 Eliz. 1. c. 7	Importation Act 1562	One other act was then there likewise made, intituled, An act for the avoiding of divers foreign wares made by handicraftsmen beyond the seas.	The whole act.
8 Eliz. 1. c. 10	Bows Act 1566	In the last session of the parliament holden by prorogation at Westminster the last day of September in the eighth year of her Majesty's reign, one act was then and there made, intituled, An act for bowers, and the prices of bows.	The whole act.
13 Eliz. 1. c. 20	Benefices Act 1571	In the parliament begun and holden at Westminster the second day of April in the thirteenth year of her Majesty's reign, there was one act and statute made for the avoiding of some leases in certain cases to be made of ecclesiastical promotions with cure, intituled, An act touching leases of benefices, and other ecclesiastical livings with cure.	The whole act.
13 Eliz. 1. c. 21	Purveyance Act 1571	One other act and statute made in the said parliament begun and holden at Westminster the second day of April in the said thirteenth year, intituled, An act that purveyors may take grain, corn or victuals within five miles of Cambridge and Oxford in certain cases.	The whole act.
13 Eliz. 1. c. 8	Usury Act 1571	One other act was then and there made, intituled, An act against usury.	The whole act.
14 Eliz. 1. c. 11	Ecclesiastical Leases Act 1572	In the parliament holden at Westminster the eighth day of May in the fourteenth year of her Highness reign, there was one other act made, intituled, An act for the continuation, explanation, perfecting and enlarging of divers statutes; in which statute are contained divers branches, clauses and provisions touching and concerning the explanation, perfecting and enlarging of divers of the statutes before mentioned.	The whole act.
14 Eliz. 1. c. 5	Vagabonds Act 1572	In the first session of the parliament begun and holden at Westminster the eighth day of May in the fourteenth year of the Queen's highness reign that now is, and from thence continued by prorogation till the dissolution thereof, there was one other act made, intituled, An act for the punishment of vagabonds, and for the relief of the poor and impotent.	The whole act.
18 Eliz. 1. c. 3	Poor Act 1575	In the parliament holden at Westminster aforesaid in the eighteenth year of her Majesty's reign, there was one other act made, intituled, An act for the setting of the poor on work, and for the avoiding of idleness.	The whole act.
27 Eliz. 1. c. 11	Continuance, etc. of Laws Act 1584	In the parliament holden at Westminster the three and twentieth day of November in the seven and twentieth year of her Majesty's reign, one other act was made for the continuance, explanation and perfecting of divers statutes, in which are contained divers branches, provisions and clauses touching and concerning certain additions and alterations, unto and of divers of the said former recited statutes, and other new provisions.	The whole act.
27 Eliz. 1. c. 7	Juries (No. 2) Act 1584	In the said parliament holden at Westminster the three and twentieth day of November in the seven and twentieth year of the Queen's majesty's reign that now is, there was an act made for the reviving of divers lost by jurors.	The whole act.
27 Eliz. 1. c. 31 (Note: This is the citation in The Statutes of the Realm.) 27 Eliz. 1. c. 17 (Note: This is the citation in The Statutes at Large.)	Government of the City of Westminster Act 1584	In the parliament holden at Westminster the three and twentieth day of November in the seven and twentieth year of the Queen's majesty's reign that now is, there was one other act made, intituled, An act for the good government of the city or borough of Westminster.	The whole act.

Section 2 of the act continued the Maintenance of the Navy Act 1562 (5 Eliz. 1. c. 5) until the end of the next session of parliament.

== Subsequent developments ==
The whole act, except section 3, was repealed by section 1 of, and the schedule to, the Statute Law Revision Act 1863 (26 & 27 Vict. c. 125), which came into force on 28 July 1863.

The whole act was repealed by section 2 of, and part I of the schedule to, the Civil Procedure Acts Repeal Act 1879 (42 & 43 Vict. c. 59), which came into force on 15 August 1879.
