= Ecclesiastical Leases Act 1572 =

Act of the Parliament of England

Ecclesiastical Leases Act 1572 (Note: The citation of this act by this short title was authorised by section 5 of, and the second schedule to, the Statute Law Revision Act 1948. Due to the repeal of those provisions, it is now authorised by section 19(2) of the Interpretation Act 1978.)
- Act of Parliament
- Parliament of England
- Long title: An Acte for the continuacion explanacion perfiting and enlardging of divers Estatutes. (Note: These words are printed against this act in the second column of the second schedule to the Statute Law Revision Act 1948, which is headed "Title".)
- Citation: 14 Eliz. 1. c. 11
- Territorial extent: England and Wales

Dates
- Royal assent: 30 June 1572
- Commencement: 8 May 1572 (Note: Start of session.)
- Repealed: 19 November 1998
Other legislation
Amends	Continuance of Laws Act 1571; See § Revived and continued enactments
Amended by	Continuance of Laws Act 1571; Continuance, etc. of Laws Act 1584; Continuance, etc. of Laws Act 1586; Continuance, etc. of Laws Act 1588; Continuance, etc. of Laws Act 1592; Continuance, etc. of Laws Act 1623; Continuance of Laws, etc. Act 1627; Ecclesiastical Leases Act 1800; Residence on Benefices, etc. (England) Act 1817; Statute Law Revision Act 1863; Statute Law Revision Act 1888; Charities Act 1960
Repealed by	Statute Law (Repeals) Act 1998
Relates to	Ecclesiastical Leases Act 1571; Ecclesiastical Leases Act 1575; See Expiring laws continuance acts

Status: Repealed

Text of statute as originally enacted

Revised text of statute as amended

The Ecclesiastical Leases Act 1572 (14 Eliz. 1. c. 11) was an act of the Parliament of England.

== Provisions ==
Section 1 of the act repealed section 5 of the Continuance of Laws Act 1571 (13 Eliz. 1. c. 25), which had provided that the Importation Act 1562 (5 Eliz. 1. c. 7) would not affect intercourse under treaties signed by the Queen.

Section 2 of the act repealed the words "so soone as it or any part thereof shall come to any Possession or Use above forbydden, or" in the Benefices Act 1571 (13 Eliz. 1. c. 20).

Section 3 of the act provided that all future bonds, contracts, promises, and covenants enabling persons to enjoy ecclesiastical promotions or their profits would be legally treated as leases with the same force and validity as if they were formal leases of such benefices.

Section 4 of the act declared that any leases, bonds, promises, and covenants concerning benefices and ecclesiastical livings with cure made by curates would have no greater force, validity, or continuance than if they had been made by the beneficed person himself.

Section 5 of the act provided that section 2 of the Ecclesiastical Leases Act 1571 (13 Eliz. 1. c. 10) would not extend to houses in cities or towns corporate.

Section 6 of the act provided that all money recovered for dilapidations must be used within two years for buildings and repairs related to those dilapidations, with a penalty of double the amount forfeited to the Queen for non-compliance.

Section 7 of the act provided that no lease shall be made in reversion, without reserving customary yearly rent, without charging the lessee with repairs, for longer than forty years, nor shall houses be alienated without providing equivalent land of equal value to the colleges, houses, or corporate bodies involved.

=== Revived and continued enactments ===
Section 8 of the act continued 13 enactments until the end of the next session of parliament.

Citation	Short title	Description	Extent of continuation
24 Hen. 8. c. 7	Killing Calves Act 1532	In the parliament holden upon prorogation at Westminster the fourth day of February in the four and twentieth year of the reign of the late King Henry the Eighth, one act was there made, intituled, An act to continue and renew the act made against killing of calves.	The whole act.
24 Hen. 8. c. 9	Killing Weanlings Act 1532	one other act, intituled, An act against killing of young beasts, called wainlings	The whole act.
3 & 4 Edw. 6. c. 19	Buying Cattle Act 1549	In the session of a parliament ended at Westminster on the first day of February in the fourth year of the reign of our late sovereign lord King Edward the Sixth, one act was made concerning the buying and selling of rother beasts.	The whole act.
3 & 4 Edw. 6. c. 21	Butter and Cheese Act 1549	One other act was then and there likewise made, intituled, An act for the buying and selling of butter and cheese.	The whole act.
5 Eliz. 1. c. 2	Tillage Act 1562	An act was made in the first session of parliament holden in the fifth year of the Queen's majesty's reign, intituled, An act for the maintenance and increase of tillage.	The whole act.
1 Eliz. 1. c. 17	Fisheries Act 1558	In the parliament begun at Westminster on the twelfth day of January in the fifth year of the reign of the Queen's majesty that now is, and there continued by prorogation until the dissolution thereof, one act was then and there made, intituled, An act for the preservation of spawn and fry of fish.	The whole act.
5 Eliz. 1. c. 7	Importation Act 1562	In the first session of the parliament begun and holden at Westminster in the fifth year of the reign of our sovereign lady the Queen's majesty that now is, and from thence continued by prorogation until the dissolution thereof, one act was then and there made, intituled, An act for the putting of divers foreign wares made by handicraftsmen beyond the seas.	The whole act.
5 Eliz. 1. c. 9	Perjury Act 1562	One other act, intituled, An act for the punishment of such persons as should procure or commit any wilful perjury.	The whole act.
8 Eliz. 1. c. 10	Bows Act 1566	in the last session of the same parliament holden by prorogation at Westminster in the eighth year of the reign of the Queen's most excellent majesty that now is, one act was then and there made, intituled, An act for bowyers, and the prices of bows.	The whole act.
8 Eliz. 1. c. 15	Preservation of Grain Act 1566	One other act was then made, intituled, An act for the preservation of grain.	The whole act.
13 Eliz. 1. c. 5	Fraudulent Conveyances Act 1571	In the parliament begun and holden at Westminster the second day of April in the thirteenth year of the reign of our said sovereign lady the Queen, one act and statute was then and there made, for the avoiding and abolishing of feigned, covenous and fraudulent feoffments, gifts, grants, alienations, conveyances, bonds, suits, judgments and executions, intituled, An act against fraudulent deeds, gifts, grants, alienations, &c.	The whole act.
13 Eliz. 1. c. 20	Benefices Act 1571	In the said parliament begun and holden at Westminster the said second day of April, there was also one other act and statute made for the avoiding of leases to be made of such offences to be made of ecclesiastical promotions with cure, intituled, An act touching leases of benefices and ecclesiastical livings with cure.	The whole act.
13 Eliz. 1. c. 21	Purveyance Act 1571	One other act and statute made in the said parliament begun and holden at Westminster the said second day of April in the said thirteenth year, intituled, An that purveyors may take grain, corn or victuals within five miles of Cambridge and Oxford, in certain cases.	The whole act.

== Subsequent developments ==
The act was continued until the end of the next session of parliament by the Continuance, etc. of Laws Act 1584 (27 Eliz. 1. c. 11), the Continuance, etc. of Laws Act 1586 (29 Eliz. 1. c. 5), the Continuance, etc. of Laws Act 1588 (31 Eliz. 1. c. 10), the Continuance, etc. of Laws Act 1592 (35 Eliz. 1. c. 7) and the Continuance, etc. of Laws Act 1623 (21 Jas. 1. c. 28).

So much of the act "as relates to spiritual persons holding of farms, and to leases of benefices and livings, and to buying and selling, and to residence of spiritual persons on their benefices" was repealed by section 1 of the Residence on Benefices, etc. (England) Act 1817 (57 Geo. 3. c. 99), which came into force on 10 July 1817.

Sections 1–4 and 8 of the act were repealed by section 1 of, and the schedule to, the Statute Law Revision Act 1863 (26 & 27 Vict. c. 125), which came into force on 28 July 1863. The words "masters or guardians of any hospital" and the words "and hospitals" were repealed (by virtue of section 48(2)) under schedule 7 to the Charities Act 1960 (8 & 9 Eliz. 2. c. 58)).

The whole act was repealed by section 1(1) of, and group 1 of part II of schedule 1 to, the Statute Law (Repeals) Act 1998, which came into force on 19 November 1998.
