= Importation Act 1562 =

Act of the Parliament of England

- Act of Parliament
- Parliament of England
- Long title: An Act avoiding divers foreign Wares made by Handicraftsmen beyond the Seas.
- Citation: 5 Eliz. 1. c. 7
- Territorial extent: England and Wales

Dates
- Royal assent: 10 April 1563
- Commencement: 24 June 1563 (Note: The Feast of the Nativity of Saint John the Baptist.)
- Repealed: 24 June 1822
Other legislation
Amended by	Continuance of Laws Act 1571; Ecclesiastical Leases Act 1572; Continuance, etc. of Laws Act 1584; Continuance, etc. of Laws Act 1586; Continuance, etc. of Laws Act 1588; Continuance, etc. of Laws Act 1592; Continuance, etc. of Laws Act 1592; Continuance, etc. of Laws Act 1597; Continuance, etc. of Laws Act 1601; Continuance of Laws, etc. Act 1627; Importation, etc. Act 1819
Repealed by	Repeal of Acts Concerning Importation Act 1822

Status: Repealed

Text of statute as originally enacted

The Importation Act 1562 (5 Eliz. 1. c. 7) was an act of the Parliament of England passed during the reign of Elizabeth I that banned the importation of manufactured goods (mostly those used in military equipment) from select countries. The aim of the act was to provide a positive balance of trade and to increase domestic employment.

== Subsequent developments ==
The whole act was continued until the end of the next session of parliament by the Continuance of Laws Act 1571 (13 Eliz. 1. c. 25), the Ecclesiastical Leases Act 1572 (14 Eliz. 1. c. 11), the Continuance, etc. of Laws Act 1584 (27 Eliz. 1. c. 11), the Continuance, etc. of Laws Act 1586 (29 Eliz. 1. c. 5), the Continuance, etc. of Laws Act 1588 (31 Eliz. 1. c. 10), the Continuance, etc. of Laws Act 1592 (35 Eliz. 1. c. 7), the Continuance, etc. of Laws Act 1597 (39 Eliz. 1. c. 18) and the Continuance, etc. of Laws Act 1601 (43 Eliz. 1. c. 9).

The whole act was continued until the end of the first session of the next parliament by section 3 of the Continuance of Laws, etc. Act 1627 (3 Cha. 1 . c. 5).

The act was amended by the Importation, etc. Act 1819 (59 Geo. 3. c. 73).

The whole act was repealed by section 1 of the Repeal of Acts Concerning Importation Act 1822 (3 Geo. 4. c. 41).
