= Ecclesiastical Leases Act 1575 =

Act of the Parliament of England

Ecclesiastical Leases Act 1575 (Note: The citation of this act by this short title was authorised by section 5 of, and the second schedule to, the Statute Law Revision Act 1948. Due to the repeal of those provisions, it is now authorised by section 19(2) of the Interpretation Act 1978.)
- Act of Parliament
- Parliament of England
- Long title: An Acte for Thexplanacion of the Statutes entytuled againste the defeating of Dilapidacions, and againste Leases to bee made of Spirituall Promocions in some Respectes. (Note: These words are printed against this act in the second column of the second schedule to the Statute Law Revision Act 1948, which is headed "Title".)
- Citation: 18 Eliz. 1. c. 11
- Territorial extent: England and Wales

Dates
- Royal assent: 15 March 1576
- Commencement: 8 February 1576 (Note: Start of session.)
- Repealed: 19 November 1998
Other legislation
Amends	Ecclesiastical Leases Act 1571
Amended by	Continuance, etc. of Laws Act 1623; Continuance of Laws, etc. Act 1627; Residence on Benefices, etc. (England) Act 1817; Statute Law Revision Act 1863; Statute Law Revision Act 1888
Repealed by	Statute Law (Repeals) Act 1998
Relates to	Ecclesiastical Leases Act 1571; Ecclesiastical Leases Act 1572

Status: Repealed

Text of statute as originally enacted

Revised text of statute as amended

The Ecclesiastical Leases Act 1575 (18 Eliz. 1. c. 11) was an act of the Parliament of England.

== Subsequent developments ==
The act was continued until the end of the next session of parliament by the Continuance of Laws, etc. Act 1623 (21 Jas. 1. c. 28), which came into force on 19 February 1624.

So much of the act "as relates to spiritual persons holding of farms, and to leases of benefices and livings, and to buying and selling, and to residence of spiritual persons on their benefices" was repealed by section 1 of the Residence on Benefices, etc. (England) Act 1817 (57 Geo. 3. c. 99), which came into force on 10 July 1817.

Section 5 of the act was repealed by section 1 of, and the schedule to, the Statute Law Revision Act 1863 (26 & 27 Vict. c. 125), which came into force on 28 July 1863.

The whole act was repealed by section 1(1) of, and group 1 of part II of schedule 1 to, the Statute Law (Repeals) Act 1998, which came into force on 19 November 1998.
