= Treason Act 1586 =

Act of the Parliament of England

- Act of Parliament
- Parliament of England
- Long title: An act concerning errors in records of attainders of high treason.
- Citation: 29 Eliz. 1. c. 2
- Territorial extent: England and Wales

Dates
- Royal assent: 23 March 1587
- Commencement: 15 October 1586 (Note: Start of session.)
- Repealed: 28 July 1863

Other legislation
- Repealed by: Statute Law Revision Act 1863

Status: Repealed

Text of statute as originally enacted

The Treason Act 1586 or the Errors in Attainders Act 1586 (29 Eliz. 1. c. 2) was an act of the Parliament of England. Its long title was "An act concerning errors in records of attainders of high treason." It stated that where a person had been executed for high treason, their conviction was not to be posthumously overturned or "reversed" at the suit of their heirs. This was because (according to the act's preamble) "through corruption or negligent keeping, the records of attainders of treason happen many times to be impaired, blemished or otherwise to be defective." The act was intended to prevent people from taking advantage of this.

The act did not apply to any writ of error which had already been brought, or affect any record which had already been reversed.

== See also ==
- High treason in the United Kingdom
- Treason Act

== Subsequent developments ==
The whole act was repealed by section 1 of, and the schedule to, the Statute Law Revision Act 1863 (26 & 27 Vict. c. 125), which came into force on 28 July 1863.
