= Continuance of Laws Act 1571 =

Act of the Parliament of England

- Act of Parliament
- Parliament of England
- Long title: An Act for the Reviving and Continuance of certain Statutes.
- Citation: 13 Eliz. 1. c. 25
- Territorial extent: England and Wales

Dates
- Royal assent: 29 May 1571
- Commencement: 2 April 1571 (Note: Start of session.)
- Repealed: 28 July 1863

Other legislation
- Amends: See § Revived and continued enactments
- Amended by: Ecclesiastical Leases Act 1572
- Repealed by: Statute Law Revision Act 1863
- Relates to: See Expiring laws continuance acts

Status: Repealed

Text of statute as originally enacted

The Continuance of Laws Act 1571 (13 Eliz. 1. c. 25) was an act of the Parliament of England that continued and revived various older acts.

== Provisions ==
=== Revived and continued enactments ===
Section 1 of the act revived and made perpetual 5 enactments.

Citation	Short title	Description	Extent of revival
23 Hen. 8. c. 17	Winding of Wool Act 1531	In the parliament begun and holden in at London the third day of November in the one and twentieth year of the reign of our most dread sovereign lord of famous memory, King Henry the Eighth, and from thence adjourned to Westminster, and there holden and continued by divers prorogations until the dissolution thereof, an act was made for the true winding of wools.	The whole act.
23 Hen. 8. c. 3	Attaints Act 1531	In the same parliament one other act was made and established for attaints to be sued for the punishment of perjury upon untrue verdicts.	The whole act.
35 Hen. 8. c. 17	Preservation of Woods Act 1543	In the parliament holden at Westminster in the thirty-fifth year of the reign of our said late sovereign lord King Henry the Eighth, one act was made for the preservation of woods.	The whole act.
5 & 6 Edw. 6. c. 14	Forestallers Act 1551	At the session of a parliament by prorogation holden at Westminster the three and twentieth day of January in the fifth year of the reign of our late sovereign lord King Edward the Sixth, one act was then and there made against regrators, forestallers and ingrossers..	The whole act.
2 & 3 Ph. & M. c. 3	Increase of Cattle Act 1555	At a parliament begun and holden at Westminster the twenty-first day of October in the second and third years of the reigns of the late King Philip and Queen Mary, and there continued until the dissolution of the same, one act was made and established there for keeping of milch-kine, and for the breeding and rearing of calves.	The whole act.

Section 2 of the act revived and continued 6 enactments until the end of the next session of parliament.

Citation	Short title	Description	Extent of continuation
24 Hen. 8. c. 9	Killing Weanlings Act 1532	In the said parliament begun and holden at London on the third day of November in the said one and twentieth year of the reign of the said late King Henry the Eighth, and from thence adjourned to Westminster, and there continued by prorogation until the dissolution thereof, one act was there made, intituled, An act against the killing of young beasts, called weynlings.	The whole act.
3 & 4 Edw. 6. c. 19	Buying Cattle Act 1549	In the session of a parliament ended at Westminster the first day of February in the fourth year of the reign of our said late sovereign lord King Edward the Sixth, one act was made concerning the buying and selling of rother-beasts.	The whole act.
3 & 4 Edw. 6. c. 21	Butter and Cheese Act 1549	One other act was then and there likewise made intituled, An act for buying and selling of butter and cheese.	The whole act.
5 Eliz. 1. c. 2	Tillage Act 1562	An act was made in the first session of the said parliament, holden in the fifth year of the Queen's majesty's reign, intituled, An act for the maintenance and increase of tillage.	The whole act.
5 Eliz. 1. c. 3	Poor Act 1562	One other act then also made, intituled, An act for the relief of the poor.	The whole act.
1 Eliz. 1. c. 17	Fisheries Act 1558	In the parliament begun and holden at Westminster in the twenty-third day of January in the first year of the reign of the Queen's majesty that now is, and there continued by prorogation until the dissolution thereof, one act was there made and established, intituled, An act for the preservation of spawn and fry of fish.	The whole act.

Section 3 of the act extended the Gaols Act 1531 (23 Hen. 8. c. 3), as continued for ten years by the Gaols Act 1553 (1 Mar. Sess. 2. c. 14) and enlarged by the Gaols Act 1562 (5 Eliz. 1. c. 24), to the County of Cambridge and further continued the amended act for ten years.

Section 4 of the act revived and continued 4 enactments until the end of the next session of parliament.

Citation	Short title	Description	Extent of continuation
5 Eliz. 1. c. 7	Importation Act 1562	In the first session of the parliament begun and holden at Westminster in the said fifth year of the reign of our sovereign lady the Queen's majesty that now is, and from thence continued by prorogation until the dissolution thereof, one act was then and there made, intituled, An act for the avoiding of divers foreign wares made by handicraftsmen beyond the seas.	The whole act.
5 Eliz. 1. c. 9	Perjury Act 1562	One other act, intituled, An act for the punishment of such persons as should procure or commit any wilful perjury.	The whole act.
8 Eliz. 1. c. 10	Bows Act 1566	In the last session of the same parliament holden by prorogation at Westminster in the eighth year of the reign of the Queen's most excellent majesty that now is, one act was then and there made, intituled, An act for bowyers, and the prices of bows.	The whole act.
8 Eliz. 1. c. 15	Preservation of Grain Act 1566	One other act then made, intituled, An act for the preservation of grain	The whole act.

Section 5 of the act provided that the Importation Act 1562 (5 Eliz. 1. c. 7) would not affect intercourse under treaties signed by the Queen.

Section 6 of the act provided that, from 20 June 1571, all woodlands inclosed by the Preservation of Woods Act 1543 (35 Hen. 8. c. 17) would be preserved for 2 years longer than had been provided. Section 6 of the act also provided that, from 20 June 1571, it would be illegal for cattle to be kept on these woodlands for 5 years from any sale and limited this to calves and colts only to 6 years from sale for woods under the age of 14 years and to 8 years from sale for woods over the age of 14 years.

Section 7 of the act provided that all badgers of corn would need to be licensed under the Corn, etc. Act 1562 (5 Eliz. 1. c. 12).

Section 8 of the act provided that the Forestallers Act 1551 (5 & 6 Edw. 6. c. 14) (Note: The margin note incorrectly cites this as "c. 11".) would not extend to wines, oils, sugars, spices, currants or foreign victuals brought from overseas.

== Subsequent developments ==
Section 5 of the act was repealed by section 1 of the Ecclesiastical Leases Act 1572 (14 Eliz. 1. c. 11).

The whole act was repealed by section 1 of, and the schedule to, the Statute Law Revision Act 1863 (26 & 27 Vict. c. 125), which came into force on 28 July 1863.
