= Ecclesiastical Leases Act 1571 =

Act of the Parliament of England

Ecclesiastical Leases Act 1571 (Note: The citation of this act by this short title was authorised by section 5 of, and the second schedule to, the Statute Law Revision Act 1948. Due to the repeal of those provisions, it is now authorised by section 19(2) of the Interpretation Act 1978.)
- Act of Parliament
- Parliament of England
- Long title: An Acte against Fraudes, defeating Remedies for Dilapidations, &c. (Note: These words are printed against this act in the second column of the second schedule to the Statute Law Revision Act 1948, which is headed "Title".)
- Citation: 13 Eliz. 1. c. 10
- Territorial extent: England and Wales

Dates
- Royal assent: 29 May 1571
- Commencement: 2 April 1571 (Note: Start of session.)
- Repealed: 19 November 1998
Other legislation
Amended by	Ecclesiastical Leases Act 1572; Hospitals for the Poor Act 1572; Continuance, etc. of Laws Act 1603; Continuance, etc. of Laws Act 1623; Ecclesiastical Leases Act 1800; Statute Law Revision Act 1888; Charities Act 1960
Repealed by	Statute Law (Repeals) Act 1998
Relates to	Ecclesiastical Leases Act 1572; Ecclesiastical Leases Act 1575

Status: Repealed

Text of statute as originally enacted

Revised text of statute as amended

The Ecclesiastical Leases Act 1571 (13 Eliz. 1. c. 10) was an act of the Parliament of England that provided that conveyances of estates by the masters, fellows, any college dean to anyone for anything other than a term of 21 years, or three lives (meaning three particular lives, such as to a person and then two of his heirs), ‘shall be utterly void’. The act was fought over in the Earl of Oxford's case (1615) which decided the precedence between the two main branches of the non-criminal law, which had mainly separate courts until the late 19th century.

== Subsequent developments ==
The act was continued until the end of the first session of the next parliament by the Continuance, etc. of Laws Act 1603 (1 Jas. 1. c. 25) and the Continuance, etc. of Laws Act 1623 (21 Jas. 1. c. 28).

The whole act was repealed by section 1(1) of, and group 1 of part II of schedule 1 to, the Statute Law (Repeals) Act 1998, which came into force on 19 November 1998.
