= Hospitals for the Poor Act 1572 =

Act of the Parliament of England

Hospitals for the Poor Act 1572 (Note: The citation of this act by this short title was authorised by section 5 of, and the second schedule to, the Statute Law Revision Act 1948. Due to the repeal of those provisions, it is now authorised by section 19(2) of the Interpretation Act 1978.)
- Act of Parliament
- Parliament of England
- Long title: An Acte for the assurance of Gyftes Grauntes, &c. made and to bee made for the Relyef of the Poore in Hospitalles, &c. (Note: These words are printed against this act in the second column of the second schedule to the Statute Law Revision Act 1948, which is headed "Title".)
- Citation: 14 Eliz. 1. c. 14
- Territorial extent: England Wales

Dates
- Royal assent: 30 June 1572
- Commencement: 8 May 1572 (Note: Start of session.)
- Repealed: 1 January 1961

Other legislation
- Amends: Ecclesiastical Leases Act 1571
- Repealed by: Charities Act 1960

Status: Repealed

Text of statute as originally enacted

The Hospitals for the Poor Act 1572 (14 Eliz. 1. c. 14) was an act of the Parliament of England.

== Subsequent developments ==
The whole act was repealed by section 39(1) of, and schedule 5 to, the Charities Act 1960 (8 & 9 Eliz. 2. c. 58), which came into force on 1 January 1961.
