= Statute of Stabbing =

Act of Parliament of England

Statute of Stabbing 1603
- Act of Parliament
- Parliament of England
- Long title: An Act to take away the Benefit of Clergy from some kind of Manslaughter.
- Citation: 1 Jas. 1. c. 8
- Territorial extent: England and Wales

Dates
- Royal assent: 7 July 1604
- Commencement: 16 August 1604 (Note: Section 1. 40 days after end of session)
- Repealed: 1 July 1828 (England and Wales); 1 March 1829 (India)
Other legislation
Amended by	Continuance of Laws, etc. Act 1627
Repealed by	Offences Against the Person Act 1828 (England and Wales); Criminal Law (India) Act 1828 (India)

Status: Repealed

Text of statute as originally enacted

The Statute of Stabbing (1 Jas. 1. c. 8) was an act of the Parliament of England enacted during the reign of James I that provided that if any person stabbed "any person that hath not any weapon drawn or that hath not then first stricken the party", and they died within six months as a result, was to suffer the death penalty without being permitted benefit of clergy.

Under the statute, killings subject to benefit of clergy were called manslaughters and required that a defendant prove a "sudden quarrel" or provocation. Deaths resulting from armed attacks that had been planned were called murders.

== Subsequent developments ==
The whole act was continued until the end of the first session of the next parliament by section 3 of the Continuance of Laws, etc. Act 1627 (3 Cha. 1 . c. 5).

The whole act was repealed for England and Wales by section 1 of the Offences against the Person Act 1828 (9 Geo. 4. c. 31) and for India by section 125 of the Criminal Law (India) Act 1828 (9 Geo. 4. c. 74).
