= List of acts of the Parliament of England from 1586 =

This is a list of acts of the Parliament of England for the year 1586.

For acts passed during the period 1707–1800, see the list of acts of the Parliament of Great Britain. See also the list of acts of the Parliament of Scotland, and the list of acts of the Parliament of Ireland.

For acts passed from 1801 onwards, see the list of acts of the Parliament of the United Kingdom. For acts of the devolved parliaments and assemblies in the United Kingdom, see the list of acts of the Scottish Parliament, the list of acts of the Northern Ireland Assembly, and the list of acts and measures of Senedd Cymru; see also the list of acts of the Parliament of Northern Ireland.

For medieval statutes, etc. that are not considered to be acts of Parliament, see the list of English statutes.

See also the List of ordinances and acts of the Parliament of England, 1642–1660 for ordinances and acts passed by the Long Parliament and other bodies without royal assent, and which were not considered to be valid legislation following the Restoration in 1660.

The number shown after each act's title is its chapter number. Acts are cited using this number, preceded by the years of the reign during which the relevant parliamentary session was held; thus the Union with Ireland Act 1800 is cited as "39 & 40 Geo. 3. c. 67", meaning the 67th act passed during the session that started in the 39th year of the reign of George III and which finished in the 40th year of that reign. The modern convention is to use Arabic numerals in citations (thus "41 Geo. 3" rather than "41 Geo. III"). Acts of the last session of the Parliament of Great Britain and the first session of the Parliament of the United Kingdom are both cited as "41 Geo. 3".

Acts passed by the Parliament of England did not have a short title; however, some of these acts have subsequently been given a short title by acts of the Parliament of the United Kingdom, such as the Short Titles Act 1896 (59 & 60 Vict. c. 14).

Acts passed by the Parliament of England were deemed to have come into effect on the first day of the session in which they were passed. Because of this, the years given in the list below may in fact be the year before a particular act was passed.

== 29 Eliz. 1 ==
The 6th Parliament of Queen Elizabeth I, which met from 15 October 1586 until 23 March 1587.

This session was traditionally cited as 29 Eliz., 29 Elz., 29 El., 28 Eliz. 1, 28 Eliz., 28 & 29 Eliz. 1, 28 & 29 Eliz. or 28 & 29 Elz..

=== Public acts ===
Short title	Citation	Royal assent
Long title
Attainder of Lord Paget and others Act 1586 (repealed)	29 Eliz. 1. c. 1 (Note: This is the citation in The Statutes of the Realm.); 28 & 29 Eliz. 1. c. 1 (Note: This is the citation in The Statutes at Large.)	23 March 1587
An Acte for the Confirmation of the Attaynders of Thomas late Lord Paget and others. (Repealed by Statute Law (Repeals) Act 1977 (c. 18))
Treason Act 1586 or the Errors in Attainders Act 1586 (repealed)	29 Eliz. 1. c. 2; 28 & 29 Eliz. 1. c. 2	23 March 1587
An Act concerning Errors in Records of Attainders of High Treason. (Repealed by Statute Law Revision Act 1863 (26 & 27 Vict. c. 125))
Assurances by Certain Traitors Act 1586 (repealed)	29 Eliz. 1. c. 3; 28 & 29 Eliz. 1. c. 3	23 March 1587
An Act to avoid fraudulent assurances made in certain cases by traitors. (Repealed by Statute Law Revision Act 1863 (26 & 27 Vict. c. 125))
Sheriff's Poundage, etc. Act 1586 (repealed)	29 Eliz. 1. c. 4; 28 & 29 Eliz. 1. c. 4	23 March 1587
An Act to prevent extortion in sheriffs, under-sheriffs and bailiffs of franchises or liberties, in cases of execution. (Repealed by Sheriffs Act 1887 (50 & 51 Vict. c. 55))
Continuance, etc. of Laws Act 1586 (repealed)	29 Eliz. 1. c. 5; 28 & 29 Eliz. 1. c. 5	23 March 1587
An Act for the continuance and perfecting of divers statutes. (Repealed by Civil Procedure Acts Repeal Act 1879 (42 & 43 Vict. c. 59))
Religion Act 1586 (repealed)	29 Eliz. 1. c. 6; 28 & 29 Eliz. 1. c. 6	23 March 1587
An Act for the more speedy and due Execution of certain Branches of the Statute made in the twenty-third Year of the Queen's Majesty's Reign, intituled, "An Act to retain the Queen's Majesty's Subjects in their due Obedience." (Note: Religion Act 1580 (23 Eliz. 1. c. 1)) (Repealed for England and Wales by Religious Disabilities Act 1846 (9 & 10 Vict. c. 59) and for the Isle of Man by Statute Law Revision (Isle of Man) Act 1991 (c. 61))
Taxation Act 1586 (repealed)	29 Eliz. 1. c. 7; 28 & 29 Eliz. 1. c. 7	23 March 1587
An Act for one subsidy by the clergy. (Repealed by Statute Law Revision Act 1863 (26 & 27 Vict. c. 125))
Taxation (No. 2) Act 1586 (repealed)	29 Eliz. 1. c. 8; 28 & 29 Eliz. 1. c. 8	23 March 1587
An Act for the grant of one intire subsidy and two fifteens and tenths granted by the temporalty. (Repealed by Statute Law Revision Act 1863 (26 & 27 Vict. c. 125))
Act of General Pardon 1586 (repealed)	29 Eliz. 1. c. 9; 28 & 29 Eliz. 1. c. 9	23 March 1587
An Act for the Queen's majesty's most gracious general and free pardon. (Repealed by Statute Law Revision Act 1863 (26 & 27 Vict. c. 125))

=== Private acts ===
Short title	Citation	Royal assent
Long title
Fisher's Estate Act 1586	29 Eliz. 1. c. 1 Pr. (Note: This is the citation in The Statutes of the Realm.); 28 & 29 Eliz. 1. c. 1 Pr. (Note: This is the citation in The Statutes at Large.)	23 March 1587
An act for confirmation of the sale of Edward Fisher's lands, made towards the satisfaction of his debts, charges and incumbrances.

=== Sources ===
- Raithby, John, ed. (1963) [1819]. "29° Eliz.". Statutes of the Realm. Vol. 4 Part 2: The Statutes of Queen Elizabeth (An. 28-43) and of King James (1586–1623). London: Dawsons. pp. 765–797 – via HathiTrust.
- Raithby, John, ed. (1963) [1819]. "29° Eliz.". Statutes of the Realm. Vol. 4 Part 2: The Statutes of Queen Elizabeth (An. 28-43) and of King James (1586–1623). London: Dawsons. p. 765-797 – via Google Books.
- Raithby, John, ed. (1963) [1819]. "29° Eliz.". Statutes of the Realm. Vol. 4 Part 2: The Statutes of Queen Elizabeth (An. 28-43) and of King James (1586–1623). London: Dawsons. p. 765-797 – via Internet Archive.
- Pickering, Danby, ed. (1763). "Anno vicesimo nono Elizabethæ". The Statutes at Large. Vol. 6: from the First Year of Queen Mary to the Thirty-fifth Year of Queen Elizabeth, inclusive. Cambridge: Joseph Bentham. pp. 389–397 – via Internet Archive.
- Pickering, Danby, ed. (1763). "Anno vicesimo nono Elizabethæ". The Statutes at Large. Vol. 6: from the First Year of Queen Mary to the Thirty-fifth Year of Queen Elizabeth, inclusive. Cambridge: Joseph Bentham. pp. 389–397 – via Internet Archive.
- Journal of the House of Commons. Vol. 1 – 1547-1629. His Majesty's Stationery Office. 1802 – via British History Online.
- Journal of the House of Lords. Vol. 2: 1578-1614. London: His Majesty's Stationery Office. 1830 – via British History Online.
- Chronological Table of and Index to the Statutes. Vol. 1: To the End of the Session 59 Vict. Sess. 2 (1895) (13th ed.). London: Her Majesty's Stationery Office. 1896. pp. 62–63 – via Google Books.
- Chronological Table of the Statutes: Covering the Period from 1235 to the End of 1971. London: Her Majesty's Stationery Office. 1972. p. 60. ISBN 978-0-11-840096-1 – via Google Books.
- "Chronological Tables of the Private and Personal Acts: Part 1 (1539–1601)". legislation.gov.uk. The National Archives.

== See also ==
- List of acts of the Parliament of England
