= List of acts of the Parliament of England from 1592 =

This is a list of acts of the Parliament of England for the year 1592.

For acts passed during the period 1707–1800, see the list of acts of the Parliament of Great Britain. See also the list of acts of the Parliament of Scotland, and the list of acts of the Parliament of Ireland.

For acts passed from 1801 onwards, see the list of acts of the Parliament of the United Kingdom. For acts of the devolved parliaments and assemblies in the United Kingdom, see the list of acts of the Scottish Parliament, the list of acts of the Northern Ireland Assembly, and the list of acts and measures of Senedd Cymru; see also the list of acts of the Parliament of Northern Ireland.

For medieval statutes, etc. that are not considered to be acts of Parliament, see the list of English statutes.

See also the List of ordinances and acts of the Parliament of England, 1642–1660 for ordinances and acts passed by the Long Parliament and other bodies without royal assent, and which were not considered to be valid legislation following the Restoration in 1660.

The number shown after each act's title is its chapter number. Acts are cited using this number, preceded by the years of the reign during which the relevant parliamentary session was held; thus the Union with Ireland Act 1800 is cited as "39 & 40 Geo. 3. c. 67", meaning the 67th act passed during the session that started in the 39th year of the reign of George III and which finished in the 40th year of that reign. The modern convention is to use Arabic numerals in citations (thus "41 Geo. 3" rather than "41 Geo. III"). Acts of the last session of the Parliament of Great Britain and the first session of the Parliament of the United Kingdom are both cited as "41 Geo. 3".

Acts passed by the Parliament of England did not have a short title; however, some of these acts have subsequently been given a short title by acts of the Parliament of the United Kingdom, such as the Short Titles Act 1896 (59 & 60 Vict. c. 14).

Acts passed by the Parliament of England were deemed to have come into effect on the first day of the session in which they were passed. Because of this, the years given in the list below may in fact be the year before a particular act was passed.

== 35 Eliz. 1 ==
The 8th Parliament of Queen Elizabeth I, which met from 18 February 1593 until 10 April 1593.

This session was traditionally cited as 35 Eliz., 35 Elz. or 35 El.

=== Public acts ===
Short title	Citation	Royal assent
Long title
Religion Act 1592 or the Seditious Sectaries Act 1592 or the Act Against Puritans 1592 or the Conventicle Act 1592 (repealed)	35 Eliz. 1. c. 1	10 April 1593
An Act For the preventing and avoiding of such great inconveniencies and perils as might happen and grow by the wicked and dangerous practices of seditious sectaries and disloyal persons. (Repealed by Roman Catholics Act 1844 (7 & 8 Vict. c. 102))
Popish Recusants Act 1592 (repealed)	35 Eliz. 1. c. 2	10 April 1593
An Act for Restraining Popish Recusants to some certain Places of Abode. (Repealed by Roman Catholics Act 1844 (7 & 8 Vict. c. 102))
Confirmation of Grants (Explanation) Act 1592 (repealed)	35 Eliz. 1. c. 3	10 April 1593
An Act for the explanation of a statute made in the thirty-fourth year of King Henry the Eighth, (Note: Confirmation of Grants Act 1542 (34 & 35 Hen. 8. c. 21)) as well touching grants made to his Majesty, as for confirmation of letters patents made by his Highness to others. (Repealed by Statute Law (Repeals) Act 1969 (c. 52))
Disabled Soldiers Act 1592 (repealed)	35 Eliz. 1. c. 4	10 April 1593
An Act for the necessary relief of soldiers and mariners. (Repealed by Disabled Soldiers Act 1601 (43 Eliz. 1. c. 3))
Englefield Attainder Act 1592 (repealed)	35 Eliz. 1. c. 5	10 April 1593
An Acte confyrming the Quenes Title to the lands of Sir Frauncys Englefield. (Repealed by Statute Law (Repeals) Act 1977 (c. 18))
Restriction on Building Act 1592 (repealed)	35 Eliz. 1. c. 6	10 April 1593
An Act against converting of great Houses into several Tenements, and for Restraint of Inmates and Inclosures, in and near about the City of London and Westminster. (Repealed by Statute Law Revision Act 1888 (51 & 52 Vict. c. 3))
Continuance, etc. of Laws Act 1592 (repealed)	35 Eliz. 1. c. 7	10 April 1593
An Act for the reviving, continuance, explanation and perfecting of divers statutes. (Repealed by Statute Law Revision Act 1863 (26 & 27 Vict. c. 125))
Cordage Act 1592 (repealed)	35 Eliz. 1. c. 8	10 April 1593
An Act for the avoiding of deceit used in making and selling of twice laid cordage, and for the better preserving of the navy of this realm. (Repealed by Cordage for Shipping Act 1785 (25 Geo. 3. c. 56))
Cloths Act 1592 (repealed)	35 Eliz. 1. c. 9	10 April 1593
An Act touching the breadth of plunkets, azures and blues, and other coloured cloths, made within the county of Somerset, and elsewhere of like making. (Repealed by Repeal of Obsolete Statutes Act 1856 (19 & 20 Vict. c. 64))
Cloth Act 1592 (repealed)	35 Eliz. 1. c. 10	10 April 1593
An act for the reformation of sundry abuses in clothes, called Devonshire kersies or dozens, according to a proclamation of the thirty-fourth year of the reign of our sovereign lady the Queen that now is. (Repealed by Woollen Manufacture Act 1809 (49 Geo. 3. c. 109))
Clapboard Act 1592 (repealed)	35 Eliz. 1. c. 11	10 April 1593
An Act for the Bringing in Clap-board from the Parts beyond the Seas, and the Restraining of Transporting of Wine Casks, for the Sparing and Preserving of Timber within the Realm. (Repealed by Repeal of Acts Concerning Importation Act 1822 (3 Geo. 4. c. 41))
Taxation Act 1592 (repealed)	35 Eliz. 1. c. 12	10 April 1593
An Act for confirmation of the subsidies of the clergy. (Repealed by Statute Law Revision Act 1863 (26 & 27 Vict. c. 125))
Taxation (No. 2) Act 1592 (repealed)	35 Eliz. 1. c. 13	10 April 1593
An Act for the grant of three intire subsidies, and six fitteens and tenth, granted by the temporarity. (Repealed by Statute Law Revision Act 1863 (26 & 27 Vict. c. 125))
Act of General Pardon 1592 (repealed)	35 Eliz. 1. c. 14	10 April 1593
An Act for the Queen's majesty's most gracious, free, and general pardon. (Repealed by Statute Law Revision Act 1863 (26 & 27 Vict. c. 125))

=== Private acts ===
Short title	Citation	Royal assent
Long title
City of Lincoln Confirmation of Letters Patent Act 1592	35 Eliz. 1. c. 1 Pr.	10 April 1593
An Act for the confirmation of letters patents to the mayor, sheriffs, citizens and commonality of the city of Lincoln.
Sidney Sussex College Act 1592	35 Eliz. 1. c. 2 Pr.	10 April 1593
An Act that the late scite of the dissolved house of the Gray Fryers in or near Cambridge may be sold, or lett in fea-farme, or otherwise, for the erection of a new college in the university of Cambridge.
Countess of Cumberland's Jointure Act 1592	35 Eliz. 1. c. 3 Pr.	10 April 1593
An Act for the better assurance of the jointure of the lady Margaret countess of Cumberland.
Earl of Abergavenny's Estates Act 1592 (repealed)	35 Eliz. 1. c. 4 Pr.	10 April 1593
An Act concerning the lands of Henry late lord Abergavenny deceased. (Repealed by Earl of Abergavenny's Estates Act 1864 (27 & 28 Vict. c. 9 Pr.))
Lord Hawarden's Estate Act 1592	35 Eliz. 1. c. 5 Pr.	10 April 1593
An Act to enable William lord Vauxe lord Harrowden, to sell certain manors, for payment of his debts, and for advancement of his daughters.
Restitution in blood of Sir Thomas Perrott.	35 Eliz. 1. c. 6 Pr.	10 April 1593
An Act for restitution in blood of Sir Thomas Perrott.
Naturalization of William Sydney and Peregrine Wynckfield.	35 Eliz. 1. c. 7 Pr.	10 April 1593
An Act for the naturalizing and making free of William Sidney, eldest son of Sir Robert Sidney, (Note: Robert Sidney, 1st Earl of Leicester.) knight, governor of Ulushing, (Note: Vlissingen, also known as Flushing.) and dame Barbara (Note: Barbara Sidney, Countess of Leicester.) his wife, and of Peregrine Wingfield, son and heir of Sir John Wingfield, (Note: John Wingfield.) and dame Suzan (Note: Susan Bertie, Countess of Kent.) countess of Kent his wife.
Confirmation of sale of Knightleys' estate.	35 Eliz. 1. c. 8 Pr.	10 April 1593
An Act to confirm the sale of certain manors, lands and tenements made by Sir Richard Knightley, (Note: Richard Knightley.) knight, Valentine Knightley, and Edward Knightey, esquires, unto Charles Hales, esq; Thomas Brickett, John Lambert, gent. and others.
Assurance of lands to Reade and Mabel Stafford.	35 Eliz. 1. c. 9 Pr.	10 April 1593
An Act concerning the assurance of certain lands and tenements to Read Stafford, esquire, and Mabell his wife, and to the heirs of the said Reade.
Stonehouse Water Supply Act 1592 (repealed)	35 Eliz. 1. c. 10 Pr.	10 April 1593
An Act for the bringing in of a fresh stream into the town of Stonehowse in the county of Devon. (Repealed by Plymouth Corporation Act 1915 (5 & 6 Geo. 5. c. lxix))
William Raven's Estate Act 1592	35 Eliz. 1. c. 11 Pr.	10 April 1593
An Act that Lisle Cave, Thomas Andrews, and Edmond Hasleridg, (Note: Edward Haselrig.) shall enjoy certain lands which were the lands of William Raven, gentleman, servant to Robert Taylor, one of her Majesty's tellers in the receipt of the exchequer, towards the satisfaction of some debts due to her Majesty.
Anthony Cooke of Romford's Estate Act 1592	35 Eliz. 1. c. 12 Pr.	10 April 1593
An Act touching power and liberty to repeal certain uses of a deed tripartite herein mentioned, of and in the manors, lands, and tenements of Anthony Cook of Rumford, esquire.
Naturalization of certain Englishmen's children born overseas.	35 Eliz. 1. c. 13 Pr.	10 April 1593
An Act for the naturalizing of certain Englishmens children born beyond the seas.

=== Sources ===
- Raithby, John, ed. (1963) [1819]. "35° Eliz.". Statutes of the Realm. Vol. 4 Part 2: The Statutes of Queen Elizabeth (An. 28-43) and of King James (1586–1623). London: Dawsons. pp. 840–888 – via HathiTrust.
- Raithby, John, ed. (1963) [1819]. "35° Eliz.". Statutes of the Realm. Vol. 4 Part 2: The Statutes of Queen Elizabeth (An. 28-43) and of King James (1586–1623). London: Dawsons. p. 840-888 – via Google Books.
- Raithby, John, ed. (1963) [1819]. "35° Eliz.". Statutes of the Realm. Vol. 4 Part 2: The Statutes of Queen Elizabeth (An. 28-43) and of King James (1586–1623). London: Dawsons. p. 840-888 – via Internet Archive.
- Pickering, Danby, ed. (1763). "Anno tricesimo quinto Elizabethæ". The Statutes at Large. Vol. 6: from the First Year of Queen Mary to the Thirty-fifth Year of Queen Elizabeth, inclusive. Cambridge: Joseph Bentham. pp. 422–448 – via Internet Archive.
- Pickering, Danby, ed. (1763). "Anno tricesimo quinto Elizabethæ". The Statutes at Large. Vol. 6: from the First Year of Queen Mary to the Thirty-fifth Year of Queen Elizabeth, inclusive. Cambridge: Joseph Bentham. pp. 422–448 – via Internet Archive.
- Journal of the House of Commons. Vol. 1 – 1547-1629. His Majesty's Stationery Office. 1802 – via British History Online.
- Journal of the House of Lords. Vol. 2: 1578-1614. London: His Majesty's Stationery Office. 1830 – via British History Online.
- Chronological Table of and Index to the Statutes. Vol. 1: To the End of the Session 59 Vict. Sess. 2 (1895) (13th ed.). London: Her Majesty's Stationery Office. 1896. p. 63 – via Google Books.
- Chronological Table of the Statutes: Covering the Period from 1235 to the End of 1971. London: Her Majesty's Stationery Office. 1972. p. 61. ISBN 978-0-11-840096-1 – via Google Books.
- "Chronological Tables of the Private and Personal Acts: Part 1 (1539–1601)". legislation.gov.uk. The National Archives.

== See also ==
- List of acts of the Parliament of England
