= British History Online =

Digital library of sources on history

- Website type: Digital library
- Available in: English
- Headquarters: London
- Country of origin: United Kingdom
- Owners: Institute of Historical Research, University of London
- Editor: John Levin
- Industry: Academia
- Website: www.british-history.ac.uk
- Registration: Optional
- Launched: 2003
- Current status: Active

British History Online is a digital library of primary and secondary sources on medieval and modern history of Great Britain and Ireland. It was created and is managed as a cooperative venture by the Institute of Historical Research, University of London and the History of Parliament Trust. Access to the majority of the content is free, but other content is available only to paying subscribers.

The content includes secondary sources such as the publications of The History of Parliament, the Royal Commission on the Historical Monuments of England, the Calendar of Close Rolls, Survey of London and the Victoria County History; and major published primary sources such as Letters and Papers of the Reign of Henry VIII and the Journals of the House of Lords and House of Commons.

The places covered by British History Online are:

Area	Description
East (of England)	The English historic counties of Bedfordshire, Cambridgeshire, Essex, Hertfordshire, Huntingdonshire, Norfolk and Suffolk.
London	The area now covered by the 32 London boroughs. Includes the historic county of Middlesex, and parts of Surrey, Essex and Kent.
Midlands (of England)	The English historic counties of Derbyshire, Herefordshire, Leicestershire, Lincolnshire, Northamptonshire, Nottinghamshire, Rutland, Shropshire, Staffordshire, Warwickshire and Worcestershire.
North (of England)	The English historic counties of Cheshire, Cumberland, Durham, Lancashire, Northumberland, Westmorland and Yorkshire.
South East (of England)	Includes the English historic counties of Berkshire, Buckinghamshire, Hampshire, Kent, Oxfordshire, Surrey and Sussex. Parts of Surrey and Kent are included in the London region.
South West (of England)	The English historic counties of Cornwall, Devon, Dorset, Gloucestershire, Somerset and Wiltshire.
Ireland	The counties of Ireland.
Scotland	The historic counties of Scotland.
Wales	The historic counties of Wales.

British History Online began with a one-year pilot project in 2002 (Version 1.0), and Version 5.0 was launched in December 2014. Version 5.0 contains a number of new features, including subject guides for local, parliamentary and urban history, and a new viewer for the site's collection of historical and Epoch 1 Ordnance Survey maps.

== See also ==
- List of civil parishes in England
