= List of acts of the Parliament of England from 1575 =

This is a list of acts of the Parliament of England for the year 1575.

For acts passed during the period 1707–1800, see the list of acts of the Parliament of Great Britain. See also the list of acts of the Parliament of Scotland, and the list of acts of the Parliament of Ireland.

For acts passed from 1801 onwards, see the list of acts of the Parliament of the United Kingdom. For acts of the devolved parliaments and assemblies in the United Kingdom, see the list of acts of the Scottish Parliament, the list of acts of the Northern Ireland Assembly, and the list of acts and measures of Senedd Cymru; see also the list of acts of the Parliament of Northern Ireland.

For medieval statutes, etc. that are not considered to be acts of Parliament, see the list of English statutes.

See also the List of ordinances and acts of the Parliament of England, 1642–1660 for ordinances and acts passed by the Long Parliament and other bodies without royal assent, and which were not considered to be valid legislation following the Restoration in 1660.

The number shown after each act's title is its chapter number. Acts are cited using this number, preceded by the years of the reign during which the relevant parliamentary session was held; thus the Union with Ireland Act 1800 is cited as "39 & 40 Geo. 3. c. 67", meaning the 67th act passed during the session that started in the 39th year of the reign of George III and which finished in the 40th year of that reign. The modern convention is to use Arabic numerals in citations (thus "41 Geo. 3" rather than "41 Geo. III"). Acts of the last session of the Parliament of Great Britain and the first session of the Parliament of the United Kingdom are both cited as "41 Geo. 3".

Acts passed by the Parliament of England did not have a short title; however, some of these acts have subsequently been given a short title by acts of the Parliament of the United Kingdom, such as the Short Titles Act 1896 (59 & 60 Vict. c. 14).

Acts passed by the Parliament of England were deemed to have come into effect on the first day of the session in which they were passed. Because of this, the years given in the list below may in fact be the year before a particular act was passed.

== 18 Eliz. 1 ==
The second session of the 4th Parliament of Queen Elizabeth I, which met from 8 February 1576 until 15 March 1576.

This session was traditionally cited as 18 Eliz., 18 Elz. or 18 El.

=== Public acts ===
Short title	Citation	Royal assent
Long title
Coin Act 1575 (repealed)	18 Eliz. 1. c. 1	15 March 1576
An Act against diminishing and impairing of the Queen's Majesty's Coins, and other Coins lawfully current within the Realm. (Repealed by Coinage Offences Act 1832 (2 & 3 Will. 4. c. 34))
Crown Lands Act 1575 (repealed)	18 Eliz. 1. c. 2	15 March 1576
An Act for Confirmation as well of all Grants made to the Queen's Majesty, as of Letters Patents made by Her Majesty to others. (Repealed by Statute Law Revision Act 1948 (11 & 12 Geo. 6. c. 62))
Poor Act 1575 (repealed)	18 Eliz. 1. c. 3	15 March 1576
An Act for the setting of Poor on Work, and for the avoiding of Idleness. (Repealed by Statute Law Revision Act 1863 (26 & 27 Vict. c. 125))
Fraudulent Conveyances Act 1575 (repealed)	18 Eliz. 1. c. 4	15 March 1576
An Act for the avoiding of Frauds, in certain Conveyances and Assurances made by the late Rebels in the North. (Repealed by Statute Law Revision Act 1948 (11 & 12 Geo. 6. c. 62))
Common Informers Act 1575 (repealed)	18 Eliz. 1. c. 5	15 March 1576
An Acte to redresse Disorders in Common Informers upon Penall Lawes. (Repealed by Statute Law Revision Act 1959 (7 & 8 Eliz. 2. c. 68))
Universities and Colleges (Leases, etc.) Act 1575 (repealed)	18 Eliz. 1. c. 6	15 March 1576
An Act for the Maintenance of the Colleges in both the Universities, and also in Winchestre and Eaton. (Repealed by Universities and College Estates Act 1925 (15 & 16 Geo. 5. c. 24))
Benefit of Clergy Act 1575 (repealed)	18 Eliz. 1. c. 7	15 March 1576
An Act to take away clergy from the offenders in rape and burglary, and an order for the delivery of clerks convict without purgation. (Repealed by Offences Against the Person Act 1828 (9 Geo. 4. c. 31 and for India by Criminal Law (India) Act 1828))
Welsh Circuits Act 1575 (repealed)	18 Eliz. 1. c. 8	15 March 1576
An Act for the appointing and authorizing of Justices of Assize in the Shires of Wales. (Repealed by Statute Law Revision Act 1863 (26 & 27 Vict. c. 125))
Exportation Act 1575 (repealed)	18 Eliz. 1. c. 9	15 March 1576
An Act against the transporting of Leather, Tallow, and Raw Hides, out of the Realm. (Repealed by Repeal of Acts Concerning Importation Act 1822 (3 Geo. 4. c. 41))
Highways Act 1575 (repealed)	18 Eliz. 1. c. 10	15 March 1576
An Act of Addition unto the former Acts, for the amending and repairing of Highways. (Repealed by Highways (No. 2) Act 1766 (7 Geo. 3. c. 42))
Ecclesiastical Leases Act 1575 (repealed)	18 Eliz. 1. c. 11	15 March 1576
An Acte for Thexplanacion of the Statutes entytuled againste the defeating of Dilapidacions, and againste Leases to bee made of Spirituall Promocions in some Respectes. (Repealed by Statute Law (Repeals) Act 1998 (c. 43))
Nisi Prius (Middlesex) Act 1575 (repealed)	18 Eliz. 1. c. 12	15 March 1576
An Act for the Trial of Nisi Prius, in the County of Middlesex. (Repealed by Civil Procedure Acts Repeal Act 1879 (42 & 43 Vict. c. 59))
Knight Service Act 1575 (repealed)	18 Eliz. 1. c. 13	15 March 1576
An Act concerning Offices found within the Counties Palatine. (Repealed by Statute Law Revision Act 1863 (26 & 27 Vict. c. 125))
Jeofails Act 1575 (repealed)	18 Eliz. 1. c. 14	15 March 1576
An Act for Reformation of Jeofails. (Repealed by Statute Law Revision and Civil Procedure Act 1883 (46 & 47 Vict. c. 49))
Marking Plate Act 1575 (repealed)	18 Eliz. 1. c. 15	15 March 1576
An Act for Reformation of Abuses in Goldsmiths. (Repealed by Statute Law Revision Act 1863 (26 & 27 Vict. c. 125) and Statute Law (Repeals) Act 1969 (c. 52))
Clothiers Act 1575 (repealed)	18 Eliz. 1. c. 16	15 March 1576
An Act for the Toleration of certain Clothiers, in the Counties of Wilteshire, Somerss. and Glocestre, to inhabit out of Towns Corporate. (Repealed by Continuance, etc. of Laws Act 1623 (21 Jas. 1. c. 28))
Rochester Bridge Act 1575 (repealed)	18 Eliz. 1. c. 17	15 March 1576
An Act for the perpetual Maintenance of Rochester Bridge. (Repealed by Rochester Bridge Act 1908 (8 Edw. 7. c. lvii))
Chepstow Bridge Act 1575 (repealed)	18 Eliz. 1. c. 18	15 March 1576
An Act for the repairing of Chepstowe Bridge. (Repealed by Chepstow Bridge (Maintenance, etc.) Act 1605 (3 Jas. 1. c. 23))
Paving of Streets (Chichester) Act 1575 (repealed)	18 Eliz. 1. c. 19	15 March 1576
An Act for the paving of the City of Chichestre. (Repealed by Chichester Paving and Improvement Act 1791 (31 Geo. 3. c. 63))
Road Repairs (Oxford) Act 1575	18 Eliz. 1. c. 20	15 March 1576
An Act for the repairing and amending of the Bridges and Highways near unto the City of Oxforde.
Wool Sale (New Woodstock) Act 1575 (repealed)	18 Eliz. 1. c. 21	15 March 1576
An Act for the Relief and Re-edifying of the Borough of New-Woodstock, in the County of Oxforde. (Repealed by Statute Law Revision Act 1948 (11 & 12 Geo. 6. c. 62))
Taxation Act 1575 (repealed)	18 Eliz. 1. c. 22	15 March 1576
An Act for Confirmation of a Subsidy granted by the Clergy. (Repealed by Statute Law Revision Act 1863 (26 & 27 Vict. c. 125))
Taxation (No. 2) Act 1575 (repealed)	18 Eliz. 1. c. 23	15 March 1576
An Act of Two Fifteenths and Tenths, and one Subsidy, granted by the Temporalty. (Repealed by Statute Law Revision Act 1863 (26 & 27 Vict. c. 125))
Act of General Pardon 1575 (repealed)	18 Eliz. 1. c. 24	15 March 1576
An Act of the Queen's Majesty's most Free and General Pardon. (Repealed by Statute Law Revision Act 1863 (26 & 27 Vict. c. 125))

=== Private acts ===
Short title	Citation	Royal assent
Long title
Leicester Hospital Act 1575	18 Eliz. 1. c. 1 Pr.	15 March 1576
An Act for the Hospital of Leycestre.
St. Cross Hospital, Winchester Act 1575	18 Eliz. 1. c. 2 Pr.	15 March 1576
An Act for the Hospital of St. Crosse, near Winchestre.
Parish of Halifax Tithes Act 1575	18 Eliz. 1. c. 3 Pr.	15 March 1576
An Act concerning Tythes within the Parish of Hallifaxe.
Assurance of Manor of New Hall to Thomas Earl of Sussex.	18 Eliz. 1. c. 4 Pr.	15 March 1576
An Act for the Assurance of the Manor of Newehall to Thomas Earl of Sussex, Lord Chamberlain of Her Majesty's Most Honourable Houshold.
Viscount Howard of Byndon, and Henry and Frances Howard.	18 Eliz. 1. c. 5 Pr.	15 March 1576
An Act for the Lord Viscount Howarde of Byndon, and Henry Howarde, Esquire, and Frauncys his Wife.
Restitution in blood of Lord Norris of Rycote.	18 Eliz. 1. c. 6 Pr.	15 March 1576
An Act for the Restitution in Blood of Henry Norrys, Knight, Lord Norrys of Rycott.
Naturalization of Lady Gray.	18 Eliz. 1. c. 7 Pr.	15 March 1576
An Act, That the Lady Jana Sibilla, Wife to the Lord Graye of Wilton, born beyond the Seas, may be deemed and reputed as mere English.
Assurance of lands to Christopher Hatton.	18 Eliz. 1. c. 8 Pr.	15 March 1576
An Act for the Assurance of certain Lands and Tenements unto Christopher Hatton, Esquire, Gentleman of Her Majesty's Privy Chamber, and Captain of Her Highness's Guard.
Payment of William Iseleye's debts.	18 Eliz. 1. c. 9 Pr.	15 March 1576
An Act for the true Payment of the Debts of William Isleye, Esquire.
Assurance of lands to Sir John Ryvers.	18 Eliz. 1. c. 10 Pr.	15 March 1576
An Act for the Assurance of certain Lands to Sir John Ryvers, Knight.
Naturalization of twelve citizens of Antwerp.	18 Eliz. 1. c. 11 Pr.	15 March 1576
An Act, That certain Persons born beyond the Sea may be deemed and reputed as mere English.
Naturalization of certain persons.	18 Eliz. 1. c. 12 Pr.	15 March 1576
Another Act, That certain Persons born beyond the Sea may be deemed and reputed as mere English.
Richard Huddleston, Isabel Weyneman his wife and Francis Weyneman: confirmation of an arbitration.	18 Eliz. 1. c. 13 Pr.	15 March 1576
An Act for the Confirmation of an Arbitrement to be made by certain Persons, between Richard Huddleston, Esquire, and Dame Isabell Weyman his Wife, on the one Part, and Frauncys Weyman, Gentleman, of the other Part.

=== Sources ===
- "18° Eliz.". The Statutes of the Realm. Vol. 4 Part 1: 1547 to 1584. pp. 606–655 – via HathiTrust.
- Pickering, Danby, ed. (1763). "Anno decimo octavo Elizabethæ". The Statutes at Large. Vol. 6: from the First Year of Queen Mary to the Thirty-fifth Year of Queen Elizabeth, inclusive. Cambridge: Joseph Bentham. pp. 309–332 – via Internet Archive.
- Pickering, Danby, ed. (1763). "Anno decimo octavo Elizabethæ". The Statutes at Large. Vol. 6: from the First Year of Queen Mary to the Thirty-fifth Year of Queen Elizabeth, inclusive. Cambridge: Joseph Bentham. pp. 309–332 – via Internet Archive.
- Journal of the House of Commons. Vol. 1 – 1547-1629. His Majesty's Stationery Office. 1802 – via British History Online.
- Journal of the House of Lords. Vol. 1: 1509-1577. London: His Majesty's Stationery Office. 1830 – via British History Online.
- Chronological Table of and Index to the Statutes. Vol. 1: To the End of the Session 59 Vict. Sess. 2 (1895) (13th ed.). London: Her Majesty's Stationery Office. 1896. pp. 61–62 – via Google Books.
- Chronological Table of the Statutes: Covering the Period from 1235 to the End of 1971. London: Her Majesty's Stationery Office. 1972. p. 59. ISBN 978-0-11-840096-1 – via Google Books.
- "Acts of the English Parliament from 1575". legislation.gov.uk. The National Archives.
- "Chronological Tables of the Private and Personal Acts: Part 1 (1539–1601)". legislation.gov.uk. The National Archives.

== See also ==
- List of acts of the Parliament of England
