= List of acts of the Parliament of England from 1588 =

This is a list of acts of the Parliament of England for the year 1588.

For acts passed during the period 1707–1800, see the list of acts of the Parliament of Great Britain. See also the list of acts of the Parliament of Scotland, and the list of acts of the Parliament of Ireland.

For acts passed from 1801 onwards, see the list of acts of the Parliament of the United Kingdom. For acts of the devolved parliaments and assemblies in the United Kingdom, see the list of acts of the Scottish Parliament, the list of acts of the Northern Ireland Assembly, and the list of acts and measures of Senedd Cymru; see also the list of acts of the Parliament of Northern Ireland.

For medieval statutes, etc. that are not considered to be acts of Parliament, see the list of English statutes.

See also the List of ordinances and acts of the Parliament of England, 1642–1660 for ordinances and acts passed by the Long Parliament and other bodies without royal assent, and which were not considered to be valid legislation following the Restoration in 1660.

The number shown after each act's title is its chapter number. Acts are cited using this number, preceded by the years of the reign during which the relevant parliamentary session was held; thus the Union with Ireland Act 1800 is cited as "39 & 40 Geo. 3. c. 67", meaning the 67th act passed during the session that started in the 39th year of the reign of George III and which finished in the 40th year of that reign. The modern convention is to use Arabic numerals in citations (thus "41 Geo. 3" rather than "41 Geo. III"). Acts of the last session of the Parliament of Great Britain and the first session of the Parliament of the United Kingdom are both cited as "41 Geo. 3".

Acts passed by the Parliament of England did not have a short title; however, some of these acts have subsequently been given a short title by acts of the Parliament of the United Kingdom, such as the Short Titles Act 1896 (59 & 60 Vict. c. 14).

Acts passed by the Parliament of England were deemed to have come into effect on the first day of the session in which they were passed. Because of this, the years given in the list below may in fact be the year before a particular act was passed.

== 31 Eliz. 1 ==
The 7th Parliament of Queen Elizabeth I, which met from 4 February 1589 until 29 March 1589.

This session was traditionally cited as 31 Eliz., 31 Elz. or 31 El.

=== Public acts ===
Short title	Citation	Royal assent
Long title
Error Act 1588 (repealed)	31 Eliz. 1. c. 1	29 March 1589
An Act against discontinuances of writs of error in the courts of exchequer and King's bench. (Repealed by Statute Law Revision Act 1863 (26 & 27 Vict. c. 125))
Fines of Land Act 1588 (repealed)	31 Eliz. 1. c. 2	29 March 1589
An Act for abridging of proclamations upon fines to be levied at the common law. (Repealed by Statute Law Revision Act 1863 (26 & 27 Vict. c. 125))
Avoidance of Secret Outlawries Act 1588 (repealed)	31 Eliz. 1. c. 3	29 March 1589
An Act for the avoiding of privy and secret outlawries of her Majesty's subjects. (Repealed by Civil Procedure Acts Repeal Act 1879 (42 & 43 Vict. c. 59))
Embezzlement Act 1588 (repealed)	31 Eliz. 1. c. 4	29 March 1589
An Act against imbezilling of armour, habiliments of war, and victual. (Repealed for England and Wales by Criminal Statutes Repeal Act 1827 (7 & 8 Geo. 4. c. 27) and for India by Criminal Law (India) Act 1828 (9 Geo. 4. c. 74))
Common Informers Act 1588 (repealed)	31 Eliz. 1. c. 5	29 March 1589
An Act concerning informers. (Repealed by Statute Law Revision Act 1959 (7 & 8 Eliz. 2. c. 68))
Simony Act 1588	31 Eliz. 1. c. 6	29 March 1589
An Act against abuses in election of scholars, and presentation to benefices.
Erection of Cottages Act 1588 (repealed)	31 Eliz. 1. c. 7	29 March 1589
An Act against the erecting and maintaining of Cottages. (Repealed by Erection of Cottages Act 1775 (15 Geo. 3. c. 32))
Sale of Beer Act 1588 (repealed)	31 Eliz. 1. c. 8	29 March 1589
An Act for the true gauging of vessels brought from beyond the seas, converted by brewers for the utterance and sale of ale and beer. (Repealed by Statute Law Revision Act 1863 (26 & 27 Vict. c. 125))
Proclamations and Exigents (Durham) Act 1588 (repealed)	31 Eliz. 1. c. 9	29 March 1589
An Act for writes upon proclamations and exigents, to be current within the county palatine of Durham. (Repealed by Administration of Justice (Miscellaneous Provisions) Act 1938 (1 & 2 Geo. 6. c. 63))
Continuance, etc. of Laws Act 1588 (repealed)	31 Eliz. 1. c. 10	29 March 1589
An Act for the continuance and perfecting of divers statutes. (Repealed by Civil Procedure Acts Repeal Act 1879 (42 & 43 Vict. c. 59))
Forcible Entry Act 1588 (repealed)	31 Eliz. 1. c. 11	29 March 1589
An Act for explanation or declaration of the statute of octavo Regis Henrici Sexti, (Note: Forcible Entry Act 1429 (8 Hen. 6. c. 9)) concerning forcible entries, the indictments thereupon found. (Repealed by Criminal Law Act 1977 (c. 45))
Sale of Horses Act 1588 (repealed)	31 Eliz. 1. c. 12	29 March 1589
An Act to avoid horse-stealing. (Repealed by Criminal Law Act 1967 (c. 58))
Dover Harbour Act 1588 (repealed)	31 Eliz. 1. c. 13	29 March 1589
An Act for reviving and enlarging of a statute made in the twenty-third year of her Majesty's reign, (Note: Dover Harbour Act 1580 (23 Eliz. 1. c. 6)) for repairing of Dover haven. (Repealed by Statute Law Revision Act 1948 (11 & 12 Geo. 6. c. 62))
Taxation Act 1588 (repealed)	31 Eliz. 1. c. 14	29 March 1589
An Act for confirmation of the subsidies of the clergy. (Repealed by Statute Law Revision Act 1863 (26 & 27 Vict. c. 125))
Taxation (No. 2) Act 1588 (repealed)	31 Eliz. 1. c. 15	29 March 1589
An Act for the granting of four fifteens and tenths, and two entire subsidies, to our most gracious sovereign lady the Queen's most excellent majesty. (Repealed by Statute Law Revision Act 1863 (26 & 27 Vict. c. 125))
Act of General Pardon Act 1588 (repealed)	31 Eliz. 1. c. 16	29 March 1589
An Act for the Queen's majesty's most gracious, general, and free pardon. (Repealed by Statute Law Revision Act 1863 (26 & 27 Vict. c. 125))

=== Private acts ===
Short title	Citation	Royal assent
Long title
Orford Harbour Act 1588	31 Eliz. 1. c. 1 Pr.	29 March 1589
An Act for the preservation of the haven of Orford.
Naturalization of Joyce Lambert Act 1588	31 Eliz. 1. c. 2 Pr.	29 March 1589
An Act for the naturalizing of the daughter of Ralph Elking, gentleman, wife of Richard Lambert.
Anne Nevell's Jointure Act 1588	31 Eliz. 1. c. 3 Pr.	29 March 1589
An Act for the assurance of the jointure of Anne the wife of Henry Nevill.
Lambourn Almshouse Act 1588	31 Eliz. 1. c. 4 Pr.	29 March 1589
An Act concerning the almshouse at Lamberne in Berkshire.
Relief of the City of Lincoln Act 1588	31 Eliz. 1. c. 5 Pr.	29 March 1589
An Act for the relief of the city of Lincoln.
Thomas Handford's Estate Act 1588	31 Eliz. 1. c. 6 Pr.	29 March 1589
An Act for the sale of Thomas Handford's lands, towards the payment of his debts.
Thomas Hesilrigge's Estate Act 1588	31 Eliz. 1. c. 7 Pr.	29 March 1589
An Act for the avoiding of certain conveyances, and other estates, supposed to be procured by Thomas Drury, of the lands of Thomas Haslerigg.
Tonbridge Grammar School Estate Act 1588	31 Eliz. 1. c. 8 Pr.	29 March 1589
An Act for the better assurance of lands and tenements for the maintenance of the grammar school at Cambridge.

=== Sources ===
- Raithby, John, ed. (1963) [1819]. "31° Eliz.". Statutes of the Realm. Vol. 4 Part 2: The Statutes of Queen Elizabeth (An. 28-43) and of King James (1586–1623). London: Dawsons. pp. 798–839 – via HathiTrust.
- Raithby, John, ed. (1963) [1819]. "31° Eliz.". Statutes of the Realm. Vol. 4 Part 2: The Statutes of Queen Elizabeth (An. 28-43) and of King James (1586–1623). London: Dawsons. p. 798-839 – via Google Books.
- Raithby, John, ed. (1963) [1819]. "31° Eliz.". Statutes of the Realm. Vol. 4 Part 2: The Statutes of Queen Elizabeth (An. 28-43) and of King James (1586–1623). London: Dawsons. p. 798-839 – via Internet Archive.
- Pickering, Danby, ed. (1763). "Anno tricesimo primo Elizabethæ". The Statutes at Large. Vol. 6: from the First Year of Queen Mary to the Thirty-fifth Year of Queen Elizabeth, inclusive. Cambridge: Joseph Bentham. pp. 397–422 – via Internet Archive.
- Pickering, Danby, ed. (1763). "Anno tricesimo primo Elizabethæ". The Statutes at Large. Vol. 6: from the First Year of Queen Mary to the Thirty-fifth Year of Queen Elizabeth, inclusive. Cambridge: Joseph Bentham. pp. 397–422 – via Internet Archive.
- Journal of the House of Commons. Vol. 1 – 1547-1629. His Majesty's Stationery Office. 1802 – via British History Online.
- Journal of the House of Lords. Vol. 2: 1578-1614. London: His Majesty's Stationery Office. 1830 – via British History Online.
- Chronological Table of and Index to the Statutes. Vol. 1: To the End of the Session 59 Vict. Sess. 2 (1895) (13th ed.). London: Her Majesty's Stationery Office. 1896. p. 63 – via Google Books.
- Chronological Table of the Statutes: Covering the Period from 1235 to the End of 1971. London: Her Majesty's Stationery Office. 1972. pp. 60–61. ISBN 978-0-11-840096-1 – via Google Books.
- "Acts of the English Parliament from 1588". legislation.gov.uk. The National Archives.
- "Chronological Tables of the Private and Personal Acts: Part 1 (1539–1601)". legislation.gov.uk. The National Archives.

== See also ==
- List of acts of the Parliament of England
