= List of acts of the Parliament of England from 1572 =

This is a list of acts of the Parliament of England for the year 1572.

For acts passed during the period 1707–1800, see the list of acts of the Parliament of Great Britain. See also the list of acts of the Parliament of Scotland, and the list of acts of the Parliament of Ireland.

For acts passed from 1801 onwards, see the list of acts of the Parliament of the United Kingdom. For acts of the devolved parliaments and assemblies in the United Kingdom, see the list of acts of the Scottish Parliament, the list of acts of the Northern Ireland Assembly, and the list of acts and measures of Senedd Cymru; see also the list of acts of the Parliament of Northern Ireland.

For medieval statutes, etc. that are not considered to be acts of Parliament, see the list of English statutes.

See also the List of ordinances and acts of the Parliament of England, 1642–1660 for ordinances and acts passed by the Long Parliament and other bodies without royal assent, and which were not considered to be valid legislation following the Restoration in 1660.

The number shown after each act's title is its chapter number. Acts are cited using this number, preceded by the years of the reign during which the relevant parliamentary session was held; thus the Union with Ireland Act 1800 is cited as "39 & 40 Geo. 3. c. 67", meaning the 67th act passed during the session that started in the 39th year of the reign of George III and which finished in the 40th year of that reign. The modern convention is to use Arabic numerals in citations (thus "41 Geo. 3" rather than "41 Geo. III"). Acts of the last session of the Parliament of Great Britain and the first session of the Parliament of the United Kingdom are both cited as "41 Geo. 3".

Acts passed by the Parliament of England did not have a short title; however, some of these acts have subsequently been given a short title by acts of the Parliament of the United Kingdom, such as the Short Titles Act 1896 (59 & 60 Vict. c. 14).

Acts passed by the Parliament of England were deemed to have come into effect on the first day of the session in which they were passed. Because of this, the years given in the list below may in fact be the year before a particular act was passed.

== 14 Eliz. 1 ==
The first session of the 4th Parliament of Queen Elizabeth I, which met from 8 May 1572 until 30 June 1572.

This session was traditionally cited as 14 Eliz., 14 Elz. or 14 El.

=== Public acts ===
Short title	Citation	Royal assent
Long title
Rebellion Act 1572 (repealed)	14 Eliz. 1. c. 1	30 June 1572
An Act for the Punishment of such as shall rebelliously take or detain from the Queen's Majesty any of her Castles, Towers, Fortresses, Holds, etc. (Repealed by Statute Law Revision Act 1863 (26 & 27 Vict. c. 125))
Escape of Traitors Act 1572 (repealed)	14 Eliz. 1. c. 2	30 June 1572
An Act against such as shall conspire or practise the Enlargement of any Prisoner committed for High Treason. (Repealed by Statute Law Revision Act 1863 (26 & 27 Vict. c. 125))
Coin Act 1572 (repealed)	14 Eliz. 1. c. 3	30 June 1572
An Act against the forging and counterfeiting of Foreign Coin, being not current within this Realm. (Repealed by Coinage Offences Act 1832 (2 & 3 Will. 4. c. 34))
Exportation Act 1572 (repealed)	14 Eliz. 1. c. 4	30 June 1572
An Act to revive a Statute, made Anno Primo of the Queen's Majesty's Reign, (Note: Exportation (No. 2) Act 1558 (1 Eliz. 1. c. 10)) inhibiting the carrying of Leather, Tallow, and Raw Hides, out of the Realm. (Repealed by Statute Law Revision Act 1863 (26 & 27 Vict. c. 125))
Vagabonds Act 1572 or the Vagabonds, etc. Act 1572 (repealed)	14 Eliz. 1. c. 5	30 June 1572
An Act for the Punishment of Vagabonds, and for the Relief of the Poor and Impotent. (Repealed by Statute Law Revision Act 1863 (26 & 27 Vict. c. 125))
Fugitives Act 1572 (repealed)	14 Eliz. 1. c. 6	30 June 1572
An Act for the Explanation of a Statute, made against Fugitives over the Seas, in the 13th Year of the Queen's Majesty's Reign. (Note: Fugitives Act 1571 (13 Eliz. 1. c. 3)) (Repealed by Statute Law Revision Act 1863 (26 & 27 Vict. c. 125))
Tenths Act 1572 (repealed)	14 Eliz. 1. c. 7	30 June 1572
An Act against the Deceipts of Under Collectors of the Tenths and Subsidies of the Clergy. (Repealed by Statute Law Revision Act 1863 (26 & 27 Vict. c. 125))
Recoveries Act 1572 (repealed)	14 Eliz. 1. c. 8	30 June 1572
An Act for the avoiding of Recoveries suffered by Collusion of Tenants for Term of Life, and such others. (Repealed by Statute Law Revision Act 1863 (26 & 27 Vict. c. 125))
Juries Act 1572 (repealed)	14 Eliz. 1. c. 9	30 June 1572
An Act declaring, That the Tenant and Defendant may have a Tales de Circumstantibus, as well as the Demandant or Plaintiff. (Repealed by Juries Act 1825 (6 Geo. 4. c. 50))
Kerseys Act 1572 (repealed)	14 Eliz. 1. c. 10	30 June 1572
An Act to reform the excessive Length of Kerseys. (Repealed by Kerseys Act 1605 (3 Jas. 1. c. 16))
Ecclesiastical Leases Act 1572 (repealed)	14 Eliz. 1. c. 11	30 June 1572
An Act for the Continuation, Explanation, perfecting, and enlarging of divers Statutes. (Repealed by Statute Law (Repeals) Act 1998 (c. 43))
Partial Repeal of 8 Eliz. 1 c. 7 Act 1572 (repealed)	14 Eliz. 1. c. 12	30 June 1572
An Act for the Repeal of a Statute, made Anno 8° of the Queen's Majesty's Reign, (Note: Drapers, etc. (Shrewsbury) Act 1566 (8 Eliz. 1. c. 7)) touching the Town of Shrewsburie. (Repealed by Statute Law Revision Act 1863 (26 & 27 Vict. c. 125))
Hexhamshire Act 1572 (repealed)	14 Eliz. 1. c. 13	30 June 1572
An Act for the annexing of Hexham and Hexhamshire to the County of Northumberlande. (Repealed by Statute Law (Repeals) Act 1975 (26 & 27 Vict. c. 125))
Hospitals for the Poor Act 1572 (repealed)	14 Eliz. 1. c. 14	30 June 1572
An Act for the Assurance of Gifts, Grants, etc. made, and to be made, for the Relief of the Poor in Hospitals, etc. (Repealed by Charities Act 1960 (8 & 9 Eliz. 2. c. 58))

=== Private acts ===
Short title	Citation	Royal assent
Long title
Plumstead Marsh Inclosure and Drainage Act 1572	14 Eliz. 1. c. 1 Pr.	30 June 1572
An Act for the Continuance of the Inning of Plumsted Marsh, in the County of Kent, being surrounded.
Tonbridge Grammar School Estate Act 1572	14 Eliz. 1. c. 2 Pr.	30 June 1572
An Act for the better and further Assurance of certain Lands and Tenements, to the Maintenance of the Free Grammar-School of Tunbridge, in the County of Kent.
Woodhouse's Estate Act 1572	14 Eliz. 1. c. 3 Pr.	30 June 1572
An Act for the Assurance of certain Lands and Tenements, according to the Meaning of Sir Thomas and Sir William Woodhouse, Knights, for the Benefit of certain Infants.

=== Sources ===
- "14° Eliz.". The Statutes of the Realm. Vol. 4 Part 1: 1547 to 1584. pp. 587–605 – via HathiTrust.
- Pickering, Danby, ed. (1763). "Anno decimo quarto Elizabethæ". The Statutes at Large. Vol. 6: from the First Year of Queen Mary to the Thirty-fifth Year of Queen Elizabeth, inclusive. Cambridge: Joseph Bentham. pp. 298–309 – via Internet Archive.
- Pickering, Danby, ed. (1763). "Anno decimo quarto Elizabethæ". The Statutes at Large. Vol. 6: from the First Year of Queen Mary to the Thirty-fifth Year of Queen Elizabeth, inclusive. Cambridge: Joseph Bentham. pp. 298–309 – via Internet Archive.
- Journal of the House of Commons. Vol. 1 – 1547-1629. His Majesty's Stationery Office. 1802 – via British History Online.
- Journal of the House of Lords. Vol. 1: 1509-1577. London: His Majesty's Stationery Office. 1830 – via British History Online.
- Chronological Table of and Index to the Statutes. Vol. 1: To the End of the Session 59 Vict. Sess. 2 (1895) (13th ed.). London: Her Majesty's Stationery Office. 1896. p. 61 – via Google Books.
- Chronological Table of the Statutes: Covering the Period from 1235 to the End of 1971. London: Her Majesty's Stationery Office. 1972. p. 59. ISBN 978-0-11-840096-1 – via Google Books.
- "Acts of the English Parliament from 1572". legislation.gov.uk. The National Archives.
- "Chronological Tables of the Private and Personal Acts: Part 1 (1539–1601)". legislation.gov.uk. The National Archives.

== See also ==
- List of acts of the Parliament of England
