= Statute Law Revision Act 1863 =

Act of the Parliament of the United Kingdom

Statute Law Revision Act 1863 (Note: Section 3.)
- Act of Parliament
- Parliament of the United Kingdom
- Long title: An Act for promoting the Revision of the Statute Law by repealing certain Enactments which have ceased to be in force or have become unnecessary.
- Citation: 26 & 27 Vict. c. 125
- Introduced by: Constantine Phipps, 1st Marquess of Normanby (Lords)
- Territorial extent: England and Wales (Note: Section 2.)

Dates
- Royal assent: 28 July 1863
- Commencement: 28 July 1863 (Note: The Acts of Parliament (Commencement) Act 1793.)
Other legislation
Amends	See § Repealed enactments
Repeals/revokes	See § Repealed enactments
Amended by	Statute Law Revision Act 1893
Relates to	Repeal of Acts Concerning Importation Act 1822; Repeal of Obsolete Statutes Act 1856; Statute Law Revision (Ireland) Act 1872; See Statute Law Revision Act

Status: Partially repealed

History of passage through Parliament

Records of Parliamentary debate relating to the statute from Hansard

Text of statute as originally enacted

The Statute Law Revision Act 1863 (26 & 27 Vict. c. 125) is an act of the Parliament of the United Kingdom that repealed for England and Wales enactments from 1235 to 1685 which had ceased to be in force or had become unnecessary. The act was intended, in particular, to facilitate the preparation of a revised edition of the statutes.

The act was largely mirrored by the Statute Law Revision (Ireland) Act 1872 (35 & 36 Vict. c. 98), which repealed for Ireland statutes from the Magna Carta until 1495 that were extended to Ireland by the passage of Poynings' Act 1495 (10 Hen. 7. c. 22 (I)).

As of 2026, the act remains partly in force in the United Kingdom.

== Background ==
In the United Kingdom, acts of Parliament remain in force until expressly repealed. Blackstone's Commentaries on the Laws of England, published in the late 18th-century, raised questions about the system and structure of the common law and the poor drafting and disorder of the existing statute book.

From 1810 to 1825, The Statutes of the Realm was published, providing the first authoritative collection of acts. The first statute law revision act was not passed until 1856 with the Repeal of Obsolete Statutes Act 1856 (19 & 20 Vict. c. 64). This approach — focusing on removing obsolete laws from the statute book followed by consolidation — was proposed by Peter Locke King MP, who had been highly critical of previous commissions' approaches, expenditures, and lack of results.

Previous statute law revision acts
Year passed	Title	Citation	Effect
1861	Statute Law Revision Act 1861	24 & 25 Vict. c. 101	Repealed or amended over 800 enactments

== Passage ==
The Statute Law Revision Bill had its first reading in the House of Lords on 12 June 1863. In his speech introducing the bill, Constantine Phipps, 1st Marquess of Normanby, explained that the bill aimed at revising and "expurgating" (removing outdated or redundant sections) of English statute law from its inception to the 18th century. The bill was supported by two former Lord Chancellors, Henry Brougham, 1st Baron Brougham and Robert Rolfe, 1st Baron Cranworth, who also cautioned against future efforts to consolidate the common law. The bill had its second reading in the House of Lords on 7 July 1863, and was committed to a committee of the whole house, which met and reported without amendment on 9 July 1863. The bill had its third reading in the House of Lords on 10 July 1863 and passed, with amendments.

The bill had its first reading in the House of Commons on 13 July 1863 and second reading in the House of Commons on 16 July 1863 and was committed to a committee of the whole house, with amendments. The Committee met and reported on 23 July 1863, with amendments. The amended bill was considered by the House of Commons on 23 July 1863, and had its third reading in the House of Commons on 24 July 1863 and passed, with amendments. The bill was criticised by John Pope Hennessy MP and Frederick Lygon, 6th Earl Beauchamp MP for repealing some statutes relating to Ireland, which were not in the Irish Statute Book and for repealing the Magna Carta. These objections were described by the Solicitor General as "utterly baseless".

The amended bill was considered and agreed to by the House of Lords on 25 July 1863.

The bill was granted royal assent on 28 July 1863.

== Subsequent developments ==
The act was intended, in particular, to facilitate the preparation of a revised edition of the statutes.

The territorial extent of the act was limited to England (including Wales and Berwick), meaning that those acts passed before Poynings' Act 1495 (10 Hen. 7. c. 22 (I)) were not completely repealed for the United Kingdom until the Statute Law (Ireland) Revision Act 1872 (35 & 36 Vict. c. 98).

The schedule to the act was repealed by section 1 of, and the schedule to, the Statute Law Revision Act 1893 (56 & 57 Vict. c. 14), which came into force on 9 June 1893.

The enactments which were repealed (whether for the whole or any part of the United Kingdom) by the act were repealed so far as they extended to the Isle of Man by section 1(1) of, and schedule 1 to, the Statute Law Revision (Isle of Man) Act 1991, which came into force on 25 July 1991.

== Repealed enactments ==
Section 1 of the act repealed 1,658 enactments, listed in the schedule to the act, across six categories: (Note: The Note of the bill, unlike the schedule, gives commentary on each act, noting any earlier repeals and the reason for the new repeal)

- Expired
- Spent
- Repealed in general terms
- Virtually repealed
- Superseded
- Obsolete

Section 1 of the act included several safeguards to ensure that the repeal does not negatively affect existing rights or ongoing legal matters. Specifically, any legal rights, privileges, or remedies already obtained under the repealed laws, as well as any legal proceedings or principles established by them, remain unaffected. Section 1 of the act also ensured that repealed enactments that have been incorporated into other laws would continue to have legal effect in those contexts. Moreover, the repeal would not revive any former rights, offices, or jurisdictions that had already been abolished.

Section 2 of the act specified that the act extended to England (including Wales and Berwick) only.

== See also ==
- Statute Law Revision Act
