= 2nd Parliament of Elizabeth I =

16th-century Parliament of England

The 2nd Parliament of Queen Elizabeth I was summoned by Queen Elizabeth I of England on 10 November 1562 and assembled on 11 January 1563. The stated intentions of summoning the Parliament were similar to that of Elizabeth's first parliament i.e. to resolve the religious issue (the Elizabethan Settlement passed by the previous parliament had not so far been executed) and to approve funds for the defence of the realm (particularly the northern border with Scotland). Thomas Williams, sitting for Exeter, was elected Speaker of the House of Commons.

A subsidy committee was set up to deal with the budgetary issue. Deputations were again, as during the 1st Parliament, sent to the Queen exhorting her to consider marriage but to no avail. Parliament meanwhile passed major statutes for regulating land usage, poor relief, regulation of wages and apprenticeship and the maintenance of the navy. A total of 31 public and 19 private measures had been enacted by the end of the first parliamentary session in April 1563.

The second session was delayed until September 1566. The death of Speaker Williams in the interim required the House to elect a new Speaker; Richard Onslow was reluctantly chosen to succeed him. Apart from more discussion about the Royal Succession, very little was achieved in the second session other than to resolve the question of supply i.e. the funds allocated to the Crown. By the dissolution of Parliament on 2 January 1567 a further 22 public and 12 private Acts had been passed into law.

== Notable acts of the Parliament ==
- Poor Act 1562
- The Act touching Badgers of Corn and Drovers of Cattle, to be licensed
- Highways Act 1562
- Witchcraft Act 1562
- Lord Keeper Act 1562
- Writ De Excommunicato Capiendo Act 1562
- Statute of Artificers 1563

== See also ==
- List of parliaments of England
- List of acts of the 1st session of the 2nd Parliament of Queen Elizabeth I
- List of acts of the 2nd session of the 2nd Parliament of Queen Elizabeth I
