= Repeal of Certain Laws Act 1772 =

Act of the Parliament of Great Britain

- Act of Parliament
- Parliament of Great Britain
- Long title: An Act for repealing several laws therein mentioned against Badgers, Engrossers, Forestallers and Regraters and for indemnifying Persons against Prosecutions for Offences committed against the said Acts.
- Citation: 12 Geo. 3. c. 71
- Territorial extent: Great Britain

Dates
- Royal assent: 9 June 1772
- Commencement: 21 January 1772 (Note: Start of session.)
- Repealed: 21 August 1871

Other legislation
- Amends: See § Repealed enactments
- Repeals/revokes: See § Repealed enactments
- Amended by: Forestalling, Regrating, etc. Act 1844
- Repealed by: Statute Law Revision Act 1871

Status: Repealed

Text of statute as originally enacted

The Repeal of Certain Laws Act 1772 (12 Geo. 3. c. 71) was an act of the Parliament of Great Britain that repealed for Great Britain statutes against forestallers and engrossers, including the Forestallers Act 1551 (5 & 6 Edw. 6. c. 14).

== Background ==
Several statutes included, related to corn, meal, flour, cattle and sundry and others, had been found to have prevented free trade of those commodities, causing the price to increase:

WHEREAS it hath been found by experience, that the restraints laid by several statutes upon the dealing in corn, meal, flour, cattle, and sundry other sorts of victuals, by preventing a free trade in the said commodities, have a tendency to discourage the growth and to enhance the price of the same; which statutes, if put in execution, would bring great distress upon the inhabitants of many parts of this kingdom, and in particular upon those of the cities of London and Westminster.

== Repealed enactments ==
Section 1 of the act repealed 6 enactments, listed in the section. Section 1 of the act also repealed any subsequent acts that were created to enforce those original acts.

Section 2 of the act voided all existing and future legal proceedings that were commenced under the repealed acts, ensuring that no person could be prosecuted under these former laws regardless of any contrary statutes.

Citation	Short title	Description	Extent of repeal
3 & 4 Edw. 6. c. 21	Butter and Cheese Act 1549	An act, made in the third and fourth year of King Edward the Sixth, intituled, An act for the buying and felling of butter and cheese.	The whole act.
5 & 6 Edw. 6. c. 14	Forestallers Act 1551	An act, made in the fifth and sixth year of King Edward the Sixth, intituled, An act against regrators, forestallers, and engrossers.	The whole act.
2 & 3 Ph. & M. c. 3	Increase of Cattle Act 1555	An act made in the third year of Philip and Mary, intituled, An act for the buying of milch kine, and for breeding and rearing of calves	The whole act.
5 Eliz. c. 12	Corn, etc. Act 1562	An act, made in the fifth year of Queen Elizabeth, intituled, An act touching badgers of corn, and drovers of cattle, to be licensed.	The whole act.
15 Cha. 2. c. 8	Butchers Act 1663	An act, made in the fifteenth year of King Charles the Second, intituled, An act to prevent the felling of live fat cattle by butchers.	The whole act.
5 Ann.	Continuance of Laws Act 1706	An act, made in the fifth year of Queen Anne, intituled, An act for continuing the laws therein mentioned relating to the poor, and to the buying and felling of cattle in Smithfield, and for suppressing of piracy.	As relates to butchers felling cattle alive or dead within the cities of London and Westminster, or within ten miles thereof.

== Subsequent developments ==
The repeals in the act were found not to have been effectual, because of repeated prohibitions in previous acts. In 1800, John Rusby was indicted for having bought ninety quarters of oats at 41 shillings per quarter and selling thirty of them at 43 shillings the same day. Lord Kenyon, the presiding judge, argued strongly against the repealing act, and addressed the jury strongly against the accused. Rusby was heavily fined, but, on appeal, the court was equally divided as to whether engrossing, forestalling and regrating were still offences at common law.

The Forestalling, Regrating, etc. Act 1844 (7 & 8 Vict. c. 24) extended the act to Ireland and repealed 19 other acts passed between the reigns of Henry III and Edward VI and extending repeals by the act to Ireland.

The whole act was repealed by section 1 of, and the schedule to, the Statute Law Revision Act 1871 (34 & 35 Vict. c. 116), which came into force on 21 August 1871.
