= List of acts of the Parliament of Scotland from 1555 =

This is a list of acts of the Parliament of Scotland for the year 1555.

It lists acts of Parliament of the old Parliament of Scotland, that was merged with the old Parliament of England to form the Parliament of Great Britain, by the Union with England Act 1707 (c. 7).

For other years, see list of acts of the Parliament of Scotland. For the period after 1707, see list of acts of the Parliament of Great Britain.

== 1555 ==
The 6th parliament of Mary.

Short title, or popular name	Citation	Royal assent
Long title
Church Act 1555 (repealed)	1555 c. 1 (Note: This is the citation in the Record Edition.) — (Note: This act is not listed in the Duodecimal Edition.)	20 June 1555
Of the fredome of halie kirk. Of the freedom of the holy church. (Repealed by Statute Law Revision (Scotland) Act 1906 (6 Edw. 7. c. 38))
Reversions Act 1555 (repealed)	1555 c. 2; 1555 c. 29 (Note: This is the citation in the Duodecimal Edition.)	20 June 1555
Anent the making and delivering of reversiounis. Concerning the making and delivery of reversions. (Repealed by Statute Law Revision (Scotland) Act 1906 (6 Edw. 7. c. 38))
Lands Redemption Act 1555 still in force	1555 c. 3; 1555 c. 30	20 June 1555
Anent warning fra redemit landis and the pane for non removing. Concerning warning from redeemed lands, and the pain for not removing therefrom.
Murder Act 1555 (repealed)	1555 c. 4; 1555 c. 31	20 June 1555
Anent the additioun maid to the act of slauchters. (Note: Murder Act 1487 (October c. 5)); Concerning the addition made to the act of murder. (Repealed by Statute Law Revision (Scotland) Act 1906 (6 Edw. 7. c. 38))
Citation (No. 1) Act 1555 (repealed)	1555 c. 5; 1555 c. 32	20 June 1555
Anent proces to be had aganis persounis passand furth of the realme. Concerning the process to be had against persons passing out of the realm. (Repealed by Statute Law Revision (Scotland) Act 1906 (6 Edw. 7. c. 38))
Citation Act 1555 (repealed)	1555 c. 6; 1555 c. 33	20 June 1555
The ordour for summoning of parteis to compeir befoir the Justice or uthers jugeis. The order for summoning parties to appear before the Justice or other judges. (Repealed by Statute Law (Repeals) Act 1986 (c. 12))
Saines Act 1555 (repealed)	1555 c. 7; 1555 c. 34	20 June 1555
Anent the geving of sesingis. Concerning the giving of sasines. (Repealed by Statute Law Revision (Scotland) Act 1906 (6 Edw. 7. c. 38))
Minors Act 1555 (repealed)	1555 c. 8; 1555 c. 35	20 June 1555
Anent the ordour for geving of curatouris to minouris. Concerning the order for giving curators to minors. (Repealed by Administration of Justice (Scotland) Act 1933 (23 & 24 Geo. 5. c. 41))
Lent Act 1555 (repealed)	1555 c. 9; 1555 c. 36	20 June 1555
Anent the eitting of flesche in lentrene and uthers dayis forbiddin. Concerning the eating of meat during Lent, and other forbidden days. (Repealed by Statute Law Revision (Scotland) Act 1906 (6 Edw. 7. c. 38))
Reversions (No. 2) Act 1555 (repealed)	1555 c. 10; 1555 c. 37	20 June 1555
Anent reversiounis for redemption and outquyting of landis. Concerning reversions for redemption and unencumbering of lands. (Repealed by Statute Law Revision (Scotland) Act 1906 (6 Edw. 7. c. 38))
Resignations Act 1555 (repealed)	1555 c. 11; 1555 c. 38	20 June 1555
Anent resignatiounis of lordis ad perpetuam remanentiam. Concerning resignations of lords to remain in perpetuity. (Repealed by Statute Law Revision (Scotland) Act 1906 (6 Edw. 7. c. 38))
Removings Act 1555 (repealed)	1555 c. 12; 1555 c. 39	20 June 1555
Anent the maner of the warning of tennentis to flit and remove fra landis mylnis fischingis and possessiounis quhatsumever. Concerning the manner of warning of tenants to flit and remove from lands mills, fishings and possessions whatsoever. (Repealed by Statute Law Revision (Scotland) Act 1964 (c. 80))
Murders Act 1555 (repealed)	1555 c. 13 —	20 June 1555
Anent the punischement of slauchters daylie committit of parteis persewand and defendand thair actiounis. (Repealed by Statute Law Revision (Scotland) Act 1906 (6 Edw. 7. c. 38))
Export of Food Act 1555 (repealed)	1555 c. 14; 1555 c. 40	20 June 1555
Anent the having of victuallis talloun or flesche furth of the realme. (Repealed by Statute Law Revision (Scotland) Act 1906 (6 Edw. 7. c. 38))
Criminal Procedure Act 1555 (repealed)	1555 c. 15; 1555 c. 41	20 June 1555
Anent the cumming to the bar for defence or persute in criminall causis. (Repealed by Statute Law Revision (Scotland) Act 1906 (6 Edw. 7. c. 38))
Civil Procedure Act 1555 (repealed)	1555 c. 16; 1555 c. 42	20 June 1555
Anent the ressaving of nulliteis be way of exceptiounis or replyis. (Repealed by Statute Law Revision (Scotland) Act 1964 (c. 80))
Bonds of Manrent Act 1555 (repealed)	1555 c. 17; 1555 c. 43	20 June 1555
Anent liggis and bandis of manrent and mantenance. (Repealed by Statute Law Revision (Scotland) Act 1906 (6 Edw. 7. c. 38))
Notaries Act 1555 (repealed)	1555 c. 18; 1555 c. 43	20 June 1555
Anent the admissioun of notaris—the examining and marking of their protocoll bukis and the geving of instrumentis be notaris. (Repealed by Statute Law Revision (Scotland) Act 1906 (6 Edw. 7. c. 38))
Export to England Act 1555 (repealed)	1555 c. 19; 1555 c. 45	20 June 1555
Anent the carying of woll or uther stapill gudis customabill furth of this realme. (Repealed by Statute Law Revision (Scotland) Act 1906 (6 Edw. 7. c. 38))
Weights and Measures Act 1555 (repealed)	1555 c. 20 —	20 June 1555
Anent the making of an universall wecht and ane universall mesoure. (Repealed by Statute Law Revision (Scotland) Act 1906 (6 Edw. 7. c. 38))
Sasines Act 1555 (repealed)	1555 c. 21; 1555 c. 46	20 June 1555
Anent the giving of sesingis upone preceptis that passis not furth of the chancellarie. (Repealed by Statute Law Revision (Scotland) Act 1906 (6 Edw. 7. c. 38))
Perjury Act 1555 (repealed)	1555 c. 22; 1555 c. 47	20 June 1555
Anent the punischement of fals witnes. (Repealed by Statute Law Revision (Scotland) Act 1906 (6 Edw. 7. c. 38))
Not public and general	1555 c. 23 —	20 June 1555
Anent the wod of Falkland.
Burghs Act 1555 (repealed)	1555 c. 24; 1555 c. 49	20 June 1555
Ratificatioun of the privilegeis and actis of Parliament in favouris of burrowis. (Repealed by Statute Law Revision (Scotland) Act 1906 (6 Edw. 7. c. 38))
Game Act 1555 (repealed)	1555 c. 25; 1555 c. 51	20 June 1555
Anent the executioun of the actis maid for stanching of the slaying of wylde foulis and wylde beistis with additioun. (Repealed by Statute Law Revision (Scotland) Act 1964 (c. 80))
Craftsmen Act 1555 (repealed)	1555 c. 26; 1555 c. 52	20 June 1555
Anent the dischargeing of dekinnis of craftis and for chesing of visitouris. (Repealed by Statute Law Revision (Scotland) Act 1906 (6 Edw. 7. c. 38))
Highways Act (Scotland) 1555 (repealed)	1555 c. 27; 1555 c. 53	20 June 1555
Anent commoun hie gaittis for passage fra burrowis or cumming thairto. (Repealed by Statute Law Revision (Scotland) Act 1906 (6 Edw. 7. c. 38))
Sea Fishing Act 1555 (repealed)	1555 c. 28; 1555 c. 54	20 June 1555
Anent the discharge of exactiounis upon the burrowis of the west partis for making of hering. (Repealed by Statute Law Revision (Scotland) Act 1906 (6 Edw. 7. c. 38))
Hornings Act 1555 (repealed)	1555 c. 29; 1555 c. 55	20 June 1555
Anent the proces upon kirkmen for non payment of their taxtis. (Repealed by Statute Law Revision (Scotland) Act 1906 (6 Edw. 7. c. 38))
Lambs Act 1555 (repealed)	1555 c. 30 —	20 June 1555
Anent the slaaing of lambis. (Repealed by Statute Law Revision (Scotland) Act 1906 (6 Edw. 7. c. 38))
Ferries Act 1555 (repealed)	1555 c. 31 —	20 June 1555
Anent feryaris. (Repealed by Statute Law Revision (Scotland) Act 1906 (6 Edw. 7. c. 38))
Chickens Act 1555 (repealed)	1555 c. 32 —	20 June 1555
Anent the slaaing of poutis. (Repealed by Statute Law Revision (Scotland) Act 1906 (6 Edw. 7. c. 38))
Woods Act 1555 (repealed)	1555 c. 33 —	20 June 1555
Anentis planting of woddis forrestis orchardis and parkis. (Repealed by Statute Law Revision (Scotland) Act 1906 (6 Edw. 7. c. 38))
Goldsmiths Act 1555 (repealed)	1555 c. 34; 1555 c. 56	20 June 1555
Anent the fraude done be goldsmythis. (Repealed by Statute Law Revision (Scotland) Act 1906 (6 Edw. 7. c. 38))
Wine, Salt, etc. Act 1555 (repealed)	1555 c. 35; 1555 c. 57	20 June 1555
Anent the dispositioun of wyne salt and tymmer brocht in to the realme. (Repealed by Forestalling, Regrating, etc. Act 1844 (7 & 8 Vict. c. 24))
Game (No. 2) Act 1555 (repealed)	1555 c. 36; 1555 c. 58	20 June 1555
Anent the executioun of the actis anentis the steiling of halkis hundis pertrikis dukis and slauchter of dais rais hunting of deir taking of cuningis and foulis. (Repealed by Statute Law Revision (Scotland) Act 1906 (6 Edw. 7. c. 38))
Shipping Trade Act 1555 (repealed)	1555 c. 37; 1555 c. 59	20 June 1555
Anent the executioun of the act anentis the cumming of schippis to fre burrowis at the west seyis with additioun. (Repealed by Statute Law Revision (Scotland) Act 1906 (6 Edw. 7. c. 38))
Beggars Act 1555 (repealed)	1555 c. 38 —	20 June 1555
Anent the executioun of the act for stanching of maisterfull beggaris. (Repealed by Statute Law Revision (Scotland) Act 1906 (6 Edw. 7. c. 38))
Treason Act 1555 (repealed)	1555 c. 39; 1555 c. 60	20 June 1555
Aganis thame that rasis murmuris sclanders and seditioun betuix the liegis of this realme and the maist Christin Kingis liegis. (Repealed by Statute Law Revision (Scotland) Act 1906 (6 Edw. 7. c. 38))
Robert Hood, etc. Act 1555 (repealed)	1555 c. 40; 1555 c. 61	20 June 1555
Anent the chesing of sic ane personage as Robert Hude Lytill Johne Abbottis of unressoun or Quenis of Maij. (Repealed by Statute Law Revision (Scotland) Act 1906 (6 Edw. 7. c. 38))
Queen's Revocation Act 1555 (repealed)	1555 c. 41; 1555 c. 28	20 June 1555
Registratioun of our Soverane Ladyis revocation subscrivit with hir hienes hand at Fontane Bellew of the date the xxv day of Aprill the yeir of God ane thousand fyve hundreth fyftie fyve yeiris. (Repealed by Statute Law Revision (Scotland) Act 1906 (6 Edw. 7. c. 38))

=== Sources ===
- Alexander, William (1841). "Acta Parliamentorum Mariæ Reginæ". An Abridgement of the Acts of the Parliaments of Scotland. Edinburgh: Adam and Charles Black. pp. A18 – A19 – via Google Books.
- Alexander, William (1841). "Acta Parliamentorum Mariæ Reginæ". An Abridgement of the Acts of the Parliaments of Scotland. Edinburgh: Adam and Charles Black. pp. A18 – A19 – via Google Books.
- Chronological Table of the Statutes. London: Her Majesty's Stationery Office. 1972. pp. 1332–1333 – via Google Books.
- "Acts of the Old Scottish Parliament: 1555". legislation.gov.uk. The National Archives.
- "Index of Statutes: Mary I (1542-1567)". Records of the Parliaments of Scotland to 1707. University of St Andrews.

== See also ==
- List of legislation in the United Kingdom
- Records of the Parliaments of Scotland
