= List of acts of the Parliament of Scotland from 1535 =

This is a list of acts of the Parliament of Scotland for the year 1535.

It lists acts of Parliament of the old Parliament of Scotland, that was merged with the old Parliament of England to form the Parliament of Great Britain, by the Union with England Act 1707 (c. 7).

For other years, see list of acts of the Parliament of Scotland. For the period after 1707, see list of acts of the Parliament of Great Britain.

== 1535 ==
The 4th parliament of James V, held in Edinburgh from 7 June 1535.

Short title, or popular name	Citation	Royal assent
Long title
Church Act 1535 (repealed)	1535 c. 1 (Note: This is the citation in the Record Edition.) — (Note: This act is not listed in the Duodecimal Edition.)	12 June 1535
Libertie of Halikirk. Liberty of the Holy Church. (Repealed by Statute Law Revision (Scotland) Act 1906 (6 Edw. 7. c. 38))
Heresy Act 1535 (repealed)	1535 c. 2 —	12 June 1535
Aganis heretikis—For eschewing of heresy within this realme and the panis tharof. Against heretics: For eschewing of heresy within this realm and the pains thereof. (Repealed by Statute Law Revision (Scotland) Act 1906 (6 Edw. 7. c. 38))
Sentence of Cursing Act 1535 (repealed)	1535 c. 3; 1535 c. 9 (Note: This is the citation in the Duodecimal Edition.)	12 June 1535
Aganis thame that sustenis the processe of cursing be the space of xl dais. Against those who sustain the process of cursing by the space of 40 days. (Repealed by Statute Law Revision (Scotland) Act 1906 (6 Edw. 7. c. 38))
General Provincial Council Act 1535 (repealed)	1535 c. 4 —	12 June 1535
For ane generale provinciale consale to be had. For a general provincial council to be held. (Repealed by Statute Law Revision (Scotland) Act 1906 (6 Edw. 7. c. 38))
Supply Act 1535 (repealed)	1535 c. 5 —	12 June 1535
Taxt grantit to the kingis grace. Tax granted to the king's grace. (Repealed by Statute Law Revision (Scotland) Act 1906 (6 Edw. 7. c. 38))
Coin Act 1535 (repealed)	1535 c. 6 —	12 June 1535
The mater of money and cunye. The matter of money and coin. (Repealed by Statute Law Revision (Scotland) Act 1906 (6 Edw. 7. c. 38))
Afforestration Act 1535 (repealed)	1535 c. 7; 1535 c. 10	12 June 1535
Off planting of woddis forestis and orchartis. Of planting of woods, forests and orchards. (Repealed by Statute Law Revision (Scotland) Act 1906 (6 Edw. 7. c. 38))
Woods and Muirburn Act 1535 (repealed)	1535 c. 8; 1535 c. 11	12 June 1535
The panis of the distroyaris of woddis and thaim that makis mureburn in forbodin tyme. The pains of the destroyers of woods and burning of moorland in forbidden times. (Repealed by Statute Law Revision (Scotland) Act 1906 (6 Edw. 7. c. 38))
Forests Act 1535 (repealed)	1535 c. 9; 1535 c. 12	12 June 1535
For keping of forestis. For keeping of forests. (Repealed by Statute Law Revision (Scotland) Act 1906 (6 Edw. 7. c. 38))
Deer Act 1535 (repealed)	1535 c. 10 —	12 June 1535
For slauchter of dais &c. For slaughter of does, etc. (Repealed by Statute Law Revision (Scotland) Act 1906 (6 Edw. 7. c. 38))
Dovecots, etc. Act 1535 (repealed)	1535 c. 11; 1535 c. 13	12 June 1535
Off brekaris of dowkatis yardis cunygaris parkis and stankis. Of breakers of dovecotes, yards, rabbit-warrens, parks and ponds. (Repealed by Statute Law Revision (Scotland) Act 1906 (6 Edw. 7. c. 38))
Orchards Act 1535 (repealed)	1535 c. 12 —	12 June 1535
Off brekaris of yardis and orchartis. Of breakers of yards and orchards. (Repealed by Statute Law Revision (Scotland) Act 1906 (6 Edw. 7. c. 38))
Hares Act 1535 (repealed)	1535 c. 13; 1535 c. 14	12 June 1535
Of slaying of haris in forbodin tyme. Of slaying of hares in forbidden time. (Repealed by Statute Law Revision (Scotland) Act 1906 (6 Edw. 7. c. 38))
Liferent Caution Act 1535 still in force	1535 c. 14; 1535 c. 15	12 June 1535
The remeid for distructioune of housis places woddis forestis orchartis yardis and hanyngis of landis fallin in ward. The remedy for destruction of houses, places, woods, forests, orchards, yards and enclosures of land fallen in ward.
Supply (No. 2) Act 1535 (repealed)	1535 c. 15 —	12 June 1535
Anent ane contributioun grantit to the kingis grace be the thre Estatis. Regarding the contribution granted to the king's grace by the three Estates. (Repealed by Statute Law Revision (Scotland) Act 1906 (6 Edw. 7. c. 38))
Salmon Act 1535 (repealed)	1535 c. 16; 1535 c. 16	12 June 1535
Off red fische smoltis and slaying of salmond in forbodin tyme. Of red fish, smolts and slaying of salmon in forbidden time. (Repealed by Statute Law Revision (Scotland) Act 1906 (6 Edw. 7. c. 38))
Salmon (No. 2) Act 1535 (repealed)	1535 c. 17; 1535 c. 17	12 June 1535
Off cruvis and yaris. Of cruives and yairs. (Repealed by Statute Law Revision (Scotland) Act 1906 (6 Edw. 7. c. 38))
Sea Fishing Act 1535 (repealed)	1535 c. 18 —	12 June 1535
Of buschis for fisching. Of boats for fishing. (Repealed by Statute Law Revision (Scotland) Act 1906 (6 Edw. 7. c. 38))
Wapinschaws Act 1535 (repealed)	1535 c. 19 —	12 June 1535
Of walpinschawingis. Of musters. (Repealed by Statute Law Revision (Scotland) Act 1906 (6 Edw. 7. c. 38))
Artillery Act 1535 (repealed)	1535 c. 20 —	12 June 1535
Hagbutis and utheris small artalyery to be furnest within the realme. Hackbuts and other small artillery to be furnished within the realm. (Repealed by Statute Law Revision (Scotland) Act 1906 (6 Edw. 7. c. 38))
Artillery (No. 2) Act 1535 (repealed)	1535 c. 21 —	12 June 1535
That merchandis bring hame hagbutis culveringis calmes powder and hernes. That merchants bring home hackbuts, culverins, cams, powder and harness. (Repealed by Statute Law Revision (Scotland) Act 1906 (6 Edw. 7. c. 38))
Border Strongholds Act 1535 (repealed)	1535 c. 22 —	12 June 1535
For bigging of strenthis on the bordouris. For building of strengths on the borders. (Repealed by Statute Law Revision (Scotland) Act 1906 (6 Edw. 7. c. 38))
Travellers Act 1535 (repealed)	1535 c. 23; 1535 c. 18	12 June 1535
Provisioun for ostillaris and travellaris throw the cuntre. Provision for innkeepers and travellers through the country. (Repealed by Statute Law Revision (Scotland) Act 1906 (6 Edw. 7. c. 38))
Horses Act 1535 (repealed)	1535 c. 24; 1535 c. 19	12 June 1535
That na man by Inglis hors or bartour for thame and that all man havand stude places gar plenys the samyn. That no man buy English horses or barter for them, and that all men having stud places to plenish the same. (Repealed by Statute Law Revision (Scotland) Act 1906 (6 Edw. 7. c. 38))
Trade with England Act 1535 (repealed)	1535 c. 25; 1535 c. 20	12 June 1535
That na man sell nolt schepe &c. to Inglismen nor send vittalis fische or salt in Ingland. That no man sell nolt, sheep to Englishmen nor send victuals, fish or salt into England. (Repealed by Statute Law Revision (Scotland) Act 1906 (6 Edw. 7. c. 38))
Forestallers Act 1535 (repealed)	1535 c. 26; 1535 c. 21	12 June 1535
Off forstallaris. Of forestallers. (Repealed by Forestalling, Regrating, etc. Act 1844 (7 & 8 Vict. c. 24))
King's Rents Act 1535 (repealed)	1535 c. 27 —	12 June 1535
For inbringing of the kingis grace propirtie and casualite. For bringing in of the property and casualty of his grace the king. (Repealed by Statute Law Revision (Scotland) Act 1906 (6 Edw. 7. c. 38))
Murder Act 1535 (repealed)	1535 c. 28 —	12 June 1535
For slauchter with additioun. For slaughter, with an addition. (Repealed by Statute Law Revision (Scotland) Act 1906 (6 Edw. 7. c. 38))
Beggars Act 1535 (repealed)	1535 c. 29; 1535 c. 22	12 June 1535
For the stanching of maisterfull beggaris with additioun. For the staunching of masterful beggars, with an addition. (Repealed by Statute Law Revision (Scotland) Act 1906 (6 Edw. 7. c. 38))
Sanctuary Act 1535 (repealed)	1535 c. 30; 1535 c. 23	12 June 1535
The remeid for delivering of them that fleis to girth. The remedy for delivering those that flee to girth. (Repealed by Statute Law Revision (Scotland) Act 1906 (6 Edw. 7. c. 38))
Burghs Act 1535 (repealed)	1535 c. 31 —	12 June 1535
The privelegis of burrowis. The privileges of burghs. (Repealed by Statute Law Revision (Scotland) Act 1906 (6 Edw. 7. c. 38))
Foreign Shipping Trade Act 1535 (repealed)	1535 c. 32; 1535 c. 24	12 June 1535
Anentis merchandis that salis incontrar the actis maid of before. Regarding merchants that sail in contradiction to the acts previously made. (Repealed by Statute Law Revision (Scotland) Act 1906 (6 Edw. 7. c. 38))
Foreign Shipping Trade (No. 2) Act 1535 (repealed)	1535 c. 33; 1535 c. 25	12 June 1535
That na schip sale with stable gudis fra Symonis day and Jude (Note: The feast of Saints Simon and Jude is on 28 October.) quhill candilmes. (Note: Candlemas is on 2 February.); That no ship sail with staple goods from Simon and Jude Day until Candlemas. (Repealed by Statute Law Revision (Scotland) Act 1906 (6 Edw. 7. c. 38))
Foreign Shipping Trade (No. 3) Act 1535 (repealed)	1535 c. 34; 1535 c. 31	12 June 1535
That na man sale in Flandris bot twise in the yeir. That no man sail to Flanders but twice a year. (Repealed by Statute Law Revision (Scotland) Act 1906 (6 Edw. 7. c. 38))
Burgh Officers Act 1535 (repealed)	1535 c. 35; 1535 c. 26	12 June 1535
Off chesing of officiaris in burgh and bringing of thare comptis of thare commoun gudis yerelie to the chekker Of choosing burgh officers and bringing their accounts of their common goods yearly to the exchequer. (Repealed by Statute Law Revision (Scotland) Act 1906 (6 Edw. 7. c. 38))
Burghs (No. 2) Act 1535 (repealed)	1535 c. 36; 1535 c. 27	12 June 1535
That na man truble or molest the provest ballies aldermen officiaris and utheris induellaris in the burgh. That no man trouble or molest the provost, bailies, aldermen, officers and other indwellers in the burgh. (Repealed by Statute Law Revision (Scotland) Act 1906 (6 Edw. 7. c. 38))
Lord Chancellor's Sittings Act 1535 (repealed)	1535 c. 37 —	12 June 1535
That my lord chancellar within ane certane of lordis quham plesis the kingis grace to depute with him sitt wolkly ane day to trete on materis concernyng the commoun wele. That my lord chancellor, with a certain number of lords who it pleases the king's grace to deputise with him, sit one day weekly to treat on matters concerning the common good. (Repealed by Statute Law Revision (Scotland) Act 1906 (6 Edw. 7. c. 38))
Hornings Act 1535 (repealed)	1535 c. 38; 1535 c. 32	17 June 1535
Interpretatioun of the lawis tuiching the rychtis of superiouris to the males and dewiteis of the landiş of thaim that hes bene yeir and day at the horne. Interpretation of the laws touching the rights of superiors to the mails and duties of the lands of those that have been a year and a day at the horn. (Repealed by Statute Law Revision (Scotland) Act 1906 (6 Edw. 7. c. 38))
Criminal Procedure Act 1535 (repealed)	1535 c. 39; 1535 cc. 33-35	17 June 1535
That Justice aris and proces be peremptoure at the secund court and how crown aris sall mak thair arrestment and that gret crymes be callit at perticuler diettis with the panis of thame that complenis wranguislie. That justice ayres and processes be peremptorily at the second court, and how crownars shall make their arrests, and that great crimes be called at particular diets with the pains of those who complain wrongfully. (Repealed by Statute Law Revision (Scotland) Act 1906 (6 Edw. 7. c. 38))
Theft Act 153 (repealed)	1535 c. 40 —	17 June 1535
For eschewing of thift stouth and reiff. For eschewing of theft, stealing and robbery. (Repealed by Statute Law Revision (Scotland) Act 1906 (6 Edw. 7. c. 38))
Peace of the Country Act 1535 (repealed)	1535 c. 41; 1535 c. 28	17 June 1535
That na man ryde bot in sobir maner. That no man ride but in a sober manner. (Repealed by Statute Law Revision (Scotland) Act 1906 (6 Edw. 7. c. 38))
Maltmakers Act 1535 (repealed)	1535 c. 42; 1535 c. 29	17 June 1535
For maltmakaris. For maltmakers. (Repealed by Statute Law Revision (Scotland) Act 1906 (6 Edw. 7. c. 38))
Craftsmen within Burgh Act 1535 (repealed)	1535 c. 43; 1535 c. 30	17 June 1535
Of craftismen browstaris sellaris of salt and vittale within burgh. Of craftsmen, brewers, sellers of salt and victual within the burgh. (Repealed by Statute Law Revision (Scotland) Act 1906 (6 Edw. 7. c. 38))

=== Sources ===
- Alexander, William (1841). "Acta Parliamentorum Regis Jacobi Quinti". An Abridgement of the Acts of the Parliaments of Scotland. Edinburgh: Adam and Charles Black. pp. A15 – A16 – via Google Books.
- Alexander, William (1841). "Acta Parliamentorum Regis Jacobi Quinti". An Abridgement of the Acts of the Parliaments of Scotland. Edinburgh: Adam and Charles Black. pp. A15 – A16 – via Google Books.
- Chronological Table of the Statutes. London: Her Majesty's Stationery Office. 1972. p. 1329 – via Google Books.
- "Acts of the Old Scottish Parliament: 1535". legislation.gov.uk. The National Archives.
- "Index of Statutes: James V (1513-1542)". Records of the Parliaments of Scotland to 1707. University of St Andrews.

== See also ==
- List of legislation in the United Kingdom
- Records of the Parliaments of Scotland
