= List of acts of the Parliament of Scotland from 1540 =

This is a list of acts of the Parliament of Scotland for the year 1540.

It lists acts of Parliament of the old Parliament of Scotland, that was merged with the old Parliament of England to form the Parliament of Great Britain, by the Union with England Act 1707 (c. 7).

For other years, see list of acts of the Parliament of Scotland. For the period after 1707, see list of acts of the Parliament of Great Britain.

== 1540 ==
=== December ===
The 6th parliament of James V, held in Edinburgh from 3 December 1540.

Short title, or popular name	Citation	Royal assent
Long title
Summons of Treason Act 1540 (repealed)	December 1540 c. 1 (Note: This is the citation in the Record Edition.); 1540 c. 69 (Note: This is the citation in the Duodecimal Edition.)	10 December 1540
Declaratioun of parliament giff the kingis grace had actioun or nocht aganis the airis of the thame that committis crime of lese majeste. Declaration of parliament if the king's grace had action or not against the heirs of those that commit crimes of lese-majesty. (Repealed by Statute Law Revision (Scotland) Act 1906 (6 Edw. 7. c. 38))
Ratification of Last Parliament Act 1540 (repealed)	December 1540 c. 2 — (Note: This act is not listed in the Duodecimal Edition.)	10 December 1540
Ratificacioune and pronunciatioune of the actis of the last parliament. Ratification and pronunciation of the acts of the last parliament. (Repealed by Statute Law Revision (Scotland) Act 1906 (6 Edw. 7. c. 38))
Excommunication Act 1540 (repealed)	December 1540 c. 3; 1535 c. 36	10 December 1540
Addicioun to the act of cursing Addition to the act of cursing. (Repealed by Statute Law Revision (Scotland) Act 1906 (6 Edw. 7. c. 38))
King's Revocation Act 1540 (repealed)	December 1540 c. 4; 1540 c. 70	10 December 1540
The kingis grace revocatioune. The revocation of his grace the king. (Repealed by Statute Law Revision (Scotland) Act 1906 (6 Edw. 7. c. 38))
Church Act 1540 (repealed)	December 1540 c. 5 —	10 December 1540
Off fredome of halikirk. Of the freedom of the holy church. (Repealed by Statute Law Revision (Scotland) Act 1906 (6 Edw. 7. c. 38))
Sherriff's Courts Act 1540 (repealed)	December 1540 c. 6; 1540 c. 71	10 December 1540
That the schireffis and utheris officiaris be present personalie at the thre heid courtis. That the sheriffs and other officers be personally present at the three head courts. (Repealed by Statute Law Revision (Scotland) Act 1906 (6 Edw. 7. c. 38))
Civil Procedure Act 1540 (repealed)	December 1540 c. 7; 1540 c. 72	10 December 1540
Off setting of temporale courtis. Of setting of temporal courts. (Repealed by Statute Law Revision (Scotland) Act 1906 (6 Edw. 7. c. 38))
Sheriff's Deputes Act 1540 (repealed)	December 1540 c. 8; 1540 c. 73	10 December 1540
Off deputis to schireffis and uthir officiaris. Of deputies to sheriffs and other officers. (Repealed by Statute Law Revision (Scotland) Act 1906 (6 Edw. 7. c. 38))
Indorsing of Letters Act 1540 (repealed)	December 1540 c. 9; 1540 c. 74	10 December 1540
Anent Indorsing of letters. Regarding Indorsing of letters. (Repealed by Statute Law Revision (Scotland) Act 1906 (6 Edw. 7. c. 38))
Citation Act 1540 still in force	December 1540 c. 10; 1540 c. 75	10 December 1540
The ordour of summoning of all personis In civil actiounes. The order of summoning all persons in civil actions.
Notaries Act 1540 (repealed)	December 1540 c. 11; 1540 c. 76	10 December 1540
Off electioun of Notaris. Of election of notaries. (Repealed by Statute Law Revision (Scotland) Act 1906 (6 Edw. 7. c. 38))
Sasines Act 1540 (repealed)	December 1540 c. 12; 1540 c. 77	10 December 1540
Off geving of sesingis. Of giving of sasines. (Repealed by Statute Law Revision (Scotland) Act 1906 (6 Edw. 7. c. 38))
Notaries (No. 2) Act 1540 (repealed)	December 1540 c. 13; 1540 c. 78	10 December 1540
Off admission of Notaris. Of admission of Notaries. (Repealed by Statute Law Revision (Scotland) Act 1906 (6 Edw. 7. c. 38))
Protocols of Sasines Act 1540 (repealed)	December 1540 c. 14; 1540 c. 79	10 December 1540
That the prothogollis of all sesingis be presentit yerlie to the chekker. That the protocols of all sasines be presented yearly to the exchequer. (Repealed by Statute Law Revision (Scotland) Act 1906 (6 Edw. 7. c. 38))
Perjury Act 1540 (repealed)	December 1540 c. 15; 1540 c. 80	10 December 1540
Off fals notaris and witnessis. Of false notaries and witnesses. (Repealed by Statute Law Revision (Scotland) Act 1906 (6 Edw. 7. c. 38))
Notaries (No. 3) Act 1540 (repealed)	December 1540 c. 16; 1540 c. 81	10 December 1540
Off notaris ordinare in schireff courtis or utherwyis. Of notaries ordinary in sheriff courts and otherwise. (Repealed by Statute Law Revision (Scotland) Act 1906 (6 Edw. 7. c. 38))
Sheriff's Deputes Act 1540 (repealed)	December 1540 c. 17; 1540 c. 82	10 December 1540
Off commissionis gevin in prejudice of the ordiner. Of commissions given in prejudice of the ordinary. (Repealed by Statute Law Revision (Scotland) Act 1906 (6 Edw. 7. c. 38))
Leasing Making Act 1540 (repealed)	December 1540 c. 18; 1540 c. 83	10 December 1540
Off lesing makaris. Of leasing-makers. (Repealed by Statute Law Revision (Scotland) Act 1906 (6 Edw. 7. c. 38))
Crown Lands Act 1540 Not public and general	December 1540 c. 19; 1540 c. 84	10 December 1540
The act of Annexatioun. The act of Annexation.
Procedure in Forfeitures Act 1540 (repealed)	December 1540 c. 20 —	10 December 1540
For ordouring of processis of forfaltouris. For ordering of processes of forfeiture. (Repealed by Statute Law Revision (Scotland) Act 1906 (6 Edw. 7. c. 38))
Wapinschaws Act 1540 (repealed)	December 1540 c. 21; 1540 c. 85	10 December 1540
Wapynschawingis to be twise In the yeir. Musters to be held twice each year. (Repealed by Statute Law Revision (Scotland) Act 1906 (6 Edw. 7. c. 38))
Defence of the Realm Act 1540 (repealed)	December 1540 c. 22; 1540 c. 86	10 December 1540
That the army of Scotland be unhorsit except greit baronis. That the army of Scotland be horseless, except for great barons. (Repealed by Statute Law Revision (Scotland) Act 1906 (6 Edw. 7. c. 38))
Defence of the Realm (No. 2) Act 1540 (repealed)	December 1540 c. 23; 1540 c. 87	10 December 1540
The manere of harnes wapnis and armoure. The manner of harness, weapons and armour. (Repealed by Statute Law Revision (Scotland) Act 1906 (6 Edw. 7. c. 38))
Defence of the Realm (No. 3) Act 1540 (repealed)	December 1540 c. 24; 1540 c. 88	10 December 1540
Off armour conforme to every mannis rent and substance. Of armour according to every man's rent and substance. (Repealed by Statute Law Revision (Scotland) Act 1906 (6 Edw. 7. c. 38))
Defence of the Realm (No. 4) Act 1540 (repealed)	December 1540 c. 25; 1540 c. 89	10 December 1540
That all personis present in wapinschawingis be writtin with the maner of thair armour. That all persons present in musters be written with the manner of their armour. (Repealed by Statute Law Revision (Scotland) Act 1906 (6 Edw. 7. c. 38))
Defence of the Realm (No. 5) Act 1540 (repealed)	December 1540 c. 26; 1540 c. 90	10 December 1540
The premunitioun of wapinschawingis. The notice period of muster. (Repealed by Statute Law Revision (Scotland) Act 1906 (6 Edw. 7. c. 38))
Defence of the Realm (No. 6) Act 1540 (repealed)	December 1540 c. 27; 1540 c. 91	10 December 1540
Off chesing of capitanis in every parrochyne. Of choosing of captains in every parish. (Repealed by Statute Law Revision (Scotland) Act 1906 (6 Edw. 7. c. 38))
Remission Act 1540 (repealed)	December 1540 c. 28; 1540 c. 92	10 December 1540
Generale remissioun grantit be the kingis grace to all his liegis. General remission granted by the king's grace to all his subjects. (Repealed by Statute Law Revision (Scotland) Act 1906 (6 Edw. 7. c. 38))

=== March ===
The 7th parliament of James V, held in Edinburgh from 14 March 1541.

Short title, or popular name	Citation	Royal assent
Long title
Church (No. 2) Act 1540 (repealed)	March 1540 c. 1 (Note: This is the citation in the Record Edition.) — (Note: This act is not listed in the Duodecimal Edition.)	14 March 1541
For honour of the haly sacramentis. For honour of the holy sacraments. (Repealed by Statute Law Revision (Scotland) Act 1906 (6 Edw. 7. c. 38))
Virgin Mary Act 1540 (repealed)	March 1540 c. 2 —	14 March 1541
For worschip to be had to the Virgin Mary. For worship to be had to the Virgin Mary. (Repealed by Statute Law Revision (Scotland) Act 1906 (6 Edw. 7. c. 38))
Pope Act 1540 (repealed)	March 1540 c. 3 —	14 March 1541
That na man argun the papis auctorite. That no man may question the pope's authority. (Repealed by Statute Law Revision (Scotland) Act 1906 (6 Edw. 7. c. 38))
Church (No. 3) Act 1540 (repealed)	March 1540 c. 4 —	14 March 1541
For reforming of kirkis and kirkmen. For reforming churches and clerics. (Repealed by Statute Law Revision (Scotland) Act 1906 (6 Edw. 7. c. 38))
Church (No. 4) Act 1540 (repealed)	March 1540 c. 5 —	14 March 1541
That na private conventionis be maid to desput on the scriptour. That no private conventions be made to dispute the scripture. (Repealed by Statute Law Revision (Scotland) Act 1906 (6 Edw. 7. c. 38))
Heresy Act 1540 (repealed)	March 1540 c. 6 —	14 March 1541
Of personis abjurit of heresy. Of persons abjured of heresy. (Repealed by Statute Law Revision (Scotland) Act 1906 (6 Edw. 7. c. 38))
Heresy (No. 2) Act 1540 (repealed)	March 1540 c. 7 —	14 March 1541
Of fugitivis suspect and summond for heresy. Of the fugitives suspected and summoned of heresy. (Repealed by Statute Law Revision (Scotland) Act 1906 (6 Edw. 7. c. 38))
Heresy (No. 3) Act 1540 (repealed)	March 1540 c. 8 —	14 March 1541
Reward of thame that revelis conventionis and accusis heretikis. Reward for those that reveal conventions and accuse heretics. (Repealed by Statute Law Revision (Scotland) Act 1906 (6 Edw. 7. c. 38))
Saints' Images Act 1540 (repealed)	March 1540 c. 9 —	14 March 1541
That nane dishonour imagis of sanctis. That none dishonour images of saints. (Repealed by Statute Law Revision (Scotland) Act 1906 (6 Edw. 7. c. 38))
College of Justice Act 1540 still in force or the Act of Sederunt 1540	March 1540 c. 10; 1540 c. 93 (Note: This is the citation in the Duodecimal Edition.)	14 March 1541
Ratificatioune of the Institutioune of the college of iustice. Ratification of the institution of the college of justice.
Defence of the Realm Act 1540 (repealed)	March 1540 c. 11; 1540 c. 94	14 March 1541
Hagbutis and uthir small artelyerie to be furnist within the realme. Hackbuts and other small artillery to be furnished within the realm. (Repealed by Statute Law Revision (Scotland) Act 1906 (6 Edw. 7. c. 38))
Defence of the Realm (No. 2) Act 1540 (repealed)	March 1540 c. 12; 1540 c. 95	14 March 1541
For hamebringing of hagbutis culveringis pulder and harnesses. For importation of hackbuts, culverins, powder and harnesses. (Repealed by Statute Law Revision (Scotland) Act 1906 (6 Edw. 7. c. 38))
Crown Rents Act 1540 (repealed)	March 1540 c. 13; 1540 c. 96	14 March 1541
For inbringing of the kingis grace propirtie and casualiteis. For collection of the king's grace's property and casualties. (Repealed by Statute Law Revision (Scotland) Act 1906 (6 Edw. 7. c. 38))
Murder Act 1540 (repealed)	March 1540 c. 14; 1540 c. 97	14 March 1541
Anentis committaris of slauchter mutilatioun and ressetting of the kingis rebellis. Regarding committers of slaughter, mutilation and harbouring of the king's rebels. (Repealed by Statute Law Revision (Scotland) Act 1906 (6 Edw. 7. c. 38))
Theft Act 1540 (repealed)	March 1540 c. 15 —	14 March 1541
For stanching of thift stouth and reiff. For staunching of theft, stealing and robbery. (Repealed by Statute Law Revision (Scotland) Act 1906 (6 Edw. 7. c. 38))
Food Supply Act 1540 (repealed)	March 1540 c. 16; 1540 c. 98	14 March 1541
For eschewing of derth of wittalis flesche and fische. For eschewing of dearth of victuals, meat and fish. (Repealed by Forestalling, Regrating, etc. Act 1844 (7 & 8 Vict. c. 24))
Coinage Act 1540 (repealed)	March 1540 c. 17; 1540 c. 99	14 March 1541
Tuiching the croun of wecht. Touching the crown of weight. (Repealed by Statute Law Revision (Scotland) Act 1906 (6 Edw. 7. c. 38))
Wine, Salt and Timber Act 1540 (repealed)	March 1540 c. 18; 1540 c. 100	14 March 1541
For stanching of derth and prices of wyne salt and tymmer. For staunching of dearth and prices of wine, salt and timber. (Repealed by Forestalling, Regrating, etc. Act 1844 (7 & 8 Vict. c. 24))
Hospitals Act 1540 (repealed)	March 1540 c. 19; 1540 c. 101	14 March 1541
Tuiching the hospitalis. Touching the hospitals. (Repealed by Statute Law Revision (Scotland) Act 1906 (6 Edw. 7. c. 38))
Not public and general	March 1540 c. 20; 1540 c. 102	14 March 1541
For policy of Edinburgh. For policy of Edinburgh.
Not public and general	March 1540 c. 21; 1540 c. 103	14 March 1541
Anent the mele merket in Edinburgh. Regarding the meal market of Edinburgh.
Judges Act 1540 (repealed)	March 1540 c. 22; 1540 c. 104	14 March 1541
The panis Imput to wrangous Jugis. The pains Imposed on wrongful Judges. (Repealed by Statute Law (Repeals) Act 1973 (c. 39))
Fraud Act 1540 (repealed)	March 1540 c. 23; 1540 c. 105	14 March 1541
Provisioun and panis of thame committand fraud in alienatioun or utherwyis. Provision and pains of those committing fraud in alienation or otherwise. (Repealed by Statute Law Revision (Scotland) Act 1964 (c. 80))
Entry to Lands Act 1540 (repealed)	March 1540 c. 24; 1540 c. 106	14 March 1541
Remeid aganis thame that lyis out and will not entir to thair landis in fraud of thare creditouris. Remedy against those that lie out and do not enter to their lands in fraud of the creditors. (Repealed by Statute Law Revision (Scotland) Act 1906 (6 Edw. 7. c. 38))
Burghs Act 1540 (repealed)	March 1540 c. 25 —	14 March 1541
Anentis privilege of burrowis. Regarding the privilege of burghs. (Repealed by Statute Law Revision (Scotland) Act 1906 (6 Edw. 7. c. 38))
Burghs (No. 2) Act 1540 (repealed)	March 1540 c. 26; 1540 c. 107	14 March 1541
Off pakking and peling. Of packing and peeling. (Repealed by Statute Law Revision (Scotland) Act 1906 (6 Edw. 7. c. 38))
Coin Act 1540 (repealed)	March 1540 c. 27; 1540 c. 108	14 March 1541
Anentis furth having of money of the realme. Regarding taking money out of the realm. (Repealed by Statute Law Revision (Scotland) Act 1906 (6 Edw. 7. c. 38))
Measures Act 1540 (repealed)	March 1540 c. 28; 1540 c. 109	14 March 1541
Off mesouris. Of measures. (Repealed by Statute Law Revision (Scotland) Act 1906 (6 Edw. 7. c. 38))
Expenses of Process Act 1540 (repealed)	March 1540 c. 29; 1540 c. 110	14 March 1541
Off the pane of thame that tynis the pley. The pain of those who lose lawsuits. (Repealed by Statute Law Revision (Scotland) Act 1906 (6 Edw. 7. c. 38))
Craftsmen Act 1540 (repealed)	March 1540 c. 30; 1540 c. 111	14 March 1541
Anentis conductioun of craftismen. Regarding the conduct of craftsmen. (Repealed by Statute Law Revision (Scotland) Act 1906 (6 Edw. 7. c. 38))
Clothmakers Act 1540 (repealed)	March 1540 c. 31; 1540 c. 112	14 March 1541
Anentis drawaris of claith. Regarding finishers of cloth. (Repealed by Statute Law Revision (Scotland) Act 1906 (6 Edw. 7. c. 38))
Forestallers Act 1540 (repealed)	March 1540 c. 32; 1540 c. 113	14 March 1541
Anentis forstallaris. Regarding forestallers. (Repealed by Forestalling, Regrating, etc. Act 1844 (7 & 8 Vict. c. 24))
Weights Act 1540 (repealed)	March 1540 c. 33; 1540 c. 114	14 March 1541
Anentis wechtis. Regarding weights. (Repealed by Statute Law Revision (Scotland) Act 1906 (6 Edw. 7. c. 38))
Not public and general	March 1540 c. 34; 1540 c. 115	14 March 1541
Annexatioun. Annexation.
Dissolution of Crown Lands Act 1540 (repealed)	March 1540 c. 35; 1540 c. 116	14 March 1541
Dissolucion of the unioun for setting of fewis. Dissolution of the union for setting of feus. (Repealed by Statute Law Revision (Scotland) Act 1906 (6 Edw. 7. c. 38))
Not public and general	March 1540 c. 36 —	14 March 1541
Grant to Thomas Erskin of Brechin knycht secretar of the lands of Brechin and Nevair. Grant to Thomas Erskine of Brechin, knight, secretary, of the lands of Brechin and Navar.
Subscription of Deeds Act 1540 (repealed)	March 1540 c. 37; 1540 c. 117	14 March 1541
That na faith be gevin to euidentis selit without subscripcioun be the principale or notare. That no faith be given to evidents sealed without subscription by the principal or notary. (Repealed by Requirements of Writing (Scotland) Act 1995 (c. 7))
Crime Act 1540 (repealed)	March 1540 c. 38; 1540 c. 118	14 March 1541
Anentis birning of cornis rasing of fyre and revesing of women. Regarding the burning of corn, raising of fire and ravishing of women. (Repealed by Statute Law Revision (Scotland) Act 1906 (6 Edw. 7. c. 38))
King's Privileges from Rome Act 1540 (repealed)	March 1540 c. 39; 1540 c. 119	14 March 1541
Anentis thame that brekis or passis contrar the kingis grace privilegis grantit to him be the sete of Rome. Regarding those that break or pass contrary to the king's grace's privileges, granted to him by the see of Rome. (Repealed by Statute Law Revision (Scotland) Act 1906 (6 Edw. 7. c. 38))
Intestate Succession Act 1540 (repealed)	March 1540 c. 40; 1540 c. 120	14 March 1541
The nerrest of the kyn to have the gudis of thaim that deis untestit without prejudice of the cote. The nearest of kin to have the goods of those who die intestate without prejudice of the quot. (Repealed by Statute Law Revision (Scotland) Act 1906 (6 Edw. 7. c. 38))
Legates Act 1540 (repealed)	March 1540 c. 41 —	14 March 1541
That na legat be ressavit in this realm. That no legate be received in this realm. (Repealed by Statute Law Revision (Scotland) Act 1964 (c. 80))
Not public and general	March 1540 c. 42; 1540 c. 121	14 March 1541
Thre mercat dais for selling of breid. Three market days for selling bread.
Not public and general	March 1540 c. 43; 1540 c. 122	14 March 1541
Thre mercat dais for selling of flesche. Three market days for selling of meat.
Tallow Act 1540 (repealed)	March 1540 c. 44; 1540 c. 123	14 March 1541
Off talloun. Of tallow. (Repealed by Statute Law Revision (Scotland) Act 1906 (6 Edw. 7. c. 38))
Coining Act 1540 (repealed)	March 1540 c. 45; 1540 c. 124	14 March 1541
Off thaim that counterfetis the kingis money. Of those that counterfeit the king's money. (Repealed by Statute Law Revision (Scotland) Act 1906 (6 Edw. 7. c. 38))
Bishoprics and Abbacies Act 1540 (repealed)	March 1540 c. 46; 1540 c. 125	14 March 1541
Anentis thame that takis placis of bischoppis or abbotis eftir thare deceis. Regarding those that take places of bishops or abbots after their death. (Repealed by Statute Law Revision (Scotland) Act 1906 (6 Edw. 7. c. 38))
Printing Acts of Parliament Act 1540 (repealed)	March 1540 c. 47; 1540 c. 127	14 March 1541
For prenting of the actis of Parliament. For printing of the acts of Parliament. (Repealed by Statute Law Revision (Scotland) Act 1906 (6 Edw. 7. c. 38))

=== Sources ===
- Alexander, William (1841). "Acta Parliamentorum Regis Jacobi Quinti". An Abridgement of the Acts of the Parliaments of Scotland. Edinburgh: Adam and Charles Black. pp. A16–A17 – via Google Books.
- Alexander, William (1841). "Acta Parliamentorum Regis Jacobi Quinti". An Abridgement of the Acts of the Parliaments of Scotland. Edinburgh: Adam and Charles Black. pp. A16–A17 – via Google Books.
- Chronological Table of the Statutes. London: Her Majesty's Stationery Office. 1972. pp. 1329–1331 – via Google Books.
- "Acts of the Old Scottish Parliament: 1540". legislation.gov.uk. The National Archives.
- "Index of Statutes: James V (1513-1542)". Records of the Parliaments of Scotland to 1707. University of St Andrews.

== See also ==
- List of legislation in the United Kingdom
- Records of the Parliaments of Scotland
