= List of acts of the Parliament of Scotland from 1592 =

This is a list of acts of the Parliament of Scotland for the year 1592.

It lists acts of Parliament of the old Parliament of Scotland, that was merged with the old Parliament of England to form the Parliament of Great Britain, by the Union with England Act 1707 (c. 7).

For other years, see list of acts of the Parliament of Scotland. For the period after 1707, see list of acts of the Parliament of Great Britain.

== 1592 ==
The 12th parliament of James VI, which met in Edinburgh from 3 April 1592.

Short title, or popular name	Citation	Royal assent
Long title
Not public and general	1592 c. 1 (Note: This is the citation in the Record Edition.) — (Note: This act is not listed in the Duodecimal Edition.)	5 June 1592
Ratificatioun of the proces of foirfaltour of Frances sumtyme erle Bothuell.
Not public and general	1592 c. 2 —	5 June 1592
The disheresing of the posteritie of personis foirfaltit in this present Parliament.
Not public and general	1592 c. 3 —	5 June 1592
Act in favour of the vassallis of thame that ar foirfaltit.
Obligations of Forfeited Persons Act 1592 (repealed)	1592 c. 4 — (Note: This is the citation in the Duodecimal Edition.)	5 June 1592
Act in favouris of the inhabitantis of Edinburgh that had contractus or obligationis of the personis foirfaltit. (Repealed by Statute Law Revision (Scotland) Act 1906 (6 Edw. 7. c. 38))
Not public and general	1592 c. 5 —	5 June 1592
Act in favouris of M^{r} Johnne Moncreif advocat.
Not public and general	1592 c. 6 —	5 June 1592
Act in favour of Rachaell Makgill.
Not public and general	1592 c. 7 —	5 June 1592
Act in favouris of the erle Merschell concerning the landis and guidis of maister Johnne Colvile.
General Assembly Act 1592 still in force or the Golden Act 1592	1592 c. 8; 1592 c. 116	5 June 1592
Act for abolisheing of the actis contrair the trew religioun.
Deposition of Ministers Act 1592 (repealed)	1592 c. 9; 1592 c. 117	5 June 1592
Anent depositioun of vnqualifiet personis frome thair functionis and Beneficis. (Repealed by Statute Law (Repeals) Act 1974 (c. 22))
Manses and Glebes Act 1592 (repealed)	1592 c. 10; 1592 c. 118	5 June 1592
Anent manssis and glebis in cathedrall abbay kirkis. (Repealed by Statute Law Revision (Scotland) Act 1964 (c. 80))
Adultery Act 1592 (repealed)	1592 c. 11; 1592 c. 119	5 June 1592
Aganis Adulteraris. (Repealed by Statute Law Revision (Scotland) Act 1964 (c. 80))
Murder in Churches Act 1592 (repealed)	1592 c. 12; 1592 c. 120	5 June 1592
For punishement of slauchter within kirkis or kirkyairdis. (Repealed by Statute Law Revision (Scotland) Act 1964 (c. 80))
Erection of Church Lands and Teinds Act 1592 (repealed)	1592 c. 13; 1592 c. 121	5 June 1592
Concerning the erectioun of kirklandis and teyndis in temporall lordschippis. (Repealed by Statute Law Revision (Scotland) Act 1964 (c. 80))
Jesuits Act 1592 (repealed)	1592 c. 14; 1592 c. 122	5 June 1592
Againis Jesuites seminary preistis and thair resettaris. (Repealed by Statute Law Revision (Scotland) Act 1964 (c. 80))
Ministers' Stipends Act 1592 (repealed)	1592 c. 15; 1592 c. 123	5 June 1592
Ratificatioun of the act maid in februar 1587 in favour of the ministrie thair stipendis and rentis. (Repealed by Statute Law Revision (Scotland) Act 1964 (c. 80))
Not public and general	1592 c. 16 —	5 June 1592
Exceptioun in favour of Adam bischop of Orknay.
Market-days Act 1592 (repealed)	1592 c. 17; 1592 c. 124	5 June 1592
Alteratioun of the mercat dayis frome the sabboth day. (Repealed by Statute Law Revision (Scotland) Act 1964 (c. 80))
Pacification Act 1592 (repealed)	1592 c. 18; 1592 c. 125	5 June 1592
Quha hes not gevin confessioun of thair faith sall not enjoy the benefite of pacificatioun. (Repealed by Statute Law Revision (Scotland) Act 1964 (c. 80))
Hospitals Act 1592 (repealed)	1592 c. 19 —	5 June 1592
Commissioun for reparatioun of hospitallis. (Repealed by Statute Law Revision (Scotland) Act 1964 (c. 80))
Not public and general	1592 c. 20 —	5 June 1592
For bigging of ane secund kirk within the parochin of Sanctandrois.
Not public and general	1592 c. 21 —	5 June 1592
For appreving of the kirk biggit be Johnne Schaw of Grenok.
Not public and general	1592 c. 22 —	5 June 1592
Act anent the unioun of the kirk of Forteviot to the auld college of Sanctandrois.
Not public and general	1592 c. 23 —	5 June 1592
Anent the dissolutioun of the deanry of Restalrig.
Not public and general	1592 c. 24 —	5 June 1592
Ratificatioun to Johnne Dury minister.
Not public and general	1592 c. 25 —	5 June 1592
Anent the dissolutioun of the kirkis of the bischoprik of Dumblane.
Not public and general	1592 c. 26 —	5 June 1592
Act anent the ministeris manse of Pettenweme.
Ministers' Stipends (No. 2) Act 1592 (repealed)	1592 c. 27 —	5 June 1592
Commissioun to confer and treat with the Ministre anent the provisioun of sufficient and locall stipendis to the ministeris. (Repealed by Statute Law Revision (Scotland) Act 1964 (c. 80))
Sheriff's Deputes Act 1592 (repealed)	1592 c. 28; 1592 c. 126	5 June 1592
Anent the dewtie of schireffis and utheris Jugeis ordinar thair depuittis and clerkis. (Repealed by Statute Law Revision (Scotland) Act 1964 (c. 80))
Lyon King of Arms Act 1592 still in force	1592 c. 29; 1592 c. 127	5 June 1592
Concerning the office of lyoun king of armes and his brether herauldis.
Crown-rents Act 1592 (repealed)	1592 c. 30; 1592 c. 128	5 June 1592
For furthering of the payment and in bringing of the kingis casualities. (Repealed by Statute Law Revision (Scotland) Act 1906 (6 Edw. 7. c. 38))
Mines and Metals Act 1592 still in force	1592 c. 31 —	5 June 1592
For furthering of the kingis commoditie be the Mynes and metallis.
King's Revocation Act 1592 (repealed)	1592 c. 32 —	5 June 1592
Ratificatioun of the kingis Majesties revocatioun. Ratification of the king's Majesty's revocation. (Repealed by Statute Law Revision (Scotland) Act 1906 (6 Edw. 7. c. 38))
Not public and general	1592 c. 33 —	5 June 1592
Exceptioun for the duke of Lennox.
Crown Lands Act 1592 (repealed)	1592 c. 34; 1592 c. 129	5 June 1592
Anent confirmatioun of the kingis propre landis past without advise of his Comptrollair. (Repealed by Statute Law Revision (Scotland) Act 1906 (6 Edw. 7. c. 38))
King's Parks Act 1592 (repealed)	1592 c. 35; 1592 c. 130	5 June 1592
For the better keiping of the kingis Parkis. (Repealed by Statute Law Revision (Scotland) Act 1906 (6 Edw. 7. c. 38))
Burgh Maills Act 1592 (repealed)	1592 c. 36 —	5 June 1592
Anent the payment of the burrow males. (Repealed by Statute Law Revision (Scotland) Act 1906 (6 Edw. 7. c. 38))
Customs Act 1592 (repealed)	1592 c. 37; 1592 c. 131	5 June 1592
Anent the custumes of Englische guidis. (Repealed by Statute Law Revision (Scotland) Act 1906 (6 Edw. 7. c. 38))
Salvo Jure Cujuslibet Act 1592 (repealed)	1592 c. 38; 1592 c. 132	5 June 1592
That the ratificationis past in this present parliament sall not prejuge parties richtis. (Repealed by Statute Law Revision (Scotland) Act 1906 (6 Edw. 7. c. 38))
Not public and general	1592 c. 39 —	5 June 1592
Annexatioun of Kelso and Coldinghame to the croun.
Not public and general	1592 c. 40 —	5 June 1592
Anent the inobedience of personis possessouris of the kingis propre landis of the hielandis and ilis.
Privy Council Act 1592 (repealed)	1592 c. 41 —	5 June 1592
The nominatioun and establisching of oure soverane lordis privie counsaill. (Repealed by Statute Law Revision (Scotland) Act 1906 (6 Edw. 7. c. 38))
Treasurer Act 1592 (repealed)	1592 c. 42 —	5 June 1592
Concerning the thesaurair anent ratificationis and uther materis past in this present parliament. (Repealed by Statute Law Revision (Scotland) Act 1906 (6 Edw. 7. c. 38))
Not public and general	1592 c. 43 —	5 June 1592
Concerning the kingis chapell royall of Striviling and his hienes musicianis.
Rentals and Feus Act 1592 (repealed)	1592 c. 44; 1592 c. 133	5 June 1592
Anent the productioun of rentallis and fewis. (Repealed by Statute Law Revision (Scotland) Act 1906 (6 Edw. 7. c. 38))
Printing Acts of Parliament Act 1592 (repealed)	1592 c. 45 —	5 June 1592
For visitting and caussing of the lawes and actis of parliament to be prentit. (Repealed by Statute Law Revision (Scotland) Act 1906 (6 Edw. 7. c. 38))
King's Marriage Act 1592 (repealed)	1592 c. 46 —	5 June 1592
Ratificatioun of the contract of mariage betuix the King and Quenis majesties and of hir hienes infeftmentis and titles past thairupoun. (Repealed by Statute Law Revision (Scotland) Act 1906 (6 Edw. 7. c. 38))
King's Marriage (No. 2) Act 1592 (repealed)	1592 c. 47 —	5 June 1592
Approbatioun of thair services quha accumpaniet his Majestie to Noroway and Denmark. (Repealed by Statute Law Revision (Scotland) Act 1906 (6 Edw. 7. c. 38))
King's Marriage (No. 3) Act 1592 (repealed)	1592 c. 48 —	5 June 1592
Ratificatioun of the crll of Merschellis proceding in Denmark direct to treat the mariage betuix the King and Quenis majesties and of his infeftmentis. (Repealed by Statute Law Revision (Scotland) Act 1906 (6 Edw. 7. c. 38))
King's Marriage (No. 4) Act 1592 (repealed)	1592 c. 49 —	5 June 1592
Ratificatioun to the laird of Barnebarrauche and Maister Piter Young and of thair procedingis in the said mariage and of thair infeftmentis. (Repealed by Statute Law Revision (Scotland) Act 1906 (6 Edw. 7. c. 38))
Lords of Session Act 1592 (repealed)	1592 c. 50; 1592 c. 134	5 June 1592
Anent the aige and qualities of the lordis of Sessioun. (Repealed by Statute Law Revision (Scotland) Act 1964 (c. 80))
Signatures Act 1592 (repealed)	1592 c. 51; 1592 c. 135	5 June 1592
Tuiching the autenticke daiting and registring of signatures. (Repealed by Statute Law Revision (Scotland) Act 1964 (c. 80))
Reduction of Redemptions Act 1592 (repealed)	1592 c. 52; 1592 c. 136	5 June 1592
For eschewing of faulsettis in reductioun of decreittis of redemptioun. (Repealed by Statute Law Revision (Scotland) Act 1964 (c. 80))
Redemptions Act 1592 (repealed)	1592 c. 53; 1592 c. 137	5 June 1592
Act in favour of redemptioun of landis be quhatsumeuir personis. (Repealed by Statute Law Revision (Scotland) Act 1964 (c. 80))
Bounding Charters Act 1592 (repealed)	1592 c. 54; 1592 c. 138	5 June 1592
Anent the validitie of new boundand evidentis. (Repealed by Statute Law Revision (Scotland) Act 1964 (c. 80))
Pensions Act 1592 (repealed)	1592 c. 55; 1592 c. 139	5 June 1592
Concerning pensionis nocht authorizit be decreit or possessioun. (Repealed by Statute Law Revision (Scotland) Act 1964 (c. 80))
Unlawful Conditions in Contracts Act 1592 (repealed)	1592 c. 56; 1592 c. 140	5 June 1592
Aganis unlawfull condicionis in contractis or obligationis. (Repealed by Statute Law Revision (Scotland) Act 1906 (6 Edw. 7. c. 38))
Repossessions Act 1592 (repealed)	1592 c. 57 —	5 June 1592
Prescriptioun of the act of repossessing. (Repealed by Statute Law Revision (Scotland) Act 1906 (6 Edw. 7. c. 38))
Bonds by Prisoners Act 1592 (repealed)	1592 c. 58 —	5 June 1592
Act annulling the bandis and contractis of personis being in captivitie. (Repealed by Statute Law Revision (Scotland) Act 1906 (6 Edw. 7. c. 38))
Citation Act 1592 still in force	1592 c. 59; 1592 c. 141	5 June 1592
That the Copies of lettres or chargis be subscryvit be the executor thairof.
General Charges Act 1592 (repealed)	1592 c. 60; 1592 c. 142	5 June 1592
Anent denunceatioun of personis to the horne upoun lettres chargeing all and sindrie generallie. (Repealed by Statute Law Revision (Scotland) Act 1906 (6 Edw. 7. c. 38))
Compensation Act 1592 still in force	1592 c. 61; 1592 c. 143	5 June 1592
That Compensatioun de liquido ad liquidum be admittit in all Jugementis.
Expenses Act 1592 still in force	1592 c. 62; 1592 c. 144	5 June 1592
Anent damnage and expenses of pley.
Escheats Act 1592 (repealed)	1592 c. 63; 1592 c. 145	5 June 1592
That the obtenaris of giftis of escheatis pay the debt contenit in the horning quhairupoun the gift procedit. (Repealed by Statute Law Revision (Scotland) Act 1906 (6 Edw. 7. c. 38))
Commissariot Act 1592 (repealed)	1592 c. 64 —	5 June 1592
Ratificatioun of the Commissariat of Edinburgh. (Repealed by Statute Law Revision (Scotland) Act 1906 (6 Edw. 7. c. 38))
Treason Act 1592 (repealed)	1592 c. 65; 1592 c. 146	5 June 1592
For puneisment of the ressettaris of tratouris and rebellis. (Repealed by Statute Law Revision (Scotland) Act 1906 (6 Edw. 7. c. 38))
Escheats (No. 2) Act 1592 (repealed)	1592 c. 66; 1592 c. 147	5 June 1592
Anent the eschaetis of rebellis. (Repealed by Statute Law Revision (Scotland) Act 1906 (6 Edw. 7. c. 38))
Remissions Act 1592 (repealed)	1592 c. 67; 1592 c. 157	5 June 1592
Aganis granting of respeittis and remissionis. (Repealed by Statute Law Revision (Scotland) Act 1906 (6 Edw. 7. c. 38))
Fire Raising in Coal Mines Act 1592 (repealed)	1592 c. 68; 1592 c. 148	5 June 1592
For puneisment of the wilfull setting of fyre in coilheuchis. (Repealed by Statute Law Revision (Scotland) Act 1906 (6 Edw. 7. c. 38))
Beggars and Poor Act 1592 (repealed)	1592 c. 69; 1592 c. 149	5 June 1592
For puneisment of masterfull beggaris and releif of the puir. (Repealed by Statute Law Revision (Scotland) Act 1906 (6 Edw. 7. c. 38))
Forestallers Act 1592 (repealed)	1592 c. 70; 1592 c. 150	5 June 1592
Aganis foirstalleris and regraittaris. (Repealed by Forestalling, Regrating, etc. Act 1844 (7 & 8 Vict. c. 24))
Export of Bestial Act 1592 (repealed)	1592 c. 71; 1592 c. 151	5 June 1592
Aganis caryaris of nolt and scheip furth of the realme. (Repealed by Statute Law Revision (Scotland) Act 1906 (6 Edw. 7. c. 38))
Deforcement Act 1592 still in force	1592 c. 72; 1592 c. 152	5 June 1592
Anent deforceing and trubling of the kingis officiaris of armes.
Criminal Libel Act 1592 (repealed)	1592 c. 73; 1592 c. 153	5 June 1592
Concerning the relevancie of lybellis in caussis criminall. (Repealed by Statute Law Revision (Scotland) Act 1906 (6 Edw. 7. c. 38))
Burghs Act 1592 (repealed)	1592 c. 74; 1592 c. 154	5 June 1592
Anent the liberties of frie burrowis. (Repealed by Statute Law Revision (Scotland) Act 1906 (6 Edw. 7. c. 38))
Burghs (No. 2) Act 1592 (repealed)	1592 c. 75; 1592 c. 155	5 June 1592
Anent the taxatioun of burrowis. (Repealed by Statute Law Revision (Scotland) Act 1964 (c. 80))
Craftsmen in Suburbs Act 1592 (repealed)	1592 c. 76; 1592 c. 156	5 June 1592
Aganis sic as exercesis craftis in suburbis adjacent to burrowis. (Repealed by Statute Law Revision (Scotland) Act 1906 (6 Edw. 7. c. 38))
Export of Hides Act 1592 (repealed)	1592 c. 77; 1592 c. 158	5 June 1592
Aganis transporting of weill and kid skynnis furth of the realme. (Repealed by Statute Law Revision (Scotland) Act 1906 (6 Edw. 7. c. 38))
Streets in Burgh Act 1592 (repealed)	1592 c. 78; 1592 c. 159	5 June 1592
Concerning the streitis and passages off burrowis. (Repealed by Statute Law Revision (Scotland) Act 1906 (6 Edw. 7. c. 38))
Admiral Act 1592 (repealed)	1592 c. 79; 1592 c. 160	5 June 1592
Concerning certane abuses in the Admirallis procedingis. (Repealed by Statute Law Revision (Scotland) Act 1906 (6 Edw. 7. c. 38))
Not public and general	1592 c. 80 —	5 June 1592
Ratificatioun of the burgh of Hadingtoun.
Not public and general	1592 c. 81 —	5 June 1592
Ratificatioun of the hospitall of Perth.
Not public and general	1592 c. 82; 1592 c. 162	5 June 1592
Ratificatioun of the landis and annuellis mortifiet to the ministrie and hospitall of Edinburgh.
Not public and general	1592 c. 83 —	5 June 1592
Act for bigging the tolbuith of Clakmannane.
Not public and general	1592 c. 84 —	5 June 1592
Act for erecting of the toun of Scraling in burgh of baronie.
Not public and general	1592 c. 85 —	5 June 1592
Act for changeing of the fair of Dornoche.
Not public and general	1592 c. 86 —	5 June 1592
Act in favour of the burgh of Anstruther be wast the burne.
Not public and general	1592 c. 87 —	5 June 1592
Act in favour of the burgh of Culros.
Remit to Privy Council Act 1592 (repealed)	1592 c. 88 —	5 June 1592
Act remittand certane articlis and supplicationis to the Privie Counsaill. (Repealed by Statute Law Revision (Scotland) Act 1906 (6 Edw. 7. c. 38))
Provostries Act 1592 (repealed)	1592 c. 89; 1592 c. 161	5 June 1592
Anent provestries and prebendaries being laic patronages. (Repealed by Statute Law Revision (Scotland) Act 1906 (6 Edw. 7. c. 38))
Not public and general	1592 c. 90 —	5 June 1592
Ratificatioun of the exceptionis frome the generall act of Annexatioun.
Not public and general	1592 c. 91 —	5 June 1592
Declaratioun to the erll of Angus anent his honouris.
Not public and general	1592 c. 92 —	5 June 1592
Ratificatioun of ane contract betuix the King and the erll of Angus.
Not public and general	1592 c. 93 —	5 June 1592
Ratificatioun to the duke of Lennox anent the superioritie of the priorie of Sanctandrois.
Not public and general	1592 c. 94 —	5 June 1592
Ratificatioun to the erll of Orknay.
Not public and general	1592 c. 95 —	5 June 1592
Ratificatioun to the erll of Gowrie of his infeftment.
Not public and general	1592 c. 96 —	5 June 1592
Ratificatioun to the erll of Gowrie of the abbacie of Scone.
Not public and general	1592 c. 97 —	5 June 1592
Ratificatioun to the erll of Montrois.
Not public and general	1592 c. 98 —	5 June 1592
Ratificatioun to the maister of Montrois.
Not public and general	1592 c. 99 —	5 June 1592
Ratificatioun to the lord Lindsay.
Not public and general	1592 c. 100 —	5 June 1592
Ratificatioun of ane pensioun out of Quhithorne to the lord of Spynie.
Not public and general	1592 c. 101 —	5 June 1592
Ratificatioun to the maister of Drummond.
Not public and general	1592 c. 102 —	5 June 1592
Act anent the temporalitie of Paislay.
Not public and general	1592 c. 103 —	5 June 1592
Act in favour of the comendatar of Melros anent certane few landis thairof.
Not public and general	1592 c. 104 —	5 June 1592
Ratificatioun to Archibald Douglas sone to the commendatar of Melros.
Not public and general	1592 c. 105 —	5 June 1592
Ratificatioun to the comendatar of Kinlos.
Not public and general	1592 c. 106 —	5 June 1592
Ratificatioun to the commendatar of Lundoris.
Not public and general	1592 c. 107 —	5 June 1592
Ratificatioun to the lord of Newbotle.
Not public and general	1592 c. 108 —	5 June 1592
Ratificatioun to the lord of Urquhart.
Not public and general	1592 c. 109 —	5 June 1592
Act in favour of Johnne Coluile sone to the commendatar of Culros.
Not public and general	1592 c. 110 —	5 June 1592
Act in favour of Williame commendatar of Toungland anent the temporalitie of Kilwynning.
Not public and general	1592 c. 111 —	5 June 1592
Ratificatioun in favour of the barnis of umquhill Sir Lues Bellenden of Auchnoule lait justice clerk.
Not public and general	1592 c. 112 —	5 June 1592
Ratificatioun in favour of the barnis of the umquhill laird of Segy.
Not public and general	1592 c. 113 —	5 June 1592
Ratificatioun to maister David Chalmer of Ormound.
Not public and general	1592 c. 114 —	5 June 1592
Ratificatioun to Alexander Hwme of Northberwik.
Not public and general	1592 c. 115 —	5 June 1592
Ratificatioun to Sir Robert Melvill of Murdocarny knicht thesaurair.
Not public and general	1592 c. 116 —	5 June 1592
Ratificatioun to Andro Melvill of Garvok maister houshald.
Not public and general	1592 c. 117 —	5 June 1592
Ratificatioun to the laird of Tullibardin maister of the houshald.
Not public and general	1592 c. 118 —	5 June 1592
Ratificatioun to the laird of Ormeistoun justice clerk.
Not public and general	1592 c. 119 —	5 June 1592
Act in favour of Sir Johnne Carmichaell of that Ilk knicht maister of stable.
Not public and general	1592 c. 120 —	5 June 1592
Ane act in favour of the said Sir Johnne Carmichaell concerning the landis of Langhirdmestoun.
Not public and general	1592 c. 121 —	5 June 1592
Ratificatioun to maister Gilbert Moncreif mediciner to his majestie.
Not public and general	1592 c. 122 —	5 June 1592
Ratificatioun to the young laird of Polwart and Patrik Murray.
Not public and general	1592 c. 123 —	5 June 1592
Ratificatioun to Thomas Erskin of Gogar and his brether.
Not public and general	1592 c. 124 —	5 June 1592
Ratificatioun to Thomas and Barny Lindsayis.
Not public and general	1592 c. 125 —	5 June 1592
Ratificatioun to maister George Young archedeane of Sanctandrois.
Not public and general	1592 c. 126 —	5 June 1592
Ratificatioun to Alexander Young yschear.
Not public and general	1592 c. 127 —	5 June 1592
Ratificatioun to Sir George Hwme of Prymroknowis knicht.
Not public and general	1592 c. 128 —	5 June 1592
Ratificatioun to Johne Gib wallet of his Majesties chalmer.
Not public and general	1592 c. 129 —	5 June 1592
Ratificatioun to Johnne Cheisholme comptroller of the ordinance.
Not public and general	1592 c. 130 —	5 June 1592
Ratificatioun to William Betoun.
Not public and general	1592 c. 131 —	5 June 1592
Ratificatioun to maister Henrie Keir.
Not public and general	1592 c. 132 —	5 June 1592
Act in favouris of the airis of Ewphame Mackalyeane contenand ane exceptioun for the landis of Cliftonhall and ane uther exceptioun to maister Johnne Nicolsone advocat.
Not public and general	1592 c. 133 —	5 June 1592
Act in favour of David Cwninghame of Robertland.
Not public and general	1592 c. 134 —	5 June 1592
Act in favour of the lady Aikett.
Not public and general	1592 c. 135 —	5 June 1592
Ratificatioun to the laird of Cesfurde.
Not public and general	1592 c. 136 —	5 June 1592
Act in favouris of the laird of Pittarrow.
Not public and general	1592 c. 137 —	5 June 1592
Ratificatioun to the laird of Findletter.
Not public and general	1592 c. 138 —	5 June 1592
Ratificatioun to the laird of Boquhollie.
Not public and general	1592 c. 139 —	5 June 1592
Ratificatioun to the laird of Largo.
Not public and general	1592 c. 140 —	5 June 1592
Ratificatioun of ane act of secreit counsaill in favouris of the laird of Bas.
Not public and general	1592 c. 141 —	5 June 1592
Ratificatioun to the laird of Ury.
Not public and general	1592 c. 142 —	5 June 1592
Ratificatioun to the laird of Phillorth.
Not public and general	1592 c. 143 —	5 June 1592
Ratificatioun to the laird of Essilmonthe.
Not public and general	1592 c. 144 —	5 June 1592
Ratificatioun to James Boyid of Kippis.
Not public and general	1592 c. 145 —	5 June 1592
Ratificatioun to Gavin Hamiltoun of Roploche.
Not public and general	1592 c. 146 —	5 June 1592
Ratificatioun to Nicoll Carnecors of Calfhill.
Not public and general	1592 c. 147 —	5 June 1592
Ratificatioun to James and Johnne Murrayis.
Not public and general	1592 c. 148 —	5 June 1592
Ratificatioun to Walter Scott of Tuschelaw.
Not public and general	1592 c. 149 —	5 June 1592
Ratificatioun to Frances Borthuik in Ballincreif.
Not public and general	1592 c. 150 —	5 June 1592
Ratificatioun to Sir Alexander Hwme of Snwk knicht.
Not public and general	1592 c. 151 —	5 June 1592
Ratificatioun to Johnne Hwme of Slegden.
Not public and general	1592 c. 152 —	5 June 1592
Ratificatioun to Thomas Menyies off Durne.
Not public and general	1592 c. 153 —	5 June 1592
Ratificatioun to George Hammiltoun in Prestoun.
Not public and general	1592 c. 154 —	5 June 1592
Ratificatioun to James Hammiltoun in Libbertoun.
Not public and general	1592 c. 155 —	5 June 1592
Ratificatioun to Williame Hwme off Bassindene.
Not public and general	1592 c. 156 —	5 June 1592
Ratificatioun to Johnne Schaw of Broiche.
Not public and general	1592 c. 157 —	5 June 1592
Ratificatioun of ane band of manrent to the laird of Blaikwode.
Not public and general	1592 c. 158 —	5 June 1592
Ratificatioun to Thomas Maitland.
Not public and general	1592 c. 159 —	5 June 1592
Ratificatioun to James Maitland.
Not public and general	1592 c. 160 —	5 June 1592
Ratificatioun to Johnne Andro clerk of the Secreit Counsaill.
Not public and general	1592 c. 161 —	5 June 1592
Ratificatioun to Williame Wylie writtar.
Not public and general	1592 c. 162 —	5 June 1592
Ratificatioun to Robert Stewart.
Not public and general	1592 c. 163 —	5 June 1592
Ratificatioun to maister George Tod.
Not public and general	1592 c. 164 —	5 June 1592
Ratificatioun to the clerk of register and maister Johnne Hay his sone.
Not public and general	1592 c. 165 —	5 June 1592
Ratificatioun of ane pensioun to Walter Henrysone.
Not public and general	1592 c. 166 —	5 June 1592
Ratificatioun to the erll of Murray of his supersedere.
Not public and general	1592 c. 167 —	5 June 1592
Ratificatioun to my lord of Thirlestane chancellar.
Not public and general	1592 c. 168 —	5 June 1592
Ratificatioun to the erll of Murray of his infeftmentis.
Not public and general	1592 c. 169 —	5 June 1592
Ratificatioun to the lord Dingwall.
Not public and general	1592 c. 170 —	5 June 1592
Ratificatioun to the laird of Ley younger.
Not public and general	1592 c. 171 —	5 June 1592
Ratificatioun to the said laird of Ley younger.
Not public and general	1592 c. 172 —	5 June 1592
Ratificatioun to the lord Seytoun.
Not public and general	1592 c. 173 —	5 June 1592
Ratificatioun to Johnne Levingstoun of Abircorne.
Not public and general	1592 c. 174 —	5 June 1592
Act in favour of the commendatar of Pettinweyme.
Not public and general	1592 c. 175 —	5 June 1592
Ratificatioun to the lord Boyid of his infeftmentis.
Not public and general	1592 c. 176 —	5 June 1592
Ratificatioun to the erll of Mortoun.
Not public and general	1592 c. 177 —	5 June 1592
Ratificatioun to the lord Yester.
Not public and general	1592 c. 178 —	5 June 1592
Ratificatioun to the laird of Donypace.
Not public and general	1592 c. 179 —	5 June 1592
Ratificatioun to George Sincler of May.
Not public and general	1592 c. 180 —	5 June 1592
Ratificatioun to Martine Elliott.
Not public and general	1592 c. 181 —	5 June 1592
Act ratifiand my Lord of Spyneis infeftment of the lordschip of Spyne and ordaning ane new infeftment thairof to be maid and als dissolveand the same frome the croun to that effect.

=== Sources ===
- Alexander, William (1841). "Acta Parliamentorum Regis Jacobi Sexti". An Abridgement of the Acts of the Parliaments of Scotland. Edinburgh: Adam and Charles Black. pp. A31 – A34 – via Google Books.
- Alexander, William (1841). "Acta Parliamentorum Regis Jacobi Sexti". An Abridgement of the Acts of the Parliaments of Scotland. Edinburgh: Adam and Charles Black. pp. A31 – A34 – via Google Books.
- Chronological Table of the Statutes. London: Her Majesty's Stationery Office. 1972. pp. 1341–1342 – via Google Books.
- "Acts of the Old Scottish Parliament: 1592". legislation.gov.uk. The National Archives.
- "Index of Statutes: James VI (1567-1625)". Records of the Parliaments of Scotland to 1707. University of St Andrews.

== See also ==
- List of legislation in the United Kingdom
- Records of the Parliaments of Scotland
