= List of acts of the Parliament of Scotland from 1503 =

This is a list of acts of the Parliament of Scotland for the year 1503.

It lists acts of Parliament of the old Parliament of Scotland, that was merged with the old Parliament of England to form the Parliament of Great Britain, by the Union with England Act 1707 (c. 7).

For other years, see list of acts of the Parliament of Scotland. For the period after 1707, see list of acts of the Parliament of Great Britain.

== 1503 ==
The 6th parliament of James IV, held in Edinburgh from 11 March 1504 until 19 March 1504.

| Short title, or popular name | Citation | Royal assent |
Long title
| Revocation Act 1503 (repealed) | Vol. II, p. 240 (Note: This is the citation in the Record Edition.); 1503 c. 100 (Note: This is the citation in the Duodecimal Edition.) | 19 March 1504 |
(Repealed by Statute Law Revision (Scotland) Act 1906 (6 Edw. 7. c. 38))
| Church Act 1503 (repealed) | 1503 c. 1 — (Note: This act is not listed in the Duodecimal Edition.) | 19 March 1504 |
Of the fredome of halykirk. Of the freedom of the holy church. (Repealed by Statute Law Revision (Scotland) Act 1906 (6 Edw. 7. c. 38))
| King's Council Act 1503 (repealed) | 1503 c. 2; 1503 c. 58 | 19 March 1504 |
Of ane consale to be chosin be the king quhilk sall sitt continually. Of one council to be chosen by the king which shall sit continuously. (Repealed by Statute Law Revision (Scotland) Act 1906 (6 Edw. 7. c. 38))
| Administration of Justice Act 1503 (repealed) | 1503 c. 3; 1503 c. 59 | 19 March 1504 |
Of Justices and schireffis depute for the Ilis. Of Justices and sheriffs depute for the Isles. (Repealed by Statute Law Revision (Scotland) Act 1906 (6 Edw. 7. c. 38))
| Administration of Justice (No. 2) Act 1503 (repealed) | 1503 c. 4; 1503 c. 60 | 19 March 1504 |
Of the Justice airis for Ergile and uthir pairtis. Of the Justice ayres for Argyll and other parts. (Repealed by Statute Law Revision (Scotland) Act 1906 (6 Edw. 7. c. 38))
| Administration of Justice (No. 3) Act 1503 (repealed) | 1503 c. 5; 1503 c. 61 | 19 March 1504 |
Of the Justice airis for the schirefdomis of Ros and Cathnes. Of the Justice ayres for the sheriffdoms of Ross and Caithness. (Repealed by Statute Law Revision (Scotland) Act 1906 (6 Edw. 7. c. 38))
| Remissions Act 1503 (repealed) | 1503 c. 6; 1503 c. 62 | 19 March 1504 |
Of remissionis. Of remissions. (Repealed by Statute Law Revision (Scotland) Act 1906 (6 Edw. 7. c. 38))
| Remissions for Murder Act 1503 (repealed) | 1503 c. 7; 1503 c. 63 | 19 March 1504 |
Aganis remissionis for slauchter upon forthocht fellony. Against remissions for murder committed as premeditated felony. (Repealed by Statute Law Revision (Scotland) Act 1906 (6 Edw. 7. c. 38))
| Notaries Act 1503 (repealed) | 1503 c. 8; 1503 c. 64 | 19 March 1504 |
Of fals notaris. Of dishonest notaries. (Repealed by Statute Law Revision (Scotland) Act 1906 (6 Edw. 7. c. 38))
| Spuilzie Act 1503 (repealed) | 1503 c. 9; 1503 c. 65 | 19 March 1504 |
Anent recent spulye. Regarding recent spulzie. (Repealed by Statute Law (Repeals) Act 1973 (c. 39))
| Sheriff's Expenses Act 1503 (repealed) | 1503 c. 10; 1503 c. 66 | 19 March 1504 |
Anent the expensis of schireffis for the executioun of thair office in the distrenyeing of personis for dettis. Regarding the expenses of sheriffs for the execution of their office in distraining of persons for debts. (Repealed by Statute Law Revision (Scotland) Act 1906 (6 Edw. 7. c. 38))
| Sheriff Court Expenses Act 1503 (repealed) | 1503 c. 11; 1503 c. 67 | 19 March 1504 |
Of the expensis of proces led befoir schireffis and uthir officiaris. Of the expense of process led before sheriffs and other officials. (Repealed by Statute Law Revision (Scotland) Act 1906 (6 Edw. 7. c. 38))
| Money Act 1503 (repealed) | 1503 c. 12; 1503 c. 68 | 19 March 1504 |
For the halding of money within the realme. For retaining money within the realm. (Repealed by Statute Law Revision (Scotland) Act 1906 (6 Edw. 7. c. 38))
| Fish Ponds Act 1503 (repealed) | 1503 c. 13; 1503 c. 69 | 19 March 1504 |
Anent stelaris of pikis out of stankis breikaris of dowcatis &c. Regarding stealing of pike from ponds, breaking dovecotes, etc. (Repealed by Statute Law Revision (Scotland) Act 1906 (6 Edw. 7. c. 38))
| Beggars Act 1503 (repealed) | 1503 c. 14; 1503 c. 70 | 19 March 1504 |
Anent beggaris. Regarding beggars. (Repealed by Statute Law Revision (Scotland) Act 1906 (6 Edw. 7. c. 38))
| Sea Fishing Act 1503 (repealed) | 1503 c. 15 — | 19 March 1504 |
Anent buschis and schippis to be maid for fisching. Regarding busses and ships to be made for fishing. (Repealed by Statute Law Revision (Scotland) Act 1906 (6 Edw. 7. c. 38))
| Green Wood Act 1503 (repealed) | 1503 c. 16; 1503 c. 71 | 19 March 1504 |
Anent the unlaw of gren wod—and the unlaw of murburn. Regarding the penalty of green wood; and the law of muir-burning. (Repealed by Statute Law Revision (Scotland) Act 1906 (6 Edw. 7. c. 38))
| Salmon Act 1503 (repealed) | 1503 c. 17; 1503 c. 72 | 19 March 1504 |
Anent the slauchter of red fische in for bodin tyme. Regarding the slaughter of red fish during the forbidden time. (Repealed by Statute Law Revision (Scotland) Act 1906 (6 Edw. 7. c. 38))
| Sheriffdoms Act 1503 (repealed) | 1503 c. 18; 1503 c. 73 | 19 March 1504 |
Anent the divisioun of schirefdomes. Regarding the division of sheriffdoms. (Repealed by Statute Law Revision (Scotland) Act 1906 (6 Edw. 7. c. 38))
| Dovecots Act 1503 (repealed) | 1503 c. 19; 1503 c. 74 | 19 March 1504 |
Anent policy to be haldin in the cuntre. The policy to be held in the countryside. (Repealed by Statute Law Revision (Scotland) Act 1906 (6 Edw. 7. c. 38))
| Wapinschaws Act 1503 (repealed) | 1503 c. 20; 1503 c. 75 | 19 March 1504 |
Of wappinschawis. Of wapinschaws. (Repealed by Statute Law Revision (Scotland) Act 1906 (6 Edw. 7. c. 38))
| Heirs and Executors Act 1503 (repealed) | 1503 c. 21; 1503 c. 76 | 19 March 1504 |
Of airis and executouris persewit for dettis of thair faderis or forbearis. Of heirs and executors pursued for debts of their fathers or forebears. (Repealed by Statute Law Revision (Scotland) Act 1964 (c. 80))
| Terce Act 1503 (repealed) | 1503 c. 22; 1503 c. 75 | 19 March 1504 |
Anent the exceptioun aganis wedowis persewand thair brevis of terce that thai war not lauchfull wiffis. Regarding the exception against widows pursuing their brieves of terce that they were not lawful wives. (Repealed by Succession (Scotland) Act 1964 (c. 41))
| Attendance in Parliament Act 1503 (repealed) | 1503 c. 23; 1503 c. 78 | 19 March 1504 |
Of presens in the Parliament. Of presence in the Parliament. (Repealed by Statute Law Revision (Scotland) Act 1906 (6 Edw. 7. c. 38))
| Law of the Land Act 1503 (repealed) | 1503 c. 24; 1503 c. 79 | 19 March 1504 |
That all the liegis be reulit be the lawis of the realme. That all subjects be ruled by the laws of the realm. (Repealed by Statute Law Revision (Scotland) Act 1906 (6 Edw. 7. c. 38))
| Burgh Officers Jurisdiction Act 1503 (repealed) | 1503 c. 25; 1503 c. 80 | 19 March 1504 |
Of all officiaris haifand office of Jurisdictioun within burgh. Of all officials having office of Jurisdiction within burghs. (Repealed by Statute Law Revision (Scotland) Act 1906 (6 Edw. 7. c. 38))
| Jurisdiction in Foreign Countries Act 1503 (repealed) | 1503 c. 26; 1503 c. 81 | 19 March 1504 |
Of Jurisdictioun amang merchandis in partis beyond sey. Of Jurisdiction amongst merchants in parts beyond the sea. (Repealed by Statute Law Revision (Scotland) Act 1906 (6 Edw. 7. c. 38))
| Conservator Act 1503 (repealed) | 1503 c. 27; 1503 c. 82 | 19 March 1504 |
Of the conservatour of Scotland. Of the conservator of Scotland. (Repealed by Statute Law Revision (Scotland) Act 1906 (6 Edw. 7. c. 38))
| Fairs Act 1503 (repealed) | 1503 c. 28; 1503 c. 83 | 19 March 1504 |
Anent faris haldin apon halidais or within kirkis or kirk yardis. Regarding fairs held on holy days or within churches or churchyards. (Repealed by Statute Law Revision (Scotland) Act 1906 (6 Edw. 7. c. 38))
| Burgh Privileges Act 1503 (repealed) | 1503 c. 29; 1503 c. 84 | 19 March 1504 |
Anent the privilegis and fredomes of merchandis and burrowis. Regarding the privileges and freedoms of merchants and burghs. (Repealed by Statute Law Revision (Scotland) Act 1906 (6 Edw. 7. c. 38))
| Burgh Taxes Act 1503 (repealed) | 1503 c. 30; 1503 c. 85 | 19 March 1504 |
That the commissaris of burrowis be warnyt quhen taxtis ar gevin. That the commissioners of burghs be warned when taxes are given. (Repealed by Statute Law Revision (Scotland) Act 1906 (6 Edw. 7. c. 38))
| Guild Brethren Act 1503 (repealed) | 1503 c. 31; 1503 c. 86 | 19 March 1504 |
Of the making of burgessis or gilde brethir. Of the making of burgesses or guild brothers. (Repealed by Statute Law Revision (Scotland) Act 1906 (6 Edw. 7. c. 38))
| Shipping Act 1503 (repealed) | 1503 c. 32 — | 19 March 1504 |
Of the execucioun of the act (Note: Shipping Act 1457 (c. 10)) anent salaris. Of the execution of the act regarding sailors. (Repealed by Statute Law Revision (Scotland) Act 1906 (6 Edw. 7. c. 38))
| Leagues in Burghs Act 1503 (repealed) | 1503 c. 33; 1503 c. 87 | 19 March 1504 |
Aganis ligis or bandis within burghis. Against leagues or bonds within burghs. (Repealed by Statute Law Revision (Scotland) Act 1906 (6 Edw. 7. c. 38))
| Wool, Hides, and Skins Act 1503 (repealed) | 1503 c. 34; 1503 c. 88 | 19 March 1504 |
That na man hous woll hydis nor skynnis in places outwith fre burrowis. That no man store wool, hides or skins in places outwith free burghs. (Repealed by Statute Law Revision (Scotland) Act 1906 (6 Edw. 7. c. 38))
| Precepts of Sasine Act 1503 (repealed) | 1503 c. 35; 1503 c. 89 | 19 March 1504 |
Anent the gevin of sesing be preceptis of oure soverane lordis chapell. Regarding the giving of sasines by precepts from our sovereign lord's chapel. (Repealed by Statute Law Revision (Scotland) Act 1906 (6 Edw. 7. c. 38))
| Fueing Crown Lands Act 1503 (repealed) | 1503 c. 36; 1503 c. 90 | 19 March 1504 |
Anent the setting of oure soverane lordis propir landis in fewferme. Regarding the setting of our sovereign lord's own lands in feu-farm. (Repealed by Statute Law Revision (Scotland) Act 1906 (6 Edw. 7. c. 38))
| Fueing Lands Act 1503 (repealed) | 1503 c. 37; 1503 c. 91 | 19 March 1504 |
Anent the setting of landis in fewferme be baronis and frehaldaris. Regarding the setting of lands in feu-farm by barons and freeholders. (Repealed by Statute Law Revision (Scotland) Act 1906 (6 Edw. 7. c. 38))
| Malt Makers Act 1503 (repealed) | 1503 c. 38; 1503 c. 92 | 19 March 1504 |
Of malt makaris in burrow touns. Of malt makers in burgh towns. (Repealed by Forestalling, Regrating, etc. Act 1844 (7 & 8 Vict. c. 24))
| Sheriff's Jurisdiction Act 1503 (repealed) | 1503 c. 39; 1503 c. 93 | 19 March 1504 |
Of the Jurisdictioun of landis lyand in sindry schirefdomez. Of the Jurisdiction of lands lying in various sheriffdoms. (Repealed by Statute Law Revision (Scotland) Act 1906 (6 Edw. 7. c. 38))
| Brieves of Inquest Act 1503 (repealed) | 1503 c. 40; 1503 c. 94 | 19 March 1504 |
Anent the proponing of exceptions again the brief of inqueste. Regarding the proposing of exceptions against the brieve of inquest. (Repealed by Statute Law Revision (Scotland) Act 1906 (6 Edw. 7. c. 38))
| Brieves of Right Act 1503 (repealed) | 1503 c. 41; 1503 c. 95 | 19 March 1504 |
Anent the proces of the breve of rycht and othir brevis pledabill. Regarding the process of the brieve of right and other brieves that may be sued. (Repealed by Statute Law Revision (Scotland) Act 1906 (6 Edw. 7. c. 38))
| Measures and Weights Act 1503 (repealed) | 1503 c. 42; 1503 c. 96 | 19 March 1504 |
Of mesouris and wechtis. Of measures and weights. (Repealed by Statute Law Revision (Scotland) Act 1906 (6 Edw. 7. c. 38))
| Bullion Act 1503 (repealed) | 1503 c. 43 — | 19 March 1504 |
Anent the hamebringin of bulyeon. Regarding the importing of bullion. (Repealed by Statute Law Revision (Scotland) Act 1906 (6 Edw. 7. c. 38))
| Currency Act 1503 (repealed) | 1503 c. 44; 1503 c. 97 | 19 March 1504 |
Anent money othir crakkit or flawit. Regarding money either cracked or flawed. (Repealed by Statute Law Revision (Scotland) Act 1906 (6 Edw. 7. c. 38))
| Diligence Act 1503 (repealed) | 1503 c. 45; 1503 c. 98 | 19 March 1504 |
Anent the distrenyeing of oxin hors or othir gudis pertening to the pleucht. Regarding the distraining of oxen, horses, or other goods pertaining to the plough. (Repealed by Debtors (Scotland) Act 1987 (c. 18))
| Appeals Act 1503 (repealed) | 1503 c. 46; 1503 c. 99 | 19 March 1504 |
Anent the wordis of falsing of dumys. Regarding the words of falsing of dooms. (Repealed by Statute Law Revision (Scotland) Act 1906 (6 Edw. 7. c. 38))

=== Sources ===
- Alexander, William (1841). "Acta Parliamentorum Regis Jacobi Quarti". An Abridgement of the Acts of the Parliaments of Scotland. Edinburgh: Adam and Charles Black. pp. 448–449 – via Google Books.
- Alexander, William (1841). "Acta Parliamentorum Regis Jacobi Quarti". An Abridgement of the Acts of the Parliaments of Scotland. Edinburgh: Adam and Charles Black. pp. 448–449 – via Google Books.
- Chronological Table of the Statutes. London: Her Majesty's Stationery Office. 1972. pp. 1326–1327 – via Google Books.
- "Index of Statutes: James IV (1488-1513)". Records of the Parliaments of Scotland to 1707. University of St Andrews.

== See also ==
- List of legislation in the United Kingdom
- Records of the Parliaments of Scotland
