= Lord Steward Act 1554 =

Act of the Parliament of England

Lord Steward Act 1554 (Note: The citation of this act by this short title was authorised by section 2 of, and schedule 3 to, the Statute Law (Repeals) Act 1978.)
- Act of Parliament
- Parliament of England
- Long title: An Acte for thestablishing of thoffice of the L. Steward of the Quenes Majesties most Honourable Housholde.
- Citation: 1 Mar. Sess. 3. c. 4
- Territorial extent: England and Wales

Dates
- Royal assent: 5 May 1554
- Commencement: 2 April 1554 (Note: Start of session.)
Other legislation
Repeals/revokes	King's Household Act 1540
Relates to	Lord Keeper Act 1562

Status: Current legislation

Text of statute as originally enacted

Revised text of statute as amended

Text of the Lord Steward Act 1554 as in force today (including any amendments) within the United Kingdom, from legislation.gov.uk.

The Lord Steward Act 1554 (1 Mar. Sess. 3. c. 4) is an act of the Parliament of England.

The act was omitted from the third revised edition of the statute because of its local nature.

As of 2026, the act remains in force in England and Wales.
