= Badger (occupation) =

Dealer in food or victuals carried for sale elsewhere

The word badger was, in English, a term of uncertain derivation (possibly derived from bagger, a bag or a person carrying one) for a dealer in food or victuals which he had purchased in one place and carried for sale in another place. The Oxford English Dictionary records the earliest definitive occurrence of the word in English from Bristol c. 1500, but there were bager(s)gates at York in 1243 and in Lincoln by 1252. The designation continued in use until the 19th century in Great Britain.

Badger specifically applied to those dealing in grain for food, but also referred generically to food-commodity dealers. These included those dealing in grain for brewing (maltsters) or in meal for bread-making (mealmen), while others specialised in butter and cheese. Other grains, beans, peas or even vetch were traded in years when wheat and barley prices were high.

The primary relevant statutes were the Forestallers Act 1551 (5 & 6 Edw. 6. c. 14), 'An Act against Regrators, Forestallers and Ingrossers', 1552, and the Corn, etc. Act 1562 (5 Eliz. 1, c. 12), 'An Act touching Badgers of Corn, and Drovers of Cattle to be licensed', 1563. These laws prescribed penalties against the offences of engrossing (speculative accumulation), forestalling (buying produce before it was offered in market), and regrating (buying and re-selling within the same market or within four miles). They stipulated that badgers be licensed by three justices of the peace at quarter sessions and required them to be married householders, of 30 years of age or more, and a resident in the county for at least three years. Household servants or retainers could not be badgers. In some counties justices seem to have regularly imposed limits on licences, specifying the markets where badgers could buy or sell, the quantities they could buy or the number of packhorses they could use for carrying goods between markets. The legislation also referred to kidders, drovers of livestock, laders, and carriers.

The preamble to the statute of 1562 declared that many people took up the trade of badgering seeking only to live easily and to leave their honest labour. As with much Tudor regulatory-legislation enforcement, this may better reflect the fears of central government than the reality of the trade. Although there were complaints about abuses by badgers, enforcement action varied. There are few surviving records of licensing before the Civil War of the 1640s, and jastice may not have been comprehensive. In that period most prosecutions for breaching the statutes were brought by common informers, whose reputation was poor. The licensing system is best seen as one of the powers which were available to the county justices of the peace, which they used when local conditions required or when ordered to so by the Privy Council. The legislation was repealed in 1772, but forestalling remained a common-law offence until 1844.

The contribution made by badgers to the provisioning of provincial cities and industrial towns is hard to calculate. However, it must have been significant, as local justices complained when neighbouring justices or over-zealous informers restricted badgers' activities. There are also records of local communities petitioning the justices for a nominated person to be licensed specifically to buy grain to supply their market.

The term is now obsolete.
