= Forestalling, Regrating, etc. Act 1844 =

Act of the Parliament of the United Kingdom

- Act of Parliament
- Parliament of the United Kingdom
- Long title: An Act for abolishing the Offences of forestalling, regrating, and engrossing, and for repealing certain Statutes passed in restraint of Trade.
- Citation: 7 & 8 Vict. c. 24
- Introduced by: Thomas Spring Rice, 1st Baron Monteagle of Brandon (Lords)
- Territorial extent: United Kingdom (Note: Section 1.)

Dates
- Royal assent: 4 July 1844
- Commencement: 4 July 1844
- Repealed: 20 June 1892
Other legislation
Amends	Repeal of Certain Laws Act 1772; See § Repealed enactments
Repeals/revokes	See § Repealed enactments
Repealed by	Statute Law Revision Act 1892

Status: Repealed

History of passage through Parliament

Records of Parliamentary debate relating to the statute from Hansard

Text of statute as originally enacted

The Forestalling, Regrating, etc. Act 1844 (7 & 8 Vict. c. 24) was an act of the Parliament of the United Kingdom that repealed for the United Kingdom enactments relating to forestalling, regrating and engrossing.

== Background ==
In 1772, the Repeal of Certain Laws Act 1772 (12 Geo. 3. c. 71) was passed, which repealed several statutes that had been found to prevent the free trade of commodities such as corn, meal, flour, cattle and sundry others, causing their price to increase:

WHEREAS it hath been found by experience, that the restraints laid by several statutes upon the dealing in corn, meal, flour, cattle, and sundry other sorts of victuals, by preventing a free trade in the said commodities, have a tendency to discourage the growth and to enhance the price of the same; which statutes, if put in execution, would bring great distress upon the inhabitants of many parts of this kingdom, and in particular upon those of the cities of London and Westminster.

The repeals in that act were found not to have been effectual, because of repeated prohibitions in previous acts. In 1800, John Rusby was indicted for having bought ninety quarters of oats at 41 shillings per quarter and selling thirty of them at 43 shillings the same day. Lord Kenyon, the presiding judge, argued strongly against the repealing act, and addressed the jury strongly against the accused. Rusby was heavily fined, but, on appeal, the court was equally divided as to whether engrossing, forestalling and regrating were still offences at common law.

== Passage ==
The Forestalling, etc. Offences Bill had its first reading in the House of Lords on 2 April 1844, presented by the chancellor of the exchequer, Thomas Spring Rice, 1st Baron Monteagle of Brandon. The bill had its second reading in the House of Lords on 16 April 1844 and was committed to a committee of the whole house, which met on 30 April 1844 and reported on 7 May 1844, with amendments. The amended bill had its third reading in the House of Lords on 9 May 1844 and passed, without amendments.

The bill had its first reading in the House of Commons on 14 May 1844. The bill had its second reading in the House of Commons on 22 May 1844 and was committed to a committee of the whole house, which met and reported on 3 June 1844, without amendments. The bill had its third reading in the House of Commons on 6 June 1844 and passed, without amendments.

The bill was granted royal assent on 4 July 1844.

== Repealed enactments ==
Section 2 of the act repealed 37 enactments, listed in the section, for the United Kingdom.

Section 3 of the act provided that acts repealed as to Great Britain by the Repeal of Certain Laws Act 1772 (12 Geo. 3. c. 71) were also to be repealed as to Great Britain and Ireland.

Section 4 of the act provided that nothing in the act would apply to the spreading of false rumours.

Section 5 of the act provided that the act may be amended or repealed by any act in the session of parliament during which it passed.

Parliament of England
Citation	Short title	Description	Extent of repeal
51 Hen. 3. Judicium Pillorie (Note: Cited as 51 Hen. 3. Stat. 6 in The Statutes at Large. See Statutes of uncertain date.)	Judicium Pillorie (The Judgement of the Pillory)	An Act passed in the Fifty-first Year of the Reign of King Henry the Third, intituled A Statute of the Pillory and Tumbrel, and of the Assize of Bread and Ale.	As is now in force.
12 Edw. 2. c. 6	Statutum Eborac' (Statute of York)	An Act passed in the Twelfth Year of the Reign of King Edward the Second, intituled No Officer of a City or Borough shall sell Wine or Victual during his Office.	As is now in force.
Temp. Hen. 3. Edw. 1. Edw. 2. c. 7	Statutum de Pistoribus, etc. (Statute concerning Bakers, etc.)	An Act passed in the Reign of King Henry the Third, King Edward the First, or King Edward the Second, intituled The Punishment of a Butcher selling unwholesome Flesh.	As provides Punishment for a Butcher or Cook that buyeth Flesh of Jews and selleth the same unto Christians.
Temp. Hen. 3. Edw. 1. Edw. 2 c. 10	Statutum de Pistoribus, etc. (Statute concerning Bakers, etc.)	An Act passed in One of the Three last-mentioned Reigns, intituled No Forestaller shall be suffered to dwell in any Town.	The whole act.
23 Edw. 3. c. 6	N/A	An Act passed in the Twenty-third Year of the Reign of King Edward the Third, intituled Victuals shall be sold at reasonable Prices.	The whole act.
25 Edw. 3. Stat. 4. c. 3	Aulneger, foreign and other merchants, forestalling, weirs	An Act passed in the Twenty-fifth Year of the same Reign, intituled The Penalty of him that selleth Forestall Wares, Merchandize, or Victual.	The whole act.
27 Edw. 3. Stat. 1. c. 3	Regrators	An Act passed in the Twenty-seventh of the same Reign, intituled A Statute of Provisors.	As provides that Commissions shall be granted to inquire of Offenders contrary to the Statute of 23 Edw. 3. c. 6., and as enacts, "The Penalty for forestalling of Merchandizes before they come to the Staple.
27 Edw. 3. Stat. 2. c. 11	Ordinance of the Staples 1353	An Act passed in the Twenty-seventh of the same Reign, intituled A Statute of Provisors.	As provides that Commissions shall be granted to inquire of Offenders contrary to the Statute of 23 Edw. 3. c. 6., and as enacts, "The Penalty for forestalling of Merchandizes before they come to the Staple.
31 Edw. 3. Stat. 2.	Statute of Herrings	Two Acts passed in the Thirty-first Year of the same Reign, respectively intituled The Statute of Herrings and Another Statute of Salt Fish.	The whole act.
31 Edw. 3. Stat. 3.	Statute for Salt-Fish	Two Acts passed in the Thirty-first Year of the same Reign, respectively intituled The Statute of Herrings and Another Statute of Salt Fish.	The whole act.
35 Edw. 3.	An Ordinance of Herring	An Act passed in the Thirty-fifth Year of the same Reign, intituled An Ordinance of Herring.	The whole act.
37 Edw. 3. c. 5	Statut' de Victu et Vestitu (A Statute concerning Diet and Apparel)	An Act passed in the Thirty-seventh Year of the same Reign, intituled Merchants shall not ingross Merchandizes to enhance the Prices of them, nor use but one Sort of Merchandise.	As is now in force.
37 Edw. 3. c. 15	Statut' de Victu et Vestitu (A Statute concerning Diet and Apparel)	An Act passed in the same Year, intituled Clothiers shall make Cloths sufficient for the foresaid Prices, so that this Statute for default of such Cloth be in nowise infringed.	The whole act. (Note: This act was repealed again by the Repeal of Obsolete Statutes Act 1856 ((19 & 20 Vict. c. 64))
2 Rich. 2. Stat. 1. c. 2	Confirmation of statutes	An Act passed in the Second Year of the Reign of King Richard the Second, intituled A Confirmation of the Statute of 25 Edw. 3. St. 4. c. 3, against Forestallers.	The whole act.
13 Rich. 2. Stat. 1. c. 8	Statute of Victuallers and Hostellers 1389	An Act passed in the Thirteenth Year of the same Reign, intituled The Rates of Labourers Wages shall be assessed and proclaimed by the Justices of the Peace, and they shall cause the Gains of Victuallers; and shall make Horse Bread, and the Weight and Price thereof.	As is now in force.
4 Hen. 4. c. 25	Hostlers	Act passed in the Fourth Year of the Reign of King Henry the Fourth, intituled An Hostler shall not make Horse Bread; how much he may take for Oats.	As is now in force.
25 Hen. 8. c. 2	Price of Victuals Act 1533	An Act passed in the Twenty-fifth Year of the Reign of King Henry the Eighth, intituled Proclamations for the Prices of Victuals, viz. the pricing of them and proclaiming the Prices.	As is now in force.
28 Hen. 8. c. 14	Wines Act 1536	An Act passed in the Twenty-eighth Year of the same Reign, intituled For Prices of Wines, as is now in force, and relates to the gauging and measuring of Wine, Oils, Honey, or any other Liquors or Things.	As is now in force. (Note: This act was repealed wholly by the Statute Law Revision Act 1863. The notes to the Statute Law Revision Act 1863 state: "Repealed in part (ss. 1-7) by 7 & 8 Vict. c. 24. s. 2. (Previously repealed in part by 21 Jac. 1. c. 28. s. 11.) Residue seems virtually repealed by repeal of— 1 Ric. 2. c. 13. by 3 Geo. 5. c. 41. s. 1. (and see 3 Geo. 5. c. 16. s. 23.) If not, obsolete or unnecessary.")
3 & 4 Edw. 6. c. 19	Buying Cattle Act 1549	Two Acts passed in the Session of Parliament holden in the Third and Fourth Years of the Reign of King Edward the Sixth, respectively intituled An Act for buying of tanned Leather, and An Act for the Sale of Salt Fish and Stock Fish, and for the buying and selling of Butter and Cheese.	As is now in force.
3 & 4 Edw. 6. c. 21	Butter and Cheese Act 1549	Two Acts passed in the Session of Parliament holden in the Third and Fourth Years of the Reign of King Edward the Sixth, respectively intituled An Act for buying of tanned Leather, and An Act for the Sale of Salt Fish and Stock Fish, and for the buying and selling of Butter and Cheese.	As is now in force.
5 & 6 Edw. 6. c. 15	Regratours of Tanned Leather Act 1551	an Act passed in the Session of Parliament holden in the Fifth and Sixth Years of the same Reign, intituled An Act against Regrators and Ingrossers of tanned Leather.	Except the Prohibition of carrying or dressing tanned Leather within the City of London and Three Miles thereof as is provided by the last-mentioned Act

Parliament of Scotland
Citation	Short title	Description	Extent of repeal
1503. c. 38 (S)	Malt Makers Act 1503	An Act passed in the Year One thousand five hundred and eight, intituled Of Of Malt Makaris in Burrow Touns.	The whole act.
1535. c. 26 (S)	Forestallers Act 1535	An Act passed in the Year One thousand five hundred and thirty-five, intituled Off Forestallaris.	The whole act.
1540. c. 16 (S)	Food Supply Act 1540	An Act passed in the Year One thousand five hundred and forty, intituled For eschewing of Derth of Vittails, Flesche, and Lyvestis.	The whole act.
1540. c. 18 (S)	Wine, Salt and Timber Act 1540	An Act of the same Year, intituled For stanching of Derth and Prices of Wine, Salt, and Victuallis.	The whole act.
1540. c. 32 (S)	Forestallers Act 1540	An Act of the same Year, intituled Anentis Forestallaris	The whole act.
1555. c. 35 (S)	Wine, Salt, etc. Act 1555	An Act passed in the Year One thousand five hundred and fifty-five, intituled Anent the Disposition of Wyne, Salt, and Tymmer brocht into the Realme.	The whole act.
1579. c. 26 (S)	Forestallers Act 1579	An Act passed in the Year One thousand five hundred and seventy-nine, intituled For Punishment of Regrateris and Forestallaris.	The whole act.
1592. c. 70 (S)	Forestallers Act 1592	An Act passed in the Year One thousand five hundred and ninety-two, intituled Agains Foirstallaris and Regrateris.	The whole act.
1661. c. 280 (S)	Manufactories Act 1661	An Act passed in the Year One thousand six hundred and sixty-one, intituled An Act for erecting of Manufactories.	The whole act.

Parliament of Ireland
Citation	Short title	Description	Extent of repeal
4 Edw. 4. c. 2 (I)	N/A	An Act passed in the Fourth Year of the Reign of King Edward the Fourth, intituled An Act against Engrossers and Regrators of Corn.	The whole act.
33 Hen. 8. c. 2 (I) (Note: The text of the act incorrectly cites this as 37 Hen. 8. c. 2.)	N/A	An Act passed in the Thirty-third Year of the Reign of King Henry the Eighth, intituled An Act for Grey Merchants, as revived and perpetuated by a subsequent Act passed in the Seventh Year of the Reign of Queen Elizabeth (Note: 11 Eliz. 1. c. 4), intituled An Act for reviving the Statute against Grey Merchants, the Statute for Servants Wages, and the Statute of Jeofails.	The whole act.
2 Anne. c. 15 (I)	Sale of Livestock Act 1703	An Act passed in the Second Year of the Reign of Queen Anne, intituled An Act to prevent Butchers from being Graziers, and to redress several Abuses in buying and selling of Cattle, which Act is perpetuated by another Act made in the Ninth Year of the Reign of Queen Anne (Note: 9 Ann. c. 7).	As prohibits any Butcher from being a Grazier, or keeping in his Possession, or in trust for him, above Twenty Acres of Land, or from carrying any Cattle to any other Butcher in Dublin, or within Five Miles thereof, or from keeping at Hay or Feed Oxen or other Cattle for above Ten Days, or from exposing for sale any Oxen or other Cattle within Twenty Miles of the Place where bought; and which prohibits any Person from selling or exposing for sale any Cattle or Sheep on the same Day when bought
10 Geo. 1. c. 10 (I)	Sale of Livestock Act 1723	An Act passed in the Tenth Year of the Reign of King George the First, intituled An Act for regulating Abuses committed in buying and selling Cattle and Sheep in the several Markets of this Kingdom.	As prohibits Cattle from being bought within Six Miles of any Market I.e., section 1.
15 Geo. 2. c. 9 (I)	N/A	An Act passed in the Fifteenth Year of the Reign of King George the Second, intituled An Act to explain and amend a Clause in an Act passed in the Second Year of the Reign of Queen Anne, intituled 'An Act to prohibit Butchers from being Graziers, and to redress several Abuses in buying and selling of Cattle, and in slaughtering, and packing of Beef, Tallow, and Hides'.	The whole act.
31 Geo. 2. c. 8 (I)	N/A	An Act passed in the Thirty-first Year of the Reign of King George the Second, intituled An Act to prohibit Salesmen from being Graziers, and to redress several Abuses in buying and selling Cattle and Meat.	The whole act.
13 & 14 Geo. 3. c. 22 (I)	N/A	An Act passed in the Session of Parliament holden in the Thirteenth and Fourteenth Years of the Reign of King George the Third, intituled An Act for the better Supply of the City of Dublin.	As authorizes a Market Jury to seize Provisions or Victuals in the Hands of any Forestaller, Regrater, or Engrosser. I.e., section 73.
27 Geo. 3. c. 46 (I)	N/A	an Act passed in the Twenty-seventh Year of the Reign of King George the Third, intituled An Act for establishing Market Juries in Cities.	As authorizes and empowers certain Market Juries to seize Provisions or Victuals found in the Hands of Forestallers, Regraters, and Engrossers. I.e., section 3.

== Subsequent developments ==
Several acts repealed by this act were subsequently repealed again by later Statute Law Revision Acts, either accidentally or for the avoidance of doubt, including:

- Repeal of Obsolete Statutes Act 1856 (19 & 20 Vict. c. 64)
- Statute Law Revision Act 1863 (26 & 27 Vict. c. 125)

The whole act was repealed by section 1 of, and the schedule to, the Statute Law Revision Act 1892 (55 & 56 Vict. c. 19) as it was spent, which came into force on 20 June 1892.
