= Statute Concerning Diet and Apparel 1363 =

Act of Parliament of England

Act of Apparel 1363
- Act of Parliament
- Parliament of England
- Long title: A Statute Concerning Diet and Apparel.
- Citation: 37 Edw. 3. cc. 1, 3 - 19
- Territorial extent: England and Wales; Ireland

Dates
- Royal assent: 1363
- Commencement: 1363
- Repealed: 10 August 1872

Other legislation
- Amends: 27 Edw. 3 Stat. 1. cc. 5 & 7
- Amended by: Forestalling, Regrating, etc. Act 1844; Statute Law Revision Act 1863; Civil Procedure Acts Repeal Act 1879
- Repealed by: Statute Law (Ireland) Revision Act 1873

Status: Repealed

Text of statute as originally enacted

A Statute Concerning Diet and Apparel (37 Edw. 3. cc. 1, 3 - 19) (Latin: Statut' de Victu et Vestitu) was a sumptuary law introduced by the Parliament of England in 1363. It was one of a series of laws over a couple of centuries that form what are known as the Acts of Apparel.

The act detailed the style of dress that people of each class were allowed to wear. It was created to tackle a burgeoning trend for the lower classes to wear similar fashion to the elite. This was triggered by the sudden rise in personal wealth that followed the Black Death, caused by the consolidation of property following the drop in population and the considerable rises in wages which liberated many previously bonded labourers.

== Legacy ==
The act was extended to Ireland by Poynings' Law 1495 (10 Hen. 7. c. 22 (I)).

The whole act was repealed for England and Wales by section 1 of, and the schedule to, the Statute Law Revision Act 1863 (26 & 27 Vict. c. 125) and for Ireland by section 1 of, and the schedule to, the Statute Law (Ireland) Revision Act 1872 (35 & 36 Vict. c. 98).
