= Lord Keeper Act 1562 =

Act of the Parliament of England

Lord Keeper Act 1562 (Note: The citation of this act by this short title was authorised by section 5 of, and the second schedule to, the Statute Law Revision Act 1948. Due to the repeal of those provisions, it is now authorised by section 19(2) of the Interpretation Act 1978.)
- Act of Parliament
- Parliament of England
- Long title: An Acte declaring thauctoritee of the L. Keeper of the Great Seale of England and the L. Chancellor to bee one. (Note: These words are printed against this act in the second column of the second schedule to the Statute Law Revision Act 1948, which is headed "Title".)
- Citation: 5 Eliz. 1. c. 18
- Territorial extent: England and Wales

Dates
- Royal assent: 10 April 1563
- Commencement: 11 January 1563 (Note: Start of session.)
- Repealed: 1 January 1970

Other legislation
- Repealed by: Statute Law (Repeals) Act 1969
- Relates to: Lord Steward Act 1554

Status: Repealed

Text of statute as originally enacted

The Lord Keeper Act 1562 (5 Eliz. 1. c. 18) was an act of the Parliament of England. It made the Lord Keeper of the Great Seal "entitled to like place, pre-eminence, jurisdiction, execution of laws, and all other customs, commodities, and advantages as the Lord Chancellor."

== Subsequent developments ==
The whole act was repealed by section 1 of, and part I of the schedule to, the Statute Law (Repeals) Act 1969, which came into force on 1 January 1970.
