= List of acts of the Parliament of England from 1562 =

This is a list of acts of the Parliament of England for the year 1562.

For acts passed during the period 1707–1800, see the list of acts of the Parliament of Great Britain. See also the list of acts of the Parliament of Scotland, and the list of acts of the Parliament of Ireland.

For acts passed from 1801 onwards, see the list of acts of the Parliament of the United Kingdom. For acts of the devolved parliaments and assemblies in the United Kingdom, see the list of acts of the Scottish Parliament, the list of acts of the Northern Ireland Assembly, and the list of acts and measures of Senedd Cymru; see also the list of acts of the Parliament of Northern Ireland.

For medieval statutes, etc. that are not considered to be acts of Parliament, see the list of English statutes.

See also the List of ordinances and acts of the Parliament of England, 1642–1660 for ordinances and acts passed by the Long Parliament and other bodies without royal assent, and which were not considered to be valid legislation following the Restoration in 1660.

The number shown after each act's title is its chapter number. Acts are cited using this number, preceded by the years of the reign during which the relevant parliamentary session was held; thus the Union with Ireland Act 1800 is cited as "39 & 40 Geo. 3. c. 67", meaning the 67th act passed during the session that started in the 39th year of the reign of George III and which finished in the 40th year of that reign. The modern convention is to use Arabic numerals in citations (thus "41 Geo. 3" rather than "41 Geo. III"). Acts of the last session of the Parliament of Great Britain and the first session of the Parliament of the United Kingdom are both cited as "41 Geo. 3".

Acts passed by the Parliament of England did not have a short title; however, some of these acts have subsequently been given a short title by acts of the Parliament of the United Kingdom, such as the Short Titles Act 1896 (59 & 60 Vict. c. 14).

Acts passed by the Parliament of England were deemed to have come into effect on the first day of the session in which they were passed. Because of this, the years given in the list below may in fact be the year before a particular act was passed.

== 5 Eliz. 1 ==
The first session of the 2nd Parliament of Queen Elizabeth I, which met from 11 January 1563 until 10 April 1563.

This session was traditionally cited as 5 Eliz., 5 Elz. or 5 El.

=== Public acts ===
Short title	Citation	Royal assent
Long title
Supremacy of the Crown Act 1562 (repealed)	5 Eliz. 1. c. 1	10 April 1563
An Act for the Assurance of the Queen's Royal Power over all Estates and Subjects within her Dominions. (Repealed for England and Wales by Religious Disabilities Act 1846 (9 & 10 Vict. c. 59) and for the Isle of Man by Statute Law Revision (Isle of Man) Act 1991 (c. 61))
Tillage Act 1562 (repealed)	5 Eliz. 1. c. 2	10 April 1563
An Act for the maintenance and increase of tillage. (Repealed by Continuance, etc. of Laws Act 1623 (21 Jas. 1. c. 28))
Poor Act 1562 (repealed)	5 Eliz. 1. c. 3	10 April 1563
An Act for the relief of the poor. (Repealed by Vagabonds Act 1572 (14 Eliz. 1. c. 5))
Statute of Artificers 1562 or the Artificers and Apprentices Act 1563 or the Statute of Labourers 1562 or the Act of Apprentices 1563 (repealed)	5 Eliz. 1. c. 4	10 April 1563
An Act containing divers Orders for Artificers, Labourers, Servants of Husbandry, and Apprentices. (Repealed by Conspiracy and Protection of Property Act 1875 (38 & 39 Vict. c. 86))
Maintenance of the Navy Act 1562 (repealed)	5 Eliz. 1. c. 5	10 April 1563
An Act touching Politick Constitutions for the Maintenance of the Navy. (Repealed by Sea Fisheries Act 1868 (31 & 32 Vict. c. 45))
Foreign Stuffs Act 1562 (repealed)	5 Eliz. 1. c. 6	10 April 1563
An Act against such as shall sell any ware for apparel without ready money. (Repealed by Statute Law Revision Act 1863 (26 & 27 Vict. c. 125))
Importation Act 1562 (repealed)	5 Eliz. 1. c. 7	10 April 1563
An Act avoiding divers foreign Wares made by Handicraftsmen beyond the Seas. (Repealed by Repeal of Acts Concerning Importation Act 1822 (3 Geo. 4. c. 41))
Leather Act 1562 (repealed)	5 Eliz. 1. c. 8	10 April 1563
An Act touching tanners, curriers, shoemakers, and other artificers occupying the cutting of leather. (Repealed by Repeal of Obsolete Statutes Act 1856 (19 & 20 Vict. c. 64))
Perjury Act 1562 (repealed)	5 Eliz. 1. c. 9	10 April 1563
An Act for the punishment of such persons as shall procure or commit any wilful perjury. (Repealed by Perjury Act 1911 (1 & 2 Geo. 5. c. 6))
Embezzlement Act 1562 (repealed)	5 Eliz. 1. c. 10	10 April 1563
An Act to revive a statute made Anno 21 of Henry the Eighth (Note: Embezzlement Act 1529 (21 Hen. 8. c. 7)) touching servants imbezilling their masters goods. (Repealed for England and Wales by Criminal Statutes Repeal Act 1827 (7 & 8 Geo. 4. c. 27) and for India by Criminal Law (India) Act 1828 (9 Geo. 4. c. 74))
Clipping Coin Act 1562 (repealed)	5 Eliz. 1. c. 11	10 April 1563
An Act against the clipping washing rounding or filing of coins. (Repealed by Coinage Offences Act 1832 (2 & 3 Will. 4. c. 34))
Corn, etc. Act 1562 (repealed)	5 Eliz. 1. c. 12	10 April 1563
An Act touching Badgers of Corn and Drovers of Cattle, to be licensed. (Repealed by Repeal of Certain Laws Act 1772 (12 Geo. 3. c. 71))
Highways Act 1562 (repealed)	5 Eliz. 1. c. 13	10 April 1563
An Act for the Continuance of the Statute made 2 & 3 P. & M. (Note: Highways Act 1555 (2 & 3 Ph. & M. c. 8)) for the Amendment of Highways. (Repealed by Highways (No. 2) Act 1766 (7 Geo. 3. c. 42))
Forgery Act 1562 (repealed)	5 Eliz. 1. c. 14	10 April 1563
An Act against the forging of evidences and writings. (Repealed by Forgery Act 1830 (11 Geo. 4. & 1 Will. 4. c. 66))
False Prophecies Act 1562 (repealed)	5 Eliz. 1. c. 15	10 April 1563
An Act against fond and fantastical prophecies. (Repealed by Statute Law Revision Act 1863 (26 & 27 Vict. c. 125))
Witchcraft Act 1562 (repealed)	5 Eliz. 1. c. 16	10 April 1563
An Act Against Conjurations, Enchantments and Witchcrafts. (Repealed by Witchcraft Act 1603 (1 Jas. 1. c. 12))
Sodomy Act 1562 (repealed)	5 Eliz. 1. c. 17	10 April 1563
An Act for the Punishment of the Vice of Buggery. (Repealed by Offences Against the Person Act 1828 (9 Geo. 4. c. 31) and for India by Criminal Law (India) Act 1828 (9 Geo. 4. c. 74))
Lord Keeper Act 1562 (repealed)	5 Eliz. 1. c. 18	10 April 1563
An Acte declaring thauctoritee of the L. Keeper of the Great Seale of England and the L. Chancellor to bee one. (Repealed by Statute Law (Repeals) Act 1969 (c. 52))
Exportation Act 1562 (repealed)	5 Eliz. 1. c. 19	10 April 1563
An Act for the repeal of a branch of a statute made Anno 1 Edw. 6. (Note: Exportation Act 1547 (1 Edw. 6. c. 5)) touching the conveying of horses and geldings out of this realm. (Repealed by Statute Law Revision Act 1863 (26 & 27 Vict. c. 125))
Egyptians Act 1562 (repealed)	5 Eliz. 1. c. 20	10 April 1563
An Act for further Punishment of Vagabonds, calling themselves Egyptians. (Repealed by Egyptians Act 1783 (23 Geo. 3. c. 51))
Unlawful Fishing, etc. Act 1562 (repealed)	5 Eliz. 1. c. 21	10 April 1563
An Act for the punishment of unlawful taking of fish, deer, or hawks. (Repealed for England and Wales by Criminal Statutes Repeal Act 1827 (7 & 8 Geo. 4. c. 27) and for India by Criminal Law (India) Act 1828 (9 Geo. 4. c. 74))
Exportation (No. 2) Act 1562 (repealed)	5 Eliz. 1. c. 22	10 April 1563
An Act against the carrying of sheep-skins and pelts over the sea, not being staple ware. (Repealed by Repeal of Acts Concerning Importation Act 1822 (3 Geo. 4. c. 41))
Writ De Excommunicato Capiendo Act 1562 (repealed)	5 Eliz. 1. c. 23	10 April 1563
An Acte for the due Execucion of the Writ De Excommunicato capiendo. (Repealed by Ecclesiastical Jurisdiction Measure 1963 (No. 1))
Gaols Act 1562 (repealed)	5 Eliz. 1. c. 24	10 April 1563
An Act for the reviving of a made anno 23 H. 8. (Note: Gaols Act 1531 (23 Hen. 8 c. 2)) touching repairing of gaols. (Repealed by Statute Law Revision Act 1863 (26 & 27 Vict. c. 125))
Juries Act 1562 (repealed)	5 Eliz. 1. c. 25	10 April 1563
An Act for filling up juries De circumstantibus, lacking in Wales. (Repealed for England and Wales by Juries Act 1825 (6 Geo. 4. c. 50) and for Ireland by Exchequer, Equity Side (Ireland) Act 1825 (6 Geo. 4. c. 60))
Enrolment of Indentures Act 1562 (repealed)	5 Eliz. 1. c. 26	10 April 1563
An Act for the inrollment of indentures of bargain and sale in the Queen's majesty's courts of record at Lancaster, Chester, and Durham. (Repealed by Law of Property (Amendment) Act 1924 (15 & 16 Geo. 5. c. 5))
Fines of Land Act 1562 (repealed)	5 Eliz. 1. c. 27	10 April 1563
An Act touching fines to be levied in the county palatine of Durham. (Repealed by Statute Law Revision Act 1863 (26 & 27 Vict. c. 125))
Translation of Bible, etc. into Welsh Act 1562 (repealed)	5 Eliz. 1. c. 28	10 April 1563
An Acte for the translating of the Bible and the Dyvine Service into the Welshe Tongue. (Repealed by Statute Law (Repeals) Act 1973 (c. 39))
Taxation Act 1562 (repealed)	5 Eliz. 1. c. 29	10 April 1563
An Act for the confirmation of a subsidy granted by the clergy. (Repealed by Statute Law Revision Act 1863 (26 & 27 Vict. c. 125))
Act of General Pardon 1562 (repealed)	5 Eliz. 1. c. 30	10 April 1563
An act of the Queen's majesty's most gracious general and free pardon. (Repealed by Statute Law Revision Act 1863 (26 & 27 Vict. c. 125))
Taxation (No. 2) Act 1562 (repealed)	5 Eliz. 1. c. 31	10 April 1563
An Act for a subsidy and two fifteenths and tenths granted by temporalty. (Repealed by Statute Law Revision Act 1863 (26 & 27 Vict. c. 125))
Expenses of the Queen's Household Act 1562 (repealed)	5 Eliz. 1. c. 32	10 April 1563
An act of assignment of certain sums of money to defray the charges of the Queen's majesty's houshold. (Repealed by Statute Law Revision Act 1863 (26 & 27 Vict. c. 125))

=== Private acts ===
Short title	Citation	Royal assent
Long title
City of Exeter Act 1562	5 Eliz. 1. c. 1 Pr.	10 April 1563
An Acte for the Confirmacion of certayn Lyberties granted to the Citie of Exetour.
Southampton (Importation of Wine) Act 1562	5 Eliz. 1. c. 2 Pr.	10 April 1563
An Acte for the Confirmacion of tres Patents granted to the Towne of Sowthampton towching the bringing in of Malmesies and other sweet Wynes by Marchant Strangers.
Viscount Byndon's Estate Act 1562	5 Eliz. 1. c. 3 Pr.	10 April 1563
An Acte tenhable the Vicounte Byndon and Dame Elizabethe his Wyfe to make Leases for three lyves or for xxj yeres.
Authorising Lord Abergavenny to grant leases for 21 years.	5 Eliz. 1. c. 4 Pr.	10 April 1563
An Acte taucthorise the Lorde Burgavenny to make leases for xxj yeres.
Howarde's Estate Act 1562	5 Eliz. 1. c. 5 Pr.	10 April 1563
An Acte to restrayne Henry Howarde from discontynuing any his Landes.
Royal Grammar School Guildford Annuity Act 1562	5 Eliz. 1. c. 6 Pr.	10 April 1563
An Acte touching one Annuytye graunted for the fyndyng of a Scoole in Guldeforde.
Plumstead Marsh Inclosure and Drainage Act 1562	5 Eliz. 1. c. 7 Pr.	10 April 1563
An Acte for the Recoverye and Inning of Plumsted Mershe nowe overflowed withe Water.
Restitution in blood of Lord Husseye's children.	5 Eliz. 1. c. 8 Pr.	10 April 1563
An Acte to restore in Bloodde the Sonnes and Doughters of the late Lorde Huseye.
Restitution in blood of William West.	5 Eliz. 1. c. 9 Pr.	10 April 1563
An Acte for the Restiucion in Bloude of Willyam West.
Restitution in blood of Sir Peter Carewe.	5 Eliz. 1. c. 10 Pr.	10 April 1563
An Acte for the Restitucion in Bloude of Sir Peter Carewe Knight.
Restitution in blood of Sir Ralph Chamberlaine and John Harleston.	5 Eliz. 1. c. 11 Pr.	10 April 1563
An Acte for the Restitucion in Bloude of Sir Raufe Chamberlyne Knight and John Harlston Esquier.
Restitution in blood of Brooke or Cobham, Cromer, Vaughan and others.	5 Eliz. 1. c. 12 Pr.	10 April 1563
An Acte for the Restitucion in Bloodd of Thomas Brooke als Cobham Willyam Cromer Cuthbert Vaughan and others.
Restitution in blood of Thomas Isley's heirs.	5 Eliz. 1. c. 13 Pr.	10 April 1563
An Acte for the Restitucion in Bloode of the Heyres of Thomas Isley Esquier.
Thomas's Restitution Act 1562	5 Eliz. 1. c. 14 Pr.	10 April 1563
An Acte for the Restitucion in Bloude of Anne Thomas, daughter and Heyres of Willyam Thomas Esquier.
Restitution in blood of Thomas and James Diggs.	5 Eliz. 1. c. 15 Pr.	10 April 1563
An Acte for the Restitucion in Bloodd of theires of Leonerde Diggs.
Restitution in blood of Thomas Cranmer's heirs.	5 Eliz. 1. c. 16 Pr.	10 April 1563
An Act for the Restiucion in Bloude of the Children of Thomas Cranmer late Archebisshopp of Contorburie.
Restitution in blood of William and Edward Isleye.	5 Eliz. 1. c. 17 Pr.	10 April 1563
An Act for the Restiucion in Bloude of Willyam Isleye and Edwarde Isleye Esquires.
Restitution in blood of Edward Turner.	5 Eliz. 1. c. 18 Pr.	10 April 1563
An Acte for the Restiucion in Bloud of Edwarde Turnor.
Denization of children of John Fitzwilliams, James Harvye and others.	5 Eliz. 1. c. 19 Pr.	10 April 1563
An Acte to make free Denizens the Children of John Fitzwillyams James Harvye, &c. being borne beyonde the Seas.

=== Sources ===
- "5° Eliz.". The Statutes of the Realm. Vol. 4 Part 1: 1547 to 1584. pp. 401–482 – via HathiTrust.
- Pickering, Danby, ed. (1763). "Anno quinto Elizabethæ". The Statutes at Large. Vol. 6: from the First Year of Queen Mary to the Thirty-fifth Year of Queen Elizabeth, inclusive. Cambridge: Joseph Bentham. pp. 151–228 – via Internet Archive.
- Pickering, Danby, ed. (1763). "Anno quinto Elizabethæ". The Statutes at Large. Vol. 6: from the First Year of Queen Mary to the Thirty-fifth Year of Queen Elizabeth, inclusive. Cambridge: Joseph Bentham. pp. 151–228 – via Internet Archive.
- Journal of the House of Commons. Vol. 1 – 1547-1629. His Majesty's Stationery Office. 1802 – via British History Online.
- Journal of the House of Lords. Vol. 1: 1509-1577. London: His Majesty's Stationery Office. 1830 – via British History Online.
- Chronological Table of and Index to the Statutes. Vol. 1: To the End of the Session 59 Vict. Sess. 2 (1895) (13th ed.). London: Her Majesty's Stationery Office. 1896. pp. 59–60 – via Google Books.
- Chronological Table of the Statutes: Covering the Period from 1235 to the End of 1971. London: Her Majesty's Stationery Office. 1972. pp. 56–57. ISBN 978-0-11-840096-1 – via Google Books.
- "Chronological Tables of the Private and Personal Acts: Part 1 (1539–1601)". legislation.gov.uk. The National Archives.

== See also ==
- List of acts of the Parliament of England
