= Engrossing (law) =

Crime in English, Welsh and Irish common law

Engrossing, forestalling and regrating were marketing offences in English, Welsh and Irish common law. The terms were used to describe unacceptable methods of influencing the market, sometimes by creating a local monopoly for a certain good, usually food. The terms were often used together, and with overlapping meanings. They became obsolete in 1844.

Blackstone's Commentaries described them as offences against public trade:

Forestalling—the buying or contracting for any merchandise or victual coming in the way of the market; or dissuading persons from bringing their goods or provisions there; or persuading them to enhance the price, when there; any of which practices make the market dearer to the fair trader.

Regrating—the buying of corn or other dead victual, in any market, and selling it again at the same market, or within four miles of the place. For this also enhances the prices of the provisions, as every successive seller must have a successive profit.

Engrossing—the getting into one's possession, or buying up, large quantities of corn, or other dead victuals, with intent to sell them again. This must of course be injurious to the public, by putting it in the power of one or two rich men to raise the price of provisions at their own discretion.

Blackstone described a monopoly as "the same offence in other branches of trade", i.e., not food.

== Forestalling ==
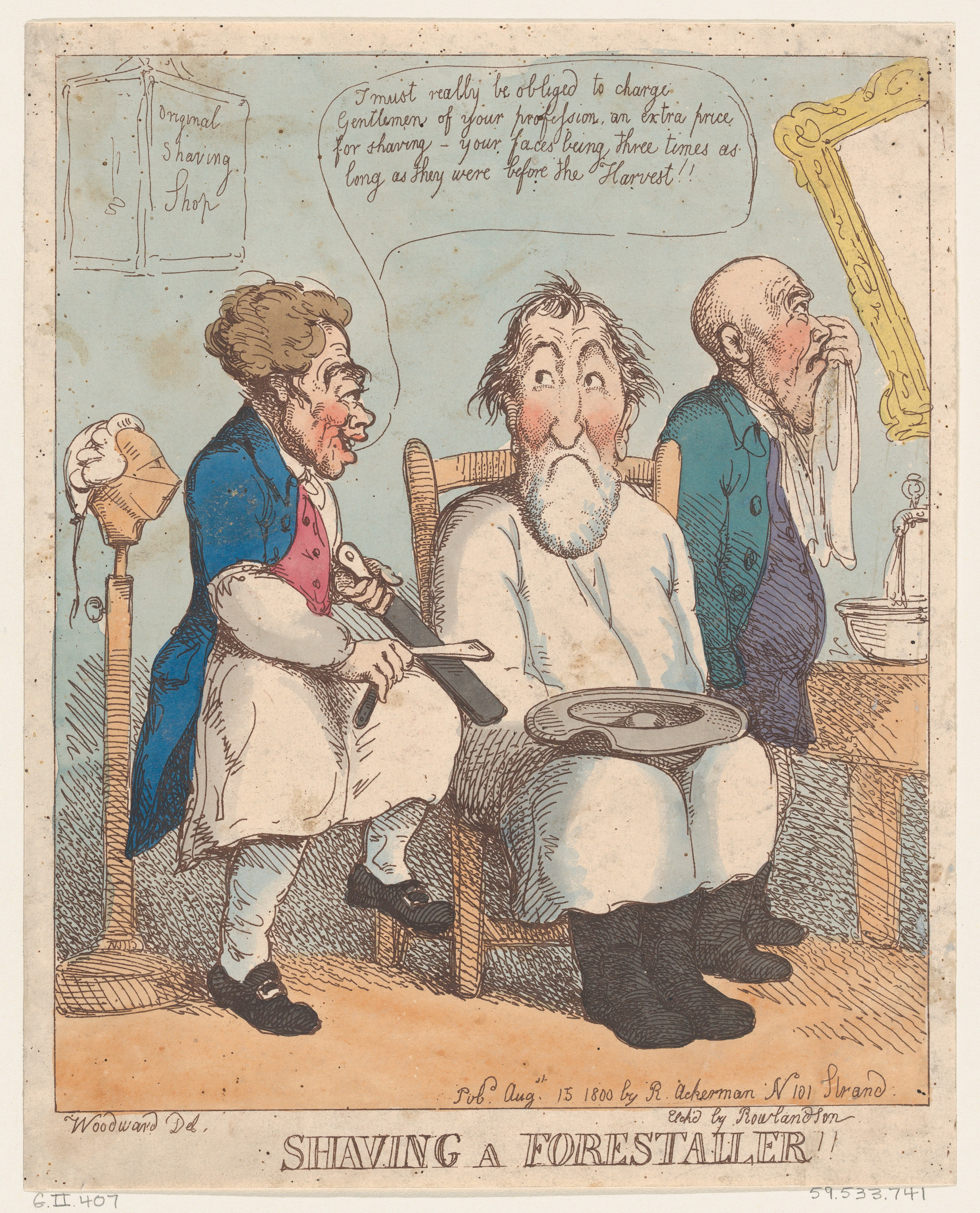
"Shaving a Forestaller", 1800 etching. The barber says "I must really be obliged to charge gentlemen of your profession an extra price for shaving — your faces being three times as long as they were before the harvest!"

Blackstone says that this was a common law offence. The derivation does not come from setting up a stall in front of another but buying before the goods got to a stall in open market. Typically, forestalling referred to the practice of intercepting sellers on their way to a market, buying up their stock, then taking it to the market and marking it up, which is a type of arbitrage. It could also mean the creation of partnerships or agreements under which goods would not be brought to market. Forestalling is often used and understood as a catch-all clause for marketing offences.

The Domesday Book recorded that "foresteel" (i.e. forestalling, the practice of buying up goods before they reach market and then inflating the prices) was one of three forfeitures that King Edward the Confessor could carry out through England. As early as 1321 the practice of forestalling was recognized as a specific offence and was regulated in London in the early twelfth century, and in other cities and towns, including goods coming by land or sea. However, originally the word itself was not used. In the laws of Henry I of England forestalling was the crime of assault on the highway, an offence against the King's Peace. It acquired the meaning of the marketing offence through the distribution of the regulations of the Marshalsea whose officers were empowered by Edward I of England to regulate trade in the shires. In time these regulations became known as the Statute of Forestallers, though probably never passed by any formal process. The laws provided for heavy penalties against forestalling. In practice the normal penalty was a fine, or, for repeated cases, exposure in the pillory.

== The Act against Regrators, Forestallers and Engrossers ==
In 1552 Edward VI's Parliament passed the Forestallers Act 1551 (5 & 6 Edw. 6. c. 14), to regulate trade, saying in the preamble, as so often, that previous laws had proved inadequate, .

The act excluded from the penalties it imposed the purchase and sale "in open Fair or Market" of "corn, Fish, Butter or Cheese, by any such badger, Lader, Kidder, or Carrier" as was granted a licence by three justices of the peace from the county in which he dwelt.

== The Act Touching Badgers of Corn and Drovers of Cattle, to be licensed ==
Corn, etc. Act 1562
- Act of Parliament
- Parliament of England
- Long title: An Act touching Badgers of Corn and Drovers of Cattle, to be licensed.
- Citation: 5 Eliz. 1. c. 12

Dates
- Royal assent: 10 April 1563
- Commencement: 11 January 1563 (Note: Start of session.)
- Repealed: 9 June 1772
Other legislation
| Repealed by | Repeal of Certain Laws Act 1772 |
| Relates to | Forestallers Act 1551; Continuance of Laws Act 1571 |

Status: Repealed

Text of statute as originally enacted

Like its precursors this act was perceived to be inadequate. So in 1562 the Parliament of Elizabeth I passed a further act, the Corn, etc. Act 1562 (5 Eliz. 1. c. 12), tightening the regulation of badgers and drovers. The act recited that "such a great Number of Persons seeking only to live easily, and to leave their honest Labour, have and do daily seek to be allowed and licensed... being most unfit and unmet for those Purposes... diminishing the Number of good and necessary Husbandmen".

Under this act a licence could only be granted under strict conditions. Badgers had to be male, resident in the shire for 3 years, householders, (have been) married, and 30 years of age, or more. Household servants or retainers could not apply. In addition to buy corn or grain out of market or fair to sell again, the licence had to contain "express words" allowing this. Licences could only be granted at quarter sessions, and by three justices, of whom one had to be of the Quorum. Each one had to sign and seal the licence. The licence could be granted for no more than a year, and all licences expired on 1 May unless expressed to last longer. The justices were entitled, but not required, to require a "bond or surety" by recognizance from or for the badger. This could be up to £5, the maximum penalty for a first offence against the act. The clerk of the peace, or deputy clerk, but no lesser officer, had to write out the licence, which cost 12 pence, and to enter the terms of licences in a register, which had to be produced at the quarter sessions.

The act was written in very detailed terms. The stringent technical requirements suggest that the legislature were concerned not only that markets were being threatened by competition from unregulated traders but also that licences were too freely available, either legitimately because the justices did not know how many were being granted, but also that they were being obtained illegally, perhaps from corrupt court officials or counterfeiters. Counterfeit licences for vagabonds and others were a constant problem. In practice, licences were granted outside these conditions, including to women.

Although badgers, in common with most travellers in medieval and Elizabethan times, were required to have a licence, and presumably carried it with them and produced it if challenged. There was no requirement in the legislation for them to wear a badge. There is anecdotal reference to it, and it is possible that in practice there was a custom or habit for them to do so, or be required to do so at some markets, (e.g., Smithfield Market).

== Repeal ==
The Acts regulating badgers were repealed in 1772 by the Repeal of Certain Laws Act 1772. However, it was found not to have effectually repealed them because of repeated prohibitions in previous Acts. In 1800, one called John Rusby was indicted for having bought ninety quarters of oats at 41 shillings per quarter and selling thirty of them at 43 shillings the same day. Lord Kenyon, the presiding judge, argued strongly against the repealing act, and addressed the jury strongly against the accused. Rusby was heavily fined, but, on appeal, the court was equally divided as to whether engrossing, forestalling and regrating were still offences at common law. Another repealing act was required in 1844 when the Forestalling, Regrating, etc. Act 1844 (7 & 8 Vict. c. 24), An Act for abolishing the Offences of Forestalling, regrating and engrossing, and for repealing certain Statutes passed in restraint of Trade, finally tidied up the law by repealing 19 other acts of Parliament passed between the reigns of Henry III and Edward VI.

== Bibliography ==
- W. Blackstone, Commentaries on the Laws of England, vol IV, 15th Ed. London 1809, p. 157-8.
- Britnell, R.H., Forstall, forestalling and the Statute of Forestallers, English Historical Review, 102, 1987, p. 89-102
