= Records of the Parliaments of Scotland =

The Records of the Parliaments of Scotland to 1707 is an online publication of the Scottish Parliament and the University of St Andrews arising from a project to create a comprehensive online database of the proceedings of the Parliament of Scotland from 1235 to the Act of Union. The website was launched in 2008.

The project was formulated by Professor Keith Brown of St Andrews University in 1996. Funding was quickly approved by then-Secretary of State for Scotland Michael Forsyth and announced by then-Prime Minister John Major on 4 July 1996. As well as the initial funding by the Scottish Office, monies for what became the Scottish Parliament Project were provided by the Scottish Government, the Arts and Humanities Research Board, and the Strathmartine Trust.

Under the general editorship of Professor Brown, the eleven-year project to complete the database created a work of around fifteen million words in size. It includes parallel translations from the original Latin, Norman French, and Scots.

The primary editors of the text of each period were:

- Alastair Mann (Early Modern)
- Gillian McIntosh (Early Modern)
- Pamela Ritchie (Early Modern)
- Roland Tanner (Medieval and Latin)

The lead website developer was Swithun Crowe.

== See also ==
- National Archives of Scotland
- Advocates' Library
