= Continuance of Acts Act 1553 =

Act of the Parliament of England

- Act of Parliament
- Parliament of England
- Long title: An Act for the Continuance of certain Statutes.
- Citation: 7 Edw. 6. c. 11
- Territorial extent: England and Wales

Dates
- Royal assent: 31 March 1553
- Commencement: 1 March 1553 (Note: Start of session.)
- Repealed: 28 July 1863

Other legislation
- Amends: See § Continued enactments
- Repealed by: Statute Law Revision Act 1863
- Relates to: Continuance of Laws Act 1536; Continuance of Laws (No. 2) Act 1536; Continuance of Laws (No. 3) Act 1536; Continuance of Laws Act 1539; Continuation of Laws Act 1541; Continuance of Laws Act 1545; Continuance of Laws Act 1551; Continuance of Laws Act 1553; Continuance of Laws Act 1554; Continuance of Laws (No. 2) Act 1554; Continuance of Laws Act 1555; Continuance of Laws Act 1557; Continuance of Laws Act 1558; See Expiring laws continuance acts

Status: Repealed

Text of statute as originally enacted

The Continuance of Acts Act 1553 (7 Edw. 6. c. 11) was an act of the Parliament of England that continued various older enactments.

== Background ==
In the United Kingdom, acts of Parliament remain in force until expressly repealed. Many acts of parliament, however, contained time-limited sunset clauses, requiring legislation to revive enactments that had expired or to continue enactments that would otherwise expire.

== Provisions ==
=== Continued enactments ===
Section 1 of the act continued the Exportation Act 1530 (22 Hen. 8. c. 7), the Manufacture of Cables, etc. Act 1529 (21 Hen. 8. c. 12), the Winding of Wool Act 1531 (23 Hen. 8. c. 17), the Killing Weanlings Act 1532 (24 Hen. 8. c. 9), and the Attaints Act 1531 (2 Hen. 8. c. 3), as continued by the Continuance of Laws Act 1536 (28 Hen. 8. c. 6), the Continuance of Laws (No. 2) Act 1536 (28 Hen. 8. c. 8) and the Continuance of Laws (No. 3) Act 1536 (28 Hen. 8. c. 9), and as continued by the Continuance of Laws Act 1539 (31 Hen. 8. c. 7), the Fish Act 1541 (33 Hen. 8. c. 2), the Wines Act 1542 (34 & 35 Hen. 8. c. 7) and the Preservation of Woods Act 1543 (35 Hen. 8. c. 17), as continued by the Continuance of Laws Act 1545 (37 Hen. 8. c. 23), the Unlawful Hunting Act 1549 (3 & 4 Edw. 6. c. 17), as continued by the Continuance of Laws Act 1551 (5 & 6 Edw. 6. c. 17), the Unlawful Hunting Act 1549 (3 & 4 Edw. 6. c. 17), which revived the Taking of Hawks Act 1539 (31 Hen. 8. c. 11) and the Stealing Hawks' Eggs Act 1540 (32 Hen. 8. c. 12), the Leather Act 1548 (2 & 3 Edw. 6. c. 9), the Malt Act 1548 (2 & 3 Edw. 6. c. 10), the Leather (No. 2) Act 1548 (2 & 3 Edw. 6. c. 11), the Riot Act 1549 (3 & 4 Edw. 6. c. 5), the Leather Act 1549 (3 & 4 Edw. 6. c. 6), the Prophecies Act 1549 (3 & 4 Edw. 6. c. 15), the Buying Cattle Act 1549 (3 & 4 Edw. 6. c. 19), the Butter and Cheese Act 1549 (3 & 4 Edw. 6. c. 21), the Poor Act 1551 (5 & 6 Edw. 6. c. 2) and the Forestallers Act 1551 (5 & 6 Edw. 6. c. 14) until the end of the next parliament.

Section 2 of the act provided that no person should lose their inheritance or property rights due to any offenses under the Taking of Hawks Act 1539 (31 Hen. 8. c. 11) and the Stealing Hawks' Eggs Act 1540 (32 Hen. 8. c. 12) related to hunting deer or rabbits, and that heirs and wives of such offenders should retain their inheritance rights as if no such conviction had occurred.

== Subsequent developments ==
The Select Committee on Temporary Laws, Expired or Expiring, appointed in 1796, inspected and considered all temporary laws, observing irregularities in the construction of expiring laws continuance acts, making recommendations and emphasising the importance of the Committee for Expired and Expiring Laws.

The whole act was repealed by section 1 of, and the schedule to, the Statute Law Revision Act 1863 (26 & 27 Vict. c. 125), which came into force on 28 July 1863.
