= Continuance of Laws Act 1557 =

Act of the Parliament of England

- Act of Parliament
- Parliament of England
- Long title: An Act for the Continuation of certain Statutes.
- Citation: 4 & 5 Ph. & M. c. 9
- Territorial extent: England and Wales

Dates
- Royal assent: 7 March 1558
- Commencement: 20 January 1558 (Note: Start of session.)
- Repealed: 28 July 1863

Other legislation
- Amends: See § Continued enactments
- Repealed by: Statute Law Revision Act 1863
- Relates to: Continuance of Laws Act 1536; Continuance of Laws (No. 2) Act 1536; Continuance of Laws (No. 3) Act 1536; Continuance of Laws Act 1539; Continuation of Laws Act 1541; Continuance of Laws Act 1545; Continuance of Laws Act 1551; Continuance of Acts Act 1553; Continuance of Laws Act 1553; Continuance of Laws Act 1554; Continuance of Laws (No. 2) Act 1554; Continuance of Laws Act 1555; Continuance of Laws Act 1558; See Expiring laws continuance acts

Status: Repealed

Text of statute as originally enacted

The Continuance of Laws Act 1557 (4 & 5 Ph. & M. c. 9) was an act of the Parliament of England that continued various older enactments.

== Background ==
In the United Kingdom, acts of Parliament remain in force until expressly repealed. Many acts of parliament, however, contained time-limited sunset clauses, requiring legislation to revive enactments that had expired or to continue enactments that would otherwise expire.

== Provisions ==
=== Continued enactments ===
Section 1 of the act continued the Exportation Act 1530 (22 Hen. 8. c. 7), the Winding of Wool Act 1531 (23 Hen. 8. c. 17), the Killing Weanlings Act 1532 (24 Hen. 8. c. 9), and the Attaints Act 1531 (2 Hen. 8. c. 3), as continued by the Continuance of Laws Act 1536 (28 Hen. 8. c. 6), the Continuance of Laws (No. 2) Act 1536 (28 Hen. 8. c. 8) and the Continuance of Laws (No. 3) Act 1536 (28 Hen. 8. c. 9), and as continued by the Continuance of Laws Act 1539 (31 Hen. 8. c. 7), the Preservation of Woods Act 1543 (35 Hen. 8. c. 17), as continued by the Continuance of Laws Act 1545 (37 Hen. 8. c. 23), the Leather Act 1548 (2 & 3 Edw. 6. c. 9), the Buying Cattle Act 1549 (3 & 4 Edw. 6. c. 19), the Butter and Cheese Act 1549 (3 & 4 Edw. 6. c. 21), the Forestallers Act 1551 (5 & 6 Edw. 6. c. 14), as continued by the Continuance of Acts Act 1553 (7 Edw. 6. c. 11) and the Continuance of Laws Act 1553 (1 Mar. Sess. 2. c. 13), and the Riot Act 1553 (1 Mar. Sess. 2. c. 12), as continued by the Continuance of Laws Act 1554 (1 Mar. Sess. 3. c. 12) and the Continuance of Laws (No. 2) Act 1554 (1 & 2 Ph. & M. c. 16), and the Seditious Words Act 1554 (1 & 2 Ph. & M. c. 16), as continued by the Continuance of Laws Act 1555 (2 & 3 Ph. & M. c. 21), and the Increase of Cattle Act 1555 (2 & 3 Ph. & M. c. 3) and the Tillage Act 1555 (2 & 3 Ph. & M. c. 2) until the end of the next parliament.

== Subsequent developments ==
The Select Committee on Temporary Laws, Expired or Expiring, appointed in 1796, inspected and considered all temporary laws, observing irregularities in the construction of expiring laws continuance acts, making recommendations and emphasising the importance of the Committee for Expired and Expiring Laws.

The whole act was repealed by section 1 of, and the schedule to, the Statute Law Revision Act 1863 (26 & 27 Vict. c. 125), which came into force on 28 July 1863.
