= Continuance of Laws Act 1545 =

Act of the Parliament of England

- Act of Parliament
- Parliament of England
- Long title: An Act for the Continuation of certain Statutes.
- Citation: 37 Hen. 8. c. 23
- Territorial extent: England and Wales

Dates
- Royal assent: 24 December 1545
- Commencement: 23 November 1545 (Note: Start of session.)
- Repealed: 28 July 1863

Other legislation
- Amends: See § Continued enactments
- Amended by: Continuance of Laws Act 1551
- Repealed by: Statute Law Revision Act 1863
- Relates to: Continuance of Laws Act 1536; Continuance of Laws (No. 2) Act 1536; Continuance of Laws (No. 3) Act 1536; Continuance of Laws Act 1539; Continuation of Laws Act 1541; Continuance of Laws Act 1551; Continuance of Acts Act 1553; Continuance of Laws Act 1553; Continuance of Laws Act 1554; Continuance of Laws (No. 2) Act 1554; Continuance of Laws Act 1555; Continuance of Laws Act 1557; Continuance of Laws Act 1558; See Expiring laws continuance acts

Status: Repealed

Text of statute as originally enacted

The Continuance of Laws Act 1545 (37 Hen. 8. c. 23) was an act of the Parliament of England that continued various older enactments.

== Background ==
In the United Kingdom, acts of Parliament remain in force until expressly repealed. Many acts of parliament, however, contained time-limited sunset clauses, requiring legislation to revive enactments that had expired or to continue enactments that would otherwise expire.

== Provisions ==
=== Continued enactments ===
Section 1 of the act continued the Vagabonds Act 1530 (22 Hen. 8. c. 12), the Exportation Act 1530 (22 Hen. 8. c. 7), the Manufacture of Cables, etc. Act 1529 (21 Hen. 8. c. 12), the Winding of Wool Act 1531 (23 Hen. 8. c. 17), the Killing Weanlings Act 1532 (24 Hen. 8. c. 9), the Attaints Act 1531 (23 Hen. 8. c. 3), the Flax and Hemp Act 1532 (24 Hen. 8. c. 4), the Gaols Act 1531 (23 Hen. 8. c. 2), as continued by the Continuance of Laws Act 1536 (28 Hen. 8. c. 6), the Continuance of Laws (No. 2) Act 1536 (28 Hen. 8. c. 8) and the Continuance of Laws (No. 3) Act 1536 (28 Hen. 8. c. 9), and as continued by the Continuance of Laws Act 1539 (31 Hen. 8. c. 7), and the Mispleadings, Jeofails, etc. Act 1540 (32 Hen. 8. c. 30), as continued by the Continuation of Laws Act 1541 (33 Hen. 8. c. 17), the Fish Act 1541 (33 Hen. 8. c. 2), the Worsted Yarn Act 1541 (33 Hen. 8. c. 16), the Wines Act 1542 (34 & 35 Hen. 8. c. 7) and the Sheriffs Act 1542 (34 & 35 Hen. 8. c. 16) until the end of the next parliament.

Section 2 of the act provided that the price of wines would be set under the Wines Act 1542 (34 & 35 Hen. 8. c. 7) between 21 November and 31 December every year, under the penalties provided in the Wines Act 1536 (28 Hen. 8. c. 14).

Section 3 of the act provided empowered chief officers of cities corporate to sell wines of those refusing to sell them in gross at the prices set in the Wines Act 1536 (28 Hen. 8. c. 14).

== Subsequent developments ==
The provisions of the act "concerninge the price of Wine or the sale of the same" were continued until the end of the next parliament by the Continuance of Laws Act 1551 (5 & 6 Edw. 6. c. 17).

The Select Committee on Temporary Laws, Expired or Expiring, appointed in 1796, inspected and considered all temporary laws, observing irregularities in the construction of expiring laws continuance acts, making recommendations and emphasising the importance of the Committee for Expired and Expiring Laws.

The whole act was repealed by section 1 of, and the schedule to, the Statute Law Revision Act 1863 (26 & 27 Vict. c. 125), which came into force on 28 July 1863.
