= Vagabonds Act 1530 =

Act of the Parliament of England

- Act of Parliament
- Parliament of England
- Long title: An Act directing how aged, poor, and impotent Persons, compelled to live by Alms, shall be ordered; and how Vagabonds and Beggars shall be punished.
- Citation: 22 Hen. 8. c. 12
- Territorial extent: England and Wales

Dates
- Royal assent: 31 March 1531
- Commencement: 24 June 1531 (Note: Section 1. The Feast of the Nativity of Saint John the Baptist.)
- Repealed: 29 May 1624
Other legislation
Amended by	Vagabonds Act 1535; Continuance of Laws Act 1536; Continuance of Laws Act 1539; Continuation of Laws Act 1541; Continuance of Laws Act 1545; Vagabonds Act 1547; Vagabonds Act 1549; Poor Act 1555; Poor Act 1562; Continuance, etc. of Laws Act 1592
Repealed by	Continuance, etc. of Laws Act 1623

Status: Repealed

Text of statute as originally enacted

The Vagabonds Act 1530 (22 Hen. 8. c. 12) was an act of the Parliament of England passed under Henry VIII and is a part of the Tudor Poor Laws of England. In full, it was entitled "An Act directing how aged, poor and impotent Persons, compelled to live by Alms, shall be ordered; and how Vagabonds and Beggars shall be punished."

Under this act, vagabonds were subject to the harsher punishment of whipping, rather than the stocks. However, it also created provisions for those who were unable to work due to sickness, age, or disability. These "impotent" beggars could become licensed to beg by their local Justices of the Peace. For this reason, this statute is recognised as the first English poor law to be at least partially aimed at providing relief, rather than punishing vagrancy, because it made the Justices of the Peace responsible for the licensed poor within their district.

== Subsequent developments ==
The act was continued until the end of the next parliament by section 1 of the Continuance of Laws Act 1536 (28 Hen. 8. c. 6).

The act was continued until the end of the next parliament by section 1 of the Continuance of Laws Act 1539 (31 Hen. 8. c. 7).

The act was continued until the end of the next parliament by section 1 of the Continuation of Laws Act 1541 (33 Hen. 8. c. 17).

The act was continued until the end of the next parliament by section 1 of the Continuance of Laws Act 1545 (37 Hen. 8. c. 23).

The act was repealed by section 1 of the Vagabonds Act 1547 (1 Edw. 6. c. 3), but was subsequently revived and made perpetual by section 1 of the Vagabonds Act 1549 (3 & 4 Edw. 6. c. 16).

The punishment of vagabonds by whipping was revived by section 7 of the Continuance, etc. of Laws Act 1592 (35 Eliz. 1. c. 7).

The whole act was repealed by section 11 of the Continuance, etc. of Laws Act 1623 (21 Jas. 1. c. 28).
