= Continuance of Laws (No. 3) Act 1536 =

Act of the Parliament of England

- Act of Parliament
- Parliament of England
- Long title: An Act for Continuance of the Statutes of Perjury; for making of Jayles; for Pewterers; and for sowing of Flax and Hemp.
- Citation: 28 Hen. 8. c. 9
- Territorial extent: England and Wales

Dates
- Royal assent: 18 July 1536
- Commencement: 8 June 1536 (Note: Start of session.)
- Repealed: 28 July 1863
Other legislation
Amends	See § Continued enactments
Repealed by	Statute Law Revision Act 1863
Relates to	Continuance of Laws Act 1536; Continuance of Laws (No. 2) Act 1536; Continuance of Laws Act 1539; Continuation of Laws Act 1541; Continuance of Laws Act 1545; Continuance of Laws Act 1551; Continuance of Acts Act 1553; Continuance of Laws Act 1553; Continuance of Laws Act 1554; Continuance of Laws (No. 2) Act 1554; Continuance of Laws Act 1555; Continuance of Laws Act 1557; Continuance of Laws Act 1558; See Expiring laws continuance acts

Status: Repealed

Text of statute as originally enacted

The Continuance of Laws (No. 3) Act 1536 (28 Hen. 8. c. 9) was an act of the Parliament of England that continued various older enactments.

== Background ==
In the United Kingdom, acts of Parliament remain in force until expressly repealed. Many acts of parliament, however, contained time-limited sunset clauses, requiring legislation to revive enactments that had expired or to continue enactments that would otherwise expire.

== Provisions ==
=== Continued enactments ===
Section 1 of the act continued the Attaints Act 1531 (23 Hen. 8. c. 3), the Gaols Act 1531 (23 Hen. 8. c. 2), the Pewterers Act 1533 (25 Hen. 8. c. 9) and the Flax and Hemp Act 1532 (24 Hen. 8. c. 4) until the end of the next parliament.

== Subsequent developments ==
The Select Committee on Temporary Laws, Expired or Expiring, appointed in 1796, inspected and considered all temporary laws, observing irregularities in the construction of expiring laws continuance acts, making recommendations and emphasising the importance of the Committee for Expired and Expiring Laws.

The whole act was repealed by section 1 of, and the schedule to, the Statute Law Revision Act 1863 (26 & 27 Vict. c. 125), which came into force on 28 July 1863.
