= Continuance of Laws Act 1536 =

Act of the Parliament of England

- Act of Parliament
- Parliament of England
- Long title: An Act made for continuing of the Statutes for Beggars and Vagabonds; and against Conveyance of Horses and Mares out of this Realm; against Welshmen making Affrays in the Counties of Hereford, Gloucester and Salop; and against the Vice of Buggery.
- Citation: 28 Hen. 8. c. 6
- Territorial extent: England and Wales

Dates
- Royal assent: 18 July 1536
- Commencement: 8 June 1536 (Note: Start of session.)
- Repealed: 28 July 1863
Other legislation
| Amends | See § Continued enactments |
| Repealed by | Statute Law Revision Act 1863 |
| Relates to | Continuance of Laws (No. 2) Act 1536; Continuance of Laws (No. 3) Act 1537; Continuance of Laws Act 1539; Continuation of Laws Act 1541; Continuance of Laws Act 1545; Continuance of Laws Act 1551; Continuance of Acts Act 1553; Continuance of Laws Act 1553; Continuance of Laws Act 1554; Continuance of Laws (No. 2) Act 1554; Continuance of Laws Act 1555; Continuance of Laws Act 1557; Continuance of Laws Act 1558; See Expiring laws continuance acts |

Status: Repealed

Text of statute as originally enacted

The Continuance of Laws Act 1536 (28 Hen. 8. c. 6) was an act of the Parliament of England that continued various older enactments.

== Background ==
In the United Kingdom, acts of Parliament remain in force until expressly repealed. Many acts of parliament, however, contained time-limited sunset clauses, requiring legislation to revive enactments that had expired or to continue enactments that would otherwise expire.

== Provisions ==
=== Continued enactments ===
Section 1 of the act continued the Vagabonds Act 1530 (22 Hen. 8. c. 12), the Exportation Act 1530 (22 Hen. 8. c. 7), the Assaults by Welshmen Act 1534 (26 Hen. 8. c. 11) and the Buggery Act 1533 (25 Hen. 8. c. 6) until the end of the next parliament.

== Subsequent developments ==
The Select Committee on Temporary Laws, Expired or Expiring, appointed in 1796, inspected and considered all temporary laws, observing irregularities in the construction of expiring laws continuance acts, making recommendations and emphasising the importance of the Committee for Expired and Expiring Laws.

The whole act was repealed by section 1 of, and the schedule to, the Statute Law Revision Act 1863 (26 & 27 Vict. c. 125), which came into force on 28 July 1863.
