= List of acts of the Parliament of England =

This is a list of acts of the Parliament of England, which was in existence from the 13th century until 1707.

- List of acts of the Parliament of England, 1225–1267
- List of acts of the Parliament of England, 1275–1307
- List of acts of the Parliament of England, 1308–1325
- Statutes of uncertain date
- List of acts of the Parliament of England, 1327–1376
- List of acts of the Parliament of England, 1377–1397
- List of acts of the Parliament of England, 1399–1411
- List of acts of the Parliament of England, 1413–1421
- List of acts of the Parliament of England, 1422–1460

- List of acts of the Parliament of England from 1461
- List of acts of the Parliament of England from 1463
- List of acts of the Parliament of England from 1464
- List of acts of the Parliament of England from 1467
- List of acts of the Parliament of England from 1468

- List of acts of the Parliament of England from 1472
- List of acts of the Parliament of England from 1474
- List of acts of the Parliament of England from 1477

- List of acts of the Parliament of England from 1482
- List of acts of the Parliament of England from 1483
- List of acts of the Parliament of England from 1485
- List of acts of the Parliament of England from 1487
- List of acts of the Parliament of England from 1488

- List of acts of the Parliament of England from 1491
- List of acts of the Parliament of England from 1495
- List of acts of the Parliament of England from 1496

- List of acts of the Parliament of England from 1503
- List of acts of the Parliament of England from 1509

- List of acts of the Parliament of England from 1511
- List of acts of the Parliament of England from 1512
- List of acts of the Parliament of England from 1513
- List of acts of the Parliament of England from 1514
- List of acts of the Parliament of England from 1515

- List of acts of the Parliament of England from 1523
- List of acts of the Parliament of England from 1529

- List of acts of the Parliament of England from 1530
- List of acts of the Parliament of England from 1531
- List of acts of the Parliament of England from 1532
- List of acts of the Parliament of England from 1533
- List of acts of the Parliament of England from 1534
- List of acts of the Parliament of England from 1535
- List of acts of the Parliament of England from 1536
- List of acts of the Parliament of England from 1539

- List of acts of the Parliament of England from 1540
- List of acts of the Parliament of England from 1541
- List of acts of the Parliament of England from 1542
- List of acts of the Parliament of England from 1543
- List of acts of the Parliament of England from 1545
- List of acts of the Parliament of England from 1546
- List of acts of the Parliament of England from 1547
- List of acts of the Parliament of England from 1548
- List of acts of the Parliament of England from 1549

- List of acts of the Parliament of England from 1551
- List of acts of the Parliament of England from 1553
- List of acts of the Parliament of England from 1554
- List of acts of the Parliament of England from 1555
- List of acts of the Parliament of England from 1557
- List of acts of the Parliament of England from 1558

- List of acts of the Parliament of England from 1562
- List of acts of the Parliament of England from 1566

- List of acts of the Parliament of England from 1571
- List of acts of the Parliament of England from 1572
- List of acts of the Parliament of England from 1575

- List of acts of the Parliament of England from 1580
- List of acts of the Parliament of England from 1584
- List of acts of the Parliament of England from 1586
- List of acts of the Parliament of England from 1588

- List of acts of the Parliament of England from 1592
- List of acts of the Parliament of England from 1597

- List of acts of the Parliament of England from 1601
- List of acts of the Parliament of England from 1603
- List of acts of the Parliament of England from 1605
- List of acts of the Parliament of England from 1606
- List of acts of the Parliament of England from 1609

- List of acts of the Parliament of England from 1620
- List of acts of the Parliament of England from 1623
- List of acts of the Parliament of England from 1625
- List of acts of the Parliament of England from 1627

- List of acts of the Parliament of England from 1640

- List of ordinances and acts of the Parliament of England, 1642–1660

- List of acts of the Parliament of England from 1660
- List of acts of the Parliament of England from 1661
- List of acts of the Parliament of England from 1662
- List of acts of the Parliament of England from 1663
- List of acts of the Parliament of England from 1664
- List of acts of the Parliament of England from 1665
- List of acts of the Parliament of England from 1666
- List of acts of the Parliament of England from 1667

- List of acts of the Parliament of England from 1670
- List of acts of the Parliament of England from 1672
- List of acts of the Parliament of England from 1675
- List of acts of the Parliament of England from 1677
- List of acts of the Parliament of England from 1678
- List of acts of the Parliament of England from 1679

- List of acts of the Parliament of England from 1680
- List of acts of the Parliament of England from 1685
- List of acts of the Parliament of England from 1688
- List of acts of the Parliament of England from 1689

- List of acts of the Parliament of England from 1690
- List of acts of the Parliament of England from 1691
- List of acts of the Parliament of England from 1692
- List of acts of the Parliament of England from 1693
- List of acts of the Parliament of England from 1694
- List of acts of the Parliament of England from 1695
- List of acts of the Parliament of England from 1696
- List of acts of the Parliament of England from 1697
- List of acts of the Parliament of England from 1698

- List of acts of the Parliament of England from 1700
- List of acts of the Parliament of England from 1701
- List of acts of the Parliament of England from 1702
- List of acts of the Parliament of England from 1703
- List of acts of the Parliament of England from 1704
- List of acts of the Parliament of England from 1705
- List of acts of the Parliament of England from 1706

== See also ==
For acts passed during the period 1707–1800, see the list of acts of the Parliament of Great Britain. See also the list of acts of the Parliament of Scotland and the list of acts of the Parliament of Ireland.

For acts passed from 1801 onwards, see the list of acts of the Parliament of the United Kingdom. For acts of the devolved parliaments and assemblies in the United Kingdom, see the list of acts of the Scottish Parliament from 1999, the list of acts of the Northern Ireland Assembly, and the list of acts and measures of Senedd Cymru; see also the list of acts of the Parliament of Northern Ireland.

For medieval statutes, etc. that are not considered to be acts of Parliament, see the list of English statutes. For statutes passed during the Commonwealth, see the list of ordinances and acts of the Parliament of England, 1642–1660.
