= List of acts of the Parliament of England from 1529 =

This is a list of acts of the Parliament of England for the year 1529.

For acts passed during the period 1707–1800, see the list of acts of the Parliament of Great Britain. See also the list of acts of the Parliament of Scotland, and the list of acts of the Parliament of Ireland.

For acts passed from 1801 onwards, see the list of acts of the Parliament of the United Kingdom. For acts of the devolved parliaments and assemblies in the United Kingdom, see the list of acts of the Scottish Parliament, the list of acts of the Northern Ireland Assembly, and the list of acts and measures of Senedd Cymru; see also the list of acts of the Parliament of Northern Ireland.

For medieval statutes, etc. that are not considered to be acts of Parliament, see the list of English statutes.

See also the List of ordinances and acts of the Parliament of England, 1642–1660 for ordinances and acts passed by the Long Parliament and other bodies without royal assent, and which were not considered to be valid legislation following the Restoration in 1660.

The number shown after each act's title is its chapter number. Acts are cited using this number, preceded by the years of the reign during which the relevant parliamentary session was held; thus the Union with Ireland Act 1800 is cited as "39 & 40 Geo. 3. c. 67", meaning the 67th act passed during the session that started in the 39th year of the reign of George III and which finished in the 40th year of that reign. The modern convention is to use Arabic numerals in citations (thus "41 Geo. 3" rather than "41 Geo. III"). Acts of the last session of the Parliament of Great Britain and the first session of the Parliament of the United Kingdom are both cited as "41 Geo. 3".

Acts passed by the Parliament of England did not have a short title; however, some of these acts have subsequently been given a short title by acts of the Parliament of the United Kingdom, such as the Short Titles Act 1896 (59 & 60 Vict. c. 14).

Acts passed by the Parliament of England were deemed to have come into effect on the first day of the session in which they were passed. Because of this, the years given in the list below may in fact be the year before a particular act was passed.

== 21 Hen. 8 ==
The first session of the 5th Parliament of King Henry VIII (the Reformation Parliament), which met from 3 November 1529 until 17 December 1529.

This session was also traditionally cited as 21 H. 8.

Note that cc. 22–26 were traditionally cited as private acts cc. 1–5.

Short title	Citation	Royal assent
Long title
Act of General Pardon 1529 (repealed)	21 Hen. 8. c. 1	17 December 1529
The King's Highness his general Pardon. (Repealed by Statute Law Revision Act 1863 (26 & 27 Vict. c. 125))
Sanctuary Act 1529 (repealed)	21 Hen. 8. c. 2	17 December 1529
An Act concerning such as shall take Sanctuary for Felony or Murder. (Repealed by Statute Law Revision Act 1863 (26 & 27 Vict. c. 125))
Real Actions Act 1529 (repealed)	21 Hen. 8. c. 3	17 December 1529
An Act concerning Delays in Assizes. (Repealed by Statute Law Revision Act 1863 (26 & 27 Vict. c. 125))
Executors Act 1529 (repealed)	21 Hen. 8. c. 4	17 December 1529
An Act concerning Executors of last Wills and Testaments. (Repealed by Administration of Estates Act 1925 (15 & 16 Geo. 5. c. 23))
Probate Fees, Inventories, etc. Act 1529 (repealed)	21 Hen. 8. c. 5	17 December 1529
An Act concerning Fines and Sums of Money to be taken by the Ministers of Bishops and other Ordinaries of Holy Church for the Probate of Testaments. (Repealed by Administration of Estates Act 1925 (15 & 16 Geo. 5. c. 23))
Mortuaries Act 1529 (repealed)	21 Hen. 8. c. 6	17 December 1529
An Act concerning the taking of Mortuaries, (Note: A mortuary in this sense is a gift to a priest from a deceased parishioner. The dictionary definition of mortuary at Wiktionary.) or demanding, receiving or claiming of the same. (Repealed by Ecclesiastical Jurisdiction Measure 1963 (No. 1))
Embezzlement Act 1529 (repealed)	21 Hen. 8. c. 7	17 December 1529
An Act for the Punishment of such Servants as shall withdraw themselves, and go away with their Masters' or Mistresses' Caskets and other Jewels or Goods, committed to them in Trust to be kept. (Repealed for England and Wales by Criminal Statutes Repeal Act 1827 (7 & 8 Geo. 4. c. 27) and for India by Criminal Law (India) Act 1828 (9 Geo. 4. c. 74))
Killing Calves Act 1529 (repealed)	21 Hen. 8. c. 8	17 December 1529
An Act for the bringing up and rearing of Calves to increase the Multitude of Cattle. (Repealed by Statute Law Revision Act 1863 (26 & 27 Vict. c. 125))
Prices of Foreign Hats, etc. Act 1529 (repealed)	21 Hen. 8. c. 9	17 December 1529
An Act limiting the Prices of Woollen Hats, Bonnets, and Caps made beyond the Seas, and brought to be sold within this Realm. (Repealed by Continuance, etc. of Laws Act 1603 (1 Jas. 1. c. 25), confirmed by Repeal of Acts Concerning Importation Act 1822 (3 Geo. 4. c. 41))
Exportation Act 1529 (repealed)	21 Hen. 8. c. 10	17 December 1529
An Act against the carrying of Lattin, Brass and such Metal mixed beyond the Seas. (Repealed by Repeal of Acts Concerning Importation Act 1822 (3 Geo. 4. c. 41))
Restitution of Goods Stolen Act 1529 (repealed)	21 Hen. 8. c. 11	17 December 1529
An Act for Restitution to be made of the Goods of such as shall be robbed by Felons. (Repealed for England and Wales by Criminal Statutes Repeal Act 1827 (7 & 8 Geo. 4. c. 27) and for India by Criminal Law (India) Act 1828 (9 Geo. 4. c. 74))
Manufacture of Cables, etc. Act 1529 (repealed)	21 Hen. 8. c. 12	17 December 1529
An Act for the making of great Cables and Halsers, Ropes and all other Tackling for Ships, in the Borough of Burport, in the County of Dorset. (Repealed by Repeal of Obsolete Statutes Act 1856 (19 & 20 Vict. c. 64))
Clergy Act 1529 (repealed)	21 Hen. 8. c. 13	17 December 1529
An Act that no Spiritual Persons shall take to farm, of the King or any other Person, any Lands or Tenements for Term of Life, Lives, Years or at Will, &c.; and for Pluralities of Benefices; and for Residence. (Repealed by Pluralities Act 1838 (1 & 2 Vict. c. 106))
Importation Act 1529 (repealed)	21 Hen. 8. c. 14	17 December 1529
An Act for the Linen Drapers in London. (Repealed by Cloths Act 1536 (28 Hen. 8. c. 4), confirmed by Repeal of Acts Concerning Importation Act 1822 (3 Geo. 4. c. 41))
Recoveries Act 1529 (repealed)	21 Hen. 8. c. 15	17 December 1529
An Act that Tenants for Term of Years may falsify for their Term only, Recoveries had and made by their Lessors, to the defrauding of the said Termers' Interests. (Repealed by Statute Law Revision Act 1863 (26 & 27 Vict. c. 125))
Aliens Act 1529 (repealed)	21 Hen. 8. c. 16	17 December 1529
An Act ratifying a Decree made in the Star Chamber, concerning Strangers and Handycraftsmen inhabiting the Realm of England. (Repealed by Repeal of Obsolete Statutes Act 1856 (19 & 20 Vict. c. 64))
Repeal of Grant to York Act 1529 (repealed)	21 Hen. 8. c. 17	17 December 1529
An Act repealing a Grant lately made by the King's Highness to the Citizens of York, for the shipping of certain Wools into the Port of Hull. (Repealed by Statute Law Revision Act 1948 (11 & 12 Geo. 6. c. 62))
Trade to Tyne Act 1529 (repealed)	21 Hen. 8. c. 18	17 December 1529
An Act for the Town of Newcastle upon Tyne, concerning the shipping of Merchandize, and the unshipping thereof within, the Liberties of the said Town. (Repealed by River Tyne Improvement Act 1850 (13 & 14 Vict. c. lxiii))
Avowries Act 1529 (repealed)	21 Hen. 8. c. 19	17 December 1529
An Act concerning Avowries. (Repealed by Statute Law Revision and Civil Procedure Act 1883 (46 & 47 Vict. c. 49))
President of the Council Act 1529 (repealed)	21 Hen. 8. c. 20	17 December 1529
An Act that the President of the King's Counsel shall be associate with the Chancellor and Treasurer of England, and the Keeper of the King's Privy Seal. (Repealed by Statute Law Revision Act 1863 (26 & 27 Vict. c. 125), Statute Law Revision Act 1888 (51 & 52 Vict. c. 3) and Statute Law Revision Act 1948 (11 & 12 Geo. 6. c. 62))
Yarmouth Worsteds Act 1529 (repealed)	21 Hen. 8. c. 21	17 December 1529
An Act for Yarmouth concerning the making of Worsteds. (Repealed by Statute Law Revision Act 1863 (26 & 27 Vict. c. 125))
Assurance to Duke of Norfolk Act 1529 (repealed)	21 Hen. 8. c. 22 (Note: This is the citation in The Statutes of the Realm.); 21 Hen. 8. c. 1 Pr. (Note: This is the citation in The Statutes at Large.)	17 December 1529
An Act for the assurance of divers manors and lands to Thomas duke of Norfolk, and the heirs male of his body. (Repealed by Statute Law (Repeals) Act 1978 (c. 45))
Will of John Rooper of Canterbury Act 1529	21 Hen. 8. c. 23; 21 Hen. 8. c. 2 Pr.	17 December 1529
An Act concerning the last will and testament of John Roper the elder, of Canterbury, in the county of Kent.
Release of Loans, etc. Act 1529 (repealed)	21 Hen. 8. c. 24; 21 Hen. 8. c. 3 Pr.	17 December 1529
An Act for the releasing unto the King such sums of money as he was to pay to his subjects for any manner of loan by letters missive, or otherwise. (Repealed by Statute Law Revision Act 1863 (26 & 27 Vict. c. 125))
Wolsey Attainder Act 1529 (repealed)	21 Hen. 8. c. 25; 21 Hen. 8. c. 4 Pr.	17 December 1529
An Act that no person shall sustain any prejudice by means of the attainder of Thomas lord cardinal, who was seized of divers lands to divers uses. (Repealed by Statute Law Revision Act 1948 (11 & 12 Geo. 6. c. 62))
Assurance to Duchess of Norfolk Act 1529 (repealed)	21 Hen. 8. c. 26; 21 Hen. 8. c. 5 Pr.	17 December 1529
An Act for the assurance of certain lands to Elizabeth duchess of Norfolk during her life, and after to the duke of Norfolk and his heirs. (Repealed by Statute Law (Repeals) Act 1978 (c. 45))

=== Sources ===
- "21° Hen. VIII". The Statutes of the Realm. Vol. 3: 1509 to 1547. pp. 282–317 – via HathiTrust.
- "21° Hen. VIII". The Statutes of the Realm. Vol. 3: 1509 to 1547. pp. 282–317 – via Google Books.
- "Anno vicesimo primo Henrici VIII". The Statutes at Large. Vol. 4 - 1 Richard III to 31 Henry VIII - 1483-4 to 1539. pp. 165–197 – via Internet Archive.
- "Anno vicesimo primo Henrici VIII". The Statutes at Large. Vol. 4 - 1 Richard III to 31 Henry VIII - 1483-4 to 1539. pp. 165–197 – via Internet Archive.
- "Anno vicesimo primo Henrici VIII". The Statutes at Large. Vol. 4 - 1 Richard III to 31 Henry VIII - 1483-4 to 1539. pp. 165–197 – via Internet Archive.
- Journal of the House of Lords. Vol. 1: 1509-1577. London: His Majesty's Stationery Office. 1830 – via British History Online.
- Chronological Table of and Index to the Statutes. Vol. 1: To the End of the Session 59 Vict. Sess. 2 (1895) (13th ed.). London: Her Majesty's Stationery Office. 1896. pp. 45–46 – via Google Books.
- Chronological Table of the Statutes: Covering the Period from 1235 to the End of 1971. London: Her Majesty's Stationery Office. 1972. p. 41. ISBN 978-0-11-840096-1 – via Google Books.

== See also ==
- List of acts of the Parliament of England
