= List of acts of the Parliament of England from 1549 =

This is a list of acts of the Parliament of England for the year 1549.

For acts passed during the period 1707–1800, see the list of acts of the Parliament of Great Britain. See also the list of acts of the Parliament of Scotland, and the list of acts of the Parliament of Ireland.

For acts passed from 1801 onwards, see the list of acts of the Parliament of the United Kingdom. For acts of the devolved parliaments and assemblies in the United Kingdom, see the list of acts of the Scottish Parliament, the list of acts of the Northern Ireland Assembly, and the list of acts and measures of Senedd Cymru; see also the list of acts of the Parliament of Northern Ireland.

For medieval statutes, etc. that are not considered to be acts of Parliament, see the list of English statutes.

See also the List of ordinances and acts of the Parliament of England, 1642–1660 for ordinances and acts passed by the Long Parliament and other bodies without royal assent, and which were not considered to be valid legislation following the Restoration in 1660.

The number shown after each act's title is its chapter number. Acts are cited using this number, preceded by the years of the reign during which the relevant parliamentary session was held; thus the Union with Ireland Act 1800 is cited as "39 & 40 Geo. 3. c. 67", meaning the 67th act passed during the session that started in the 39th year of the reign of George III and which finished in the 40th year of that reign. The modern convention is to use Arabic numerals in citations (thus "41 Geo. 3" rather than "41 Geo. III"). Acts of the last session of the Parliament of Great Britain and the first session of the Parliament of the United Kingdom are both cited as "41 Geo. 3".

Acts passed by the Parliament of England did not have a short title; however, some of these acts have subsequently been given a short title by acts of the Parliament of the United Kingdom, such as the Short Titles Act 1896 (59 & 60 Vict. c. 14).

Acts passed by the Parliament of England were deemed to have come into effect on the first day of the session in which they were passed. Because of this, the years given in the list below may in fact be the year before a particular act was passed.

== 3 & 4 Edw. 6 ==
The third session of the 1st Parliament of King Edward VI, which met from 4 November 1549 until 1 February 1550.

This session was also traditionally cited as 3 & 4 Ed. 6.

=== Public acts ===
| Short title | Citation | Royal assent |
Long title
| Custos Rotulorum Act 1549 (repealed) | 3 & 4 Edw. 6. c. 1 | 1 February 1550 |
An Act, That the Lord Chancellor, or Lord Keeper of the Great Seal, for the Time being, shall name and appoint the Custos Rotulorum throughout all Shires of England, according as in Time past hath been accustomed. (Repealed by Statute Law Revision Act 1863 (26 & 27 Vict. c. 125))
| Woollen Cloths Act 1549 (repealed) | 3 & 4 Edw. 6. c. 2 | 1 February 1550 |
An Act for the true making of Woollen Cloths. (Repealed by Repeal of Obsolete Statutes Act 1856 (19 & 20 Vict. c. 64))
| Improvement of Commons Act 1549 (repealed) | 3 & 4 Edw. 6. c. 3 | 1 February 1550 |
An Act concerning the Improvement of Commons and Waste Grounds. (Repealed by Civil Procedure Acts Repeal Act 1879 (42 & 43 Vict. c. 59))
| Crown Lands Act 1549 (repealed) | 3 & 4 Edw. 6. c. 4 | 1 February 1550 |
An Act concerning Gifts and Grants made by Patentees out of Letters Patents. (Repealed by Statute Law Revision Act 1948 (11 & 12 Geo. 6. c. 62))
| Riot Act 1549 (repealed) | 3 & 4 Edw. 6. c. 5 | 1 February 1550 |
An Act for the Punishment of unlawful Assemblies, and rising of the King's Subjects. (Repealed by Riot Act 1553 (1 Mar. Sess. 2. c. 12))
| Leather Act 1549 (repealed) | 3 & 4 Edw. 6. c. 6 | 1 February 1550 |
An Act concerning the Repeal of a Branch in the Act of Parliament made for buying of Tanned Leather. (Note: Leather Act 1548 (2 & 3 Edw. 6. c. 9)) (Repealed by Statute Law Revision Act 1863 (26 & 27 Vict. c. 125))
| Wild Fowl Act 1549 (repealed) | 3 & 4 Edw. 6. c. 7 | 1 February 1550 |
An Act for the Repeal of a Statute made in the 25th Year of King Henry the Eighth, touching the taking of Wild Fowl at certain Times of the Year. (Repealed by Statute Law Revision Act 1863 (26 & 27 Vict. c. 125))
| Continuance of Statute of Sewers Act 1549 (repealed) | 3 & 4 Edw. 6. c. 8 | 1 February 1550 |
An Act for the Continuance of the Statute of Sewers. (Note: Statute of Sewers (23 Hen. 8. c. 5)) (Repealed by Land Drainage Act 1930 (20 & 21 Geo. 5. c. 44))
| Buying of Hides Act 1549 (repealed) | 3 & 4 Edw. 6. c. 9 | 1 February 1550 |
An Act for buying of Raw Hides and Calfskins. (Repealed by Repeal of Obsolete Statutes Act 1856 (19 & 20 Vict. c. 64))
| Putting away of Books and Images Act 1549 (repealed) | 3 & 4 Edw. 6. c. 10 | 1 February 1550 |
An Act for the abolishing and putting away of divers Books and Images. (Repealed by Roman Catholic Relief Act 1926 (16 & 17 Geo. 5. c. 55))
| Canon Law Act 1549 (repealed) | 3 & 4 Edw. 6. c. 11 | 1 February 1550 |
An Act, That the King's Majesty may nominate and appoint Thirty-two Persons, to peruse and make Ecclesiastical Laws. (Repealed by Statute Law Revision Act 1863 (26 & 27 Vict. c. 125))
| Consecration of Bishops, etc. Act 1549 (repealed) | 3 & 4 Edw. 6. c. 12 | 1 February 1550 |
An Act for the ordering of Ecclesiastical Ministers. (Repealed by Statute Law Revision Act 1863 (26 & 27 Vict. c. 125))
| Restitution of Sir William Sherington Act 1549 (repealed) | 3 & 4 Edw. 6. c. 13 | 1 February 1550 |
An Act for the Restitution in Blood of Sir William Sharington, Knight. (Repealed by Statute Law Revision Act 1948 (11 & 12 Geo. 6. c. 62))
| Restitution of Mary Seymour Act 1549 (repealed) | 3 & 4 Edw. 6. c. 14 | 1 February 1550 |
An Act of the Restitution of Mary Seymour dawghter of the Lorde Seymour late Admirall of Englond. (Repealed by Statute Law (Repeals) Act 1977 (c. 18))
| Prophecies Act 1549 (repealed) | 3 & 4 Edw. 6. c. 15 | 1 February 1550 |
An Act against fond and fantastical Prophecies. (Repealed by Statute Law Revision Act 1863 (26 & 27 Vict. c. 125))
| Vagabonds Act 1549 (repealed) | 3 & 4 Edw. 6. c. 16 | 1 February 1550 |
An Act touching the Punishment of Vagabonds, and other idle Persons. (Repealed by Continuance, etc. of Laws Act 1623 (21 Jas. 1. c. 28))
| Unlawful Hunting Act 1549 (repealed) | 3 & 4 Edw. 6. c. 17 | 1 February 1550 |
An Act against unlawful Hunting in any Park, Forest, Chace, or other enclosed Ground. (Repealed by Statute Law Revision Act 1863 (26 & 27 Vict. c. 125))
| Certain Fee-farm Rents Act 1549 (repealed) | 3 & 4 Edw. 6. c. 18 | 1 February 1550 |
An Act concerning Fee Farms mentioned in the last Session. (Repealed by Statute Law Revision Act 1863 (26 & 27 Vict. c. 125))
| Buying Cattle Act 1549 (repealed) | 3 & 4 Edw. 6. c. 19 | 1 February 1550 |
An Act for the buying and selling of Rother Beasts and Cattle (Repealed by Forestalling, Regrating, etc. Act 1844 (7 & 8 Vict. c. 24))
| Victuallers, etc. Act 1549 (repealed) | 3 & 4 Edw. 6. c. 20 | 1 February 1550 |
An Act touching the Repeal of a certain Branch of an Act passed in the last Session of this Parliament, (Note: Victuallers, etc. Act 1548 (2 & 3 Edw. 6. c. 15)) concerning Victuallers and Artificers. (Repealed by Statute Law Revision Act 1863 (26 & 27 Vict. c. 125))
| Butter and Cheese Act 1549 (repealed) | 3 & 4 Edw. 6. c. 21 | 1 February 1550 |
An Act concerning buying and selling of Butter and Cheese. (Repealed for England and Wales by Repeal of Certain Laws Act 1772 (12 Geo. 3. c. 71) and for Ireland by Forestalling, Regrating, etc. Act 1844 (7 & 8 Vict. c. 24))
| Journeymen Act 1549 (repealed) | 3 & 4 Edw. 6. c. 22 | 1 February 1550 |
An Act touching the retaining of Journeymen by divers Persons. (Repealed by Statute Law Revision Act 1863 (26 & 27 Vict. c. 125))
| Taxation Act 1549 (repealed) | 3 & 4 Edw. 6. c. 23 | 1 February 1550 |
An Act concerning the Release of the Branches in the last Act of Relief for the Payments of Sheep and Cloths, and also a Grant of a Subsidy to be paid in one Year. (Repealed by Statute Law Revision Act 1863 (26 & 27 Vict. c. 125))
| Act of General Pardon 1549 (repealed) | 3 & 4 Edw. 6. c. 24 | 1 February 1550 |
An Act of the King's Majesty's most Free and General Pardon. (Repealed by Statute Law Revision Act 1863 (26 & 27 Vict. c. 125))

=== Private acts ===
| Short title | Citation | Royal assent |
Long title
| Creation of a churchyard at West Drayton. | 3 & 4 Edw. 6. c. 1 Pr. | 1 February 1550 |
An Act for the appointing of a Church-yard at West-Drayton.
| River Dee weirs (Chester). | 3 & 4 Edw. 6. c. 2 Pr. | 1 February 1550 |
An Act concerning the City of Chestre, for Wears in the River of Dee.
| Wells Church dividends and quotidians. | 3 & 4 Edw. 6. c. 3 Pr. | 1 February 1550 |
An Act concerning Dividends and Quotidians in the Church of Welles.
| Disinheriting William West. | 3 & 4 Edw. 6. c. 4 Pr. | 1 February 1550 |
An Act for the disinheriting of William West, during his Life only.
| Restitution in blood of Thomas Isleye. | 3 & 4 Edw. 6. c. 5 Pr. | 1 February 1550 |
An Act for the Restitution in Blood of Thomas Isleye.
| Restitution in blood of Sir William Hussey. | 3 & 4 Edw. 6. c. 6 Pr. | 1 February 1550 |
An Act for the Restitution in Blood of Sir William Hussey, Knight.
| Duke of Somerset's fine and ransom. | 3 & 4 Edw. 6. c. 7 Pr. | 1 February 1550 |
An Act touching the Fine and Ransom of the Duke of Somersett.

=== Sources ===
- "3° & 4° Edw. VI". The Statutes of the Realm. Vol. 4 Part 1: 1547 to 1584. pp. 99–128 – via Internet Archive.
- "3° & 4° Edw. VI". The Statutes of the Realm. Vol. 4 Part 1: 1547 to 1584. pp. 99–128 – via HathiTrust.
- "3° & 4° Edw. VI". The Statutes of the Realm. Vol. 4 Part 1: 1547 to 1584. pp. 99–128 – via Google Books.
- "Anno tertio & quarto Edw. VI". The Statutes at Large. Vol. 5 – 32 Henry VIII to 7 Edward VI – 1540 to 1552–3. pp. 330–348 – via Internet Archive.
- Journal of the House of Commons. Vol. 1 – 1547-1629. His Majesty's Stationery Office. 1802 – via British History Online.
- Journal of the House of Lords. Vol. 1: 1509-1577. London: His Majesty's Stationery Office. 1830 – via British History Online.
- Chronological Table of and Index to the Statutes. Vol. 1: To the End of the Session 59 Vict. Sess. 2 (1895) (13th ed.). London: Her Majesty's Stationery Office. 1896. pp. 55–56 – via Google Books.
- Chronological Table of the Statutes: Covering the Period from 1235 to the End of 1971. London: Her Majesty's Stationery Office. 1972. p. 53. ISBN 978-0-11-840096-1 – via Google Books.
- "Chronological Tables of the Private and Personal Acts: Part 1 (1539–1601)". legislation.gov.uk. The National Archives.

== See also ==
- List of acts of the Parliament of England
