= List of acts of the Parliament of England from 1548 =

This is a list of acts of the Parliament of England for the year 1548.

For acts passed during the period 1707–1800, see the list of acts of the Parliament of Great Britain. See also the list of acts of the Parliament of Scotland, and the list of acts of the Parliament of Ireland.

For acts passed from 1801 onwards, see the list of acts of the Parliament of the United Kingdom. For acts of the devolved parliaments and assemblies in the United Kingdom, see the list of acts of the Scottish Parliament, the list of acts of the Northern Ireland Assembly, and the list of acts and measures of Senedd Cymru; see also the list of acts of the Parliament of Northern Ireland.

For medieval statutes, etc. that are not considered to be acts of Parliament, see the list of English statutes.

See also the List of ordinances and acts of the Parliament of England, 1642–1660 for ordinances and acts passed by the Long Parliament and other bodies without royal assent, and which were not considered to be valid legislation following the Restoration in 1660.

The number shown after each act's title is its chapter number. Acts are cited using this number, preceded by the years of the reign during which the relevant parliamentary session was held; thus the Union with Ireland Act 1800 is cited as "39 & 40 Geo. 3. c. 67", meaning the 67th act passed during the session that started in the 39th year of the reign of George III and which finished in the 40th year of that reign. The modern convention is to use Arabic numerals in citations (thus "41 Geo. 3" rather than "41 Geo. III"). Acts of the last session of the Parliament of Great Britain and the first session of the Parliament of the United Kingdom are both cited as "41 Geo. 3".

Acts passed by the Parliament of England did not have a short title; however, some of these acts have subsequently been given a short title by acts of the Parliament of the United Kingdom, such as the Short Titles Act 1896 (59 & 60 Vict. c. 14).

Acts passed by the Parliament of England were deemed to have come into effect on the first day of the session in which they were passed. Because of this, the years given in the list below may in fact be the year before a particular act was passed.

== 2 & 3 Edw. 6 ==
The second session of the 1st Parliament of King Edward VI, which met from 24 November 1548 until 14 March 1549.

This session was also traditionally cited as 2 & 3 Ed. 6.

=== Public acts ===
Short title	Citation	Royal assent
Long title
Act of Uniformity 1548 or the Act of Uniformity 1549 or the Uniformity Act 1548 or the Act of Equality (repealed)	2 & 3 Edw. 6. c. 1	14 March 1549
An Act for the Uniformity of Service, and the Administration of the Sacraments, throughout the Realm. (Repealed for Northern Ireland by Statute Law Revision Act 1950 (14 Geo. 6. c. 6) and for England and Wales by Church of England (Worship and Doctrine) Measure 1974 (No. 3))
Soldiers Act 1548 (repealed)	2 & 3 Edw. 6. c. 2	14 March 1549
An Act touching the true Service required in Captains and Soldiers. (Repealed by Statute Law Revision Act 1863 (26 & 27 Vict. c. 125))
Purveyors Act 1548 (repealed)	2 & 3 Edw. 6. c. 3	14 March 1549
An Act touching Purveyors. (Repealed by Statute Law Revision Act 1863 (26 & 27 Vict. c. 125))
Sheriffs Act 1548 (repealed)	2 & 3 Edw. 6. c. 4	14 March 1549
An Act for the Sheriffs to have certain Allowances upon their Accompts. (Repealed by Statute Law Revision Act 1863 (26 & 27 Vict. c. 125))
Certain Fee-farms Act 1548 (repealed)	2 & 3 Edw. 6. c. 5	14 March 1549
An Act touching the remitting of Fee Farms for Three Years. (Repealed by Statute Law Revision Act 1863 (26 & 27 Vict. c. 125))
Traffic with Iceland, etc. Act 1548 (repealed)	2 & 3 Edw. 6. c. 6	14 March 1549
An Act against the Exaction of Money, or other Thing, by any Officer, for Licence to traffick into Iselande. (Repealed by Statute Law Revision Act 1863 (26 & 27 Vict. c. 125))
Religious Houses Act 1548 (repealed)	2 & 3 Edw. 6. c. 7	14 March 1549
An Act against the crafty and deceitful buying of Pensions. (Repealed by Statute Law Revision Act 1948 (11 & 12 Geo. 6. c. 62))
Inquisitions of Escheator Act 1548 (repealed)	2 & 3 Edw. 6. c. 8	14 March 1549
An Act touching the finding of Offices before the Escheators. (Repealed by Escheat (Procedure) Act 1887 (50 & 51 Vict. c. 53))
Leather Act 1548 (repealed)	2 & 3 Edw. 6. c. 9	14 March 1549
An Act for the true currying of Leather. (Repealed by Repeal of Obsolete Statutes Act 1856 (19 & 20 Vict. c. 64))
Malt Act 1548 (repealed)	2 & 3 Edw. 6. c. 10	14 March 1549
An Act for the true making of Malt. (Repealed by Statute Law Revision Act 1863 (26 & 27 Vict. c. 125))
Leather (No. 2) Act 1548 (repealed)	2 & 3 Edw. 6. c. 11	14 March 1549
An Act for the true tanning of Leather. (Repealed by Repeal of Obsolete Statutes Act 1856 (19 & 20 Vict. c. 64))
Assurance of Lands of Duke of Somerset Act 1548 (repealed)	2 & 3 Edw. 6. c. 12	14 March 1549
An Act for the Assurance to the Tenants of Grants and Leases made of the Duke of Somersett's Demesne Lands. (Repealed by Statute Law (Repeals) Act 1978 (c. 45))
Easter Offerings and Tithes Act 1548 (repealed)	2 & 3 Edw. 6. c. 13	14 March 1549
An Act for the true Payment of Tythes. (Repealed by Statute Law Revision Act 1887 (50 & 51 Vict. c. 59))
Hail-shot Act 1548 (repealed)	2 & 3 Edw. 6. c. 14	14 March 1549
An Act against shooting of Hail-shot. (Repealed by Militia, etc. Act 1694 (6 & 7 Will. & Mar. c. 13))
Victuallers, etc. Act 1548 (repealed)	2 & 3 Edw. 6. c. 15	14 March 1549
An Act touching Victuallers and Handicraftsmen. (Repealed by Combinations of Workmen Act 1825 (6 Geo. 4. c. 129))
Custody of Castles, etc. Act 1548 (repealed)	2 & 3 Edw. 6. c. 16	14 March 1549
An Act touching the removing of such as have the Custody of Castles and Fortresses upon the Borders, and beyond the Seas. (Repealed by Statute Law Revision Act 1863 (26 & 27 Vict. c. 125))
Attainder of Sir William Sherington Act 1548 (repealed)	2 & 3 Edw. 6. c. 17	14 March 1549
An Act for the Confirmation of the Attainder of Sir William Sharington, Knight. (Repealed by Statute Law Revision Act 1948 (11 & 12 Geo. 6. c. 62))
Attainder of Thomas Seymour Act 1548 (repealed)	2 & 3 Edw. 6. c. 18	14 March 1549
An Acte for thatteyndeor of Sir Thomas Seymour Knight Lorde Seymour of Sudleye, High Admyrall of Englande. (Repealed by Statute Law (Repeals) Act 1977 (c. 18))
Abstinence from Flesh Act 1548 (repealed)	2 & 3 Edw. 6. c. 19	14 March 1549
An Act for the Abstinence from Flesh. (Repealed by Repeal of Obsolete Statutes Act 1856 (19 & 20 Vict. c. 64))
Payment of Tenths to King Act 1548 (repealed)	2 & 3 Edw. 6. c. 20	14 March 1549
An Act for the qualifying of the Statute of Recusants. (Repealed by First Fruits and Tenths Measure 1926 (16 & 17 Geo. 5. No. 5))
Clergy Marriage Act 1548 (repealed)	2 & 3 Edw. 6. c. 21	14 March 1549
An Act to take away all positive Law made against the Marriage of Priests. (Repealed by Statute Law Revision Act 1887 (50 & 51 Vict. c. 59), Statute Law Revision Act 1888 (51 & 52 Vict. c. 3)) and Statute Law (Repeals) Act 1969 (c. 52))
Customs Act 1548 (repealed)	2 & 3 Edw. 6. c. 22	14 March 1549
An Act against the colouring of Customs in other Mens Names. (Repealed by Repeal of Acts Concerning Importation Act 1822 (3 Geo. 4. c. 41))
Marriages (Pre-contract) Act 1548 (repealed)	2 & 3 Edw. 6. c. 23	14 March 1549
An Act for the Repeal of a Statute touching Precontracts. (Repealed by Marriage Act 1949 (12, 13 & 14 Geo. 6. c. 76))
Criminal Law Act 1548 (repealed)	2 & 3 Edw. 6. c. 24	14 March 1549
An Act for the Trial of Murders and Felonies in sundry Counties. (Repealed by Criminal Law Act 1826 (7 Geo. 4. c. 64))
Sheriff's County Court Act 1548 (repealed)	2 & 3 Edw. 6. c. 25	14 March 1549
An Act for the keeping of the County Days. (Repealed by Sheriffs Act 1887 (50 & 51 Vict. c. 55))
Exportation Act 1548 (repealed)	2 & 3 Edw. 6. c. 26	14 March 1549
An Act against carrying of White Ashes out of the Realm. (Repealed by Exportation Act 1788 (28 Geo. 3. c. 16), confirmed by Repeal of Acts Concerning Importation Act 1822 (3 Geo. 4. c. 41))
Gads of Steel Act 1548 (repealed)	2 & 3 Edw. 6. c. 27	14 March 1549
An Act against the false forging of Gaddes of Steel. (Repealed by Repeal of Obsolete Statutes Act 1856 (19 & 20 Vict. c. 64))
Fines of Lands (Cheshire) Act 1548 (repealed)	2 & 3 Edw. 6. c. 28	14 March 1549
An Act for Fines, with Proclamations, in the County Palatine of Chestre. (Repealed by Statute Law Revision Act 1863 (26 & 27 Vict. c. 125))
Sodomy Act 1548 (repealed)	2 & 3 Edw. 6. c. 29	14 March 1549
An Act against Sodomy. (Repealed by Statute Law Revision Act 1863 (26 & 27 Vict. c. 125))
Rye and Winchelsea Act 1548 (repealed)	2 & 3 Edw. 6. c. 30	14 March 1549
An Act for the Towns of Rye and Winchelseye, and for the casting of Ballast into the Camber. (Repealed by Statute Law Revision Act 1948 (11 & 12 Geo. 6. c. 62))
Recognizances Act 1548 (repealed)	2 & 3 Edw. 6. c. 31	14 March 1549
An Act for the City of Chestre, touching the taking of Recognizances. (Repealed by Statute Law Revision Act 1863 (26 & 27 Vict. c. 125))
Perpetuation of Laws Act 1548 (repealed)	2 & 3 Edw. 6. c. 32	14 March 1549
An Act for the Continuance of certain Statutes. (Repealed by Statute Law Revision Act 1863 (26 & 27 Vict. c. 125))
Horse Stealing Act 1548 (repealed)	2 & 3 Edw. 6. c. 33	14 March 1549
An Act, That no Man stealing any Horse, or Horses, shall enjoy the Benefit of his Clergy. (Repealed for England and Wales by Criminal Statutes Repeal Act 1827 (7 & 8 Geo. 4. c. 27) and for India by Criminal Law (India) Act 1828 (9 Geo. 4. c. 74))
Sheriff of Northumberland Act 1548 (repealed)	2 & 3 Edw. 6. c. 34	14 March 1549
An Act for the Sheriff of Northumberlande to be accountable for his Office, as other Sheriffs be. (Repealed by Statute Law Revision Act 1863 (26 & 27 Vict. c. 125))
Taxation Act 1548 (repealed)	2 & 3 Edw. 6. c. 35	14 March 1549
An Act for the Confirmation of the Subsidy granted by the Clergy. (Repealed by Statute Law Revision Act 1863 (26 & 27 Vict. c. 125))
Taxation (No. 2) Act 1548 (repealed)	2 & 3 Edw. 6. c. 36	14 March 1549
An Act of a Relief granted to the King's Highness by the Temporalty. (Repealed by Statute Law Revision Act 1863 (26 & 27 Vict. c. 125))
Exportation (No. 2) Act 1548 (repealed)	2 & 3 Edw. 6. c. 37	14 March 1549
An Act against the carrying of Bell Metal out of the Realm. (Repealed by Exportation (No. 5) Act 1813 (53 Geo. 3. c. 45))
Calais Act 1548 (repealed)	2 & 3 Edw. 6. c. 38	14 March 1549
An Act for the paving of Calyce. (Repealed by Statute Law Revision Act 1863 (26 & 27 Vict. c. 125))
Act of General Pardon 1548 (repealed)	2 & 3 Edw. 6. c. 39	14 March 1549
The King's Majesty's Free and most General Pardon. (Repealed by Statute Law Revision Act 1863 (26 & 27 Vict. c. 125))

=== Private acts ===
Short title	Citation	Royal assent
Long title
Kent Gavelkind Lands Act 1548	2 & 3 Edw. 6. c. 1 Pr. (Note: This is the citation in The Statutes of the Realm.); 2 & 3 Edw. 6. c. 40 Pr. (Note: This is the citation in The Statutes at Large.)	14 March 1549
An Act for the Alteration of the Nature of certain Gavell-kynde Lands.
Restitution in Blood of Sir George Darcy Act 1548	2 & 3 Edw. 6. c. 2 Pr. 2 & 3 Edw. 6. c. 41 Pr.	14 March 1549
An Act for the Restitution in Blood of Sir George Darcie, Knight.
Restitution in Blood of Frances Carewe Act 1548	2 & 3 Edw. 6. c. 3 Pr. 2 & 3 Edw. 6. c. 42 Pr.	14 March 1549
An Act for the Restitution in Blood of Frauncis Carewe.
Restitution in Blood of Edward Charleton Act 1548	2 & 3 Edw. 6. c. 4 Pr. 2 & 3 Edw. 6. c. 43 Pr.	14 March 1549
An Act for the Restitution in Blood of Edwarde Charleton.
Restitution in Blood of Sir Ralph Bulmer Act 1548	2 & 3 Edw. 6. c. 5 Pr. 2 & 3 Edw. 6. c. 44 Pr.	14 March 1549
An Act for the Restitution in Blood of Sir Raufe Bulmer, Knight.
Restitution in Blood of Henry Weston Act 1548	2 & 3 Edw. 6. c. 6 Pr. 2 & 3 Edw. 6. c. 45 Pr.	14 March 1549
An Act for the Restitution in Blood of Henry Weston.
Restitution in Blood of Ralph Bygode Act 1548	2 & 3 Edw. 6. c. 7 Pr. 2 & 3 Edw. 6. c. 46 Pr.	14 March 1549
An Act for the Restitution in Blood of Raufe Bygode.
Restitution in blood of Thomas Percy Act 1548	2 & 3 Edw. 6. c. 8 Pr. 2 & 3 Edw. 6. c. 47 Pr.	14 March 1549
An Act for the Restitution in Blood of Thomas Percye.
Union of Churches in Lincoln Act 1548	2 & 3 Edw. 6. c. 9 Pr. 2 & 3 Edw. 6. c. 48 Pr.	14 March 1549
An Act for the uniting of Churches in the City of Lyncolne.
Exeter City (Enlargement) Act 1548	2 & 3 Edw. 6. c. 10 Pr. 2 & 3 Edw. 6. c. 49 Pr.	14 March 1549
An Act for the enlarging of the Liberties of the City of Excetre.
Uniting of Churches in Stamford.	2 & 3 Edw. 6. c. 11 Pr. 2 & 3 Edw. 6. c. 50 Pr.	14 March 1549
An Act for the uniting of Churches in the Town of Stamforde.
Bartholomew Burgoyn's Abscondence Overseas Act 1548	2 & 3 Edw. 6. c. 12 Pr. 2 & 3 Edw. 6. c. 51 Pr.	14 March 1549
An Act touching Bartylmewe Burgon.
Assignment of lands to Lord Thomas Howard's sons.	2 & 3 Edw. 6. c. 13 Pr. 2 & 3 Edw. 6. c. 52 Pr.	14 March 1549
An Act for the appointing of certain Lands to my Lord Thomas Haward's two younger Sons.
Bourman's School Act 1548	2 & 3 Edw. 6. c. 14 Pr. 2 & 3 Edw. 6. c. 53 Pr.	14 March 1549
An Act for the erecting of a School at St. Albons.
Anglesea Act 1548 (repealed)	2 & 3 Edw. 6. c. 15 Pr. 2 & 3 Edw. 6. c. 54 Pr.	14 March 1549
An Act for the keeping of the Sessions and County Days of the Isle of Anglesey at Beaumaris. (Repealed by Anglesey Act Repeal Act 1890 (53 & 54 Vict. c. xcvi))
Uniting of Ongar and Greenstead Churches (Essex) Act 1548 (repealed)	2 & 3 Edw. 6. c. 16 Pr. 2 & 3 Edw. 6. c. 55 Pr.	14 March 1549
An Act for the uniting of the Parish-Churches of Onger and Grensted, in the County of Essex. (Repealed by Essex Churches Act 1554 (1 Mar. Sess. 3. c. 10))
Uniting of the churches of St. Clements and St. Nicholas, Rochester.	2 & 3 Edw. 6. c. 17 Pr. 2 & 3 Edw. 6. c. 56 Pr.	14 March 1549
An Act for the uniting of St. Clements, in Rochestre, to the Church of St. Nicholas, in the same City.
Assurance of lands to Earl of Bath, Margaret Long, Lord Fitzwarren and Frances Kitson.	2 & 3 Edw. 6. c. 18 Pr. 2 & 3 Edw. 6. c. 57 Pr.	14 March 1549
An Act for the Assurance of certain Lands to the Earl of Bathe, and Dame Margaret Longe, and to the Lord Fytzwaren and Frauncis Kytsonne.
Mayor of Newcastle and Edward Lawson.	2 & 3 Edw. 6. c. 19 Pr. 2 & 3 Edw. 6. c. 58 Pr.	14 March 1549
An Act touching an Agreement between the Mayor and Commons of Newcastell and Edmunde Lawsone.
Foundation of Berkhamsted School Act 1548	2 & 3 Edw. 6. c. 20 Pr. 2 & 3 Edw. 6. c. 59 Pr.	14 March 1549
An Act for the Foundation of a School in Barckhamstede.
Confirmation of Stamford School Act 1548	2 & 3 Edw. 6. c. 21 Pr. 2 & 3 Edw. 6. c. 60 Pr.	14 March 1549
An Act for the Foundation of a School in Stamforde.

=== Sources ===
- "2° & 3° Edw. VI". The Statutes of the Realm. Vol. 4 Part 1: 1547 to 1584. pp. 36–98 – via Internet Archive.
- "2° & 3° Edw. VI". The Statutes of the Realm. Vol. 4 Part 1: 1547 to 1584. pp. 36–98 – via HathiTrust.
- "2° & 3° Edw. VI". The Statutes of the Realm. Vol. 4 Part 1: 1547 to 1584. pp. 36–98 – via Google Books.
- "Anno secundo & tertio Edw. VI". The Statutes at Large. Vol. 5 – 32 Henry VIII to 7 Edward VI – 1540 to 1552–3. pp. 286–330 – via Internet Archive.
- Journal of the House of Commons. Vol. 1 – 1547-1629. His Majesty's Stationery Office. 1802 – via British History Online.
- Journal of the House of Lords. Vol. 1: 1509-1577. London: His Majesty's Stationery Office. 1830 – via British History Online.
- Chronological Table of and Index to the Statutes. Vol. 1: To the End of the Session 59 Vict. Sess. 2 (1895) (13th ed.). London: Her Majesty's Stationery Office. 1896. p. 55 – via Google Books.
- Chronological Table of the Statutes: Covering the Period from 1235 to the End of 1971. London: Her Majesty's Stationery Office. 1972. p. 52. ISBN 978-0-11-840096-1 – via Google Books.
- "Chronological Tables of the Private and Personal Acts: Part 1 (1539–1601)". legislation.gov.uk. The National Archives.

== See also ==
- List of acts of the Parliament of England
