= List of acts of the Parliament of England from 1543 =

This is a list of acts of the Parliament of England for the year 1543.

For acts passed during the period 1707–1800, see the list of acts of the Parliament of Great Britain. See also the list of acts of the Parliament of Scotland, and the list of acts of the Parliament of Ireland.

For acts passed from 1801 onwards, see the list of acts of the Parliament of the United Kingdom. For acts of the devolved parliaments and assemblies in the United Kingdom, see the list of acts of the Scottish Parliament, the list of acts of the Northern Ireland Assembly, and the list of acts and measures of Senedd Cymru; see also the list of acts of the Parliament of Northern Ireland.

For medieval statutes, etc. that are not considered to be acts of Parliament, see the list of English statutes.

See also the List of ordinances and acts of the Parliament of England, 1642–1660 for ordinances and acts passed by the Long Parliament and other bodies without royal assent, and which were not considered to be valid legislation following the Restoration in 1660.

The number shown after each act's title is its chapter number. Acts are cited using this number, preceded by the years of the reign during which the relevant parliamentary session was held; thus the Union with Ireland Act 1800 is cited as "39 & 40 Geo. 3. c. 67", meaning the 67th act passed during the session that started in the 39th year of the reign of George III and which finished in the 40th year of that reign. The modern convention is to use Arabic numerals in citations (thus "41 Geo. 3" rather than "41 Geo. III"). Acts of the last session of the Parliament of Great Britain and the first session of the Parliament of the United Kingdom are both cited as "41 Geo. 3".

Acts passed by the Parliament of England did not have a short title; however, some of these acts have subsequently been given a short title by acts of the Parliament of the United Kingdom, such as the Short Titles Act 1896 (59 & 60 Vict. c. 14).

Acts passed by the Parliament of England were deemed to have come into effect on the first day of the session in which they were passed. Because of this, the years given in the list below may in fact be the year before a particular act was passed.

== 35 Hen. 8 ==
The third session of the 8th Parliament of King Henry VIII, which met from 14 January 1544 until 29 March 1544.

This session was also traditionally cited as 35 H. 8.

=== Public acts ===
Short title	Citation	Royal assent
Long title
Succession to the Crown Act 1543 or the Third Succession Act (repealed)	35 Hen. 8. c. 1	29 March 1544
An Act concerning the establishment of the King's Majesty's Succession in the Imperial Crown of the Realm. (Repealed by See of Rome Act 1554 (1 & 2 Ph. & M. c. 8), Act of Supremacy 1558 (1 Eliz. 1. c. 1, Statute Law Revision Act 1863 (26 & 27 Vict. c. 125), Statute Law Revision Act 1948 (11 & 12 Geo. 6. c. 62))
Treason Act 1543 (repealed)	35 Hen. 8. c. 2	29 March 1544
An Act concerning the Trial of Treasons committed out of the King's Majesty's Dominions. (Repealed by Criminal Law Act 1967 (c. 58))
King's Style Act 1543 (repealed)	35 Hen. 8. c. 3	29 March 1544
An Act for the Ratification of the King's Majesty's Style. (Repealed by Second Statute of Repeal (1 & 2 Ph. & M. c. 8))
Repair of Decayed Houses Act 1543 (repealed)	35 Hen. 8. c. 4	29 March 1544
An Act touching the Repairing and Amendment of certain decayed Houses and Tenements, in divers Towns, as well in England as in Wales. (Repealed by Statute Law Revision Act 1948 (11 & 12 Geo. 6. c. 62))
Religion Act 1543 (repealed)	35 Hen. 8. c. 5	29 March 1544
An Act concerning the Qualification of the Statute of the Six Articles. (Repealed by Treason Act 1547 (1 Edw. 6. c. 12))
Jurors Act 1543 (repealed)	35 Hen. 8. c. 6	29 March 1544
An Act concerning the Appearance of Jurors in the Nisi Prius. (Repealed by Juries Act 1825 (6 Geo. 4. c. 50))
Fish Act 1543 (repealed)	35 Hen. 8. c. 7	29 March 1544
An Act for the repealing of a certain Statute, concerning the bringing in of Salt Fish and Stock Fish. (Repealed by Statute Law Revision Act 1863 (26 & 27 Vict. c. 125))
Coopers Act 1543 (repealed)	35 Hen. 8. c. 8	29 March 1544
An Act concerning Coopers. (Repealed by Statute Law Revision Act 1863 (26 & 27 Vict. c. 125))
Land Reclamation (Wapping Marsh) Act 1543 (repealed)	35 Hen. 8. c. 9	29 March 1544
An Act concerning the Partition of Wapping Mershe. (Repealed by Statute Law Revision Act 1948 (11 & 12 Geo. 6. c. 62))
London Water Supply Act 1543 (repealed)	35 Hen. 8. c. 10	29 March 1544
An Act concerning the making, repairing, and amending of the Conduits, in London. (Repealed by Statute Law Revision Act 1948 (11 & 12 Geo. 6. c. 62))
Parliament Act 1543 (repealed)	35 Hen. 8. c. 11	29 March 1544
An Act for the due Payment of the Fees and Wages of Knights and Burgesses for the Parliament in Wales. (Repealed by Repeal of Obsolete Statutes Act 1856 (19 & 20 Vict. c. 64))
Loans to the King Act 1543 (repealed)	35 Hen. 8. c. 12	29 March 1544
An Act for the Remission of the Loan. (Repealed by Statute Law Revision Act 1863 (26 & 27 Vict. c. 125))
Lands at Walsingham (Copyhold) Act 1543 (repealed)	35 Hen. 8. c. 13	29 March 1544
An Act, That the Demesne Lands and Tenements, in Walsingham, belonging to the late Priory there, may be lett by Copy of Court Roll. (Repealed by Statute Law Revision Act 1948 (11 & 12 Geo. 6. c. 62))
Lands of Minor Religious Houses Act 1543 (repealed)	35 Hen. 8. c. 14	29 March 1544
An Act for the Reservation of Tenures upon Houses, with Lands belonging to the same, under the clear Yearly Value of Forty Shillings. (Repealed by Statute Law Revision Act 1948 (11 & 12 Geo. 6. c. 62))
Paving of Streets (Cambridge) Act 1543 (repealed)	35 Hen. 8. c. 15	29 March 1544
An Act for paving of Cambridge. (Repealed by Cambridge Improvement Act 1788 (28 Geo. 3. c. 64))
Canon Law Act 1543 (repealed)	35 Hen. 8. c. 16	29 March 1544
An Act concerning the Examination of the Canon Laws by Thirty-two Persons, to be named by the King's Majesty, during his Life. (Repealed by Statute Law Revision Act 1950 (14 Geo. 6. c. 6))
Preservation of Woods Act 1543 (repealed)	35 Hen. 8. c. 17	29 March 1544
An Act for the Preservation of Woods. (Repealed for England and Wales by Criminal Statutes Repeal Act 1827 (7 & 8 Geo. 4. c. 27) and for India by Criminal Law (India) Act 1828 (9 Geo. 4. c. 74))
Act of General Pardon Act 1543 (repealed)	35 Hen. 8. c. 18	29 March 1544
An Act concerning the King's General Pardon. (Repealed by Statute Law Revision Act 1863 (26 & 27 Vict. c. 125))

=== Private acts ===
Short title	Citation	Royal assent
Long title
Exchange between King and William Bonham.	35 Hen. 8. c. 19 Pr. (Note: This is the citation in The Statutes of the Realm.); 35 Hen. 8. c. 5 Pr. (Note: This is the citation in The Statutes at Large.)	29 March 1544
An Act concerning the Purchase of certain Lands of William Bonham, Esquire, by the King's Majesty.
Ratification of Queen Katherine's jointure.	35 Hen. 8. c. 20 Pr. 35 Hen. 8. c. 4 Pr.	29 March 1544
An Act for the Ratification of the Jointure of the Lady Katheryne, now Queen of England.
Exchange between the King and Mr Wollascott.	35 Hen. 8. c. 21 Pr. 35 Hen. 8. c. 14 Pr.	29 March 1544
An Act for an Exchange between the King's Majesty and William Wollascote.
Exchange between the King and Duke of Norfolk and Earl of Surrey.	35 Hen. 8. c. 22 Pr. 35 Hen. 8. c. 1 Pr.	29 March 1544
An Act for an Exchange between the King's Majesty and the Duke of Norff.
Exchange between the King and Denny.	35 Hen. 8. c. 23 Pr. 35 Hen. 8. c. 10 Pr.	29 March 1544
An Act for the Ratification of an Exchange between the King's Majesty, the late Robert Dacres, and Anthonye Denye, Esquire.
Ratification of the King's award between Lord Dacre and the heirs of Sir James Strangways.	35 Hen. 8. c. 24 Pr. 35 Hen. 8. c. 3 Pr.	29 March 1544
An Act for the Ratification of the King's Majesty's Award between the Lord Dacre and the Heirs General of Sir James Strangwishe.
Assurance of the Prebend of East and West Bedwin to the Earl of Hertford.	35 Hen. 8. c. 25 Pr. 35 Hen. 8. c. 11 Pr.	29 March 1544
An Act concerning the Assurance of the Prebend of Est Bedwyn (Note: East and West Bedwin, Wiltshire) to the Earl of Hertforde, Great Chamberlain of England.

=== Sources ===
- "35° Hen. VIII". The Statutes of the Realm. Vol. 3: 1509 to 1547. pp. 954–983 – via HathiTrust.
- "Anno tricesimo quinto Henrici VIII". The Statutes at Large. Vol. 5 – 32 Henry VIII to 7 Edward VI – 1540 to 1552–3. pp. 192–216 – via Internet Archive.
- Journal of the House of Lords. Vol. 1: 1509-1577. London: His Majesty's Stationery Office. 1830 – via British History Online.
- Chronological Table of and Index to the Statutes. Vol. 1: To the End of the Session 59 Vict. Sess. 2 (1895) (13th ed.). London: Her Majesty's Stationery Office. 1896. pp. 53–54 – via Google Books.
- Chronological Table of the Statutes: Covering the Period from 1235 to the End of 1971. London: Her Majesty's Stationery Office. 1972. pp. 50–51. ISBN 978-0-11-840096-1 – via Google Books.
- "Chronological Tables of the Private and Personal Acts: Part 1 (1539–1601)". legislation.gov.uk. The National Archives.

== See also ==
- List of acts of the Parliament of England
