= List of English statutes =

This is a list of medieval statutes and other laws issued under royal authority in the Kingdom of England before the development of Parliament. These instruments are not considered to be Acts of Parliament, which can be found instead at the List of acts of the Parliament of England.

== 11th century ==
- Laws of William the Conqueror 1070–1087
  - One God to be revered throughout the whole realm; peace and security to be preserved between English and Normans
  - Oath of loyalty
  - Protection of the King's Peace
  - Frenchmen to pay "scot and lot"
  - Live cattle to be sold in cities
  - Defence of French allegations of offences
  - Hold the law of King Edward
  - Freeman's pledge and surety
  - Prohibition on the sale of any man by another outside the country
  - Forbidding killings and hangings
- Writ concerning spiritual and temporal courts c. 1072
- Writ concerning conduct of sheriffs c. 1077
- Coronation Charter 1100
  - Freedom of the Church of God
  - Redemption of lands by just and lawful "relief"
  - Marriage
  - Dower
  - Common mintage
  - Pardon of Debts and Fees owing to the King's brother
  - Bequeathments of barons' properties
  - Forfeiture by barons or the King's men
  - Remission of all murder-fines incurred before the crowning of the King
  - Retention of forests
  - Relieving Knight's burden on their land
  - Peace to be kept in all the kingdom
  - Restoration of the law of King Edward
  - Return of lands belonging to the King

== 12th century ==
- Charter concerning the holding of courts of shire and hundred 1108–1111
- Charter on confirmation of laws c. 1135
- Charter on liberties of church 1136
- Charter describing the Treaty of Winchester 1153
- Charter on confirmation of liberties 1154
- Constitutions of Clarendon 1164
- Writ of Henry II addressed to the bishops of England 1164
- Assize of Clarendon 1166
- Charter of Henry II granting Meath to Hugh of Lassy 1172
- Assize of Northampton 1176
- Assize of Arms 1181
- Assize of the Forest 1184
- Ordinance of the Saladin Tithe 1188
- Capitula Itineris (Articles of the Eyre) 1194

== 13th century ==
- Magna Carta 1215
- Magna Carta 1216
- Magna Carta 1217
- Charter of the Forest 1217
- Magna Carta 1225
- Charter of the Forest 1225
- Statute concerning the Jews 1233
- Statute of Jewry 1253
- Royal ordinance on alienation by tenants-in-chief 1256
- Proclamation of 18 October 1258
- Assize of Bread and Ale 1267
- Grant of custom on exported wool, woolfells and hides 1275
- Statute of the Jewry 1275
- Distraint of knighthood 1278
- Statute of Mortmain 1279
- Statute of Mortmain 1290

== See also ==
- List of acts of the Parliament of England
