= List of acts of the Parliament of England from 1545 =

This is a list of acts of the Parliament of England for the year 1545.

For acts passed during the period 1707–1800, see the list of acts of the Parliament of Great Britain. See also the list of acts of the Parliament of Scotland, and the list of acts of the Parliament of Ireland.

For acts passed from 1801 onwards, see the list of acts of the Parliament of the United Kingdom. For acts of the devolved parliaments and assemblies in the United Kingdom, see the list of acts of the Scottish Parliament, the list of acts of the Northern Ireland Assembly, and the list of acts and measures of Senedd Cymru; see also the list of acts of the Parliament of Northern Ireland.

For medieval statutes, etc. that are not considered to be acts of Parliament, see the list of English statutes.

See also the List of ordinances and acts of the Parliament of England, 1642–1660 for ordinances and acts passed by the Long Parliament and other bodies without royal assent, and which were not considered to be valid legislation following the Restoration in 1660.

The number shown after each act's title is its chapter number. Acts are cited using this number, preceded by the years of the reign during which the relevant parliamentary session was held; thus the Union with Ireland Act 1800 is cited as "39 & 40 Geo. 3. c. 67", meaning the 67th act passed during the session that started in the 39th year of the reign of George III and which finished in the 40th year of that reign. The modern convention is to use Arabic numerals in citations (thus "41 Geo. 3" rather than "41 Geo. III"). Acts of the last session of the Parliament of Great Britain and the first session of the Parliament of the United Kingdom are both cited as "41 Geo. 3".

Acts passed by the Parliament of England did not have a short title; however, some of these acts have subsequently been given a short title by acts of the Parliament of the United Kingdom, such as the Short Titles Act 1896 (59 & 60 Vict. c. 14).

Acts passed by the Parliament of England were deemed to have come into effect on the first day of the session in which they were passed. Because of this, the years given in the list below may in fact be the year before a particular act was passed.

== 37 Hen. 8 ==
The first session of the 9th Parliament of King Henry VIII, which met at Westminster from 23 November 1545 until 24 December 1545.

This session was also traditionally cited as 37 H. 8.

=== Public acts ===
Short title	Citation	Royal assent
Long title
Custos Rotulorum Act 1545 (repealed)	37 Hen. 8. c. 1	24 December 1545
An Act for the Offices of the Custos Rotulorum and Clerks of the Peace. (Repealed by Statute Law Revision Act 1887 (50 & 51 Vict. c. 59), Statute Law Revision Act 1948 (11 & 12 Geo. 6. c. 62) and Justices of the Peace Act 1968 (c. 69))
Hounslow Heath Lands (Copyhold, etc.) Act 1545 (repealed)	37 Hen. 8. c. 2	24 December 1545
An Act for the Partition of Hounslowe-Hethe to divers Parishes thereunto adjoining. (Repealed by Statute Law Revision Act 1948 (11 & 12 Geo. 6. c. 62))
Huntington Lane, Cheshire (Repairs) Act 1545 (repealed)	37 Hen. 8. c. 3	24 December 1545
An Act for the Amendment of the Highway beside Chester. (Repealed by Statute Law Revision Act 1948 (11 & 12 Geo. 6. c. 62))
Dissolution of Colleges Act 1545 or the Abolition of Chantries Act 1545 or the Chantries Act 1545 (repealed)	37 Hen. 8. c. 4	24 December 1545
An Act for the Dissolution of Colleges, Chauntries, and Free Chapels, at the King's Majesty's Pleasure. (Repealed by Statute Law Revision Act 1950 (14 Geo. 6. c. 6) and Statute Law (Repeals) Act 1969 (c. 52))
Attaints Act 1545 (repealed)	37 Hen. 8. c. 5	24 December 1545
An Act, That such as have Goods to the Value of 400 Marks, inhabiting in London, may pass in Attaints. (Repealed by Statute Law Revision Act 1863 (26 & 27 Vict. c. 125))
Criminal Law Act 1545 (repealed)	37 Hen. 8. c. 6	24 December 1545
An Act against burning of Frames. (Repealed for England and Wales by Criminal Statutes Repeal Act 1827 (7 & 8 Geo. 4. c. 27) and for India by Criminal Law (India) Act 1828 (9 Geo. 4. c. 74))
Justice of the Peace Act 1545 (repealed)	37 Hen. 8. c. 7	24 December 1545
An Act for the Abrogation of six Weeks Sessions. (Repealed by Statute Law Revision Act 1863 (26 & 27 Vict. c. 125))
Indictments Act 1545 (repealed)	37 Hen. 8. c. 8	24 December 1545
An Act, That an Indictment lacking these Words, "Vi et Armis," shall be sufficient in the Law. (Repealed by Statute Law Revision Act 1863 (26 & 27 Vict. c. 125))
Usury Act 1545 (repealed)	37 Hen. 8. c. 9	24 December 1545
An Act Against Usurie. (Repealed by Usury Laws Repeal Act 1854 (17 & 18 Vict. c. 90))
Libel Act 1545 (repealed)	37 Hen. 8. c. 10	24 December 1545
An Act against slanderous Bills. (Repealed by Statute Law Revision Act 1863 (26 & 27 Vict. c. 125))
Repair of Marshes (East Greenwich) Act 1545 (repealed)	37 Hen. 8. c. 11	24 December 1545
An Act for the Marshes besides Grenwiche. (Repealed by Statute Law Revision Act 1948 (11 & 12 Geo. 6. c. 62))
Tithes in London Act 1545 (repealed)	37 Hen. 8. c. 12	24 December 1545
An Act for Tythes in London. (Repealed by Statute Law Revision Act 1948 (11 & 12 Geo. 6. c. 62))
Statute for Pinners Repeal Act 1545 (repealed)	37 Hen. 8. c. 13	24 December 1545
An Act for repealing of the Statute for Pinners. (Note: Pins Act 1542 (34 & 35 Hen. 8. c. 6)) (Repealed by Statute Law Revision Act 1863 (26 & 27 Vict. c. 125))
Scarborough Pier Act 1545 (repealed)	37 Hen. 8. c. 14	24 December 1545
An Act for the Maintenance of the Pier at Scarboroughe. (Repealed by Pier and Harbour Order (Scarborough) Confirmation Act 1935 (25 & 26 Geo. 5. c. lxi))
Wool Act 1545 (repealed)	37 Hen. 8. c. 15	24 December 1545
An Act against regrating of Wools. (Repealed by Statute Law Revision Act 1863 (26 & 27 Vict. c. 125))
Duchy of Lancaster Act 1545	37 Hen. 8. c. 16	24 December 1545
An Act for the Annexing of certain Lands to the Dutchy of Lancastre, and the Exchange between the King's Majesty, the Archbishops of Canterburie and Yorke, and the Bishop of London.
Ecclesiastical Jurisdiction Act 1545 (repealed)	37 Hen. 8. c. 17	24 December 1545
An Act, That Doctors of Civil Law may exercise Ecclesiastical Jurisdictions. (Repealed by Statute Law Revision Act 1863 (26 & 27 Vict. c. 125))
Crown Lands (Honours of Westminster, Kingston, Saint Osyth's, and Donington) Act 1545 (repealed)	37 Hen. 8. c. 18	24 December 1545
An Act for the ereccon of the Honors of Westminster Kingeston upon Hull, St. Osythes & Donyngton. (Repealed by Statute Law (Repeals) Act 1978 (c. 45))
Fines of Lands in Lancashire Act 1545 (repealed)	37 Hen. 8. c. 19	24 December 1545
An Act for Fines taken in the County Palatine of Lancastre, before the Justices of Lancastre, to be of like Force as Fines taken before the Justices of the Common Place. (Repealed by Statute Law Revision Act 1863 (26 & 27 Vict. c. 125))
Religious Houses Act 1545 (repealed)	37 Hen. 8. c. 20	24 December 1545
An Act for Tenures of Lands of Forty Shillings by Year, and under. (Repealed by Statute Law (Repeals) Act 1989 (c. 43))
Benefices Act 1545 (repealed)	37 Hen. 8. c. 21	24 December 1545
An Act for Union of Churches not exceeding the yearly Value of Six Pounds. (Repealed by Pluralities Act 1838 (1 & 2 Vict. c. 106))
Juries Act 1545 (repealed)	37 Hen. 8. c. 22	24 December 1545
An Act to fill up Juries, de Circumstantibus. (Repealed by Statute Law Revision Act 1863 (26 & 27 Vict. c. 125))
Continuance of Laws Act 1545 (repealed)	37 Hen. 8. c. 23	24 December 1545
An Act for the Continuation of certain Statutes. (Repealed by Statute Law Revision Act 1863 (26 & 27 Vict. c. 125))
Taxation Act 1545 (repealed)	37 Hen. 8. c. 24	24 December 1545
An Act for the Confirmation of the Subsidy granted by the Clergy. (Repealed by Statute Law Revision Act 1863 (26 & 27 Vict. c. 125))
Taxation (No. 2) Act 1545 (repealed)	37 Hen. 8. c. 25	24 December 1545
An Act for a Subsidy granted by the Lay-Fee. (Repealed by Statute Law Revision Act 1863 (26 & 27 Vict. c. 125))

=== Private acts ===
Short title	Citation	Royal assent
Long title
Exchange between the Lord Chancellor, the Lord Great Chamberlain and the Bishop of Salisbury Act 1545	37 Hen. 8. c. 26 Pr. (Note: This is the citation in The Statutes of the Realm.); 37 Hen. 8. c. 1 Pr. (Note: This is the citation in The Statutes at Large.)	24 December 1545
An Act for the Exchange of certain Lands, between the Lord Chancellor, the Lord Great Chamberlain, and the Bishop of Sar.
Knolles' Estate Act 1545	37 Hen. 8. c. 27 Pr. 37 Hen. 8. c. 2 Pr.	24 December 1545
An Act for Francis Knolles, concerning the Manor of Rotherfeldgraie. (Note: Rotherfield Greys, Oxfordshire)
Jasper Hartwell and Others Act 1545	37 Hen. 8. c. 28 Pr. 37 Hen. 8. c. 3 Pr.	24 December 1545
An Act for Jaspare Hartwell and others.
Assurance of the manor of Ashby-Puerorum to Thomas Littlebury Act 1545	37 Hen. 8. c. 29 Pr. 37 Hen. 8. c. 4 Pr.	24 December 1545
An Act for Tho. Litilburie, for the Assurance of the Manor of Ashebie Puerorum. (Note: Ashby-Puerorum, Lincolnshire)
Legitimation of Sir Ralph Sadler's Children Act 1545	37 Hen. 8. c. 30 Pr. 37 Hen. 8. c. 7 Pr.	24 December 1545
An Act for the Legitimation of the children of Sir Ralph Sadler, Knight.
Knights of St. John Marriage Enabling Act 1545	37 Hen. 8. c. 31 Pr. 37 Hen. 8. c. 5 Pr.	24 December 1545
An Act, That the Knights of St. John of Jerlm. in Englande and Irelande, may marry.
Assurance of the Countess of Arundel's Jointure Act 1545	37 Hen. 8. c. 32 Pr. 37 Hen. 8. c. 6 Pr.	24 December 1545
An Act for the Earl of Arundell, concerning the Assurance of my Lady Mary his Wife's Jointure.

=== Sources ===
- "37° Hen. VIII". The Statutes of the Realm. Vol. 3: 1509 to 1547. pp. 984–1032 – via HathiTrust.
- "Anno tricesimo septimo Henrici VIII". The Statutes at Large. Vol. 5 – 32 Henry VIII to 7 Edward VI – 1540 to 1552–3. pp. 217–241 – via Internet Archive.
- Journal of the House of Lords. Vol. 1: 1509-1577. London: His Majesty's Stationery Office. 1830 – via British History Online.
- Chronological Table of and Index to the Statutes. Vol. 1: To the End of the Session 59 Vict. Sess. 2 (1895) (13th ed.). London: Her Majesty's Stationery Office. 1896. p. 54 – via Google Books.
- Chronological Table of the Statutes: Covering the Period from 1235 to the End of 1971. London: Her Majesty's Stationery Office. 1972. p. 51. ISBN 978-0-11-840096-1 – via Google Books.
- "Chronological Tables of the Private and Personal Acts: Part 1 (1539–1601)". legislation.gov.uk. The National Archives.

== See also ==
- List of acts of the Parliament of England
