= List of acts of the Parliament of England from 1539 =

This is a list of acts of the Parliament of England for the year 1539.

For acts passed during the period 1707–1800, see the list of acts of the Parliament of Great Britain. See also the list of acts of the Parliament of Scotland, and the list of acts of the Parliament of Ireland.

For acts passed from 1801 onwards, see the list of acts of the Parliament of the United Kingdom. For acts of the devolved parliaments and assemblies in the United Kingdom, see the list of acts of the Scottish Parliament, the list of acts of the Northern Ireland Assembly, and the list of acts and measures of Senedd Cymru; see also the list of acts of the Parliament of Northern Ireland.

For medieval statutes, etc. that are not considered to be acts of Parliament, see the list of English statutes.

See also the List of ordinances and acts of the Parliament of England, 1642–1660 for ordinances and acts passed by the Long Parliament and other bodies without royal assent, and which were not considered to be valid legislation following the Restoration in 1660.

The number shown after each act's title is its chapter number. Acts are cited using this number, preceded by the years of the reign during which the relevant parliamentary session was held; thus the Union with Ireland Act 1800 is cited as "39 & 40 Geo. 3. c. 67", meaning the 67th act passed during the session that started in the 39th year of the reign of George III and which finished in the 40th year of that reign. The modern convention is to use Arabic numerals in citations (thus "41 Geo. 3" rather than "41 Geo. III"). Acts of the last session of the Parliament of Great Britain and the first session of the Parliament of the United Kingdom are both cited as "41 Geo. 3".

Acts passed by the Parliament of England did not have a short title; however, some of these acts have subsequently been given a short title by acts of the Parliament of the United Kingdom, such as the Short Titles Act 1896 (59 & 60 Vict. c. 14).

Acts passed by the Parliament of England were deemed to have come into effect on the first day of the session in which they were passed. Because of this, the years given in the list below may in fact be the year before a particular act was passed.

== 31 Hen. 8 ==
The first session of the 7th Parliament of King Henry VIII, which met at Westminster from 28 April 1539 until 28 June 1539.

This session was also traditionally cited as 31 H. 8.

No acts were passed during the second session.

=== Public acts ===
Short title	Citation	Royal assent
Long title
Joint Tenants and Tenants in Common Act 1539 (repealed)	31 Hen. 8. c. 1	28 June 1539
An Act concerning Joint Tenants and Tenants in Common. (Repealed by Law of Property (Amendment) Act 1924 (15 & 16 Geo. 5. c. 5))
Fishing Act 1539 (repealed)	31 Hen. 8. c. 2	28 June 1539
An Act that fishing in any several Pond, Stew or Mote, with an Intent to steal Fish out of the same, is Felony. (Repealed for England and Wales by Criminal Statutes Repeal Act 1827 (7 & 8 Geo. 4. c. 27) and for India by Criminal Law (India) Act 1828 (9 Geo. 4. c. 74))
Certain Lands in Kent Disgavelled Act 1539 (repealed)	31 Hen. 8. c. 3	28 June 1539
An Act changing the Custom of Gavelkind. (Repealed by Statute Law Revision Act 1948 (11 & 12 Geo. 6. c. 62))
River Exe Act 1539	31 Hen. 8. c. 4	28 June 1539
An Act concerning the amending of the River and Port of Exeter.
Manor of Hampton Court Act 1539 (repealed)	31 Hen. 8. c. 5	28 June 1539
An Act whereby the King's Manor of Hampton Court is made an Honour, and a new Chase thereto belonging. (Repealed by Statute Law (Repeals) Act 1978 (c. 45))
Monasteries, etc. Act 1539 (repealed)	31 Hen. 8. c. 6	28 June 1539
An Act that such as were religious Persons may purchase, sue and be sued, in all manner of Actions. (Repealed by Statute Law Revision Act 1863 (26 & 27 Vict. c. 125))
Continuance of Laws Act 1539 (repealed)	31 Hen. 8. c. 7	28 June 1539
An Act concerning the Continuance of the Statute for Punishment of Beggars and Vagabonds, and of certain other Statutes. (Repealed by Statute Law Revision Act 1863 (26 & 27 Vict. c. 125))
Proclamation by the Crown Act 1539 (repealed)	31 Hen. 8. c. 8	28 June 1539
An Act that Proclamations made by the King's Highness, with the Advice of His Honourable Council, shall be obeyed, and kept as though they were made by Act of Parliament. (Repealed by Treason Act 1547 (1 Edw. 6. c. 12))
Bishops Act 1539 (repealed)	31 Hen. 8. c. 9	28 June 1539
An Act authorising the King's Highness to make Bishops by his Letters Patent. (Repealed by See of Rome Act 1554 (1 & 2 Ph. & M. c. 8))
House of Lords Precedence Act 1539	31 Hen. 8. c. 10	28 June 1539
An Act concerning placing of the Lords in the Parliament Chamber, and other Assemblies and Conferences of Council.
Wales Act 1539 (repealed)	31 Hen. 8. c. 11	28 June 1539
An Act authorising the King's Highness newly to allot certain Townships in Wales. (Repealed by Statute Law Revision Act 1863 (26 & 27 Vict. c. 125))
Taking of Hawks Act 1539 (repealed)	31 Hen. 8. c. 12	28 June 1539
An Act concerning wrongful taking of Hawks' Eggs and Birds out of the Nests; finding and taking up of the King's Hawks; hunting in the King's Forest, Park or Chase, or other Ground inclosed; and killing of Conies within any lawful Warren of the King's. (Repealed by Statute Law Revision Act 1863 (26 & 27 Vict. c. 125))
Suppression of Religious Houses Act 1539 or the Dissolution of Greater Monasteries Act 1539 or the Second Act of Dissolution or the Second Suppression Act (repealed)	31 Hen. 8. c. 13	28 June 1539
An Act for the Dissolution of all Monasteries and Abbies. (Repealed by Statute Law (Repeals) Act 1969 (c. 52) and Statute Law (Repeals) Act 1989 (c. 43))
Statute of the Six Articles or the Six Articles Act 1539 (repealed)	31 Hen. 8. c. 14	28 June 1539
An Act for abolishing of Diversity of Opinions of certain Articles concerning Christian Religion. (Repealed by Treason Act 1547 (1 Edw. 6. c. 12))

=== Private acts ===
Short title	Citation	Royal assent
Long title
Attainder of Marquis of Exeter and others.	31 Hen. 8. c. 15 Pr. (Note: This is the citation in The Statutes of the Realm.); 31 Hen. 8. c. 1 Pr. (Note: This is the citation in The Statutes at Large.)	28 June 1539
An act for the attainder of the marquiss of Exeter and others.
Lady Taylboys' jointure.	31 Hen. 8. c. 16 Pr. 31 Hen. 8. c. 2 Pr.	28 June 1539
An act for the lady Taylboy's jointure.
Assurance of Mansion House in St. Laurence Pountney to Earl of Sussex.	31 Hen. 8. c. 17 Pr. 31 Hen. 8. c. 3 Pr.	28 June 1539
An act for the assurance of the house of Saint Lawrence Pountney to the earl of Sussex.
Assurance of Chester Place to Earl of Hertford.	31 Hen. 8. c. 18 Pr. 31 Hen. 8. c. 4 Pr.	28 June 1539
An act for the assurance of Chester Place to the earl of Hertford.
Assurance of Rycott Manor to Sir John Williams.	31 Hen. 8. c. 19 Pr. 31 Hen. 8. c. 5 Pr.	28 June 1539
An act for the assurance of the manor of Rycott to Sir John Williams.
Lady Rochford's jointure.	31 Hen. 8. c. 20 Pr. 31 Hen. 8. c. 6 Pr.	28 June 1539
An act for the lady Rochford's jointure.
Assurance of lands to Sir Christopher Hales.	31 Hen. 8. c. 21 Pr. 31 Hen. 8. c. 7 Pr.	28 June 1539
An act for the assurance of certain lands to Sir Christopher Hales.
Restitution of Sir Henry Norreys Act 1539	31 Hen. 8. c. 22 Pr. 31 Hen. 8. c. 8 Pr.	28 June 1539
An act for the restitution of Henry Norries.
Assurance of lands to Sir Richard Rich.	31 Hen. 8. c. 23 Pr. 31 Hen. 8. c. 9 Pr.	28 June 1539
An act for the assurance of lands to Sir Richard Rich, the manor of Little Baddow, the manor of Much Waltham, and other lands in the county of Essex.
Assurance of lands to Sir Henry Long and Sir Thomas Seymour.	31 Hen. 8. c. 24 Pr. 31 Hen. 8. c. 10 Pr.	28 June 1539
An act for the assurance of lands to Sir Henry Long and Sir Thomas Seymour.
Assurance of Bath Place to Earl of Southampton.	31 Hen. 8. c. 25 Pr. 31 Hen. 8. c. 11 Pr.	28 June 1539
An act for the assurance of Bath Place to the earl of Southampton.
Exchange between Bishops of Rochester and Carlisle and Lord Russell.	31 Hen. 8. c. 26 Pr. 31 Hen. 8. c. 12 Pr.	28 June 1539
An act for an exchange between the bishops of Rochester and Carlisle and the lord Russell.
Chancery Clerks' House Act 1539	31 Hen. 8. c. 27 Pr. 31 Hen. 8. c. 13 Pr.	28 June 1539
An act for the six clerks of the chancery for the assurance of their house.
Assurance of lands to Wyatt and Culpeper.	31 Hen. 8. c. 28 Pr. 31 Hen. 8. c. 14 Pr.	28 June 1539
An act concerning the assurance of certain lands, to Thomas Wyatt and Jane his wife, and to Thomas Culpepper and to Elizabeth his wife.

=== Sources ===
- "31° Hen. VIII". The Statutes of the Realm. Vol. 3: 1509 to 1547. pp. 717–743 – via HathiTrust.
- "Anno tricesimo primo Henrici VIII". The Statutes at Large. Vol. 4 – 1 Richard III to 31 Henry VIII – 1483-4 to 1539. pp. 447–471 – via Internet Archive.
- "Anno tricesimo primo Henrici VIII". The Statutes at Large. Vol. 4 – 1 Richard III to 31 Henry VIII – 1483-4 to 1539. pp. 447–471 – via Internet Archive.
- "Anno tricesimo primo Henrici VIII". The Statutes at Large. Vol. 4 – 1 Richard III to 31 Henry VIII – 1483-4 to 1539. pp. 447–471 – via Internet Archive.
- Journal of the House of Lords. Vol. 1: 1509-1577. London: His Majesty's Stationery Office. 1830 – via British History Online.
- Chronological Table of and Index to the Statutes. Vol. 1: To the End of the Session 59 Vict. Sess. 2 (1895) (13th ed.). London: Her Majesty's Stationery Office. 1896. p. 50 – via Google Books.
- Chronological Table of the Statutes: Covering the Period from 1235 to the End of 1971. London: Her Majesty's Stationery Office. 1972. p. 47. ISBN 978-0-11-840096-1 – via Google Books.
- "Acts of the English Parliament from 1539". legislation.gov.uk. The National Archives.
- "Chronological Tables of the Private and Personal Acts: Part 1 (1539–1601)". legislation.gov.uk. The National Archives.

== See also ==
- List of acts of the Parliament of England
