= List of acts of the Parliament of England from 1530 =

This is a list of acts of the Parliament of England for the year 1530.

For acts passed during the period 1707–1800, see the list of acts of the Parliament of Great Britain. See also the list of acts of the Parliament of Scotland, and the list of acts of the Parliament of Ireland.

For acts passed from 1801 onwards, see the list of acts of the Parliament of the United Kingdom. For acts of the devolved parliaments and assemblies in the United Kingdom, see the list of acts of the Scottish Parliament, the list of acts of the Northern Ireland Assembly, and the list of acts and measures of Senedd Cymru; see also the list of acts of the Parliament of Northern Ireland.

For medieval statutes, etc. that are not considered to be acts of Parliament, see the list of English statutes.

See also the List of ordinances and acts of the Parliament of England, 1642–1660 for ordinances and acts passed by the Long Parliament and other bodies without royal assent, and which were not considered to be valid legislation following the Restoration in 1660.

The number shown after each act's title is its chapter number. Acts are cited using this number, preceded by the years of the reign during which the relevant parliamentary session was held; thus the Union with Ireland Act 1800 is cited as "39 & 40 Geo. 3. c. 67", meaning the 67th act passed during the session that started in the 39th year of the reign of George III and which finished in the 40th year of that reign. The modern convention is to use Arabic numerals in citations (thus "41 Geo. 3" rather than "41 Geo. III"). Acts of the last session of the Parliament of Great Britain and the first session of the Parliament of the United Kingdom are both cited as "41 Geo. 3".

Acts passed by the Parliament of England did not have a short title; however, some of these acts have subsequently been given a short title by acts of the Parliament of the United Kingdom, such as the Short Titles Act 1896 (59 & 60 Vict. c. 14).

Acts passed by the Parliament of England were deemed to have come into effect on the first day of the session in which they were passed. Because of this, the years given in the list below may in fact be the year before a particular act was passed.

== 22 Hen. 8 ==
The second session of the 5th Parliament of King Henry VIII (the Reformation Parliament), which met at Westminster from 16 January 1531 until 31 March 1531.

This session was also traditionally cited as 22 H. 8.

Note that cc. 17–23 were traditionally cited as private acts cc. 1–7.

| Short title | Citation | Royal assent |
Long title
| Regrators of Wool Act 1530 (repealed) | 22 Hen. 8. c. 1 | 31 March 1531 |
An Act against Regrators and Gatherers of Wool. (Repealed by Statute Law Revision Act 1863 (26 & 27 Vict. c. 125))
| Foreign Pleas Act 1530 (repealed) | 22 Hen. 8. c. 2 | 31 March 1531 |
An Act for avoiding of foreign Pleas pleaded by Felons. (Repealed by Statute Law Revision Act 1863 (26 & 27 Vict. c. 125))
| Plumstead Marsh (Existing Debts) Act 1530 (repealed) | 22 Hen. 8. c. 3 | 31 March 1531 |
An Act concerning Plumsted Marsh. (Repealed by Statute Law Revision Act 1948 (11 & 12 Geo. 6. c. 62))
| Apprentices' Fees Act 1530 (repealed) | 22 Hen. 8. c. 4 | 31 March 1531 |
An Act concerning the avoiding of Exactions levied on Apprentices. (Repealed by Statute Law Revision Act 1887 (50 & 51 Vict. c. 59))
| Bridges Act 1530 (repealed) | 22 Hen. 8. c. 5 | 31 March 1531 |
An Act concerning the Amendment of Bridges in Highways. (Repealed by Highways Act 1959 (7 & 8 Eliz. 2. c. 25) and London Government Act 1963 (c. 33))
| Butchers Act 1530 (repealed) | 22 Hen. 8. c. 6 | 31 March 1531 |
An Act for Butchers not to keep Tan-houses. (Repealed by Statute Law Revision Act 1863 (26 & 27 Vict. c. 125))
| Exportation Act 1530 (repealed) | 22 Hen. 8. c. 7 | 31 March 1531 |
An Act against Conveyance of Horses out of this Realm. (Repealed by Repeal of Acts Concerning Importation Act 1822 (3 Geo. 4. c. 41))
| Customs Act 1530 (repealed) | 22 Hen. 8. c. 8 | 31 March 1531 |
An Act for Denizens to pay Strangers Customs. (Repealed by Repeal of Acts Concerning Importation Act 1822 (3 Geo. 4. c. 41))
| Poisoning Act 1530 (repealed) | 22 Hen. 8. c. 9 | 31 March 1531 |
An Act for Poisoning. (Repealed by Statute Law Revision Act 1863 (26 & 27 Vict. c. 125))
| Egyptians Act 1530 (repealed) | 22 Hen. 8. c. 10 | 31 March 1531 |
An Act concerning Egyptians. (Repealed by Repeal of Obsolete Statutes Act 1856 (19 & 20 Vict. c. 64))
| Powdyke in Marshland Act 1530 (repealed) | 22 Hen. 8. c. 11 | 31 March 1531 |
An Act concerning Powdike in Marsh-land. (Repealed by Statute Law Revision Act 1948 (11 & 12 Geo. 6. c. 62))
| Vagabonds Act 1530 (repealed) | 22 Hen. 8. c. 12 | 31 March 1531 |
An Act how aged, poor and impotent Persons, compelled to live by Alms, shall be ordered; and how Vagabonds and Beggars shall be punished. (Repealed by Continuance, etc. of Laws Act 1623 (21 Jas. 1. c. 28))
| Aliens Act 1530 (repealed) | 22 Hen. 8. c. 13 | 31 March 1531 |
An Act concerning Bakers, Brewers, Surgeons and Scriveners. (Repealed by Statute Law Revision Act 1863 (26 & 27 Vict. c. 125))
| Abjuration, etc. Act 1530 (repealed) | 22 Hen. 8. c. 14 | 31 March 1531 |
An Act concerning Abjurations into Sanctuaries. (Repealed by Statute Law Revision Act 1863 (26 & 27 Vict. c. 125))
| Pardon to Clergy Act 1530 (repealed) | 22 Hen. 8. c. 15 | 31 March 1531 |
An Act concerning a Pardon granted to the King's Spiritual Subjects of the Province of Canterbury for the Premunire. (Repealed by Statute Law Revision Act 1863 (26 & 27 Vict. c. 125))
| Pardon to Laity Act 1530 (repealed) | 22 Hen. 8. c. 16 | 31 March 1531 |
An Act concerning the Pardon granted to the King's Temporal Subjects for the Premunire. (Repealed by Statute Law Revision Act 1863 (26 & 27 Vict. c. 125))
| Duke of Richmond Act 1530 (repealed) | 22 Hen. 8. c. 17 (Note: This is the citation in The Statutes of the Realm.); 22 Hen. 8. c. 1 Pr. (Note: This is the citation in The Statutes at Large.) | 31 March 1531 |
An Act concerning the duke of Richmond. (Repealed by Statute Law (Repeals) Act 1978 (c. 45))
| Expenses of King's Household Act 1530 (repealed) | 22 Hen. 8. c. 18; 22 Hen. 8. c. 2 Pr. | 31 March 1531 |
An Act concerning the King's houshold. (Repealed by Statute Law Revision Act 1863 (26 & 27 Vict. c. 125))
| Assurance to Heirs of Sir William Fyloll Act 1530 (repealed) | 22 Hen. 8. c. 19; 22 Hen. 8. c. 3 Pr. | 31 March 1531 |
An Act concerning the assurance of certain lands to the heirs of Sir William Fyloll. (Repealed by Statute Law (Repeals) Act 1978 (c. 45))
| Town of Southampton Act 1530 | 22 Hen. 8. c. 20; 22 Hen. 8. c. 4 Pr. | 31 March 1531 |
An Act concerning the town of Southampton.
| Exchange between King and Heirs of Lord Montague Act 1530 (repealed) | 22 Hen. 8. c. 21; 22 Hen. 8. c. 5 Pr. | 31 March 1531 |
An Act of exchange between the King and the heirs of the lord marquis of Montague, and others. (Repealed by Statute Law (Repeals) Act 1978 (c. 45))
| Annuities Granted out of Bishopric of Winchester Act 1530 (repealed) | 22 Hen. 8. c. 22; 22 Hen. 8. c. 6 Pr. | 31 March 1531 |
An Act concerning certain annuities out of the bishoprick of Winchester. (Repealed by Statute Law (Repeals) Act 1978 (c. 45))
| Jointure of Countess of Derby Act 1530 (repealed) | 22 Hen. 8. c. 23; 22 Hen. 8. c. 7 Pr. | 31 March 1531 |
An Act concerning the assurance of the jointure of the lady Dorothy countess of Derby. (Repealed by Statute Law (Repeals) Act 1978 (c. 45))

=== Sources ===
- "22° Hen. VIII". The Statutes of the Realm. Vol. 3: 1509 to 1547. pp. 318–361 – via HathiTrust.
- "22° Hen. VIII". The Statutes of the Realm. Vol. 3: 1509 to 1547. pp. 318–361 – via Google Books.
- "Anno vicesimo secundo Henrici VIII". The Statutes at Large. Vol. 4 - 1 Richard III to 31 Henry VIII - 1483-4 to 1539. pp. 197–212 – via Internet Archive.
- "Anno vicesimo secundo Henrici VIII". The Statutes at Large. Vol. 4 - 1 Richard III to 31 Henry VIII - 1483-4 to 1539. pp. 197–212 – via Internet Archive.
- "Anno vicesimo secundo Henrici VIII". The Statutes at Large. Vol. 4 - 1 Richard III to 31 Henry VIII - 1483-4 to 1539. pp. 197–212 – via Internet Archive.
- Journal of the House of Lords. Vol. 1: 1509-1577. London: His Majesty's Stationery Office. 1830 – via British History Online.
- Chronological Table of and Index to the Statutes. Vol. 1: To the End of the Session 59 Vict. Sess. 2 (1895) (13th ed.). London: Her Majesty's Stationery Office. 1896. p. 46 – via Google Books.
- Chronological Table of the Statutes: Covering the Period from 1235 to the End of 1971. London: Her Majesty's Stationery Office. 1972. pp. 41–42. ISBN 978-0-11-840096-1 – via Google Books.

== See also ==
- List of acts of the Parliament of England
