= List of acts of the Parliament of England from 1532 =

This is a list of acts of the Parliament of England for the year 1532.

For acts passed during the period 1707–1800, see the list of acts of the Parliament of Great Britain. See also the list of acts of the Parliament of Scotland, and the list of acts of the Parliament of Ireland.

For acts passed from 1801 onwards, see the list of acts of the Parliament of the United Kingdom. For acts of the devolved parliaments and assemblies in the United Kingdom, see the list of acts of the Scottish Parliament, the list of acts of the Northern Ireland Assembly, and the list of acts and measures of Senedd Cymru; see also the list of acts of the Parliament of Northern Ireland.

For medieval statutes, etc. that are not considered to be acts of Parliament, see the list of English statutes.

See also the List of ordinances and acts of the Parliament of England, 1642–1660 for ordinances and acts passed by the Long Parliament and other bodies without royal assent, and which were not considered to be valid legislation following the Restoration in 1660.

The number shown after each act's title is its chapter number. Acts are cited using this number, preceded by the years of the reign during which the relevant parliamentary session was held; thus the Union with Ireland Act 1800 is cited as "39 & 40 Geo. 3. c. 67", meaning the 67th act passed during the session that started in the 39th year of the reign of George III and which finished in the 40th year of that reign. The modern convention is to use Arabic numerals in citations (thus "41 Geo. 3" rather than "41 Geo. III"). Acts of the last session of the Parliament of Great Britain and the first session of the Parliament of the United Kingdom are both cited as "41 Geo. 3".

Acts passed by the Parliament of England did not have a short title; however, some of these acts have subsequently been given a short title by acts of the Parliament of the United Kingdom, such as the Short Titles Act 1896 (59 & 60 Vict. c. 14).

Acts passed by the Parliament of England were deemed to have come into effect on the first day of the session in which they were passed. Because of this, the years given in the list below may in fact be the year before a particular act was passed.

== 24 Hen. 8 ==
The fourth session of the 5th Parliament of King Henry VIII (the Reformation Parliament), which met from 4 February 1533 until 7 April 1533.

This session was also traditionally cited as 24 H. 8.

Note that cc. 14–16 were traditionally cited as private acts cc. 1–3.

Short title	Citation	Royal assent
Long title
Leather Act 1532 (repealed)	24 Hen. 8. c. 1	7 April 1533
An Act concerning true tanning and currying of Leather. (Repealed by Statute Law Revision Act 1863 (26 & 27 Vict. c. 125))
Woollen Cloth Act 1532 (repealed)	24 Hen. 8. c. 2	7 April 1533
An Act concerning the true dying of Woollen Cloth. (Repealed by Statute Law Revision Act 1863 (26 & 27 Vict. c. 125))
Sale of Flesh Act 1532 (repealed)	24 Hen. 8. c. 3	7 April 1533
An Act for Flesh to be sold by Weight. (Repealed by Butchers Act 1541 (33 Hen. 8 c. 11))
Flax and Hemp Act 1532 (repealed)	24 Hen. 8. c. 4	7 April 1533
An Act concerning sowing of Flax and Hemp. (Repealed by Statute Law Revision Act 1863 (26 & 27 Vict. c. 125))
Killing Murderers, Robbers, and Burglars Act 1532 (repealed)	24 Hen. 8. c. 5	7 April 1533
An Act where a Man killing evil disposed persons, shall not forfeit his Goods. (Repealed for England and Wales by Offences Against the Person Act 1828 (9 Geo. 4. c. 31) and for India by Criminal Law (India) Act 1828 (9 Geo. 4. c. 74))
Sale of Wines Act 1532 (repealed)	24 Hen. 8. c. 6	7 April 1533
An Act concerning Sale of Wines. (Repealed by Continuance, etc. of Laws Act 1623 (21 Jas. 1. c. 28)
Killing Calves Act 1532 (repealed)	24 Hen. 8. c. 7	7 April 1533
An Act to continue and renew the Act made against killing of Calves. (Repealed by Statute Law Revision Act 1863 (26 & 27 Vict. c. 125))
Costs Act 1532 (repealed)	24 Hen. 8. c. 8	7 April 1533
An Act where Defendants shall not recover any Costs. (Repealed by Civil Procedure Acts Repeal Act 1879 (42 & 43 Vict. c. 59))
Killing Weanlings Act 1532 (repealed)	24 Hen. 8. c. 9	7 April 1533
An Act against killing of young Beasts called Weanlings. (Repealed by Statute Law Revision Act 1863 (26 & 27 Vict. c. 125))
Destruction of Crows, etc. Act 1532 or the Vermin Act 1532 (repealed)	24 Hen. 8. c. 10	7 April 1533
An Act made and ordained to destroy Choughs, Crows and Rooks. (Repealed by Repeal of Obsolete Statutes Act 1856 (19 & 20 Vict. c. 64))
Highway paving between Strond Cross and Charing Cross Act 1532 (repealed)	24 Hen. 8. c. 11	7 April 1533
An Act for paving of the Highway between the Strond Cross and Charing Cross. (Repealed by Statute Law Revision Act 1948 (11 & 12 Geo. 6. c. 62))
Ecclesiastical Appeals Act 1532 (repealed)	24 Hen. 8. c. 12	7 April 1533
An Act that the Appeals in such Cases as have been used to be pursued to the See of Rome, shall not be from henceforth had pursued but within this Realm. (Repealed for Northern Ireland by Statute Law Revision Act 1950 (14 Geo. 6. c. 6) and for England and Wales by Ecclesiastical Jurisdiction Measure 1963 (No. 1), Criminal Law Act 1967 (c. 58) and Statute Law (Repeals) Act 1969 (c. 52))
Apparel Act 1532 (repealed)	24 Hen. 8. c. 13	7 April 1533
An Act for Reformation of Excess in Apparel. (Repealed by Continuance, etc. of Laws Act 1603 (1 Jas. 1. c. 25))
Lands of Walter Walsh Act 1532 (repealed)	24 Hen. 8. c. 14 (Note: This is the citation in The Statutes of the Realm.); 24 Hen. 8. c. 1 Pr. (Note: This is the citation in The Statutes at Large.)	7 April 1533
An Act concerning the Assurance of Lands to Walter Walsh and Dame Elizabeth his Wife, late Wife to Sir William Compton. (Repealed by Statute Law (Repeals) Act 1978 (c. 45))
Repeal of letters patent to Corporation of Hull Act 1532 (repealed)	24 Hen. 8. c. 15; 24 Hen. 8. c. 1 Pr.	7 April 1533
An Act concerning the repealing of Letters Patents granted to the Mayor and Burgesses of the Town of Hull. (Repealed by Statute Law Revision Act 1948 (11 & 12 Geo. 6. c. 62))
London Butchers Act 1532 (repealed)	24 Hen. 8. c. 16; 24 Hen. 8. c. 3 Pr.	7 April 1533
An Acte licensyng the bochers of London to kyll theyr cattell within the walls of the same cytie. (Repealed by Statute Law (Repeals) Act 1973 (c. 39))

=== Sources ===
- "24° Hen. VIII". The Statutes of the Realm. Vol. 3: 1509 to 1547. pp. 417–435 – via HathiTrust.
- "24° Hen. VIII". The Statutes of the Realm. Vol. 3: 1509 to 1547. pp. 417–435 – via Google Books.
- "Anno vicesimo quarto Henrici VIII". The Statutes at Large. Vol. 4 - 1 Richard III to 31 Henry VIII - 1483-4 to 1539. pp. 251–262 – via Internet Archive.
- "Anno vicesimo quarto Henrici VIII". The Statutes at Large. Vol. 4 - 1 Richard III to 31 Henry VIII - 1483-4 to 1539. pp. 251–262 – via Internet Archive.
- "Anno vicesimo quarto Henrici VIII". The Statutes at Large. Vol. 4 - 1 Richard III to 31 Henry VIII - 1483-4 to 1539. pp. 251–262 – via Internet Archive.
- Journal of the House of Lords. Vol. 1: 1509-1577. London: His Majesty's Stationery Office. 1830 – via British History Online.
- Chronological Table of and Index to the Statutes. Vol. 1: To the End of the Session 59 Vict. Sess. 2 (1895) (13th ed.). London: Her Majesty's Stationery Office. 1896. p. 47 – via Google Books.
- Chronological Table of the Statutes: Covering the Period from 1235 to the End of 1971. London: Her Majesty's Stationery Office. 1972. pp. 42–43. ISBN 978-0-11-840096-1 – via Google Books.

== See also ==
- List of acts of the Parliament of England
