= 9th Parliament of Elizabeth I =

Parliament of England, 1597–1598

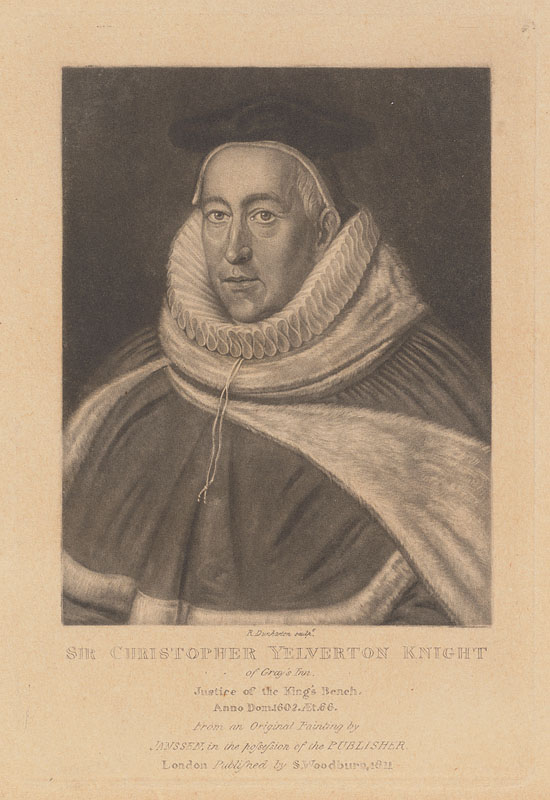
The Speaker, Sir Christopher Yelverton

The 9th Parliament of Queen Elizabeth I was summoned by Queen Elizabeth I of England on 23 August 1597 and assembled on 24 October following. The Parliament was summoned to discuss the problems of food shortages and the need for social and economic legislation to deal with the consequent social problems. The speaker was Sir Christopher Yelverton, the Member of Parliament (MP) for Northampton.

The first day of Parliament, 5 November, was opened by Sir Francis Bacon, MP for Ipswich, with a motion regarding farming, the raising of livestock, and depopulation. He introduced two bills to reduce enclosed pasture land in favour of arable food-producing land, which were debated and eventually passed in a heavily redrafted form, as the Houses of Husbandry Act 1597 and the Tillage Act 1597. Other bills designed to keep down the price of corn and to restrict the wearing of elaborate clothing were rejected.

Sir Henry Finch, MP for Canterbury, opened a discussion about the "miserable estate" of the poor in the country, along with the increase in vagrancy. Eleven bills were put forth to handle this issue, eventually being pared down to four separate Acts; among these were the Poor Relief Act 1597, the Vagabonds Act 1597, and the Hospitals for the Poor Act 1597.

Taxation bills to support the war against Spain at home and on the continent and to deal with chronic unrest in Ireland were approved. A petition to the Queen for an investigation into monopolies elicited a reply that their lawfulness would be examined. In total 28 public and 15 private measures received royal assent.

The Parliament was dissolved on 9 February 1598.

== Other notable acts of the Parliament ==
- Newport and Caerleon Bridges over Usk Act 1597

== See also ==
- List of acts of the 9th Parliament of Queen Elizabeth I
- List of MPs elected to the English parliament in 1597
- List of parliaments of England
