= Newport coat of arms =

Newport coat of arms may apply to

- Coat of arms of Newport, the city of Newport, Wales
- Coat of arms of the town of Newport, Shropshire, England
