= 10th Parliament of Elizabeth I =

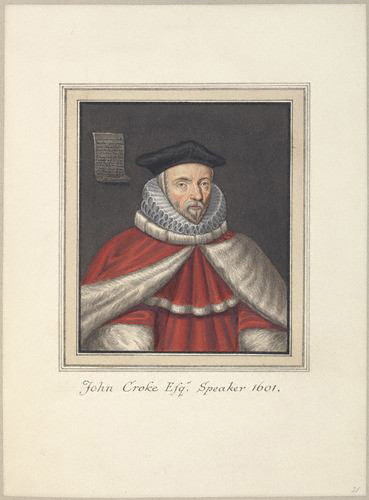
Sir John Croke, Speaker

The 10th Parliament of Queen Elizabeth I was summoned by Queen Elizabeth I of England on 11 September 1601 and assembled on 27 October 1601. It was to be her final Parliament.

At the State Opening of Parliament the Lord Keeper Thomas Egerton explained that the Parliament had been called to authorise the replenishment of the Queen's coffers due to the cost of the war in Ireland and the ongoing threat of Anglo-Spanish War. He also indicated that the Queen wished to see the Parliament dissolved by Christmas. John Croke, Recorder of London and MP for London, was appointed Speaker of the House of Commons.

== Anglo-Spanish war ==
During this time the 10th Parliament was still burdened with the war with Spain. The Parliament provided the funding the Queen would need to go forward with the war. The Anglo-Spanish war had been happening since 1585 and didn’t end until 1604. It was an extremely expensive war and pushed parliament to the war started because Philip II of Spain wanted Protestantism away from his domains and install the Catholic Church. This led to deteriorated relations with Queen Elizabeth I of England who had returned the Church of England to Protestantism. The Church of England encouraged the Dutch protestants to rebel against Philip, leading to disturbances and rebellions throughout France. By the war's end, it had become too costly to continue and ended with Philip III calling for peace. In England, Recusancy Laws were strictly enforced by Parliament to protect the Protestant church and protect England from any invasions from Jesuits and Catholic sympathizers.

== Elizabethan monopolies ==
The subsidy question was debated and agreed upon by November 9 and Parliament turned to other matters. The main issue of the day was the question of the abuse of monopolies. The Crown had for many years granted profitable monopoly rights to individuals in return for favors rendered to the crown, thereby raising the prices of the goods and services involved. The patent system was initially made to nurture economic growth and encourage employment for the poor. It also was an additional source of revenue for parliament and was a way for them to reward new projects brought to them by courtiers. By 1601 monopolies began to overrun parliament due to poor management. Queen Elizabeth had relied on parliament to uphold the ‘Notion of Commonwealth’ which they failed to do. This led to parliament insisting on the abolition of the monopolies and limiting licenses. This was one of the most dramatic confrontations in parliament during the reign of Elizabeth. Parliament considered this as at best an abuse of Royal privilege, and at worst an illegal practice. Previous promises by the Crown to redress the problem had not been fulfilled. She did however commit herself to publish by Proclamation her intention to abolish some patents and allow others to submit to trial by common law. This was a source of tension between the Queen and Parliament. Although many members of parliament were in favour, others, who had been bestowed monopolies, did not want to give up their bribes.

== End of the 10th Parliament ==
Feelings on the issue were so strong that Elizabeth was forced to defuse the situation by inviting 141 MPs to her palace where she delivered the Golden Speech on 30 November 1601. During the speech, she revealed that it would be her final Parliament (she was 68 years old) and won over the delegation by emotively expressing the love and respect she had for the country, her position, and the Members themselves. This speech took many MPs by surprise: they had anticipated that her speech would cover the economic problems that the country had been recently facing. Nevertheless, the speech was well received by Parliament. The speech marked the end of the 10th Parliament.

== Last acts of Parliament ==
The remaining parliamentary time was dedicated to social and economic matters. The Poor Laws of 1597-98 were codified into a new Act which remained in the Statute Book until 1834. A number of bills concerning alehouses and drunkenness, blasphemy, regulation of weights and measures, and the enforcement of church attendance failed to be passed into law. There was a debate in 1601 on whether Parliament should pass the hemp bill, allow the growing of hemp for ropes, or renew the Tillage act which would ban the conversion of land to pasture and increase tillage in the country. After long debates within parliament, the Tillage Act was renewed despite firm opposition. Ultimately, a total of 19 public and 10 private measures did receive royal assent.

== Notable acts of the Parliament ==
- Poor Relief Act 1601
- Charitable Uses Act 1601

== See also ==
- List of acts of the 10th Parliament of Queen Elizabeth I
- List of parliaments of England
