= Continuance, etc. of Laws Act 1601 =

Act of the Parliament of England

- Act of Parliament
- Parliament of England
- Long title: An Act for Continuance of divers Statutes, and for Repeal of some others.
- Citation: 43 Eliz. 1. c. 9
- Territorial extent: England and Wales

Dates
- Royal assent: 19 December 1601
- Commencement: 27 October 1601 (Note: Start of session.)
- Repealed: 28 July 1863
Other legislation
Amends	Tillage Act 1597; Navigation Act 1597; See § Revived and continued enactments
Repeals/revokes	See § Repealed enactments
Amended by	Continuance of Laws, etc. Act 1627; Residence on Benefices, etc. (England) Act 1817
Repealed by	Statute Law Revision Act 1863
Relates to	See Expiring laws continuance acts

Status: Repealed

Text of statute as originally enacted

The Continuance, etc. of Laws Act 1601 (43 Eliz. 1. c. 9) was an act of the Parliament of England that revived, continued and repealed various older acts.

== Provisions ==
=== Revived and continued enactments ===
Section 1 of the act continued 30 enactments, listed in that section, until the first session of the next parliament.

Section 2 of the act provided, however, that the provisions in section 10 of the Vagabonds (No. 2) Act 1597 (39 Eliz. 1. c. 4) relating to John Dutton in the County of Chester, which would remain in force for one year following the start of the session of the present parliament, unless Dutton could produce a certificate demonstrating his liberty to license minstrels as he claimed.

Citation	Short title	Description	Extent of continuation
21 Hen. 8. c. 12	Manufacture of Cables, etc. Act 1529	An act made in the one and twentieth year of the reign of the late King Henry the Eighth, intituled, An act for the true making of cables, baskets and ropes.	The whole act.
24 Hen. 8. c. 9	Killing Weanlings Act 1532	An act made in the four and twentieth year of the reign of the late King Henry the Eighth, intituled, An act against killing of young beasts.	The whole act.
3 & 4 Edw. 6. c. 19	Buying Cattle Act 1549	two acts made in the fourth year of the reign of the late King Edward the Sixth, the one concerning buying and selling of cattle.	The whole act.
3 & 4 Edw. 6. c. 21	Butter and Cheese Act 1549	Two acts made in the fourth year of the reign of the late King Edward the Sixth; the other concerning the buying and selling act for the buying and selling of butter and cheese.	The whole act.
1 Eliz. 1. c. 17	Fisheries Act 1558	An act made in the first year of the Queen's majesty's reign that now is, intituled, An act for preservation of spawn and fry of fish.	The whole act.
5 Eliz. 1. c. 7	Importation Act 1562	An act made in the fifth year of the Queen's majesty's reign that now is, intituled, An act for avoiding divers foreign wares made by handicraftsmen beyond the seas.	The whole act.
5 Eliz. 1. c. 5	Maintenance of the Navy Act 1562	An act made in the fifth year of her Majesty's reign, intituled, An act touching certain politick constitutions made for the maintenance of the navy, together with all and every addition, explanation and alterations made thereunto or thereof, or of any part thereof, by any statute or statutes made sithence the making of the first act, and now continuing in force.	The whole act.
8 Eliz. 1. c. 10	Bows Act 1566	An act made in the eighth year of her majesty's reign that now is, intituled, An act for bowyers, and the prices of bows.	The whole act.
13 Eliz. 1. c. 20	Benefices Act 1571	An act made in the thirteenth year of the Queen's majesty's reign that now is, intituled, An act touching leases of benefices and other ecclesiastical livings with cure, together with all and every explanation, additions and alterations thereof, or thereunto made by any other statute or statutes made sithence the making of the said act, and now continuing in force.	The whole act. With this further addition to be enacted by authority of this present parliament, That all judgments hereafter to be had, for the intent to have or enjoy any lease contrary to the said statutes, or any of them, shall be deemed void, in such sort as bonds and covenants are appointed to be void which are made for that purpose.
13 Eliz. 1. c. 21	Purveyance Act 1571	An act made in the same thirteenth year of her majesty's reign, intituled, An act that purveyors may take grain, corn and victuals within five miles of Cambridge and Oxford in certain cases.	The whole act.
18 Eliz. 1. c. 20	Road Repairs (Oxford) Act 1575	An act made in the eighteenth year of the Queen's majesty's reign, intituled, An act for the repairing and amending of the bridges and highways near unto the city of Oxford.	The whole act.
18 Eliz. 1. c. 3	Poor Act 1575	One other act made the same year, intituled, An act for the setting the poor on work, and avoiding of idleness.	As concerneth bailiffs begotten out of lawful matrimony. I.e., section 1.
23 Eliz. 1. c. 6	Dover Harbour Act 1580	An act made in the three and twentieth year of her Majesty's reign, intituled, An act for the repairing of Dover haven, with the provisions and alterations thereof made by an act made in the five and thirtieth year of the Queen's majesty's reign that now is.	The whole act.
27 Eliz. 1. c. 31 (Note: This is the citation in The Statutes of the Realm.) 27 Eliz. 1. c. 17 Pr. (Note: This is the citation in The Statutes at Large.)	Government of the City of Westminster Act 1584	An act made in the seven and twentieth year of her Majesty's reign, intituled, An act for the good government of the city or borough of Westminster	The whole act.
27 Eliz. 1. c. 14	Malt Act 1584	An act made in the seven and twentieth year of her Majesty's reign, intituled, An act for the reviving of a former statute for the true making of malt.	The whole act.
39 Eliz. 1. c. 16	Malt Act 1597	An act made in the nine and thirtieth year of her Majesty's reign, intituled An act to refrain the excessive making of malt.	The whole act.
27 Eliz. 1. c. 24	Norfolk Coast Sea Defences Act 1584	An act made in the seventh and twentieth year of her Majesty's reign, intituled, An act for the keeping of the sea-banks and sea-works in the county of Norfolk.	The whole act.
31 Eliz. 1. c. 8	Sale of Beer Act 1588	An act made in the one and thirtieth year of her Majesty's reign, intituled, An act for the true gaging of vessels brought from beyond the seas, commonly by brewers for the utterance and sale of ale and beer.	The whole act.
31 Eliz. 1. c. 5 Pr.	Relief of the City of Lincoln Act 1588	An act made in the first one and thirtieth year of her Majesty's reign, intituled, An act for reviving and enlarging of a statute made in the three and twentieth year of her Majesty's reign, for the relief of the city of Lincoln.	The whole act.
35 Eliz. 1. c. 1	Religion Act 1592	Three acts made in the five and thirtieth year of her Majesty's reign, one intituled, An act to retain the Queen's majesty's subjects in their due obedience.	The whole act.
35 Eliz. 1. c. 10	Cloth Act 1592	Three acts made in the five and thirtieth year of her Majesty's reign, another act, intituled, An act for the reformation of sundry abuses in clothes called Devonshire kersies or dozens, according to a proclamation of the thirty and fourth year of the reign of our sovereign lady the Queen's majesty that now is.	The whole act.
35 Eliz. 1. c. 11	Clapboard Act 1592	Three acts made in the five and thirtieth year of her Majesty's reign, one other, intituled, An act for the bringing in of clapboard from the parts of beyond the seas, and the restraining of transporting of wine-cask, for the sparing and preserving of timber within the realm.	The whole act.
39 Eliz. 1. c. 1	Houses of Husbandry Act 1597	Several acts hereafter mentioned, made in the nine and thirtieth year of her Majesty's reign, viz. (that is to say) an act intituled, An act against the decaying of towns, and houses of husbandry.	The whole act.
39 Eliz. 1. c. 2	Tillage Act 1597	Several acts hereafter mentioned, made in the nine and thirtieth year of her Majesty's reign, viz. (that is to say) An act for the maintenance of husbandry and tillage.	The whole act.
39 Eliz. 1. c. 7	Crown Debts Act 1597	Several acts hereafter mentioned, made in the nine and thirtieth year of her Majesty's reign, viz. (that is to say) an act, intituled, An act for the more speedy payment of the Queen's majesty's debts, and for the better explanation of the act made in the thirteenth year of the Queen's majesty's reign, intituled, An act to make the lands, tenements, goods and chattels of tellers, receivers, &c. liable to the payment of their debts.	The whole act.
39 Eliz. 1. c. 10	Navigation Act 1597	Several acts hereafter mentioned, made in the nine and thirtieth year of her Majesty's reign, viz. (that is to say) an act, intituled, An act for the increase of mariners, and for maintenance of the navigation, a repealing a former act made in the twenty and thirtieth year of her Majesty's reign, bearing the same title	The whole act.
39 Eliz. 1. c. 12	Labourers Act 1597	Several acts hereafter mentioned, made in the nine and thirtieth year of her Majesty's reign, viz. (that is to say) an act, intituled, An act for explanation of the statute made in the fifth year of her Majesty's reign, concerning labourers.	The whole act.
39 Eliz. 1. c. 14	Importation Act 1597	Several acts hereafter mentioned, made in the nine and thirtieth year of her Majesty's reign, viz. (that is to say) an act, intituled, An act prohibiting the bringing into this realm of foreign cards for wool.	The whole act.
39 Eliz. 1. c. 4	Vagabonds (No. 2) Act 1597	Several acts hereafter mentioned, made in the nine and thirtieth year of her Majesty's reign, viz. (that is to say) An act against lewd and wandering persons pretending themselves to be soldiers or mariners.	The whole act.
39 Eliz. 1. c. 17	Vagabonds Act 1597	Several acts hereafter mentioned, made in the nine and thirtieth year of her Majesty's reign, viz. (that is to say) an act, intituled, An act for punishment of rogues, vagabonds and sturdy beggars.	The whole act.

Section 3 of the act continued the Poor Relief Act 1597 (39 Eliz. 1. c. 3) until the end of the next session of parliament, unless an act was passed in the present session to replace it. (Note: This was the Poor Relief Act 1601 (43 Eliz. 1. c. 2)) Section 3 of the act also continued the Disabled Soldiers Act 1592 (35 Eliz. 1. c. 4) and the Disabled Soldiers Act 1597 (c. 21) until the end of the next session of parliament, unless an act was passed in the present session to replace it. (Note: This was the Disabled Soldiers Act 1601 (43 Eliz. 1. c. 3))

=== Repealed enactments ===
Section 4 of the act repealed the Charitable Trusts Act 1597 (39 Eliz. 1. c. 6), which was replaced by the Charitable Uses Act 1601 (43 Eliz. 1. c. 4).

Section 5 of the act provided that decrees made under the Charitable Trusts Act 1597 (39 Eliz. 1. c. 6) would remain in force.

Section 6 of the act exempted the County of Northumberland from the Tillage Act 1597 (39 Eliz. 1. c. 3).

Section 7 of the act repealed so much of section 5 of the Navigation Act 1597 (39 Eliz. 1. c. 10) "as concerneth the repealing and making void of all ordinances of the fishmongers of London, or of any other company or corporation whatsoever, made or to be made for restraint of any person to take or sell fish, or to buy or provide any fish of any merchant or other within this realm, or the making or executing of any such ordinance or restraint".

Section 8 of the act provided provided that no ordinance could restrict the trade of wholesome salted fish or herrings during the continuance of the Navigation Act 1597 (39 Eliz. 1. c. 10).

Section 9 of the act provided that ships over twenty tons owned by the Queen's subjects would only pay Dover Haven duties under the Dover Harbour Act 1580 (23 Eliz. 1. c. 6) of three pence per ton on their cargo rather than on the ship's total capacity, while fishing vessels would only pay duties on oil and merchandise they brought back, not on fish or vessel tonnage.

== Subsequent developments ==
So much of the act "as relates to spiritual persons holding of farms, and to leases of benefices and livings, and to buying and selling, and to residence of spiritual persons on their benefices" was repealed by section 1 of the Residence on Benefices, etc. (England) Act 1817 (57 Geo. 3. c. 99), which came into force on 10 July 1817.

The whole act was repealed by section 1 of, and the schedule to, the Statute Law Revision Act 1863 (26 & 27 Vict. c. 125), which came into force on 28 July 1863.
