= Residence on Benefices, etc. (England) Act 1817 =

Act of the Parliament of the United Kingdom

- Act of Parliament
- Parliament of the United Kingdom
- Long title: An Act to consolidate and amend the Laws relating to Spiritual Persons holding of Farms; and for enforcing the Residence of Spiritual Persons on their Benefices; and for the Support and Maintenance of Stipendiary Curates in England.
- Citation: 57 Geo. 3. c. 99
- Territorial extent: England and Wales; Scotland; (Note: Section 85.)

Dates
- Royal assent: 10 July 1817
- Commencement: 10 July 1817 (Note: The Acts of Parliament (Commencement) Act 1793.)
- Repealed: 14 August 1838

Other legislation
- Amends: See § Repealed enactments
- Repeals/revokes: See § Repealed enactments
- Repealed by: Pluralities Act 1838

Status: Repealed

Text of statute as originally enacted

The Residence on Benefices, etc. (England) Act 1817 (57 Geo. 3. c. 99) was an act of the Parliament of the United Kingdom that consolidated enactments relating to the holding of farms by spiritual persons, the residence of the clergy on their benefices, and the support and maintenance of stipendiary curates, in the Church of England.

== Provisions ==
=== Repealed enactments ===
Section 1 of the act repealed 12 enactments, listed in that section.

Citation	Short title	Description	Extent of repeal
21 Hen. 8. c. 13	Clergy Act 1529	An Act that no Spiritual Persons shall take to farm, of the King or any other Person, any Lands or Tenements for Term of Life, Lives, Years or at Will, &c.; and for Pluralities of Benefices; and for Residence.	As relates to spiritual persons holding of farms, and to leases of benefices and livings, and to buying and selling, and to residence of spiritual persons on their benefices.
28 Hen. 8. c. 13	Clergy Act 1536	An Act for compelling Spiritual Persons to keep Residence upon their Benefices.	The whole act.
13 Eliz. 1. c. 20	Benefices Act 1571	An Act touching Leases of Benefices, and Ecclesiastical Livings with Cure.	As relates to spiritual persons holding of farms, and to leases of benefices and livings, and to buying and selling, and to residence of spiritual persons on their benefices.
14 Eliz. 1. c. 11	Ecclesiastical Leases Act 1572	An Act for the Continuation, Explanation, perfecting, and enlarging of divers Statutes.	As relates to spiritual persons holding of farms, and to leases of benefices and livings, and to buying and selling, and to residence of spiritual persons on their benefices.
18 Eliz. 1. c. 11	Ecclesiastical Leases Act 1575	An Acte for Thexplanacion of the Statutes entytuled againste the defeating of Dilapidacions, and againste Leases to bee made of Spirituall Promocions in some Respectes.	As relates to spiritual persons holding of farms, and to leases of benefices and livings, and to buying and selling, and to residence of spiritual persons on their benefices.
43 Eliz. 1. c. 9	Continuance, etc. of Laws Act 1601	An Act for Continuance of divers Statutes, and for Repeal of some others.	As relates to spiritual persons holding of farms, and to leases of benefices and livings, and to buying and selling, and to residence of spiritual persons on their benefices.
3 Cha. 1. c. 5	Continuance of Laws, etc. Act 1627	An Act for the Continuance and Repeal of divers Statutes.	As relates to spiritual persons holding of farms, and to leases of benefices and livings, and to buying and selling, and to residence of spiritual persons on their benefices.
12 Ann. St. 2. c. 12	Simony Act 1713	An Act for the better Maintenance of the Curates within the Church of England, and for preventing any Ecclesiastical Persons from buying the next Avoidance of any Church Preferment.	As relates to spiritual persons holding of farms, and to leases of benefices and livings, and to buying and selling, and to residence of spiritual persons on their benefices.
36 Geo. 3. c. 83	Curates, etc. Act 1796	An Act for the further Support and Maintenance of Curates within the Church of England, and for making certain Regulations respecting the Appointment of such Curates, and the Admission of Persons to Cures augmented by Queen Anne's Bounty, with respect to the Avoidance of other Benefices.	As relates to spiritual persons holding of farms, and to leases of benefices and livings, and to buying and selling, and to residence of spiritual persons on their benefices.
43 Geo. 3. c. 84	Benefices (England) Act 1803	An Act to amend the Laws relating to Spiritual Persons holding of Farms, and for enforcing the Residence of Spiritual Persons on their Benefices in England.	The whole act.
43 Geo. 3. c. 109	Benefices (England) (No. 2) Act 1803	An Act to rectify a Mistake in an Act made in this present Session of Parliament, intituled "An Act to amend the Laws relating to Spiritual Persons holding of Farms, and for enforcing the Residence of Spiritual Persons on their Benefices in England," and to remove a Doubt respecting the Title of the Statute of the Twenty-first Year of King Henry the Eighth therein mentioned.	The whole act.
53 Geo. 3. c. 149	Stipendiary Curates Act 1813	An Act for the further Support and Maintenance of Stipendiary Curates.	The whole act.

== Subsequent developments ==
The whole act was repealed by section 1 of the Pluralities Act 1838 (1 & 2 Vict. c. 106), which came into force on 14 August 1838.
