= Charitable Uses Act 1601 =

Act of the Parliament of England

- Act of Parliament
- Parliament of England
- Long title: An Act to redress the Mis-employment of Lands, Goods and Stocks of Money heretoforegiven to certain charitable Uses.
- Citation: 43 Eliz. 1. c. 4
- Territorial extent: England and Wales

Dates
- Royal assent: 19 December 1601
- Commencement: 27 October 1601 (Note: Start of session.)
- Repealed: 13 August 1888
Other legislation
| Amended by | Statute Law Revision Act 1888 |
| Repealed by | Mortmain and Charitable Uses Act 1888 |
| Relates to | Charitable Trusts Act 1597; Continuance, etc. of Laws Act 1601; Charitable Trusts Act 1597 |

Status: Repealed

Text of statute as originally enacted

The Charitable Uses Act 1601 (43 Eliz. 1. c. 4) or the Charitable Gifts Act 1601 (also known as the Statute of Elizabeth or the Statute of Charitable Uses) was an act of the Parliament of England. It was repealed by section 13(1) of the Mortmain and Charitable Uses Act 1888 (51 & 52 Vict. c. 42) (but see section 13(2) of that act, which left the preamble of this act unrepealed.).

The act replaced the Charitable Trusts Act 1597 (39 Eliz. 1. c. 6), which was repealed by section 4 of the Continuance, etc. of Laws Act 1601 (43 Eliz. 1. c. 9).

The preamble to the act contained a list of purposes or activities that was, in effect, a list of purposes or activities that the state believed were of general benefit to society, and to which the state wanted to encourage private contributions. The list has formed the foundation of the modern definition of charitable purposes, which has developed through case law. This has come about because the courts, in considering whether or not a particular purpose was charitable in law, have tended to look for an analogy between the purpose under consideration and the list, and to recognise the purpose as charitable if an analogy with the 1601 list could be found.

The list contained in the preamble is:

1. "The relief of aged, impotent, and poor people."
2. "The maintenance of sick and maimed soldiers and mariners."
3. "The maintenance of schools of learning, free schools, and scholars in universities."
4. "The repair of bridges, ports, havens, causeways, churches, sea-banks, and highways."
5. "The education and preferment of orphans."
6. "The relief, stock, or maintenance for houses of correction."
7. "Marriages of poor maids."
8. "The supportation, aid, and help of young tradesmen, handicraftsmen, and persons decayed."
9. "The relief or redemption of prisoners or captives."
10. "The aid or ease of any poor inhabitants concerning payment of fifteens, (Note: A property tax introduced in 1334.) setting out of soldiers, and other taxes."
