= Houses of Husbandry Act 1597 =

Act of the Parliament of England

- Act of Parliament
- Parliament of England
- Long title: An Act against the decaying of towns and houses of husbandry.
- Citation: 39 Eliz. 1. c. 1
- Territorial extent: England and Wales

Dates
- Royal assent: 9 February 1598
- Commencement: 24 October 1597 (Note: Start of session.)
- Repealed: 28 July 1863

Other legislation
- Amended by: Continuance, etc. of Laws Act 1601
- Repealed by: Statute Law Revision Act 1863

Status: Repealed

Text of statute as originally enacted

The Houses of Husbandry Act 1597 (39 Eliz. 1. c. 1) was an act of the Parliament of England passed during the reign of Elizabeth I. It was declared to be "An Act against the decaying of towns and houses of husbandry".

The act commanded lords who had let their "houses of husbandry" decay since 1590 to rebuild them. A "house of husbandry" was defined as a house possessing twenty acres of land that had been occupied or let to farm for at least three years during the Queen's reign. The act ordered that they were to continue in this state "for ever".

== Subsequent developments ==
The act was continued until the end of the next session by the Continuance, etc. of Laws Act 1601 (43 Eliz. 1. c. 9).

The whole act was repealed by section 1 of, and the schedule to, the Statute Law Revision Act 1863 (26 & 27 Vict. c. 125), which came into force on 28 July 1863.
