= Caerleon Bridge =

Grade II listed bridge in Newport, Wales

Coordinates: 51°36′26″N 2°57′09″W

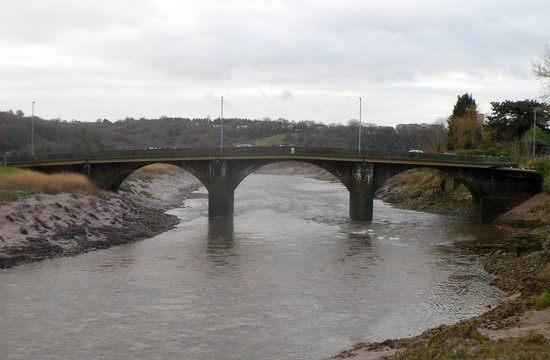
Caerleon Bridge

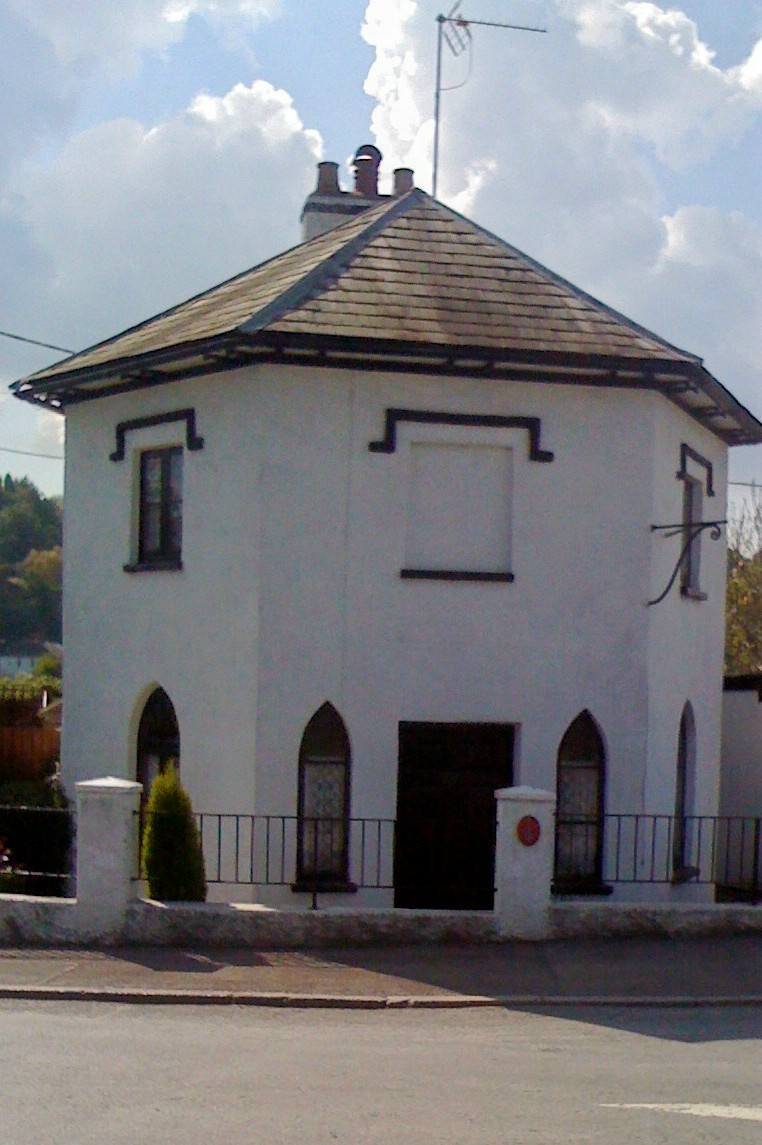
The Toll House, Caerleon Bridge

Caerleon Bridge is a bridge crossing of the River Usk at Caerleon in the city of Newport, Wales, carrying the B4236 road from Caerleon-ultra-Pontem into Caerleon itself.

The stone-built bridge was built by David Edwards between 1806 and 1812 as a replacement for the previous wooden bridge. Prior to the opening of the A449 dual carriageway a few miles to the east in 1972, the narrow bridge and streets of Caerleon carried the trunk road from Newport to Raglan via Caerleon Bridge. A steel and concrete footbridge was attached in 1974.

The bridge is the furthest upstream of the twelve bridges over the River Usk within the city boundaries of Newport.

The foundation stone of the original Newport Bridge is set into the stonework of Caerleon Bridge bearing the inscription "This bridge was erected at the expense of the County by David Edwards and his two sons William and Thomas. Completed AD MDCCC."

== See also ==
- Newport and Caerleon Bridges over Usk Act 1597
- List of bridges in Wales
