= Newport Town Bridge =

Newport Bridge
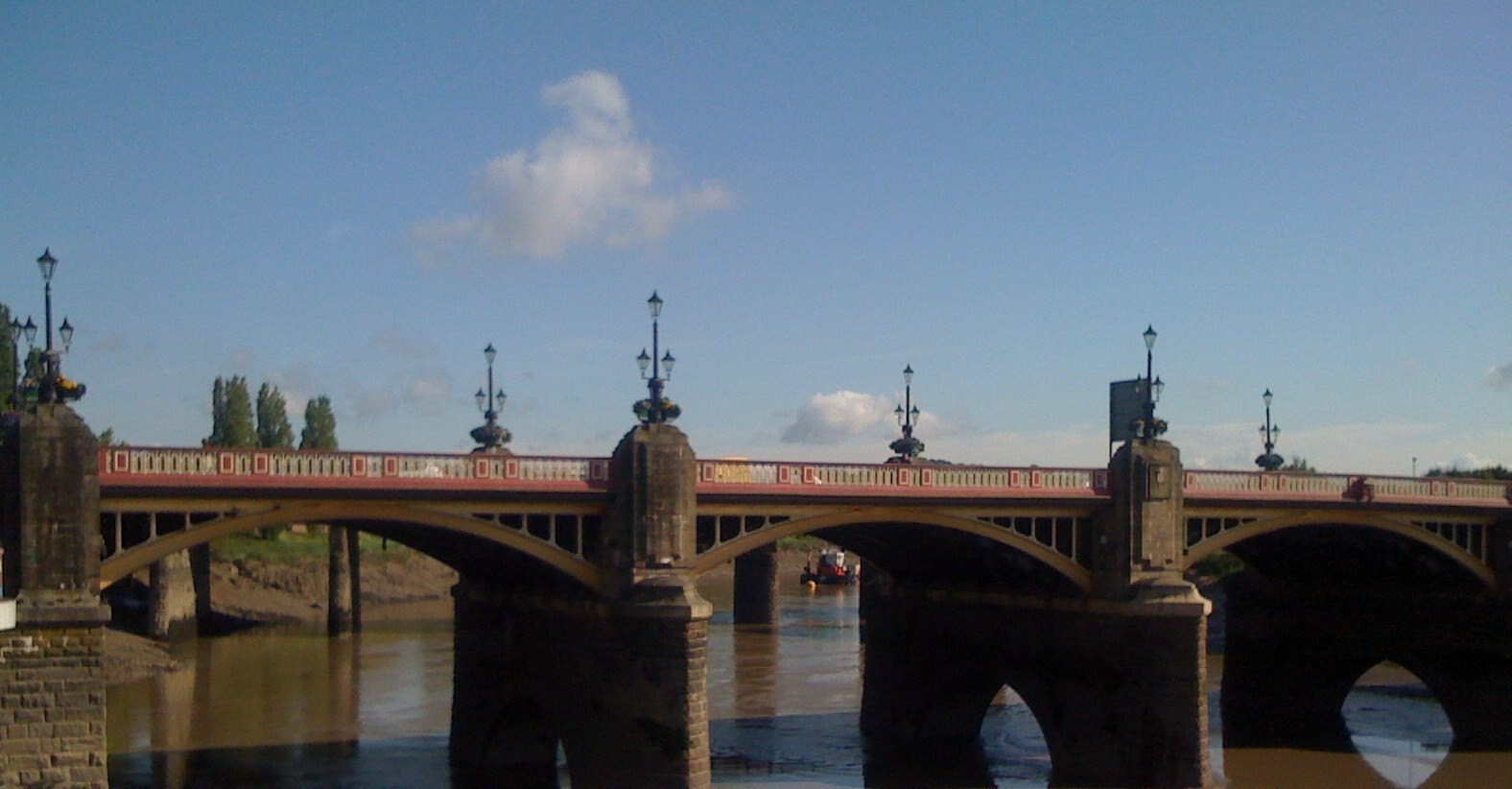
- Newport Bridge in 2011.
- Coordinates: 51°35′26″N 2°59′38″W
- Carries: Motor vehicles, cyclists and pedestrians
- Crosses: River Usk
- Locale: Newport
- Official name: Newport Bridge
- Maintained by: Newport City Council

Characteristics
- Design: Five-span arch bridge
- Total length: ? feet (? metres)
- Width: Four-lane carriageway, two cycle/footpaths
- Longest span: ? m (? ft)

History
- Opened: 22 June 1927

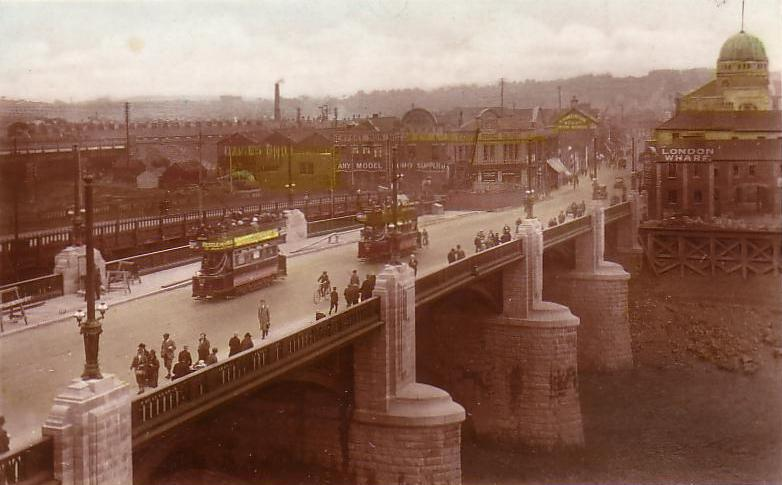
Newport Bridge shortly after opening. Note the temporary bridge to the left and Newport Technical Institute to the right

Newport Bridge (colloquially called Town Bridge) crosses the River Usk in Newport. Opened in 1927, it connects the High Street and Clarence Place with Newport Castle and Newport city centre.

== The 1800 bridge ==
The first stone bridge on the site was a bridge of five arches, erected in 1800 by David Edwards (son of William Edwards). It was widened and improved in 1866 by adding footpaths on both sides.

The original foundation stone bearing the inscription "This bridge was erected at the expense of the County by David Edwards and his two sons William and Thomas. Completed AD MDCCC." is now set into the stonework of Caerleon Bridge.

== Paddle steamers ==
A blue plaque on the bridge erected by Newport Civic Society commemorates the Newport harbour commissioners landing stage and states "Paddle steamers of P&A Campbell's famous white funnel fleet regularly sailed from near this point. Opened in the 1880s, extended in the mid 1890s and closed in the 1950s".

== Harry Houdini ==
On 5 March 1913, the famous escape artist Harry Houdini jumped off Newport Bridge with his hands manacled and his feet shackled. He had been turned back by police but caught a taxi cab across the bridge and entered from the opposite side. He was arrested the following week by the police for obstructing a public highway and for holding a public entertainment on the bridge.

== The new bridge ==
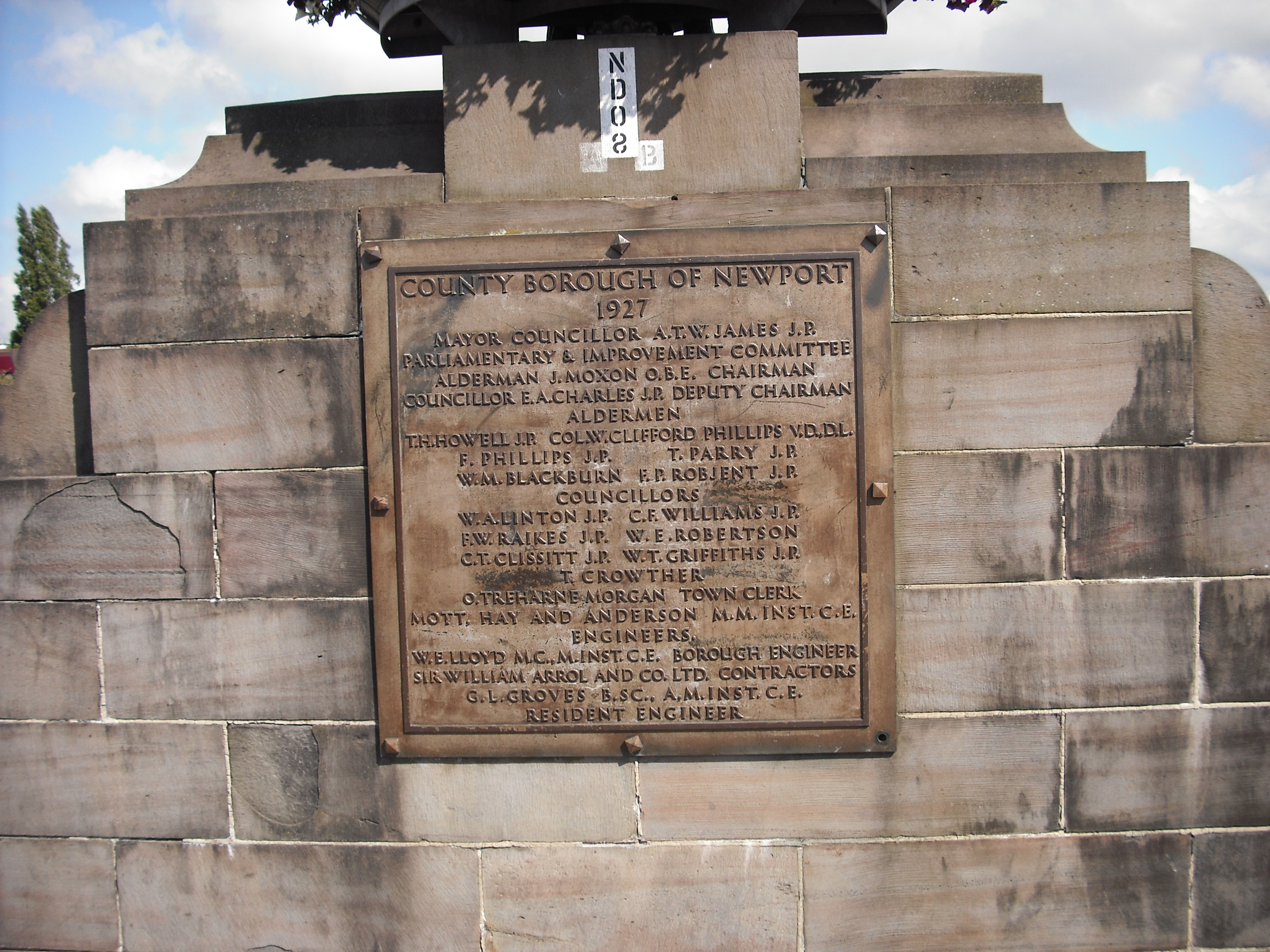
Foundation plaque, 1927, Newport Bridge, Newport

In 1911 the Town Council sought designs for a replacement bridge. In December 1923, a decision was made to proceed immediately with the construction of the new bridge, partly as a scheme to find work for the unemployed.

To best achieve this, a temporary wooden bridge was erected alongside it, and all power and gas lines were re-routed onto it. Even the town's tram lines and their accompanying overhead power system were moved over.

The old bridge was then demolished and the new one erected.

On 22 June 1927, the new bridge was complete and it was opened to traffic by the Transport Minister Wilfrid Ashley.

== The stone cherubs ==
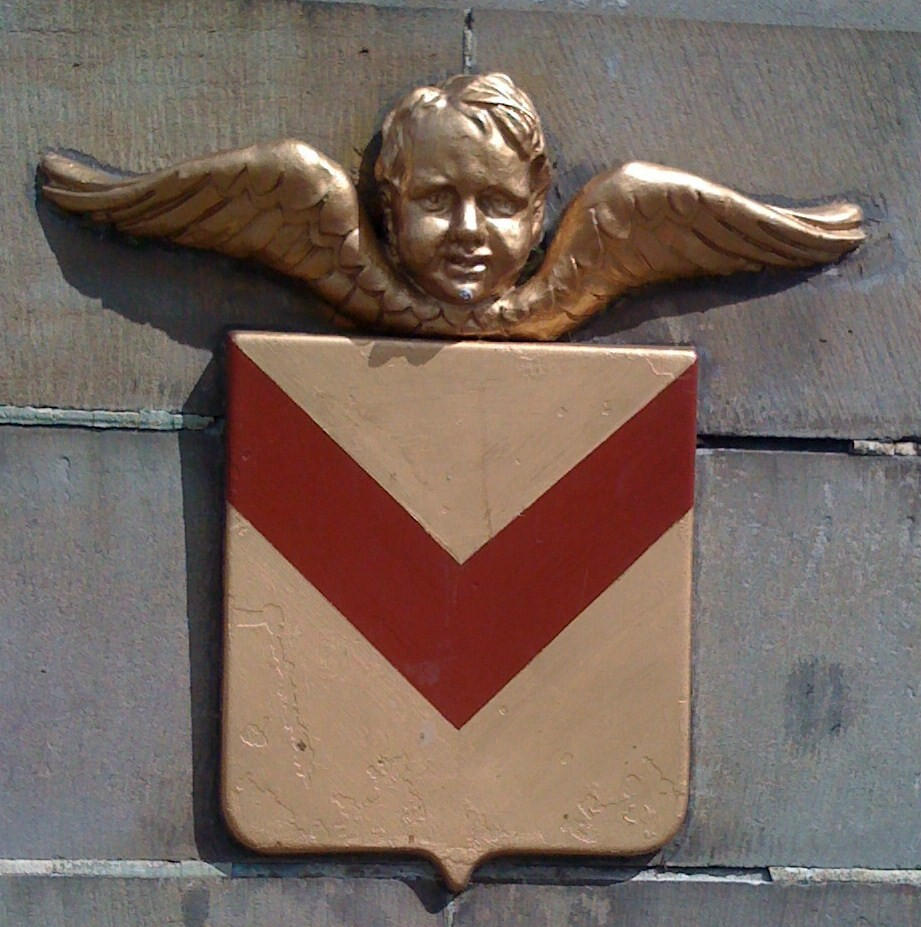
Cherub and shield on Newport Bridge

On four of its pillars the new bridge has a stone cherub, painted in gold, and shield, modelled after the coat of arms of Newport.

In 1994 John Squire, guitarist of The Stone Roses, designed the cover of the band's single "Love Spreads", basing it on a photograph of a stone cherub and shield on Newport Bridge. The song was the band's biggest selling single, reaching number 2 in the UK Singles Chart. The cherub design found its way onto many pieces of merchandise for Second Coming, the album from which "Love Spreads" was taken, and the design also features on the CD itself in monochrome.

== See also ==
- List of bridges in Wales
- Newport and Caerleon Bridges over Usk Act 1597
