= Mortmain and Charitable Uses Act 1888 =

Act of the Parliament of the United Kingdom

Mortmain and Charitable Uses Act 1888 (Note: Section 14.)
- Act of Parliament
- Parliament of the United Kingdom
- Long title: An Act to consolidate and amend the Law relating to Mortmain and to the disposition of Land for Charitable Uses.
- Citation: 51 & 52 Vict. c. 42
- Introduced by: Hardinge Giffard, 1st Baron Halsbury (Lords)
- Territorial extent: England and Wales (Note: Section 11.)

Dates
- Royal assent: 13 August 1888
- Commencement: 13 August 1888 (Note: The Acts of Parliament (Commencement) Act 1793.)
- Repealed: 29 July 1960
Other legislation
Amends	See § Repealed enactments
Repeals/revokes	See § Repealed enactments
Amended by	Settled Land Act 1925
Repealed by	Charities Act 1960

Status: Repealed

History of passage through Parliament

Records of Parliamentary debate relating to the statute from Hansard

Text of statute as originally enacted

The Mortmain and Charitable Uses Act 1888 (51 & 52 Vict. c. 42), also known as the Charitable Trusts Act 1888, was an act of the Parliament of the United Kingdom that consolidated enactments relating to charities in England and Wales.

== Passage ==
The Mortmain and Charitable Uses Bill had its first reading in the House of Lords on 17 February 1888, presented by the Lord Chancellor, Hardinge Giffard, 1st Baron Halsbury. The bill had its second reading in the House of Lords on 28 February 1888 and was committed to a committee of the whole house, which met on 6 March 1888 and reported on 8 March 1888, with amendments. The amended bill had its third reading in the House of Lords on 13 March 1888 and passed, without amendments.

The bill had its first reading in the House of Commons on 15 March 1888. The bill had its second reading in the House of Commons on 22 March 1888 and was committed to a committee of the whole house. The committee was discharged on 13 April 1888 and was committed to the Standing Committee on Law and Courts of Justice and Legal Procedure, which was appointed on 17 April 1888 and reported on 7 June 1888, with amendments to the long title of the bill. The amended bill was considered on 10 August 1888, with amendments. The amended bill had its third reading in the House of Commons on 10 August 1888 and passed, without amendments.

The amended bill was considered and agreed to by the House of Lords on 11 August 1888, with a consequential amendment, which was considered and agreed to by the House of Commons on 11 August 1888.

The bill was granted royal assent on 13 August 1888.

== Provisions ==
=== Repealed enactments ===
Section 13 of the act repealed 16 enactments, listed in the schedule to the act. Section 13 of the act also provided that the repeals would not affect anything done, any rights, obligations or liabilities accrued, or any legal proceedings made under the repealed enactments.

Citation	Short Title	Title	Extent of repeal
7 Edw. 1.	Statutum de Viris Religiosis	Statut' de Viris Religiosis.	The whole act.
13 Edw. 1. c. 32	Mortmain	Remedy in case of mortmain under judgments by collusion.	The whole chapter.
18 Ed. 3. st. 3. c. 3	Mortmain	Prosecutions against religious persons for purchasing lands in mortmain.	The whole chapter.
15 Ric. 2. c. 5	Mortmain Act 1391	St. 7 Edw. 1. de Religiosis. Converting land to a churchyard declared to be within that statute. Mortmain where lay is seised of lands to the use of spiritual persons. Mortmain to purchase lands in gilds, fraternities, offices, commonalties, or to their use.	The whole chapter.
23 Hen. 8. c. 10	Mortmain Act 1531	An Acte for certain ordinances in the Kinges Majesties dominion and principalitie of Wales.	The whole act.
43 Eliz. c. 4	Charitable Uses Act 1601	An Acte to redresse the misemployment of landes, goodes, and stockes of money heretofore given to charitable uses.	The whole act.
7 & 8 Will. 3. c. 37	Mortmain Act 1695	An Acte for the encouragement of charitable gifts and dispositions.	The whole act.
9 Geo. 2. c. 36	Charitable Uses Act 1735	An Act to restrain the disposition of lands whereby the same become unalienable.	The whole Act, except so much of section five as is unrepealed.
9 Geo. 4. c. 85	Lands Purchased for Charitable Purposes Act 1828	An Act for remedying a defect in the titles of lands purchased for charitable purposes.	The whole act.
24 & 25 Vict. c. 9	Charitable Uses Act 1861	An Act to amend the law relating to the conveyance of land for charitable uses.	The whole act.
25 & 26 Vict. c. 17	Charitable Uses Act 1862	An Act to extend the time for making enrolments under the Act passed in the last session of Parliament, intituled "An Act to amend the law relating to the conveyance of land for charitable uses, and to restrain the disposition," and "to explain and amend the said Act."	The whole act.
27 & 28 Vict. c. 13	Charities (Enrolment of Deeds) Act 1864	An Act to further extend the time for making enrolments under the Acts passed in the twenty-fourth year of the reign of Her present Majesty, intituled "An Act to amend the law relating to the conveyance of lands for charitable uses," and otherwise to amend the said Acts.	The whole act.
29 & 30 Vict. c. 57	Charitable Trusts Deeds Enrolment Act 1866	An Act to make further provision for the enrollment of certain deeds, assurances, and other instruments relating to charitable trusts.	The whole act.
31 & 32 Vict. c. 44	Building Sites for Religious and Other Purposes Act 1868	An Act for facilitating the acquisition and enjoyment of sites for buildings for religious, educational, literary, scientific, and other charitable purposes.	Sections one and two.
34 & 35 Vict. c. 13	Public Parks, Schools, and Museums Act 1871	An Act to facilitate gifts of land for public parks, schools, and museums.	The whole act.
35 & 36 Vict. c. 24	Charitable Trustees Incorporation Act 1872	An Act to facilitate the incorporation of trustees of charities for religious, educational, literary, scientific, and public charitable purposes, and the enrollment of certain charitable trust deeds.	Section thirteen.

== Subsequent developments ==
The act was described as a consolidation act.

The whole act was repealed by section 48, and the seventh schedule to, the Charities Act 1960 (8 & 9 Eliz. 2. c. 58), which came into force on 29 July 1960.
