= Bishops Act 1597 =

Act of the Parliament of England

- Act of Parliament
- Parliament of England
- Long title: An Acte concerninge the confirmacion & establishment of the Deprivacion of diverse Bishopps and Deanes in the begynning of her Majestyes Reigne.
- Citation: 39 Eliz. 1. c. 8
- Territorial extent: England and Wales

Dates
- Royal assent: 9 February 1598
- Commencement: 24 October 1597 (Note: The Acts of Parliament (Commencement) Act 1793.)
- Repealed: 28 July 1863

Other legislation
- Repealed by: Statute Law Revision Act 1863
- Relates to: Act of Supremacy 1558

Status: Repealed

Text of statute as originally enacted

The Bishops Act 1597 (39 Eliz. 1 c. 8) was an act of the Parliament of England which confirmed deprivation of bishops and deans.

== Provisions ==
The act confirmed deprivation of several bishops and deans, and the act forbade questioning the legality of their successor appointment.

== Subsequent developments ==
The whole act was repealed by section 1 of, and the schedule to, the Statute Law Revision Act 1863 (26 & 27 Vict. c. 125), which came into force on 28 July 1863.

== See also ==
- Act of Supremacy 1558
