= Tillage Act 1597 =

Act of the Parliament of England

- Act of Parliament
- Parliament of England
- Long title: An Acte for the mayntenaunce of Husbandrye and Tyllage.
- Citation: 39 Eliz. 1. c. 2
- Introduced by: Francis Bacon (Commons)
- Territorial extent: England and Wales

Dates
- Royal assent: 9 February 1598
- Commencement: 24 October 1597 (Note: Start of session.)
- Repealed: 28 July 1863

Other legislation
- Amended by: Continuance, etc. of Laws Act 1601
- Repealed by: Statute Law Revision Act 1863

Status: Repealed

Text of statute as originally enacted

The Tillage Act 1597 (39 Eliz. 1. c. 2) was an act of the Parliament of England passed during the reign of Elizabeth I.

Francis Bacon introduced the bill into the House of Commons on 5 November 1597. He criticised those lords who had converted land to pasture and he lamented the decay in tillage in the country. The act ordered that land that had been converted to pasture during Elizabeth's reign should revert to tillage and it also banned any further conversion of land to pasture. It applied to 25 counties.

In 1601 the act was due for renewal and was subject to debate. Sir Walter Raleigh opposed the act, declaring that the best policy would be to set corn free "and leave every man free, which is the desire of a true Englishman". Sir Robert Cecil, however, supported the act: "Whoever doth not maintain the plough, destroys the kingdom".

== Subsequent developments ==
The act was continued until the end of the next session by the Continuance, etc. of Laws Act 1601 (43 Eliz. 1. c. 9), which also amended the act not to extend to the County of Northumberland.

The whole act was repealed by section 1 of, and the schedule to, the Statute Law Revision Act 1863 (26 & 27 Vict. c. 125), which came into force on 28 July 1863.
