= Newport Technical Institute =

Building in Newport, Wales

Coordinates: 51.5906°N 2.9921°W

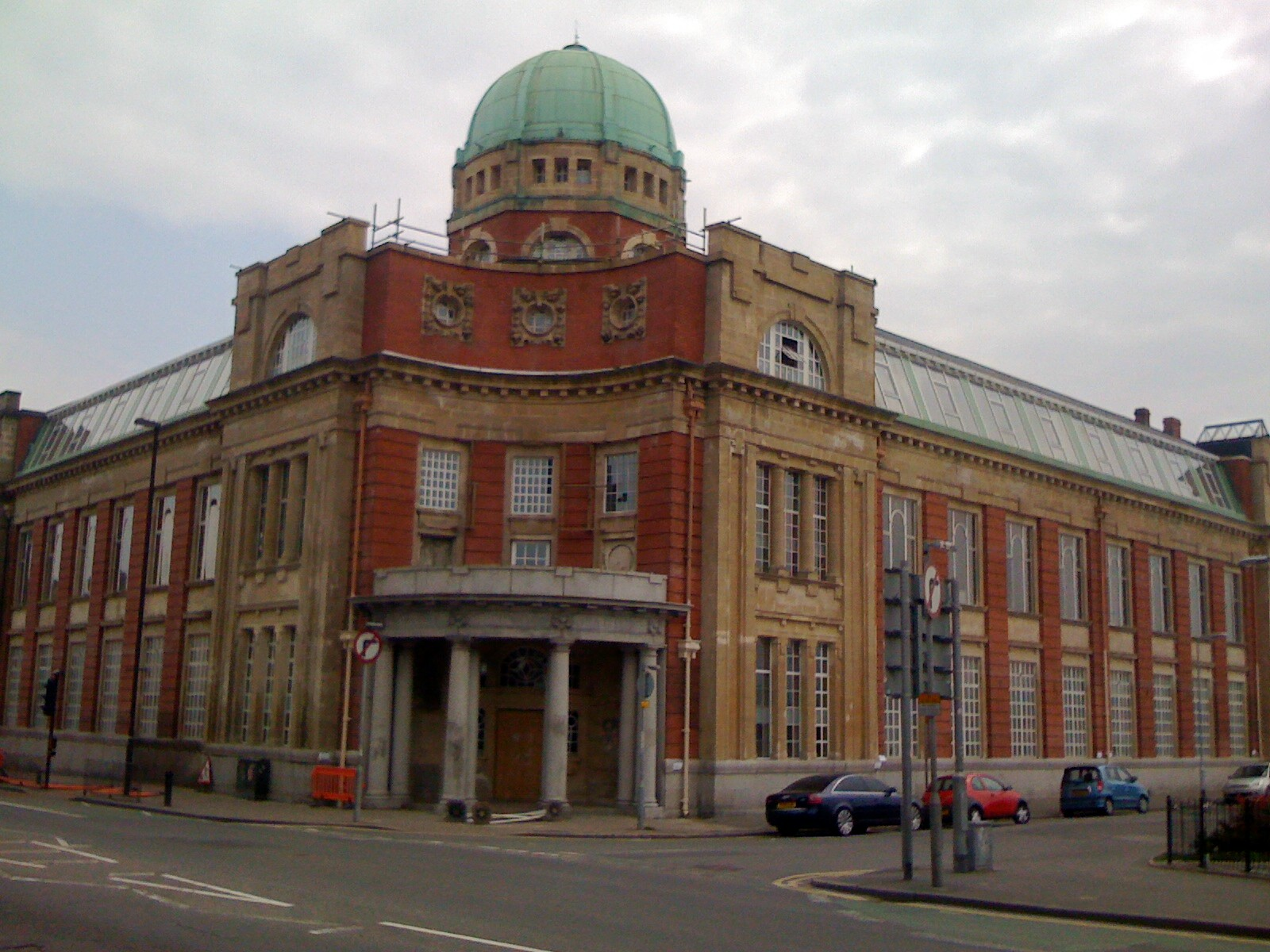
Newport Technical Institute, 2011

Newport Technical Institute is a Grade II-listed building in the city centre of Newport, Wales.

The red-brick building with a copper dome stands in Clarence Place on the east bank of the River Usk, close to Newport Bridge. It was built on land purchased from Lord Tredegar and opened in September 1910. Known locally as the former "Art College" or "School of Art", the Newport Technical Institute and its School of Art evolved from the Newport Mechanics Institute.

After the School of Art relocated to the University of Wales, Newport Caerleon campus, the building fell into serious disrepair. In 2008 redevelopment began to convert the building into apartments and was completed in 2012.
