= Vagabonds Act 1597 =

Act of the Parliament of England

- Act of Parliament
- Parliament of England
- Long title: An Act for punishment of Rogues, Vagabonds, and sturdie Beggers.
- Citation: 39 Eliz. 1. c. 4
- Introduced by: Sir Robert Wroth (Commons)
- Territorial extent: England and Wales

Dates
- Royal assent: 9 February 1598
- Commencement: 6 April 1597 (Note: Section 1. The Feast of Easter.)
- Repealed: 9 July 1714
Other legislation
Amended by	Vagabonds Act 1603; Continuance, etc. of Laws Act 1623; Continuance of Laws, etc. Act 1627
Repealed by	Vagrants Act 1713
Relates to	Vagabonds Act 1572; Poor Act 1575; Poor Relief Act 1597; Hospitals for the Poor Act 1597

Status: Repealed

Text of statute as originally enacted

Vagabonds Act 1603
- Act of Parliament
- Parliament of England
- Long title: An Acte for the Continuance and Explanation of the Statute made in the 39 yeere of our late Queene Elizabeth, intituled "An Acte for Punishmente of Rogues Vagaboundes and Sturdie Beggers."
- Citation: 1 Jas. 1. c. 7
- Territorial extent: England and Wales

Dates
- Royal assent: 7 July 1604
- Commencement: 19 March 1604 (Note: Start of session.)
- Repealed: 9 July 1714
Other legislation
Amends	Vagabonds Act 1597
Amended by	Continuance, etc. of Laws Act 1623; Continuance of Laws, etc. Act 1627
Repealed by	Hospitals for the Poor Act 1597; Vagrants Act 1713

Status: Repealed

Text of statute as originally enacted

The Vagabonds Act 1597 (39 Eliz. 1. c. 4) was an act of the Parliament of England, which aimed to address concerns of vagrancy.

== Background ==
The ninth Elizabethan parliament had opened on 24 October 1597, with Parliament concerned about the dearth of corn, high prices, rising homelessness, and "the lamentable cry of the poor, who are like to perish" causing considerable distress, rioting and even rebellion; with an estimated 10,000 vagabonds in London alone, and 2,000 more in Norwich; and despite local variations in provision, vagrancy continued to be a national problem.

Following the failed 1597 harvest, there was widespread suffering and hardship, with many thousands were made unemployed by the enclosures which compounded the effects of the famine. One Member of Parliament (MP), Sir Francis Hastings, called for 'vagabonds' to be arrested, whipped and returned to their place of origin where they would be set to work in a house of correction.

== Passage ==
The progenitor of the act was most likely the Secretary of State, Sir Robert Cecil, who wrote his policy in Notes for the Parliament on the basis of a speech to be made on November 5. His promotion of the bill, along with two other similar bills, was supported mainly by Puritans.

However, due to certain social measures contained in the bill, a majority of the gentry in the House of Commons rebelled against the provisions; one of those opposed was Sir Walter Raleigh.

On 22 November 1597, the three bills were recommended to the House by the Chairman of the Grand Committee, Sir Robert Wroth, and seconded by Henry Finch: both of whom were Puritan. In December, the bill had a second reading before it was passed onto the House of Lords where, as in the Commons, it caused considerable debate. The bill received many amendments, both in the Grand Committee and House of Lords.

However, the Houses of Parliament could not agree how the categories of prisoners were to be described, with the Commons rejecting the bill by 106–66. Under Elizabethan procedure, the Lords drafted a compromise bill which passed both houses with ease.

== Provisions ==
The act introduced penal transportation for the first time as a punishment and alternative to execution.

During the reign of Henry VIII, it has been estimated that 72,000 people were executed.

With the establishment of settlements in North America, an alternative practice (seemingly borrowed from Spain) began as a reprieve of the death sentence, should the condemned person consent to be transported to an American colony, and be entered into bond service. However, it is probable that this part of the legislation was never put into force. Another effect of the Act was to lessen the severity of a punishment meted out to strolling players imposed under a 1572 act wherein "all fencers, bearwards, common players of interludes, and minstrels (not belonging to any baron of this realm, or to any other honourable person of greater degree)," wandering abroad without the license of two justices at the least, were subject "to be grievously whipped and burned through the gristle of the right ear with a hot iron of the compass of an inch about."

== Subsequent developments ==
The Relief of the Parish Poor remained in force until the 20th century. The third act to pass was the Hospitals for the Poor Act 1597 (39 Eliz. 1. c. 5), which became the basis for the Victorian workhouse system; and another was the Act for "the punishment of rogues, vagabonds and sturdy beggars". Rogues who escaped were arrested, branded and then returned to the House of Correction until the governor could decide when to obtain their release. Since many vagabonds took refuge in these areas, the main change brought in by the act was clause 3, the stipulation that vagrants or 'sturdy beggars' should be sent back to their place of origin. They were viewed by Parliament essentially as being migrants and therefore should be returned from whence they came.

The act required every parish to keep a record of every resident, including potential vagrants, who might go wandering across the realm. Unfortunately most of this information was only available in the larger cities. The paucity of quality record-keeping meant it was difficult to interpret how population increases reflected upon rising vagrancy rates during 'The Dearth' of 1590s. The act insisted the "wandering" and "loitering" was designated into two social groups of unskilled poor and unemployed economic migrants: however as no person was forced to "wander" it was thus interpreted as falling hardest on the poorest.

These acts were lasting testaments to Elizabethan religious radicalism that were among the most profound of the many reforms of the period. (Note: for example, the Mayor of Exeter had to make provision for those sick from the plague in 1587, 1591, and 1598; and Winchester in 1593; Salisbury suffered similarly from an influx of population. In both 1591 and 1605 after the acts were passed the City Fathers had to raise Special Poor Rates.) The act's immediate future oversaw violent times, with riots and plague affecting London in 1592, and an armed uprising in Oxfordshire occurring in 1596.

The Queen's fears and apprehensions were exaggerated by the enclosure acts that drove sheep onto the land, and peasants off it, as described to her by John Manwood in his treatise A Brefe Collection of the Lawes of the Forest (1592); they circumscribed the royal prerogative. (Note: vividly portrayed in Shakespeare's fictional comedies As You Like It and Love's Labor's Lost.) The Midland counties of thick afforested areas, such as the Forest of Arden were more disorderly, unruly and more likely to have livestock than the lowland arable areas. The poor would "dwell in woods ...like drones devoted to thievery," whereas "the forests, if inclosed, would be more secure for travellers,...and more beneficial for the Commonwealth." The difference gave rise to David Underdown's 'chalk and cheese' description citing immigration, price instability, dearth, and social instability as main factors leading to vagabondage and vagrancy among the lower orders driving out by informal rough justice. The cow pasturage thus represented a border area with woodlands of lawlessness and violence. Marxist historians Christopher Hill and Sharp, have argued that the violence was symptomatic of organised angry resistance mobilised in the iron founding areas, turning out weaponry from secret 'hideaways'. They have contended that far from passive acceptance of their starving condition, the poor sought to fight back against the callous landlords. The foresters were "addicted to crime and violence - all rogues."

Irish vagrants travelled in bands like a circus, and often assumed the title "gypsies" which was affected. There is little evidence of gangs of aggressive beggars roaming Elizabethan England, except in as much as "gentlemen of the road" and other soubriquet are mentioned in Shakespeare's legendary works. Informative though it was, much of the literature was based on the romanticism of the Robin Hood, as the lawless vagabond and thief. In one clause beggars were punished for 'subtle crafts' proscribing palmistry, fortune-telling, minstrelsy or unlicensed acting, most often associated with illiterate itinerant communities. By contrast the English tended to travel in ones and twos frequenting along the way at familiar haunts, such as a refreshment house, barn, or lodging-house. No Gaming was allowed and the Innkeepers were expected to keep a good house. The Quarter Sessions were a binding cognizance against "harbouring rogues, vagabonds and others without passports."

Typically, young adults, predominantly men, either looked for work or engaged in petty crime. Officials prescribed that they "deserved to be whipped or stocked" as a punishment for transgressions. Those that were not punished were integrated into town life "to save the town harmless." Towns suffered from relatively high mortality rates, and so new 'blood' was always welcomed to boost numbers. By the Jacobean Parliament of 1610 it was noted that "thieves, rogues and beggars" had threatened local populations by coming out of the woods, from whence they had earlier taken refuge in times of The Dearth. The act also made those listed in several categories liable for impressment in the service of the fleet. Jacobean statute reversed the requirement to send people home, perhaps in recognition of a New World circumstance in which Transportation helped to satisfy demands for colonists. Indeed, Australian law has traced the origins of the commutation of labour to Macquarie Harbour down to the 1597 act and a Privy Council decision of 1602. When “lesser offenders adjudged by law to die” [to] be punished instead in a manner that will correct them “and yield a profitable service to the Commonwealth in parts abroad...”.

The act was continued until the end of first session of the next parliament by the Continuance, etc. of Laws Act 1601 (43 Eliz. 1. c. 9), the Continuance, etc. of Laws Act 1623 (21 Jas. 1. c. 28) and the Continuance of Laws, etc. Act 1627 (3 Cha. 1 . c. 5).

The whole act was repealed by section 28 of the Vagrants Act 1713 (13 Ann. c. 26), which came into force on 16 February 1714.

== Bibliography ==
- Statutes of the Realm, 39 Eliz. c. 4, clause III.
- Beier, A. L. Masterless Men: The Vagrancy Problem in England, 1560-1640. pp. 36–7, 39, 72.
- Slack, Paul A. "Vagrants and Vagrancy in England, 1598-1664". Economic History Society: 360–378.
- Sharp, Buchanan (1980). In Contempt of All Authority: Rural Artisans and Riot in the West of England, 1586-1660. Berkeley: University of California Press.
