= Simony Act 1713 =

Act of the Parliament of Great Britain

Simony Act 1713 (Note: The citation of this act by this short title was authorised by section 1 of, and the first schedule to, the Short Titles Act 1896. Due to the repeal of those provisions it is now authorised by section 19(2) of the Interpretation Act 1978.)
- Act of Parliament
- Parliament of Great Britain
- Long title: An Act for the better Maintenance of Curates within the Church of England within the Church of England, and for preventing any Ecclesiastical Persons from buying the next Avoidance of any Church Preferment. (Note: These words are printed against this act in the second column of the first schedule to the Short Titles Act 1896, which is headed "Title".)
- Citation: 13 Ann. c. 11 (Note: This is the citation in The Statutes of the Realm.); 12 Ann. St. 2. c. 12 (Note: This is the citation in The Statutes at Large.)
- Territorial extent: Great Britain

Dates
- Royal assent: 9 July 1714
- Commencement: 29 September 1714 (Note: Section 1.)
- Repealed: 27 July 1971

Other legislation
- Amended by: Residence on Benefices, etc. (England) Act 1817; Statute Law Revision Act 1948
- Repealed by: Statute Law (Repeals) Act 1971

Status: Repealed

Text of statute as originally enacted

The Simony Act 1713 (13 Ann. c. 11) was an act of the Parliament of Great Britain.

== Subsequent developments ==
So much of the act "as relates to spiritual persons holding of farms, and to leases of benefices and livings, and to buying and selling, and to residence of spiritual persons on their benefices" was repealed by section 1 of the Residence on Benefices, etc. (England) Act 1817 (57 Geo. 3. c. 99), which came into force on 10 July 1817.

In the title, the words "for the better" to "England and, and the words of commencement in section 2 of the act, were repealed by section 1 of, and schedule 1 to, the Statute Law Revision Act 1948 (11 & 12 Geo. 6. c. 62), which came into force on 30 July 1948. The whole act was repealed by section 1 of, and the part II of the schedule to, the Statute Law (Repeals) Act 1971, which came into force on 27 July 1971.
