= Poor Relief Act 1597 =

Act of the Parliament of England

- Act of Parliament
- Parliament of England
- Long title: An Act for the Relief of the Poor.
- Citation: 39 Eliz. 1. c. 3
- Territorial extent: England and Wales

Dates
- Royal assent: 9 February 1598
- Commencement: 24 October 1597 (Note: Start of session.)
- Repealed: 28 July 1863

Other legislation
- Amended by: Poor Relief Act 1601; Continuance, etc. of Laws Act 1601
- Repealed by: Statute Law Revision Act 1863
- Relates to: Vagabonds Act 1597; Hospitals for the Poor Act 1597

Status: Repealed

Text of statute as originally enacted

The Poor Relief Act 1597 (39 Eliz. 1. c. 3) or the Act for the Relief of the Poor 1597 was an act of the Parliament of England. The act provided the first complete code of poor relief and was later amended by the Poor Relief Act 1601 (43 Eliz. 1. c. 2), which formed the basis of poor relief for the next two centuries.

The act established overseers of the poor.

== Subsequent developments ==
The act was continued until the end of the next session by section 3 of the Continuance, etc. of Laws Act 1601 (43 Eliz. 1. c. 9), unless an act was passed in the present session to replace it.

The whole act was repealed by section 1 of, and the schedule to, the Statute Law Revision Act 1863 (26 & 27 Vict. c. 125), which came into force on 28 July 1863.
