= Hospitals for the Poor Act 1597 =

Act of the Parliament of England

Hospitals for the Poor Act 1597 (Note: The citation of this act by this short title was authorised by section 5 of, and the second schedule to, the Statute Law Revision Act 1948. Due to the repeal of those provisions, it is now authorised by section 19(2) of the Interpretation Act 1978.)
- Act of Parliament
- Parliament of England
- Long title: An Acte for erecting of Hospitalles or abiding and working Howses for the Poore. (Note: These words are printed against this act in the second column of the second schedule to the Statute Law Revision Act 1948, which is headed "Title".) (Note: The title has also been rendered as "An Act for erecting of hospitals or abiding and working houses for the poor".)
- Citation: 39 Eliz. 1. c. 5
- Territorial extent: England and Wales

Dates
- Royal assent: 9 February 1598
- Commencement: 24 October 1597 (Note: Start of session.)
- Repealed: 1 January 1961
Other legislation
Amends	Continuance, etc. of Laws Act 1592
Amended by	Hospitals Act 1623
Repealed by	Charities Act 1960
Relates to	Disabled Soldiers Act 1592; Poor Relief Act 1597; Vagabonds Act 1597

Status: Repealed

Text of statute as originally enacted

The Hospitals for the Poor Act 1597 (39 Eliz. 1. c. 5) was an act of the Parliament of England. It was enacted during the reign of Elizabeth I and remained in force until the 20th century.

The Disabled Soldiers Act 1592 (35 Eliz. 1. c. 4) had permitted the bequest of lands and buildings to establish "houses of correction or abiding-houses" for the poor or for maimed soldiers, but as it had not been legally possible to establish a hospital without a specific royal grant, that act had had limited effect. As such, the act was enacted, allowing any person wishing to establish a foundation to create it by deed at the High Court of Chancery; such foundations would be permanent. However, a minimum endowment was required, sufficient to produce an income of £10 per annum.

== Subsequent developments ==
Hospitals Act 1623
- Act of Parliament
- Parliament of England
- Long title: An Act for the reviving and making perpetual of one act made in the nine and thirtieth year of the late Queen Elizabeth, intituled, "An Act for erecting of hospitals, and abiding and working houses for the poor."
- Citation: 21 Jas. 1. c. 1
- Territorial extent: England and Wales

Dates
- Royal assent: 29 May 1624
- Commencement: 12 February 1624 (Note: Start of session.)
- Repealed: 30 July 1948
Other legislation
Amends	Hospitals for the Poor Act 1597
Repealed by	Statute Law Revision Act 1948

Status: Repealed

Text of statute as originally enacted

The act was initially to apply for twenty years. But it was later revived and made perpetual by the Hospitals Act 1623 (21 Jas. 1. c. 1).

The whole act was repealed by section 39(1) of, and schedule 5 to, the Charities Act 1960 (8 & 9 Eliz. 2. c. 58), which came into force on 1 January 1961.
