= List of acts of the Parliament of England from 1597 =

This is a list of acts of the Parliament of England for the year 1597.

For acts passed during the period 1707–1800, see the list of acts of the Parliament of Great Britain. See also the list of acts of the Parliament of Scotland, and the list of acts of the Parliament of Ireland.

For acts passed from 1801 onwards, see the list of acts of the Parliament of the United Kingdom. For acts of the devolved parliaments and assemblies in the United Kingdom, see the list of acts of the Scottish Parliament, the list of acts of the Northern Ireland Assembly, and the list of acts and measures of Senedd Cymru; see also the list of acts of the Parliament of Northern Ireland.

For medieval statutes, etc. that are not considered to be acts of Parliament, see the list of English statutes.

See also the List of ordinances and acts of the Parliament of England, 1642–1660 for ordinances and acts passed by the Long Parliament and other bodies without royal assent, and which were not considered to be valid legislation following the Restoration in 1660.

The number shown after each act's title is its chapter number. Acts are cited using this number, preceded by the years of the reign during which the relevant parliamentary session was held; thus the Union with Ireland Act 1800 is cited as "39 & 40 Geo. 3. c. 67", meaning the 67th act passed during the session that started in the 39th year of the reign of George III and which finished in the 40th year of that reign. The modern convention is to use Arabic numerals in citations (thus "41 Geo. 3" rather than "41 Geo. III"). Acts of the last session of the Parliament of Great Britain and the first session of the Parliament of the United Kingdom are both cited as "41 Geo. 3".

Acts passed by the Parliament of England did not have a short title; however, some of these acts have subsequently been given a short title by acts of the Parliament of the United Kingdom, such as the Short Titles Act 1896 (59 & 60 Vict. c. 14).

Acts passed by the Parliament of England were deemed to have come into effect on the first day of the session in which they were passed. Because of this, the years given in the list below may in fact be the year before a particular act was passed.

== 39 Eliz. 1 ==
The 9th Parliament of Queen Elizabeth I, which met from 24 October 1597 until 9 February 1598.

This session was traditionally cited as 39 Eliz., 39 Elz., 39 El., 39 & 40 Eliz. 1, 39 & 40 Eliz. or 39 & 40 Elz.

=== Public acts ===
Short title	Citation	Royal assent
Long title
Houses of Husbandry Act 1597 (repealed)	39 Eliz. 1. c. 1	9 February 1598
An Acte against the decaying of Townes & Howses of Husbandry. (Repealed by Statute Law Revision Act 1863 (26 & 27 Vict. c. 125))
Tillage Act 1597 (repealed)	39 Eliz. 1. c. 2	9 February 1598
An Acte for the mayntenaunce of Husbnadrye and Tyllage. (Repealed by Statute Law Revision Act 1863 (26 & 27 Vict. c. 125))
Poor Relief Act 1597 (repealed)	39 Eliz. 1. c. 3	9 February 1598
An Acte for the Reliefe of the Poore. (Repealed by Statute Law Revision Act 1863 (26 & 27 Vict. c. 125))
Vagabonds Act 1597 (repealed)	39 Eliz. 1. c. 4	9 February 1598
An Acte for punishment of Rogues, Vagabondes, & Sturdie Begghers. (Repealed by Vagrants Act 1713 (13 Ann. c. 26))
Hospitals for the Poor Act 1597 (repealed)	39 Eliz. 1. c. 5	9 February 1598
An Acte for erecting of Hospitalles or abiding and working Howses for the Poore. (Repealed by Charities Act 1960 (8 & 9 Eliz. 2. c. 58))
Charitable Trusts Act 1597 (repealed)	39 Eliz. 1. c. 6	9 February 1598
An Acte to reforme Deceiptes and Breaches of Truste towchinge Landes given to charitable Uses. (Repealed by Continuance of Laws, etc. Act 1601 (43 Eliz. 1. c. 9))
Crown Debts Act 1597 (repealed)	39 Eliz. 1. c. 7	9 February 1598
An Acte for the more speedye payment of the Quenes Majestues Debts and for the better explanacion of the Acte made in the thirteenth yeare of the Quenes Majesty, intituled "An Acte to make the Landes, Tenementes, Goodes and Chattells of Tellors Receavors &c. lyable to the payment of theire Debtes. (Repealed by Statute Law Revision Act 1863 (26 & 27 Vict. c. 125))
Bishops Act 1597 (repealed)	39 Eliz. 1. c. 8	9 February 1598
An Acte concerninge the confirmacion & establishment of the Deprivacion of diverse Bishopps and Deanes in the begynning of her Majestyes Reigne. (Repealed by Statute Law Revision Act 1863 (26 & 27 Vict. c. 125))
Abduction Act 1597 (repealed)	39 Eliz. 1. c. 9	9 February 1598
An Acte for the takinge awaye of Cleargie from Offendors against a certayne Statute made in the thirde yere of the Reigne of Kinge Henry the Seaventhe (Note: Abduction of Women Act 1487 (3 Hen. 7. c. 2)) concernynge the taking awaye of Women against theire Willes unlawfully. (Repealed by Offences Against the Person Act 1828 (9 Geo. 4. c. 31) and for India by Criminal Law (India) Act 1828 (9 Geo. 4. c. 74))
Navigation Act 1597 (repealed)	39 Eliz. 1. c. 10	9 February 1598
An Acte for the increase of Maryners and the mayntenance of the Navigacion, repealinge a former Acte made in the xxiijth yere of her Majesties Reigne (Note: Navigation Act 1580 (23 Eliz. 1. c. 7)) bearynge the same Tytle. (Repealed by Repeal of Acts Concerning Importation Act 1822 (3 Geo. 4. c. 41))
Dyeing of Cloth Act 1597 (repealed)	39 Eliz. 1. c. 11	9 February 1598
An Acte for the better execucion of the Statute made in the xxiijth yere of the Quenes Majestyes Reigne (Note: Dyeing of Cloth Act 1580 (23 Eliz. 1. c. 9)) for the abolishing of Logwood als Blockwood in the dyenge of Clothe Woole or Yearne. (Repealed by Statute Law Revision Act 1863 (26 & 27 Vict. c. 125))
Labourers Act 1597 (repealed)	39 Eliz. 1. c. 12	9 February 1598
An Acte for the eplanacion of the Statute made in the fyfte yere of her Majesties Reigne (Note: Statute of Artificers 1562 (5 Eliz. 1. c. 4)) concernynge Labourers. (Repealed by Statute Law Revision Act 1863 (26 & 27 Vict. c. 125))
Fustians Act 1597 (repealed)	39 Eliz. 1. c. 13	9 February 1598
An Explanacion of an Acte made in the eleventhe yere of Kyng Henry the seventh (Note: Fustians Act 1495 (11 Hen. 7. c. 27)) for Fustians. (Repealed by Statute Law Revision Act 1863 (26 & 27 Vict. c. 125))
Importation Act 1597 (repealed)	39 Eliz. 1. c. 14	9 February 1598
An Acte prohibitinge the bringinge into this Realme of anye forreynge Cardes for Wooll. (Repealed by Statute Law Revision Act 1863 (26 & 27 Vict. c. 125))
Robbery Act 1597 (repealed)	39 Eliz. 1. c. 15	9 February 1598
An Acte that no person robbinge any Howse in the daie tyme althoughe no person be therein shalbe admytted to have the benefite of his Clargie. (Repealed for England and Wales by Criminal Statutes Repeal Act 1827 (7 & 8 Geo. 4. c. 27) and for India by Criminal Law (India) Act 1828 (9 Geo. 4. c. 74))
Malt Act 1597 (repealed)	39 Eliz. 1. c. 16	9 February 1598
An Acte to restrayne the excessive makinge of Maulte. (Repealed by Malt Act 1697 (9 Will. 3. c. 22))
Vagabonds (No. 2) Act 1597 (repealed)	39 Eliz. 1. c. 17	9 February 1598
An Acte against lewde and wanderinge Persons pretending themselves to be Souldiers or Mariners. (Repealed by Repeal of 39 Eliz. 1. c. 17 Act 1812 (52 Geo. 3. c. 31))
Continuance, etc. of Laws Act 1597 (repealed)	39 Eliz. 1. c. 18	9 February 1598
An Acte for the revyvinge contynewance explancion perfectinge and repealing of divers Statutes. (Repealed by Statute Law Revision Act 1863 (26 & 27 Vict. c. 125))
Highways Act 1597 (repealed)	39 Eliz. 1. c. 19	9 February 1598
An Acte for Amendment of Highe Waies in Sussex Surrey & Kente. (Repealed by Highways (No. 2) Act 1766 (7 Geo. 3. c. 42))
Cloth Act 1597 (repealed)	39 Eliz. 1. c. 20	9 February 1598
An Acte against the deceiptfull stretchinge & taynteringe of Northerne Clothe. (Repealed by Woollen Manufacture Act 1809 (49 Geo. 3. c. 109) and City of London Courts of Justice Act 1815 (55 Geo. 3. c. xciii))
Disabled Soldiers Act 1597 (repealed)	39 Eliz. 1. c. 21	9 February 1598
An Acte for the further contynewaunce and explanacion of an Acte for the necessary relyef of Souldiours & Maryners made in the xxxvth yere of the Quenes Majestyes Reigne that nowe is. (Note: Disabled Soldiers Act 1592 (35 Eliz. 1. c. 4)) (Repealed by Disabled Soldiers Act 1601 (43 Eliz. 1. c. 3))
See of Norwich Act 1597	39 Eliz. 1. c. 22	9 February 1598
An Acte for the establishinge of the Bishopricke of Norwich and the Possession of the same againste a certen pretended concealed Title made thereunto.
Newport and Caerleon Bridges over Usk Act 1597 (repealed)	39 Eliz. 1. c. 23	9 February 1598
An Acte for the pepayring of the Bridges of Newporte and Carlion in the Countye of Monemothe. (Repealed by Statute Law Revision Act 1948 (11 & 12 Geo. 6. c. 62))
Bridge over Wye near Ross (Herefordshire) Act 1597 (repealed)	39 Eliz. 1. c. 24	9 February 1598
An Acte for the erectinge and buyldinge of a Bridge over the Ryver of Wye at Wilton upon Wye nere the Towne of Rosse in the Countye of Hereford. (Repealed by Statute Law Revision Act 1948 (11 & 12 Geo. 6. c. 62))
Hundred of Benhurst (Buckinghamshire) Hue and Cry Act 1597 (repealed)	39 Eliz. 1. c. 25	9 February 1598
An Acte for the enlarging of the Statute made for followinge Hue and Cry in the xxvijth yeare of her Majesties Raigne, (Note: Hue and Cry Act 1584 (27 Eliz. 1. c. 13)) in some sort to releive the Inhabitantes of the small Hundred of Beynershe als Benherst in cases where they are in noe voluntarye default and yet are or shalbe charged by the same statute and by the two auncient statutes, the one made in the xiijth yeare of Kinge Edwward the Fyrste, (Note: Statutum Wynton̄ (13 Edw. 1. St. 2)) thother in the xxviijth yeare of Kinge Edward the Thirde (Note: 28 Edw. 3. c. 11) for repressing of Robberies. (Repealed by Statute Law Revision Act 1948 (11 & 12 Geo. 6. c. 62))
Taxation Act 1597 (repealed)	39 Eliz. 1. c. 26	9 February 1598
An Acte for the Confirmation of the Subsidies granted by the Cleargie. (Repealed by Statute Law Revision Act 1863 (26 & 27 Vict. c. 125))
Taxation (No. 2) Act 1597 (repealed)	39 Eliz. 1. c. 27	9 February 1598
An Acte for the Graunte of Three Subsidies and Sixe Fiftenes and Tenthes. (Repealed by Statute Law Revision Act 1863 (26 & 27 Vict. c. 125))
Act of General Pardon 1597 (repealed)	39 Eliz. 1. c. 28	9 February 1598
An Acte for the Quenes Majesties most gratiouse generall and free Pardon. (Repealed by Statute Law Revision Act 1863 (26 & 27 Vict. c. 125))

=== Private acts ===
Short title	Citation	Royal assent
Long title
Kirkham's Estate Act 1597	39 Eliz. 1. c. 1 Pr.	9 February 1598
An Acte concerning a Lease of great yearly valew procured to be passed from her Majesty by Willam Kirkeham the younger.
Lord Mountjoy's Estate Act 1597	39 Eliz. 1. c. 2 Pr.	9 February 1598
An Acte that the Lorde Mountjoy may dispose of his Landes whereof he ys Tenant in tayle as other Tenantes in tayle by the Lawes and Statutes of this Realme maye doe; a private Statute made in the xxvijth yeare of H. 8. (Note: Partition of Lands between the heirs of Lord Broke Act 1535 (27 Hen. 8. c. 44)) to the contrarie notwithstandinge.
Queen Elizabeth's Hospital Act 1597	39 Eliz. 1. c. 3 Pr.	9 February 1598
An Act for the establishinge of the Hospitall of Queene Elizabeth in Bristoll and for the relieffe of the Orphans and Poore there.
Cobham College Act 1597	39 Eliz. 1. c. 4 Pr.	9 February 1598
An Acte for the establishment of the new Colledge of the Poore at Cobham in the Countie of Kente.
Earl of Leicester's Hospital Act 1597	39 Eliz. 1. c. 5 Pr.	9 February 1598
An Acte for the Confirmacion & better Assuraunce and conveyaunce of certeine Mannors Landes Tenements and Heredytamentes given and intended to an Hospytall or Measondieu in Warwicke fownded and established by the late Earle of Leycester.
Naturalization of Baskervile, Lewkenor, Hill, Heather, Bemys and Sheppey.	39 Eliz. 1. c. 6 Pr.	9 February 1598
An Acte for the naturalizeng of certen Englishemens Children and other borne beyonde the Seaes.
Sandys' Estate Act 1597	39 Eliz. 1. c. 7 Pr.	9 February 1598
An Acte for Confirmacion of the Joincture of Christian Lady Sandys.
Wantage Town Lands Act 1597	39 Eliz. 1. c. 8 Pr.	9 February 1598
An Acte for establishynge the Townelandes of Wantinge in the Cowntie of Berk to the reliefe of the Poore Amendment of High Waies and maynteynynge a Scoolemaster within the saide Towne.
Hatche's Estate Act 1597	39 Eliz. 1. c. 9 Pr.	9 February 1598
An Acte of Parlament for Arthure Hatche her Majesties Warde for the enjoyinge of the Rectorie and Parsonage of Southmolton in the Countie of Devon for certaine Yeares reservinge the usuall Rente.
Varney's Estate Act 1597	39 Eliz. 1. c. 10 Pr.	9 February 1598
An Acte for the Confyrmacion of the Joynture of the Ladie Varnmey Wiefe of Sir Edmunde Varney Knight.
Staines Bridge and Egham Causeway Act 1597	39 Eliz. 1. c. 11 Pr.	9 February 1598
An Acte for the better maynetenance and well keepinge of Stanes Bridge and Egham Cawsey beinge the Highe Waye from London unto the West partes of England.
Bedford's Estate Act 1597	39 Eliz. 1. c. 12 Pr.	9 February 1598
An Acte for establishinge of the Landes given by John Bedfordes Will to the perpetuall repaier and amendment of the Highe waies at Ailesburie in the Countye of Buckingham accordinge to the saide Will.
Sevenoaks School Act 1597	39 Eliz. 1. c. 13 Pr.	9 February 1598
An Acte concerning the Schoole at Sevenake.
Unton's Estate Act 1597	39 Eliz. 1. c. 14 Pr.	9 February 1598
An Acte for establishinge the Possessions late of Sir Henry Unton Knight decessed, and for the payment of his Debtes.
Pope's Estate Act 1597	39 Eliz. 1. c. 15 Pr.	9 February 1598
An Acte for establishing a Joincture to Anne Lady Wentworth now Wife of Willyam Pope Esquier & for the better enabling of the sayde Willyam Pope to sell certayne of his Landes for the payment of his Debtes.

=== Sources ===
- Raithby, John, ed. (1963) [1819]. "39° Eliz.". Statutes of the Realm. Vol. 4 Part 2: The Statutes of Queen Elizabeth (An. 28-43) and of King James (1586–1623). London: Dawsons. pp. 889–957 – via HathiTrust.
- Raithby, John, ed. (1963) [1819]. "39° Eliz.". Statutes of the Realm. Vol. 4 Part 2: The Statutes of Queen Elizabeth (An. 28-43) and of King James (1586–1623). London: Dawsons. p. 889-957 – via Google Books.
- Raithby, John, ed. (1963) [1819]. "39° Eliz.". Statutes of the Realm. Vol. 4 Part 2: The Statutes of Queen Elizabeth (An. 28-43) and of King James (1586–1623). London: Dawsons. p. 889-957 – via Internet Archive.
- Pickering, Danby, ed. (1763). "Anno tricesimo nono Elizabetheæ". The Statutes at Large. Vol. 7: From the Thirty-ninth Year of Q. Elizabeth to the Twelfth Year of K. Charles. Inclusive. Cambridge: Joseph Bentham. pp. 1–29 – via Internet Archive.
- Journal of the House of Commons. Vol. 1 – 1547-1629. His Majesty's Stationery Office. 1802 – via British History Online.
- Journal of the House of Lords. Vol. 2: 1578-1614. London: His Majesty's Stationery Office. 1830 – via British History Online.
- Chronological Table of and Index to the Statutes. Vol. 1: To the End of the Session 59 Vict. Sess. 2 (1895) (13th ed.). London: Her Majesty's Stationery Office. 1896. pp. 63–64 – via Google Books.
- Chronological Table of the Statutes: Covering the Period from 1235 to the End of 1971. London: Her Majesty's Stationery Office. 1972. p. 61. ISBN 978-0-11-840096-1 – via Google Books.
- "Chronological Tables of the Private and Personal Acts: Part 1 (1539–1601)". legislation.gov.uk. The National Archives.

== See also ==
- List of acts of the Parliament of England
