= Newport and Caerleon Bridges over Usk Act 1597 =

Act of the Parliament of England

- Act of Parliament
- Parliament of England
- Long title: An Acte for the pepayring of the Bridges of Newporte and Carlion in the Countye of Monemothe.
- Citation: 39 Eliz. 1. c. 23
- Territorial extent: England and Wales

Dates
- Royal assent: 9 February 1598
- Commencement: 24 October 1597 (Note: Start of Session.)
- Repealed: 30 July 1948

Other legislation
- Repealed by: Statute Law Revision Act 1948
- Relates to: Bridges Act 1530

Status: Repealed

Text of statute as originally enacted

The Newport and Caerleon Bridges over Usk Act 1597 (39 Eliz. 1. c. 23) was an act of the Parliament of England.

== Text ==
At the Parliament begun and holden at Westminster the four and twentieth Day of October in the nine and thirtieth Year of the Reign of our most gracious Sovereign Lady Elizabeth, by the Grace of God, of England, France and Ireland, Queen, Defender of the Faith, &c. and there continued until the Dissolution thereof, being the ninth of February next following, one thousand five hundred ninety-seven: To the high Pleasure of Almighty God, and the Weal publick of this Realm, were enacted as followeth.

The Inhabitants of the County of Monmouth shall stand chargeable for the Making and repairing of Newport and Carlion Bridges over the River of Usk, as need shall require: And such Order shall be observed for the Assessment, Gathering and Imployment of the Money thereupon to be spent, as is appointed by the Statute of 22 H. 8. c. 5. But no Town Corporate shall be chargeable to be contributory thereunto, which is bound by any Law to make or repair any Bridge over any main River.

== Subsequent developments ==
The whole act was repealed by section 1 of, and the first schedule to, the Statute Law Revision Act 1948 (11 & 12 Geo. 6. c. 62), which came into force on 30 July 1948.
