= Coat of arms of Newport =

- Armiger: Newport City Council
- Adopted: 1835 (unofficial) 1929 (official) Supporters added 1958
- Shield: Or, a chevron reversed Gules, the shield ensigned by a cherub proper
- Supporters: Dexter a winged sea lion Or and on the sinister a sea dragon Gules, the nether parts of both proper, finned Or
- Motto: TERRA MARIQUE
- Use: Civic purposes and in particular by the Mayor of Newport.

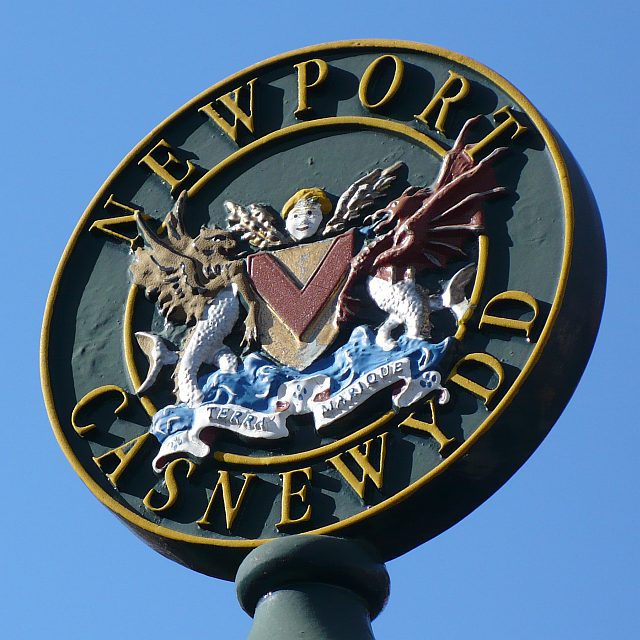
The coat of arms as seen on a sign at Stow Hill, Newport.

The coat of arms of Newport is the heraldic emblem of the city of Newport, South Wales. Also known as the Civic Badge, it has been borne by the present Newport City Council since 24 July 1996 following the municipal reorganisation in April that year.

== Timeline ==
Official usage of the Arms was granted to the Newport County Borough Council 17 April 1929, although the arms were unofficially in use before that date. Usage of the winged sea lion and winged sea dragon supporters was granted 7 May 1958. The subsequent Newport Borough Council used the arms from 1974 to 1996.

== Symbolism ==
The coat of arms is unusual for two reasons. Firstly, the cherub above the shield and secondly, Newport was the first authority to use the winged sea lion which has rare heraldic usage.

Shield

The shield is that of the Staffords, Earls and Dukes of Buckingham, Lords of the Manor of Newport in the 14th and 15th centuries, but the reversed chevron marks the difference between these Borough Arms and those of the family.

Supporters

The winged sea lion and winged sea dragon represent strength on land, sea and in the air.

Motto

The motto Terra Marique was adopted at the same time as the supporters and means 'By land and sea', in reference to Newport's position as a port.

== Derivations ==
The current Newport City Council logo features the winged sea lion derived from the coat of arms.

A feature of the 1927 Newport Bridge is the four plaques showing the cherub over the shield but omitting the other detail of the coat of arms.

Newport Rugby Football Club use a variant of the cherub and shield as their club crest and Newport County football Club use a variant of the shield in their club crest.

== The Stone Roses ==
In 1994 John Squire, guitarist of The Stone Roses designed the cover of their hit single Love Spreads based on a photograph of a stone cherub and shield on Newport Bridge. The song was the band's biggest selling single, reaching number 2 in the UK charts. The cherub design was found on many pieces of Second Coming merchandise, the album from which Love Spreads is taken.

== Gallery ==
The shield of Newport

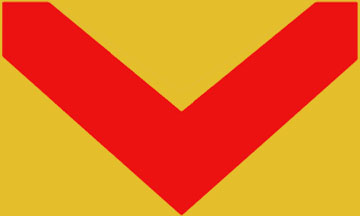
Theoretical heraldic banner of Newport

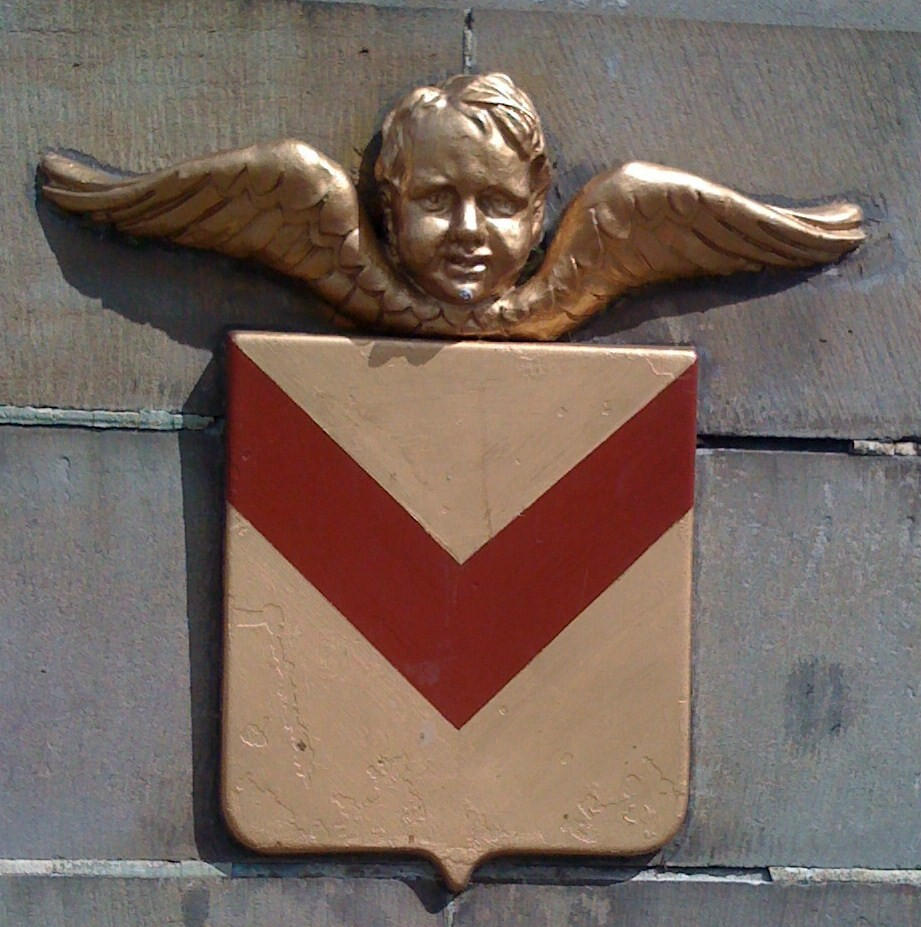
Cherub and shield on Newport Bridge

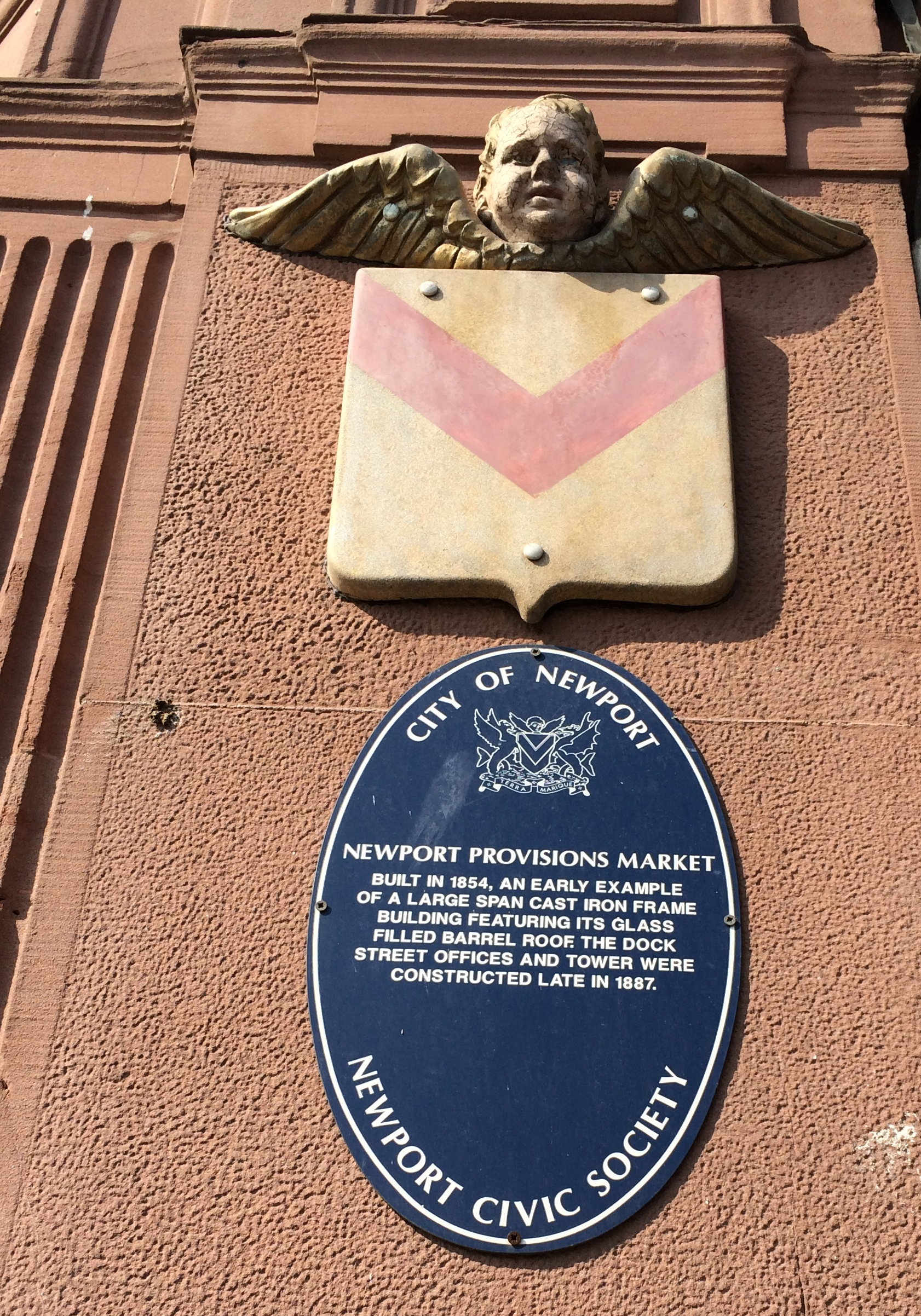
Cherub and shield on Newport Market, Upper Dock Street entrance

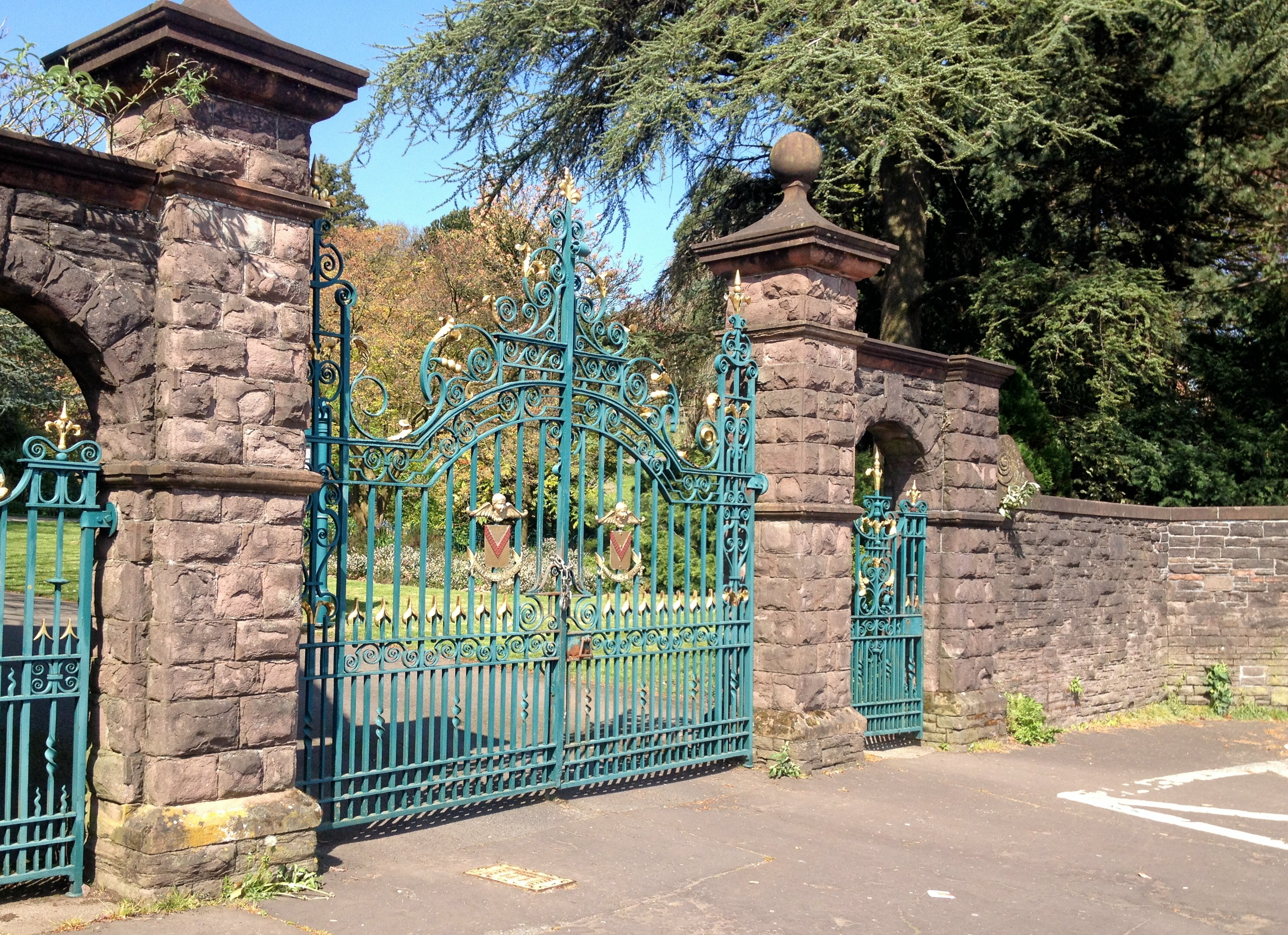
Belle Vue Park gates, Cardiff Road, Newport
