= List of acts of the Parliament of England from 1601 =

This is a list of acts of the Parliament of England for the year 1601.

For acts passed during the period 1707–1800, see the list of acts of the Parliament of Great Britain. See also the list of acts of the Parliament of Scotland, and the list of acts of the Parliament of Ireland.

For acts passed from 1801 onwards, see the list of acts of the Parliament of the United Kingdom. For acts of the devolved parliaments and assemblies in the United Kingdom, see the list of acts of the Scottish Parliament, the list of acts of the Northern Ireland Assembly, and the list of acts and measures of Senedd Cymru; see also the list of acts of the Parliament of Northern Ireland.

For medieval statutes, etc. that are not considered to be acts of Parliament, see the list of English statutes.

See also the List of ordinances and acts of the Parliament of England, 1642–1660 for ordinances and acts passed by the Long Parliament and other bodies without royal assent, and which were not considered to be valid legislation following the Restoration in 1660.

The number shown after each act's title is its chapter number. Acts are cited using this number, preceded by the years of the reign during which the relevant parliamentary session was held; thus the Union with Ireland Act 1800 is cited as "39 & 40 Geo. 3. c. 67", meaning the 67th act passed during the session that started in the 39th year of the reign of George III and which finished in the 40th year of that reign. The modern convention is to use Arabic numerals in citations (thus "41 Geo. 3" rather than "41 Geo. III"). Acts of the last session of the Parliament of Great Britain and the first session of the Parliament of the United Kingdom are both cited as "41 Geo. 3".

Acts passed by the Parliament of England did not have a short title; however, some of these acts have subsequently been given a short title by acts of the Parliament of the United Kingdom, such as the Short Titles Act 1896 (59 & 60 Vict. c. 14).

Acts passed by the Parliament of England were deemed to have come into effect on the first day of the session in which they were passed. Because of this, the years given in the list below may in fact be the year before a particular act was passed.

== 43 Eliz. 1 ==
The 10th Parliament of Queen Elizabeth I, which met from 27 October 1601 until 19 December 1601.

This session was traditionally cited as 43 Eliz., 43 Elz., 43 & 44 Eliz. 1, 43 & 44 Eliz. or 43 & 44 Elz.

=== Public acts ===
| Short title | Citation | Royal assent |
Long title
| Confirmation of Certain Grants Act 1601 (repealed) | 43 Eliz. 1. c. 1 | 19 December 1601 |
An Act for the confirmation of grants made to the Queen's majesty, and of letters patents made by her Highness to others. (Repealed by Statute Law Revision Act 1863 (26 & 27 Vict. c. 125))
| Poor Relief Act 1601 (repealed) | 43 Eliz. 1. c. 2 | 19 December 1601 |
An Act to avoid and prevent divers Misdemeanours in lewd and idle Persons. (Repealed by General Rate Act 1967 (c. 9))
| Disabled Soldiers Act 1601 (repealed) | 43 Eliz. 1. c. 3 | 19 December 1601 |
An Act for the necessary Relief of Soldiers and Mariners. (Repealed by Statute Law Revision Act 1863 (26 & 27 Vict. c. 125))
| Charitable Uses Act 1601 (repealed) | 43 Eliz. 1. c. 4 | 19 December 1601 |
An Act to redress the Mis-employment of Lands, Goods and Stocks of Money heretoforegiven to certain charitable Uses. (Repealed by Mortmain and Charitable Uses Act 1888 (51 & 52 Vict. c. 42))
| Inferior Court Act 1601 (repealed) | 43 Eliz. 1. c. 5 | 19 December 1601 |
An Act to prevent Perjury, and Subornation of Perjury, and unnecessary Expences in Suits of Law. (Repealed by Statute Law Revision Act 1863 (26 & 27 Vict. c. 125) and Statute Law Revision Act 1948 (11 & 12 Geo. 6. c. 62))
| Frivolous Suits Act 1601 (repealed) | 43 Eliz. 1. c. 6 | 19 December 1601 |
An Act to avoid trifling and frivolous Suits in Law in Her Majesty's Courts in Westminster. (Repealed by Sheriffs Act 1887 (50 & 51 Vict. c. 55))
| Robbing of Orchards, etc. Act 1601 (repealed) | 43 Eliz. 1. c. 7 | 19 December 1601 |
An Act to avoid and prevent divers misdemeanors in lewd and idle persons. (Repealed for England and Wales by Criminal Statutes Repeal Act 1827 (7 & 8 Geo. 4. c. 27) and for India by Criminal Law (India) Act 1828 (9 Geo. 4. c. 74))
| Fraudulent Administration of Intestates' Goods Act 1601 (repealed) | 43 Eliz. 1. c. 8 | 19 December 1601 |
An Act against Fraudulent Administration of Intestates Goods. (Repealed with savings by Administration of Estates Act 1925 (15 & 16 Geo. 5. c. 23))
| Continuance, etc. of Laws Act 1601 (repealed) | 43 Eliz. 1. c. 9 | 19 December 1601 |
An Act for Continuance of divers Statutes, and for Repeal of some others. (Repealed by Statute Law Revision Act 1863 (26 & 27 Vict. c. 125))
| Woollen Cloth Act 1601 (repealed) | 43 Eliz. 1. c. 10 | 19 December 1601 |
An Act for the true making and working of Cloth. (Repealed by Woollen Manufacture Act 1809 (49 Geo. 3. c. 109))
| Land Drainage Act 1601 (repealed) | 43 Eliz. 1. c. 11 | 19 December 1601 |
An Act for the Recovering of many Hundred Thousand Acres of Marshes, and other Grounds, subject commonly to surrounding, within the Isle of Elie, and the Counties of Cambridge, Huntingdon, Northampton, Lincoln, Norfolk, and Suffolk. (Repealed by Statute Law Revision Act 1948 (11 & 12 Geo. 6. c. 62))
| Policies of Assurance Act 1601 or the Merchants Assurances Act 1601 (repealed) | 43 Eliz. 1. c. 12 | 19 December 1601 |
An Act concerning Matters of Assurances amongst Merchants. (Repealed by Statute Law Revision Act 1863 (26 & 27 Vict. c. 125))
| Outrages in Northern Counties Act 1601 (repealed) | 43 Eliz. 1. c. 13 | 19 December 1601 |
An Act for the more peaceable government of the parts of Cumberland, Northumberland, Westmorland, and the bishoprick of Durham. (Repealed by Criminal Statutes Repeal Act 1827 (7 & 8 Geo. 4. c. 27))
| Assise of Fuel Act 1601 (repealed) | 43 Eliz. 1. c. 14 | 19 December 1601 |
An Act concerning the Assize of Fuel. (Repealed by Statute Law Revision Act 1863 (26 & 27 Vict. c. 125))
| Fines of Land Act 1601 (repealed) | 43 Eliz. 1. c. 15 | 19 December 1601 |
An Act for the levying of fines with proclamations of lands within the county of the city of Chester. (Repealed by Statute Law Revision Act 1863 (26 & 27 Vict. c. 125))
| Repair of Eden Bridges (Cumberland) Act 1601 (repealed) | 43 Eliz. 1. c. 16 | 19 December 1601 |
An Act for the re-edifying, repairing, and maintaining, of Two Bridges, over the River of Eden, near the City of Carliell, in Cumbreland. (Repealed by Statute Law Revision Act 1948 (11 & 12 Geo. 6. c. 62))
| Taxation Act 1601 (repealed) | 43 Eliz. 1. c. 17 | 19 December 1601 |
An Act for the confirmation of the subsidies granted by the clergy. (Repealed by Statute Law Revision Act 1863 (26 & 27 Vict. c. 125))
| Taxation (No. 2) Act 1601 (repealed) | 43 Eliz. 1. c. 18 | 19 December 1601 |
An Act for the grant of four entire subsidies, and eight fifteens and tenths, granted by the temporality. (Repealed by Statute Law Revision Act 1863 (26 & 27 Vict. c. 125))
| Act of General Pardon 1601 (repealed) | 43 Eliz. 1. c. 19 | 19 December 1601 |
An Act of the Queen's Majesty's General Pardon. (Repealed by Statute Law Revision Act 1863 (26 & 27 Vict. c. 125))

=== Private acts ===
| Short title | Citation | Royal assent |
Long title
| Perfecting the Countess of Sussex's jointure. | 43 Eliz. 1. c. 1 Pr. | 19 December 1601 |
An Act for the Perfecting the Jointure of the Lady Bridget, Countess of Sussex, Wife of Robert Earl of Sussex.
| Assurance of manors and lands for the Countess of Bedford's jointure. | 43 Eliz. 1. c. 2 Pr. | 19 December 1601 |
An Act for the Assurance of certain Manors and Lands, for Part of a Jointure to Lucie Countess of Bedford.
| Denization of Myllet, Pope, Chaundeler, Eaton and Tooley. | 43 Eliz. 1. c. 3 Pr. | 19 December 1601 |
An Act for the Denization of certain Persons.
| Nevills' Estate Act 1601 | 43 Eliz. 1. c. 4 Pr. | 19 December 1601 |
An Act for the enabling of Edward Nevile, of Birling, in the County of Kent, and Sir Henry Nevile, Knight, his Son and Heir Apparent, to dispose of certain Copyhold Lands, Parcel of the Manor of Rotherfield, (Note: Rotherfield, East Sussex.) in the County of Sussex, and of the Manor of Ailesley (Note: Allesley, Warwickshire.) and Filongley, (Note: Fillongley, Warwickshire.) in the County of Warwick.
| Assurance of the manors or farms of Sageburie (otherwise Sadgebutie, Gageburie or Gadgeburie) and Obden to Samuel Sandis and John Harris. | 43 Eliz. 1. c. 5 Pr. | 19 December 1601 |
An Act to confirm the Assurance of the Manors, or Farms, of Sageburie, alias Sadgburie, and Obden, and Hereditaments, to Samuel Sandis, Esquire, and John Harris, Gentleman, and their Heirs.
| Augmentation of Rachel Nevill's jointure. | 43 Eliz. 1. c. 6 Pr. | 19 December 1601 |
An Act for the Augmentation of the Jointure of Rachel, Wife of Edward Nevile, of Birling, in the County of Kent.
| Naturalization of Lupo and others. | 43 Eliz. 1. c. 7 Pr. | 19 December 1601 |
An Act for the Naturalizing of certain Persons born beyond the Seas.
| Assurance of the Patronage of Rotherston (Cheshire) vicarage and a Scholar's room in Christchurch Cathedral, Oxford, by the Dean and Chapter to Thomas Venables. | 43 Eliz. 1. c. 8 Pr. | 19 December 1601 |
An Act for the assuring of the Patronage of the Vicarage of Rotherston, in the County of Chester, and a Scholar's Room, in the Cathedral Church of Christ in Oxon (of the Foundation of King Henry the Eighth), by the Dean and Chapter of the said Cathedral Church, to Thomas Venables, Esquire, and his Heirs for ever.
| Appeasing differences between Francis Ketelby and Andrew Ketelby and his wife Jane. | 43 Eliz. 1. c. 9 Pr. | 19 December 1601 |
An Act for the ending and appeasing of all Controversies, Matters, and Debates, between Frauncis Kettleby of the one Party, and Andrew Kettleby and Jane his Wife of the other Party.
| Edward Lucas' Estate Act 1601 | 43 Eliz. 1. c. 10 Pr. | 19 December 1601 |
An Act to make the Lands, Tenements, and Hereditaments, of Edward Lucas, Gentleman, deceased, Executor of the last Will and Testament of John Flowerdew, Esquire, deceased, liable to the Payment of certain Legacies given by the last Will of the said John Flowerdew, and to the Payment of divers other Debts owing by the said Lucas in his Life Time.

=== Sources ===
- Raithby, John, ed. (1963) [1819]. "43° Eliz.". Statutes of the Realm. Vol. 4 Part 2: The Statutes of Queen Elizabeth (An. 28-43) and of King James (1586–1623). London: Dawsons. pp. 958–1014 – via HathiTrust.
- Raithby, John, ed. (1963) [1819]. "43° Eliz.". Statutes of the Realm. Vol. 4 Part 2: The Statutes of Queen Elizabeth (An. 28-43) and of King James (1586–1623). London: Dawsons. p. 958-1014 – via Google Books.
- Raithby, John, ed. (1963) [1819]. "43° Eliz.". Statutes of the Realm. Vol. 4 Part 2: The Statutes of Queen Elizabeth (An. 28-43) and of King James (1586–1623). London: Dawsons. p. 958-1014 – via Internet Archive.
- Pickering, Danby, ed. (1763). "Anno quadragesimo tertio Elizabetheæ". The Statutes at Large. Vol. 7: From the Thirty-ninth Year of Q. Elizabeth to the Twelfth Year of K. Charles. Inclusive. Cambridge: Joseph Bentham. pp. 29–72 – via Internet Archive.
- Journal of the House of Commons. Vol. 1 – 1547-1629. His Majesty's Stationery Office. 1802 – via British History Online.
- Journal of the House of Lords. Vol. 2: 1578-1614. London: His Majesty's Stationery Office. 1830 – via British History Online.
- Chronological Table of and Index to the Statutes. Vol. 1: To the End of the Session 59 Vict. Sess. 2 (1895) (13th ed.). London: Her Majesty's Stationery Office. 1896. p. 64 – via Google Books.
- Chronological Table of the Statutes: Covering the Period from 1235 to the End of 1971. London: Her Majesty's Stationery Office. 1972. p. 62. ISBN 978-0-11-840096-1 – via Google Books.
- "Chronological Tables of the Private and Personal Acts: Part 1 (1539–1601)". legislation.gov.uk. The National Archives.

== See also ==
- List of acts of the Parliament of England
