= Statute Law (Ireland) Revision Act 1872 =

Act of the Parliament of the United Kingdom

Statute Law (Ireland) Revision Act 1872 (Note: Section 3.)
- Act of Parliament
- Parliament of the United Kingdom
- Long title: An Act for promoting the Revision of the Statute Law by repealing certain Enactments which have ceased to be in force or have become unnecessary in Ireland as spent enactments.
- Citation: 35 & 36 Vict. c. 98
- Introduced by: Richard Dowse and Chichester Fortescue (1870); Thomas O'Hagan, 1st Baron O'Hagan (1872); (Lords)
- Territorial extent: Ireland (Note: Section 2.)

Dates
- Royal assent: 10 August 1872
- Commencement: 10 August 1872 (Note: The Acts of Parliament (Commencement) Act 1793.)
Other legislation
Amends	See § Repealed enactments
Repeals/revokes	See § Repealed enactments
Relates to	Outlawry in Lancashire (No. 2) Act 1491; Poynings' Law 1495; Usury Act 1495; Act of Supremacy 1558; Continuance, etc. of Laws Act 1603; Continuance, etc. of Laws Act 1623; Continuance of Laws, etc. Act 1627; Highways (No. 2) Act 1766; Parliamentary Elections (No. 2) Act 1774; Woollen Manufacture Act 1809; Importation (No. 4) Act 1816; Repeal of Acts Concerning Importation Act 1822; Criminal Law Act 1826; Criminal Statutes Repeal Act 1827; Game Act 1831; Church Discipline Act 1840; Solicitors Act 1843; Salmon Fishery Act 1861; Statute Law Revision Act 1863; Sea Fisheries Act 1868; Bankruptcy Repeal and Insolvent Court Act 1869; Statute Law Revision Act 1873; Statute Law Revision and Civil Procedure Act 1881; Sheriffs Act 1887; Representation of the People Act 1918; Statute Law (Repeals) Act 1969; Commons Act 2006; See Statute Law Revision Act; Statute Law Revision Act 2007

Status: Current legislation

History of passage through Parliament

Records of Parliamentary debate relating to the statute from Hansard

Text of statute as originally enacted

The Statute Law (Ireland) Revision Act 1872 (35 & 36 Vict. c. 98) is an act of the Parliament of the United Kingdom which repealed for Ireland statutes acts of the Parliament of England which had been extended to the then Lordship of Ireland by royal writs or acts of the Parliament of Ireland from the Magna Carta to Poynings' Law 1495 (10 Hen. 7. c. 22 (I)). The act was intended, in particular, to make the revised edition of the statutes already published applicable to Ireland.

The act largely mirrored the Statute Law Revision Act 1863 (26 & 27 Vict. c. 125), which repealed for England and Wales enactments from the Magna Carta to King James II.

As of 2026, the act remains partly in force in the United Kingdom.

== Background ==
In the United Kingdom, acts of Parliament remain in force until expressly repealed. Blackstone's Commentaries on the Laws of England, published in the late 18th-century, raised questions about the system and structure of the common law and the poor drafting and disorder of the existing statute book.

From 1810 to 1825, The Statutes of the Realm was published, providing the first authoritative collection of acts. The first statute law revision act was not passed until 1856 with the Repeal of Obsolete Statutes Act 1856 (19 & 20 Vict. c. 64). This approach — focusing on removing obsolete laws from the statute book followed by consolidation — was proposed by Peter Locke King MP, who had been highly critical of previous commissions' approaches, expenditures, and lack of results.

In 1863, the Statute Law Revision Act 1863 (26 & 27 Vict. c. 125) was passed, which repealed or amended over 1,600 enactments. However, The territorial extent of the act was limited to England and Wales, meaning that those acts passed before Poynings' Act 1495 (10 Hen. 7. c. 22 (I)) were not completely repealed for the United Kingdom.

Previous statute law revision acts
Year passed	Title	Citation	Effect
1861	Statute Law Revision Act 1861	24 & 25 Vict. c. 101	Repealed or amended over 800 enactments
1863	Statute Law Revision Act 1863	26 & 27 Vict. c. 125	Repealed or amended over 1,600 enactments for England and Wales
1867	Statute Law Revision Act 1867	30 & 31 Vict. c. 59	Repealed or amended over 1,380 enactments
1870	Statute Law Revision Act 1870	33 & 34 Vict. c. 69	Repealed or amended over 250 enactments
1871	Promissory Oaths Act 1871	34 & 35 Vict. c. 48	Repealed or amended almost 200 enactments
1871	Statute Law Revision Act 1871	34 & 35 Vict. c. 116	Repealed or amended over 1,060 enactments
1872	Statute Law Revision Act 1872	35 & 36 Vict. c. 63	Repealed or amended almost 490 enactments

== Passage ==
The Statute Law Revision (Ireland) Bill was first introduced in the House of Lords on 9 August 1870 by the Solicitor General for Ireland, Richard Dowse and the Chief Secretary for Ireland, Chichester Fortescue, but did not progress in that parliamentary session.

The re-introduced Statute Law Revision (Ireland) Bill had its first reading in the House of Lords on 16 July 1872, introduced by the Lord Chancellor of Ireland, Thomas O'Hagan, 1st Baron O'Hagan. The bill had its second reading in the House of Lords on 30 July 1872 and was committed to a committee of the whole house, which met and reported on 1 August 1872, without amendments. The bill had its third reading in the House of Lords on 2 August 1872 and passed, without amendments.

The bill had its first reading in the House of Commons on 3 August 1872. The bill had its second reading in the House of Commons on 5 August 1872 and was committed to a committee of the whole house, which met and reported on 6 August 1872, without amendments. The bill had its third reading in the House of Commons on 8 August 1872 and passed, with amendments.

The amended bill was considered and agreed to by the House of Lords on 8 August 1872.

The bill was granted royal assent on 10 August 1872.

== Subsequent developments ==
The act was intended, in particular, to make the revised edition of the statutes already published applicable to Ireland.

The Statute Law Revision (Ireland) Act 1878 (41 & 42 Vict. c. 57) and Statute Law Revision (Ireland) Act 1879 (42 & 43 Vict. c. 24) repealed more enactments of the Parliament of Ireland.

In 1887, the Sheriffs Act 1887 (50 & 51 Vict. c. 55) was passed, which repealed for England and Wales enactments included in the act relating to sheriffs.

The act was retained for the Republic of Ireland by section 2(2)(a) of, and part 4 of schedule 1 to, the Statute Law Revision Act 2007, which came into force on 8 May 2007. The act remains in force there as of 12 September 2024.

== Repealed enactments ==
Section 1 of the act repealed 1,056 enactments, listed in the schedule to the act, across six categories: (Note: The Note of the bill, unlike other Statute Law Revision Acts, did not give commentary on each act.)

- Expired
- Spent
- Repealed in general terms
- Virtually repealed
- Superseded
- Obsolete

Section 1 of the act included several safeguards to ensure that the repeal does not negatively affect existing rights or ongoing legal matters. Specifically, any legal rights, privileges, or remedies already obtained under the repealed laws, as well as any legal proceedings or principles established by them, remain unaffected. Section 1 of the act also ensured that repealed enactments that have been incorporated into other laws would continue to have legal effect in those contexts. Moreover, the repeal would not revive any former rights, offices, or jurisdictions that had already been abolished.

Section 2 of the act specified that the act extended to Ireland only.

Citation	Short title	Subject	Extent of repeal
20 Hen. 3. Provisiones de Merton (Provisions of Merton) c. 3	Redisseisin	Punishment in cases of Redisseizin. Proceedings by the Sheriff in such Cases.	The whole act.
20 Hen. 3. Provisiones de Merton (Provisions of Merton) c. 5	Usury	Usuries shall not run against Minors.	The whole act.
20 Hen. 3. Provisiones de Merton (Provisions of Merton) c. 6	Wardship	Unlawful Marriage of Heirs; if under Fourteen; if of that Age, or above. Disparagement of Wards in Marriage.	The whole act.
20 Hen. 3. Provisiones de Merton (Provisions of Merton) c. 7	Wardship	Refusal of Heirs to marry.	The whole act.
20 Hen. 3. Provisiones de Merton (Provisions of Merton) c. 8	Limitation of writs	Limitation of Writs. Writ of Right. Writs of Mortdauncestor, &c. Writs of Novel Disseisin.	The whole act.
20 Hen. 3. Provisiones de Merton (Provisions of Merton) c. 11	Trespassers in parks	Trespassers in Parks, &c.	The whole act.
20 Hen. 3 Statutum Hibernie de Coheredibus (Statute of Ireland concerning Coparceners)	Coparceners Act 1229	Statutum Hibernie de Coheredibus. The Statute of Ireland concerning Coparceners.	The whole act.
37 Hen. 3 Sententia Excommunicationis Lata in Transgressores Cartarum (Curse on Breakers of the Charters)	Curse on Breakers of the Charters	Sententia Excommunicationis Lata in Transgressores Cartarum. The Sentence of Curse given by the Bishops, against the Breakers of the Charters.	The whole act.
43 Hen. 3 De Provisionibus factis per Regem et Consilium suum (Provisions made by the King and his Council)	Provisions made by the King and his Council	De Provisionibus factis per Regem et Consilium suum. Provisions made by the King and his Council.	The whole act.
51 & 52 Hen. 3 Dictum de Kenilworth (Dictum of Kenilworth)	Rights, Liberties, etc. Act 1266	Dictum de Kenilworth.	The whole act.
51 & 52 Hen. 3 Explanacio Dicti de Kenillworthe	Explanacio Dicti de Kenillworthe	The Award made between the King and his Commons at Kenilworth.	The whole act.
51 & 52 Hen. 3 Addicio Dicti de Kenillworthe	Addicio Dicti de Kenillworthe	The Award made between the King and his Commons at Kenilworth.	The whole act.
52 Hen. 3. Statutum de Marleberge (Statute of Marlborough) c. 6	Wardship	Fraudulent Conveyances shall not avoid Wardships. Process and Trial to avoid such Conveyances. Saving of Suits to Feoffees. Damage and Costs upon Malicious Suits by Lords.	The whole act.
52 Hen. 3. Statutum de Marleberge (Statute of Marlborough) c. 7	Wardship	Of the Writ of Ward and Process thereon. Saving for Heirs within Age.	The whole act.
52 Hen. 3. Statutum de Marleberge (Statute of Marlborough) c. 8	Redisseisin	Of Persons taken for Redisseisin.	The whole act.
52 Hen. 3. Statutum de Marleberge (Statute of Marlborough) c. 11	Beaupleader	No Fines for Beaupleader.	The whole act.
52 Hen. 3. Statutum de Marleberge (Statute of Marlborough) c. 12	Real Actions Act 1267	Of Days in Court; in Dower; of Days in Court in Daring Presentment, and Quare Impedit. Process upon Attachments.	The whole act.
52 Hen. 3. Statutum de Marleberge (Statute of Marlborough) c. 13	Essoins	Of Essoin after Issue joined. Proceedings on Default.	The whole act.
52 Hen. 3. Statutum de Marleberge (Statute of Marlborough) c. 16	Wardships, etc.	The Heir's Remedy after Wardship for Lands withholden. Simple Seisin only shall be taken of an Heir of full Age. The King shall have Primer Seisin, of Lands holden of him in chief.	The whole act.
52 Hen. 3. Statutum de Marleberge (Statute of Marlborough) c. 22	Freeholders	Compelling Freeholders to answer, &c.	The whole act.
52 Hen. 3. Statutum de Marleberge (Statute of Marlborough) c. 24	Inquest	Concerning the Attendance of those of 12 Years old at Inquests.	The whole act.
52 Hen. 3. Statutum de Marleberge (Statute of Marlborough) c. 26	Real actions	Of the Vouchee to Warranty's Appearance in Court.	The whole act.
52 Hen. 3. Statutum de Marleberge (Statute of Marlborough) c. 27	Benefit of clergy	Of a Clerk's Bail, on his refusing to answer.	The whole act.
52 Hen. 3. Statutum de Marleberge (Statute of Marlborough) c. 29	Real actions	Writ of Entry in the Post.	The whole act.
3 Edw. 1. Les permers Estatuz de Westmuster (Statute of Westminster the First) c. 1	Peace of the Church and the Realm Act 1275	For the maintaining Peace and Justice. For the Ease of Religious Houses. Purveyance of Victual. Purveyance for Carriage. Penalty on Offenders. Action by the Party for the King. Penalty on the Sheriff's Officers. No suit for denying lodging. To whom the Act shall extend. Prelates, &c. restrained in lodging with religious Persons, &c. to lodge. Sheriff's Retinue.	The whole act.
3 Edw. 1. Les permers Estatuz de Westmuster (Statute of Westminster the First) c. 3	Escapes	No Fines for Escapes before Judgment.	The whole act.
3 Edw. 1. Les permers Estatuz de Westmuster (Statute of Westminster the First) c. 4	Wreck Act 1275	Wreck. Custody of Goods wrecked; for the Owner; for the King. Penalty on Offenders.	The whole act.
3 Edw. 1. Les permers Estatuz de Westmuster (Statute of Westminster the First) c. 7	Purveyance	Purveyance for Castles.	The whole act.
3 Edw. 1. Les permers Estatuz de Westmuster (Statute of Westminster the First) c. 8	Beaupleader	Beaupleader.	The whole act.
3 Edw. 1. Les permers Estatuz de Westmuster (Statute of Westminster the First) c. 12	Standing mute	Felons refusing to plead.	The whole act.
3 Edw. 1. Les permers Estatuz de Westmuster (Statute of Westminster the First) c. 14	Principal and accessory	Proceedings in Appeal against Principal and Accessary.	The whole act.
3 Edw. 1. Les permers Estatuz de Westmuster (Statute of Westminster the First) c. 17	Distress	The Remedy if a Distress be impounded in a Castle or Fortress. Marches of Wales.	The whole act.
3 Edw. 1. Les permers Estatuz de Westmuster (Statute of Westminster the First) c. 18	Fines on the county	Assessing of common Fines on the County.	The whole act.
3 Edw. 1. Les permers Estatuz de Westmuster (Statute of Westminster the First) c. 22	Wardship	Marriage of Wards. Marriage of Female Wards. Penalty on such Wards refusing Marriage.	The whole act.
3 Edw. 1. Les permers Estatuz de Westmuster (Statute of Westminster the First) c. 23	Distress for debt against strangers	Distress for Debts in Cities, &c. against Strangers.	The whole act.
3 Edw. 1. Les permers Estatuz de Westmuster (Statute of Westminster the First) c. 27	Extortion	Extortion by Clerks of Justices, &c.	The whole act.
3 Edw. 1. Les permers Estatuz de Westmuster (Statute of Westminster the First) c. 30	Extortion	Extortion by Officers of Courts.	The whole act.
3 Edw. 1. Les permers Estatuz de Westmuster (Statute of Westminster the First) c. 32	Purveyance, Crown debts	Defaults of Purveyors. Purchasing the King's Debts. Purveyance of Horses and Carts.	The whole act.
3 Edw. 1. Les permers Estatuz de Westmuster (Statute of Westminster the First) c. 33	Barretors	Barretors in County Courts.	The whole act.
3 Edw. 1. Les permers Estatuz de Westmuster (Statute of Westminster the First) c. 36	Aids for knighthood, etc.	Aids for Knighthood and Marriage.	The whole act.
3 Edw. 1. Les permers Estatuz de Westmuster (Statute of Westminster the First) c. 37	Dissseisin with robbery, etc.	Disseisin with Robbery; or by Force.	The whole act.
3 Edw. 1. Les permers Estatuz de Westmuster (Statute of Westminster the First) c. 38	Attaints in real actions	Attaints in Real Actions.	The whole act.
3 Edw. 1. Les permers Estatuz de Westmuster (Statute of Westminster the First) c. 39	Limitation of prescription	Limitation of Prescription.	The whole act.
3 Edw. 1. Les permers Estatuz de Westmuster (Statute of Westminster the First) c. 40	Voucher to warranty	Vouchers to Warranty. In Writs of Entry no Voucher out of the Line. Counterpleading to Voucher in Writ of Right.	The whole act.
3 Edw. 1. Les permers Estatuz de Westmuster (Statute of Westminster the First) c. 41	Writ of right	Champion's Oath in a Writ of Right.	The whole act.
3 Edw. 1. Les permers Estatuz de Westmuster (Statute of Westminster the First) c. 42	Essoins	No Essoin after Appearance.	The whole act.
3 Edw. 1. Les permers Estatuz de Westmuster (Statute of Westminster the First) c. 43	Essoins	Of Essoins by Parceners, &c.	The whole act.
3 Edw. 1. Les permers Estatuz de Westmuster (Statute of Westminster the First) c. 44	Essoins	Essoin of Ultra Mare.	The whole act.
3 Edw. 1. Les permers Estatuz de Westmuster (Statute of Westminster the First) c. 45	Process	Process to compel Appearance. Estreats of Issues.	The whole act.
3 Edw. 1. Les permers Estatuz de Westmuster (Statute of Westminster the First) c. 46	Order of hearing pleas	Order of hearing Pleas.	The whole act.
3 Edw. 1. Les permers Estatuz de Westmuster (Statute of Westminster the First) c. 47	Real Actions Act 1275	Nonage of Heirs in Disseisins.	The whole act.
3 Edw. 1. Les permers Estatuz de Westmuster (Statute of Westminster the First) c. 48	Land in Ward Act 1275	Unlawful Feoffment of Lands in Ward. Suit of Prochein Amy.	The whole act.
3 Edw. 1. Les permers Estatuz de Westmuster (Statute of Westminster the First) c. 49	Plea in dower	Plea in Dower.	The whole act.
3 Edw. 1. Les permers Estatuz de Westmuster (Statute of Westminster the First) c. 51	Times of taking certain assizes	Time of taking certain Assises enlarged.	The whole act.
4 Edw. 1. Statutum de Bigamis (Statute of Bigamy) c. 1	In what Cases Aid shall be granted of the King, in what not.	Statutum de Bigamis. Statute of Bigamy.	The whole act.
4 Edw. 1. Statutum de Bigamis (Statute of Bigamy) c. 2	In what Case Aid is granted of the King, in what not.	Statutum de Bigamis. Statute of Bigamy.	The whole act.
4 Edw. 1. Statutum de Bigamis (Statute of Bigamy) c. 3	In Dower the King's Grantee of a Ward shall not have aid.	Statutum de Bigamis. Statute of Bigamy.	The whole act.
4 Edw. 1. Statutum de Bigamis (Statute of Bigamy) c. 4	Purprestures or Usurpations upon the King's Land shall be resised.	Statutum de Bigamis. Statute of Bigamy.	The whole act.
4 Edw. 1. Statutum de Bigamis (Statute of Bigamy) c. 5	Bigamus shall not be allowed his Clergy.	Statutum de Bigamis. Statute of Bigamy.	The whole act.
4 Edw. 1. Statutum de Bigamis (Statute of Bigamy) c. 6	By what Words in a Feoffment a Feoffor shall be bound to Warranty.	Statutum de Bigamis. Statute of Bigamy.	The whole act.
4 Edw. 1. Statutum de Justic̃ assigñ quod vocatur Rageman (A Statute concerning Justices being assigned, called Rageman)	Statute concerning Justices being assigned, called Rageman	Statut' de Justic' assig'n; q'd vocatr Rageman. A Statute concerning Justices being assigned; called Rageman.	The whole act.
6 Edw. 1 Statuta Gloucestr' (Statutes of Gloucester) part preceding c. 1	Franchise	The part preceding c. 1; namely, — Franchises claimed may be used till Trial had. Proceedings on Claims to Franchises. Seiser of Franchises on Non-appearance. Exception for Want of Original Writ. Proceedings on Claim of Franchises by Seisin of Ancestors. Form of Writ. Proceedings on such Write. Complaint against Bailiffs.	The whole act.
6 Edw. 1. Statuta Gloucestr' (Statutes of Gloucester) c. 2	Real actions	No Delay for Nonage of the Demandant.	The whole act.
6 Edw. 1. Statuta Gloucestr' (Statutes of Gloucester) c. 3	Real actions	Alienation by Tenant in Curtesy, void.	The whole act.
6 Edw. 1. Statuta Gloucestr' (Statutes of Gloucester) c. 4	Real actions	Remedy by Cessavit against a Tenant in Fee-farm.	The whole act.
6 Edw. 1. Statuta Gloucestr' (Statutes of Gloucester) c. 5	Actions of waste	One Writ of Mortdauncestor for divers Heirs.	The whole act.
6 Edw. 1. Statuta Gloucestr' (Statutes of Gloucester) c. 7	Real actions	Writ of Entry in Casu proviso upon Alienation of Dower.	The whole act.
6 Edw. 1. Statuta Gloucestr' (Statutes of Gloucester) c. 9	Homicide	No Writ out of Chancery in certain Cases of Homicide. Of Appeals in Cases of Homicide.	The whole act.
6 Edw. 1. Statuta Gloucestr' (Statutes of Gloucester) c. 10	Essoins	One Essoin for Man and Wife.	The whole act.
6 Edw. 1. Statuta Gloucestr' (Statutes of Gloucester) c. 11	Real actions, etc.	Feigned Recovery in London against a Termor.	The whole act.
6 Edw. 1. Statuta Gloucestr' (Statutes of Gloucester) c. 12	Real actions, etc.	Vouching a Foreigner in London.	The whole act.
6 Edw. 1. Statuta Gloucestr' (Statutes of Gloucester) c. 13	Real actions, etc.	Waste restrained pending Suit.	The whole act.
6 Edw. 1. Statuta Gloucestr' (Statutes of Gloucester) c. 14	Real actions, etc.	Damages upon Disseisins in London.	The whole act.
6 Edw. 1. Statuta Gloucestr' (Statutes of Gloucester) c. 15	Breach of assize in London	Of Breach of Assise in London.	The whole act.
6 Edw. 1 Explanaciones Stat. Gloucestr' (Exposition of the Statute of Gloucester)	Damages, real actions, etc.	Exposition of the Statute of Gloucester.	The whole act.
9 Edw. 1 Articulus Statuti Glouc̃ (An Article of the Statute of Gloucester)	Voucher to warranty in London	Articulus Statuti Glouc' p Dñm E. quondam Regem Angl' prem Regis nunc, Anno Regni sui nono, & Consilium suu editus London de Forinsceis vocatis ad Warantum in Hustengo London. An Article of the Statute of Gloucester by our Sovereign Lord Edward, formerly King of England, Father of the now King, in the ninth Year of his Reign, and by his Council, corrected for the Citizens of London, touching the vouching of Foreigners to Warranty in the Hustings in London.	The whole act.
11 Edw. 1 Statutum de Mercatoribus (Statute of Merchants)	Statute of Acton Burnell	Statutu' Mercatorib'. The Statute of Merchants.	The whole act.
13 Edw. 1. Statuta Regis Edwardi edita apud Westmon̄, in Parliamento suo Pascha Anno Regni sui Tercio decimo (Statutes of King Edward made at Westminster, in his Parliament at Easter, in the Thirteenth Year of his Reign) c. 3	Real actions	A Cui in vita for the Wife, where her deceased Husband lost by Default. Receipt of the Wife upon the Husband's Default. Receipt of him in the Reversion.	The whole act.
13 Edw. 1. Statuta Regis Edwardi edita apud Westmon̄, in Parliamento suo Pascha Anno Regni sui Tercio decimo (Statutes of King Edward made at Westminster, in his Parliament at Easter, in the Thirteenth Year of his Reign) c. 4	Real actions	The Wife endowable of Land recovered against her Husband by Default, &c. Remedy for Tenants for Life, &c. who lose their Land by Default. Writ for the Heir on Dower recovered during his Minority. Writ of Dower, after Dower lost by Default. Writs for other particular Tenants after Default. For Tenant in Frankmarriage. For Tenant for Life. For Tenant in Tail.	The whole act.
13 Edw. 1. Statuta Regis Edwardi edita apud Westmon̄, in Parliamento suo Pascha Anno Regni sui Tercio decimo (Statutes of King Edward made at Westminster, in his Parliament at Easter, in the Thirteenth Year of his Reign) c. 6	Real actions	The Penalty where the Vouchee denieth his Warranty. A Venire facias at the Demandant's Request.	The whole act.
13 Edw. 1. Statuta Regis Edwardi edita apud Westmon̄, in Parliamento suo Pascha Anno Regni sui Tercio decimo (Statutes of King Edward made at Westminster, in his Parliament at Easter, in the Thirteenth Year of his Reign) c. 7	Real actions	Admeasurement of Dower for Guardian or Heir. Process thereon: and in Admeasurement of Pasture.	The whole act.
13 Edw. 1. Statuta Regis Edwardi edita apud Westmon̄, in Parliamento suo Pascha Anno Regni sui Tercio decimo (Statutes of King Edward made at Westminster, in his Parliament at Easter, in the Thirteenth Year of his Reign) c. 8	Real actions	The Remedy upon a Second Overcharge of Pasture. Writs de Secunda Superoneratione shall be inrolled. And Writs of Redisseisein.	The whole act.
13 Edw. 1. Statuta Regis Edwardi edita apud Westmon̄, in Parliamento suo Pascha Anno Regni sui Tercio decimo (Statutes of King Edward made at Westminster, in his Parliament at Easter, in the Thirteenth Year of his Reign) c. 9	Real actions	The Writ of Mesne, and new Process therein. The Mesne forejudged of his Fee and Services in Default of Appearance. The Tenant holding by less Service than the Mesne doth. Proceedings when the Mesne doth appear. Damages in a Writ of Mesne. The Tenants may have Warranty of the Mesne, &c. For what Mesne Tenants this Statute is ordained.	The whole act.
13 Edw. 1. Statuta Regis Edwardi edita apud Westmon̄, in Parliamento suo Pascha Anno Regni sui Tercio decimo (Statutes of King Edward made at Westminster, in his Parliament at Easter, in the Thirteenth Year of his Reign) c. 11	Accountants Act 1285	On Testimony of Auditors Accomptants may be committed to Prison, &c.	The whole act. (Note: This act was not included in the Statute Law Revision Act 1863 (26 & 27 Vict. c. 125). This act was repealed for England and Wales by the Bankruptcy Repeal and Insolvent Court Act 1869 (32 & 33 Vict. c. 83).)
13 Edw. 1. Statuta Regis Edwardi edita apud Westmon̄, in Parliamento suo Pascha Anno Regni sui Tercio decimo (Statutes of King Edward made at Westminster, in his Parliament at Easter, in the Thirteenth Year of his Reign) c. 12	Appeal of felony	Punishment of an Appellor for a false Appeal. A Year's Imprisonment. Inquiry of Abettors, of Appeals and their Punishment. No Essoin for the Appellor.	The whole act.
13 Edw. 1. Statuta Regis Edwardi edita apud Westmon̄, in Parliamento suo Pascha Anno Regni sui Tercio decimo (Statutes of King Edward made at Westminster, in his Parliament at Easter, in the Thirteenth Year of his Reign) c. 16	Wardship	Priority of Feoffment giveth Title of Wardship.	The whole act.
13 Edw. 1. Statuta Regis Edwardi edita apud Westmon̄, in Parliamento suo Pascha Anno Regni sui Tercio decimo (Statutes of King Edward made at Westminster, in his Parliament at Easter, in the Thirteenth Year of his Reign) c. 17	Essoin	Of the Essoin De malo lecti.	The whole act.
13 Edw. 1. Statuta Regis Edwardi edita apud Westmon̄, in Parliamento suo Pascha Anno Regni sui Tercio decimo (Statutes of King Edward made at Westminster, in his Parliament at Easter, in the Thirteenth Year of his Reign) c. 20	Real actions	The Tenant's answer in a Writ of Cosinage, Aiel, and Besaiel.	The whole act.
13 Edw. 1. Statuta Regis Edwardi edita apud Westmon̄, in Parliamento suo Pascha Anno Regni sui Tercio decimo (Statutes of King Edward made at Westminster, in his Parliament at Easter, in the Thirteenth Year of his Reign) c. 21	Real actions	Writ of Cessavit for Services in Arrear. For the Heir against Heir, or Alienee.	The whole act.
13 Edw. 1. Statuta Regis Edwardi edita apud Westmon̄, in Parliamento suo Pascha Anno Regni sui Tercio decimo (Statutes of King Edward made at Westminster, in his Parliament at Easter, in the Thirteenth Year of his Reign) c. 24	Real actions	Writs in consimili Casu. Quod permittat by Successor of a Parson. Juris utrum by one Church against another. The clerks in Chancery shall devise Writs in consimili Casu.	The whole act.
13 Edw. 1. Statuta Regis Edwardi edita apud Westmon̄, in Parliamento suo Pascha Anno Regni sui Tercio decimo (Statutes of King Edward made at Westminster, in his Parliament at Easter, in the Thirteenth Year of his Reign) c. 25	Real actions	Of what Things an Assize of Novel disseisin shall lie, whereof it lay not before. Remedy on Alienation by Tenant for Years, or in Ward. Penalty for failing of Exception pleaded by Defendant: double Damages and Imprisonment. Proceedings on pleading Exceptions by a Bailiff. In what Case a Certificate of Assize doth lie. Proceedings on Deeds not pleaded by reason of Defendant's Absence. Sheriff's Fee.	The whole act.
13 Edw. 1. Statuta Regis Edwardi edita apud Westmon̄, in Parliamento suo Pascha Anno Regni sui Tercio decimo (Statutes of King Edward made at Westminster, in his Parliament at Easter, in the Thirteenth Year of his Reign) c. 26	Real actions	Double Damages in Writs of Redisseisin. Writs of Redisseisin on Recovery by Default, &c.	The whole act.
13 Edw. 1. Statuta Regis Edwardi edita apud Westmon̄, in Parliamento suo Pascha Anno Regni sui Tercio decimo (Statutes of King Edward made at Westminster, in his Parliament at Easter, in the Thirteenth Year of his Reign) c. 27	Essoins	Essoin after Issue, but none after day given, Prece partium.	The whole act.
13 Edw. 1. Statuta Regis Edwardi edita apud Westmon̄, in Parliamento suo Pascha Anno Regni sui Tercio decimo (Statutes of King Edward made at Westminster, in his Parliament at Easter, in the Thirteenth Year of his Reign) c. 28	Essoins	No Essoin for Demandant.	The whole act.
13 Edw. 1. Statuta Regis Edwardi edita apud Westmon̄, in Parliamento suo Pascha Anno Regni sui Tercio decimo (Statutes of King Edward made at Westminster, in his Parliament at Easter, in the Thirteenth Year of his Reign) c. 38	Juries	How many and what Sort of Persons shall be returned in Juries or Petit Assises. Exception, as to great Assizes. Sheriffs or Officers offending.	The whole act.
13 Edw. 1. Statuta Regis Edwardi edita apud Westmon̄, in Parliamento suo Pascha Anno Regni sui Tercio decimo (Statutes of King Edward made at Westminster, in his Parliament at Easter, in the Thirteenth Year of his Reign) c. 40	Real actions	A Woman's Suit not deferred by the Minority of the Heir.	The whole act.
13 Edw. 1. Statuta Regis Edwardi edita apud Westmon̄, in Parliamento suo Pascha Anno Regni sui Tercio decimo (Statutes of King Edward made at Westminster, in his Parliament at Easter, in the Thirteenth Year of his Reign) c. 43	Hospitallers and Templars	Hospitallers and Templars shall draw no Man into Suit belonging to the King's Court.	The whole act.
13 Edw. 1. Statuta Regis Edwardi edita apud Westmon̄, in Parliamento suo Pascha Anno Regni sui Tercio decimo (Statutes of King Edward made at Westminster, in his Parliament at Easter, in the Thirteenth Year of his Reign) c. 44	Fees of officers on circuit	The Fees of Porters and Vergers. Cyrographers. Clerks writing original Writs. Punishment of Offenders.	The whole act.
13 Edw. 1. Statuta Regis Edwardi edita apud Westmon̄, in Parliamento suo Pascha Anno Regni sui Tercio decimo (Statutes of King Edward made at Westminster, in his Parliament at Easter, in the Thirteenth Year of his Reign) c. 46	Commons Act 1285	Lords may approve against their neighbours usurpation of Commons.	The whole act. (Note: This act was not included in the Statute Law Revision Act 1863 (26 & 27 Vict. c. 125). This act was repealed for England and Wales by the Commons Act 2006.)
13 Edw. 1. Statuta Regis Edwardi edita apud Westmon̄, in Parliamento suo Pascha Anno Regni sui Tercio decimo (Statutes of King Edward made at Westminster, in his Parliament at Easter, in the Thirteenth Year of his Reign) c. 47	Salmon preservation	Penalty for taking Salmons at certain times of the year.	The whole act. (Note: This act was not included in the Statute Law Revision Act 1863 (26 & 27 Vict. c. 125). This act was repealed for England and Wales by the Salmon Fishery Act 1861 (24 & 25 Vict. c. 109).)
13 Edw. 1. Statuta Regis Edwardi edita apud Westmon̄, in Parliamento suo Pascha Anno Regni sui Tercio decimo (Statutes of King Edward made at Westminster, in his Parliament at Easter, in the Thirteenth Year of his Reign) c. 48	Real actions	In what Cases a View of Land is grantable.	The whole act.
13 Edw. 1. Statutum Mercatorum (Statute of Merchants)	Recovery of Debts by Statute Merchant Act 1285	Statutum Mercatorum. The Statute of Merchants.	The whole act.
13 Edw. 1. Statutū Circumspecte Agatis (Statute of Circumspecte Agatis)	Prohibition to Spiritual Court Act 1285	Statutū Circumspecte Agatis The Statute of Circumspecte Agatis in part; namely:— (1) So much of the Provision beginning "And for laying," and ending "an Oath," as relates to laying violent Hands on a Clerk, and to Cause of Defamation. (2) From "And if any lay violent Hands" to the End of the Statute.	The whole act.
13 Edw. 1. Forma Confirmationis Cartarum (The Form of Confirmation of Charters)	Form of Confirmation of Charters Act 1285	Forma Confirmationis Cartarum. The Form of Confirmation of Charters.	The whole act.
13 Edw. 1 Statutum Wynton̄ (Statute of Winchester) c. 1	Fresh Suit shall be made after Felons and Robbers from Town to Town, &c.	Stat. Wynton. The Statute of Winchester, except the last clause of chap. 6. Fresh suit shall be made after Felons from town to town. Inquests of Felonies. The Hundred answerable for Robberies. The County shall have but 40 days. Commencement of this Statute. At what time the gates of towns shall be opened and shut. Lodgers in the suburbs. At what time of the night watch shall begin and end. Strangers may be arrested by the Watch or hue and cry after them. Highways to Market Towns shall be enlarged. The Lord answerable. Parks adjoining Highways. What armour each person shall have in his house. View of Arms. Presentment of Offences against the statute. Fairs and Markets shall not be kept in Churchyards.	The whole act. (Note: This act was not included in the Statute Law Revision Act 1863 (26 & 27 Vict. c. 125). This act was repealed for England and Wales by the Criminal Statutes Repeal Act 1827 (7 & 8 Geo. 4. c. 27).)
13 Edw. 1 Statutum Wynton̄ (Statute of Winchester) c. 2	Inquiry of Felons and Robbers, and the County shall answer if they be not taken	Stat. Wynton. The Statute of Winchester, except the last clause of chap. 6. Fresh suit shall be made after Felons from town to town. Inquests of Felonies. The Hundred answerable for Robberies. The County shall have but 40 days. Commencement of this Statute. At what time the gates of towns shall be opened and shut. Lodgers in the suburbs. At what time of the night watch shall begin and end. Strangers may be arrested by the Watch or hue and cry after them. Highways to Market Towns shall be enlarged. The Lord answerable. Parks adjoining Highways. What armour each person shall have in his house. View of Arms. Presentment of Offences against the statute. Fairs and Markets shall not be kept in Churchyards.	The whole act.
13 Edw. 1 Statutum Wynton̄ (Statute of Winchester) c. 3	This act shall be respited until Easter next	Stat. Wynton. The Statute of Winchester, except the last clause of chap. 6. Fresh suit shall be made after Felons from town to town. Inquests of Felonies. The Hundred answerable for Robberies. The County shall have but 40 days. Commencement of this Statute. At what time the gates of towns shall be opened and shut. Lodgers in the suburbs. At what time of the night watch shall begin and end. Strangers may be arrested by the Watch or hue and cry after them. Highways to Market Towns shall be enlarged. The Lord answerable. Parks adjoining Highways. What armour each person shall have in his house. View of Arms. Presentment of Offences against the statute. Fairs and Markets shall not be kept in Churchyards.	The whole act.
13 Edw. 1 Statutum Wynton̄ (Statute of Winchester) c. 4	At what Times the Gates of great Towns shall be shut, and when the Night Watch shall begin and end.	Stat. Wynton. The Statute of Winchester, except the last clause of chap. 6. Fresh suit shall be made after Felons from town to town. Inquests of Felonies. The Hundred answerable for Robberies. The County shall have but 40 days. Commencement of this Statute. At what time the gates of towns shall be opened and shut. Lodgers in the suburbs. At what time of the night watch shall begin and end. Strangers may be arrested by the Watch or hue and cry after them. Highways to Market Towns shall be enlarged. The Lord answerable. Parks adjoining Highways. What armour each person shall have in his house. View of Arms. Presentment of Offences against the statute. Fairs and Markets shall not be kept in Churchyards.	The whole act.
13 Edw. 1 Statutum Wynton̄ (Statute of Winchester) c. 5	Breadth of Highways leading from one Market-Town to another	Stat. Wynton. The Statute of Winchester, except the last clause of chap. 6. Fresh suit shall be made after Felons from town to town. Inquests of Felonies. The Hundred answerable for Robberies. The County shall have but 40 days. Commencement of this Statute. At what time the gates of towns shall be opened and shut. Lodgers in the suburbs. At what time of the night watch shall begin and end. Strangers may be arrested by the Watch or hue and cry after them. Highways to Market Towns shall be enlarged. The Lord answerable. Parks adjoining Highways. What armour each person shall have in his house. View of Arms. Presentment of Offences against the statute. Fairs and Markets shall not be kept in Churchyards.	The whole act. (Note: This act was not included in the Statute Law Revision Act 1863 (26 & 27 Vict. c. 125). This act was repealed for England and Wales by the Highways (No. 2) Act 1766 (7 Geo. 3. c. 42).)
13 Edw. 1 Statutum Wynton̄ (Statute of Winchester) c. 6	Fairs and markets in churchyards	Stat. Wynton. The Statute of Winchester, except the last clause of chap. 6. Fresh suit shall be made after Felons from town to town. Inquests of Felonies. The Hundred answerable for Robberies. The County shall have but 40 days. Commencement of this Statute. At what time the gates of towns shall be opened and shut. Lodgers in the suburbs. At what time of the night watch shall begin and end. Strangers may be arrested by the Watch or hue and cry after them. Highways to Market Towns shall be enlarged. The Lord answerable. Parks adjoining Highways. What armour each person shall have in his house. View of Arms. Presentment of Offences against the statute. Fairs and Markets shall not be kept in Churchyards.	The whole act. (Note: This act was not included in the Statute Law Revision Act 1863 (26 & 27 Vict. c. 125). This act was repealed for England and Wales by the Statute Law (Repeals) Act 1969 (c. 52).)
20 Edw. 1. D' Presentibz vocatis ad Warantū (Of Persons vouched to Warranty who are Present)	Statute of Vouchers	D' Presentibz vocatis ad Warantū. Of Persons vouched to Warranty who are Present.	The whole act.
20 Edw. 1. Statutum de Vasto (Statute of Waste)	Statute of Waste	Statutum de Vasto. A Statute of Waste.	The whole act.
20 Edw. 1. Statutum de Defensione Juris (Statute of defending Right)	Statute of defending Right	Statutum de Defensione Juris. The Statute of Defending Right.	The whole act.
20 Edw. 1. De brevi de Inquisicione concedenda de terris ad manum mortuam ponendis (Statute of Writs for making Inquisitions of Lands to be put in Mortmain)	Statute of Writs for making Inquisitions of Lands to be put in Mortmain	Statute of Writs for making Inquisitions of Lands to be put in Mortmain.	The whole act.
20 Edw. 1. De Inquisitionibus non allocandis de terris ponendis ad mortuam manum (Statute of Amortising Lands)	Statute of Amortising Lands	A Statute of amortising Lands.	The whole act.
25 Edw. 1. Magna Carta de Libertatibus Anglie, et de Libertatibus Foreste (The Great Charter of Liberties of England and of the Liberties of the Forest) c. 2	Reliefs	Reliefs; of Earls, Barons, Knights.	The whole act.
25 Edw. 1. Magna Carta de Libertatibus Anglie, et de Libertatibus Foreste (The Great Charter of Liberties of England and of the Liberties of the Forest) c. 3	Wardships	Wardship. Infant made Knight.	The whole act.
25 Edw. 1. Magna Carta de Libertatibus Anglie, et de Libertatibus Foreste (The Great Charter of Liberties of England and of the Liberties of the Forest) c. 4	Waste during Wardship	Waste during Wardship. Sale or Gift of Wardship.	The whole act.
25 Edw. 1. Magna Carta de Libertatibus Anglie, et de Libertatibus Foreste (The Great Charter of Liberties of England and of the Liberties of the Forest) c. 5	Lands in ward and temporalities of vacant archbishoprics, etc.	Sustaining Lands in Wardship. Custody of Spiritual Dignities.	The whole act.
25 Edw. 1. Magna Carta de Libertatibus Anglie, et de Libertatibus Foreste (The Great Charter of Liberties of England and of the Liberties of the Forest) c. 6	Marriage of heirs	Marriage of Heirs.	The whole act.
25 Edw. 1. Magna Carta de Libertatibus Anglie, et de Libertatibus Foreste (The Great Charter of Liberties of England and of the Liberties of the Forest) c. 13	Assizes of darrein presentment	Assizes of Darrein presentment.	The whole act.
25 Edw. 1. Magna Carta de Libertatibus Anglie, et de Libertatibus Foreste (The Great Charter of Liberties of England and of the Liberties of the Forest) c. 19	Purveyance for a Castle	Purveyance for a Castle.	The whole act.
25 Edw. 1. Magna Carta de Libertatibus Anglie, et de Libertatibus Foreste (The Great Charter of Liberties of England and of the Liberties of the Forest) c. 20	Castle ward	Castle Ward.	The whole act.
25 Edw. 1. Magna Carta de Libertatibus Anglie, et de Libertatibus Foreste (The Great Charter of Liberties of England and of the Liberties of the Forest) c. 21	Purveyance for Carriage	Purveyance for Carriage.	The whole act.
25 Edw. 1. Magna Carta de Libertatibus Anglie, et de Libertatibus Foreste (The Great Charter of Liberties of England and of the Liberties of the Forest) c. 24	Writ of præcipe	Writ of Præcipe.	The whole act.
25 Edw. 1. Magna Carta de Libertatibus Anglie, et de Libertatibus Foreste (The Great Charter of Liberties of England and of the Liberties of the Forest) c. 27	Where the King shall not have Wardship	Where the King shall not have Wardship.	The whole act.
25 Edw. 1. Magna Carta de Libertatibus Anglie, et de Libertatibus Foreste (The Great Charter of Liberties of England and of the Liberties of the Forest) c. 28	Wager of law	Wager of Law.	The whole act.
25 Edw. 1. Magna Carta de Libertatibus Anglie, et de Libertatibus Foreste (The Great Charter of Liberties of England and of the Liberties of the Forest) c. 31	Baronies escheated to the Crown	Baronies escheated to the King. Wardship therein.	The whole act.
25 Edw. 1. Magna Carta de Libertatibus Anglie, et de Libertatibus Foreste (The Great Charter of Liberties of England and of the Liberties of the Forest) c. 33	Custody of vacant abbeys	Custody of vacant Abbies.	The whole act.
25 Edw. 1. Magna Carta de Libertatibus Anglie, et de Libertatibus Foreste (The Great Charter of Liberties of England and of the Liberties of the Forest) c. 34	Appeal of death	Appeal of Death by a Woman.	The whole act.
25 Edw. 1. Magna Carta de Libertatibus Anglie, et de Libertatibus Foreste (The Great Charter of Liberties of England and of the Liberties of the Forest) c. 36	Mortmain	Fraudulent Gifts in Mortmain.	The whole act.
25 Edw. 1. Magna Carta de Libertatibus Anglie, et de Libertatibus Foreste (The Great Charter of Liberties of England and of the Liberties of the Forest) c. 37	Confirmation of customs and liberties	Escuage. General Saving. Observance of these Liberties. Subsidy, in respect of this Charter and Charter of the Forest. — Except from "Reserving" to the end.	The whole act.
25 Edw. 1. Sententia lata super Confirmatione Cartarum (Sentence of the Clergy given on the Confirmation of the Charters)	Sententia lata super Confirmatione Cartarum	Sententia lata super Confirmatione Cartarum. The Sentence of the Clergy given on the Confirmation of the Charters.	The whole act.
27 Edw. 1. Statutum de Finibus Levatis (Statute of Fines Levied) part preceding c. 1	Part preceding c. 1	The Enacting Part preceding Chapter One.	The whole act.
27 Edw. 1. Statutum de Finibus Levatis (Statute of Fines Levied) c. 1	No Exception to a Fine that the Defendant was seized. Fines shall be openly read.	Exception to a Fine, that the Demandant was always seised, shall not be admitted. Fines shall be read in open Court.	The whole act.
27 Edw. 1. Statutum de Finibus Levatis (Statute of Fines Levied) c. 2	A Sheriff shall levy no more Issues than he hath Warrant for. His Tallies.	How Sheriffs shall be charged with Issues. Sheriffs shall make Tallies of Payments. Return of Mainpernors, Jurors, and Pledges. One Baron shall yearly inroll Payments in the Exchequer County; and hear Complaints against Sheriffs.	The whole act.
28 Edw. 1. Articuli super Cartas (Articles upon the Charters) c. 1	Confirmation of Charters Act 1300	Confirmation of the Great Charter and the Charter of the Forest. Commissioners to inquire of Offences done contrary to the Charters. Officers shall be attendant upon the Commissioners.	The whole act.
28 Edw. 1. Articuli super Cartas (Articles upon the Charters) c. 2	Purveyance	Purveyors. What they shall take. Payment thereof. Purveyors to show their Warrant; to take no more than is needful; to answer for Things taken. Punishment for undue Purveyance. Taking without Warrant, Felony. Purveyance made for the King's Wardrobe. Saving as to ancient Prises.	The whole act.
28 Edw. 1. Articuli super Cartas (Articles upon the Charters) c. 4	Common pleas	No Common Pleas in the Exchequer.	The whole act.
28 Edw. 1. Articuli super Cartas (Articles upon the Charters) c. 7	Constable of Dover Castle Act 1300	Of the Jurisdiction of the Constable of the Castle of Dover.	The whole act.
28 Edw. 1. Articuli super Cartas (Articles upon the Charters) c. 8	Election of sheriffs	Election of Sheriffs.	The whole act.
28 Edw. 1. Articuli super Cartas (Articles upon the Charters) c. 9	Juries	How Juries are to be impanelled.	The whole act.
28 Edw. 1. Articuli super Cartas (Articles upon the Charters) c. 14	Farming of bailiwicks, etc.	Of farming Bailiwicks and Hundreds.	The whole act.
28 Edw. 1. Articuli super Cartas (Articles upon the Charters) c. 15	Real actions	Summons and attachments in Plea of Land.	The whole act.
28 Edw. 1. Articuli super Cartas (Articles upon the Charters) c. 17	Observance of Statute of Winchester	Statute of Winchester enforced.	The whole act.
28 Edw. 1. Articuli super Cartas (Articles upon the Charters) c. 18	Wardship	Remedy against Escheators for Wastes in Wardships.	The whole act.
28 Edw. 1. Statutum de Appellatis (Statute for Persons appealed)	Appeals by Provors in Prison Act 1300	Statutum de Appellatis. A Statute for Persons appealed.	The whole act.
34 Edw. 1. Statutum de Moneta de conjunctim Feoffatis (Statute of Joint-Tenants)	Statutum de Moneta de conjunctim Feoffatis	Statutum de Moneta de conjunctim Feoffatis. Statute of Joint Tenants. — Except from "Forasmuch also as Pleas" to the end.	The whole act.
35 Edw. 1. Statutum Karlioli (Statute of Carlisle)	Abbeys and Alien Superiors Act 1307	Statutum Karlioli. The Statute of Carlisle	The whole act.
2 Edw. 2. De Prisis injust' non capiend' a Viris Ecclesiastic' seu aliis	De Prisis injust' non capiend' a Viris Ecclesiastic' seu aliis	De Prisis injust' non capiend' a Viris Ecclesiastic' seu aliis. Of the not taking undue Prises from Ecclesiastical Persons or others.	The whole act.
3 Edw. 2. Statutum apud Staunford (Statute of Stamford)	Statutum apud Staunford	Statutum apud Staunford. The Statute of Stamford.	The whole act.
9 Edw. 2. Articuli Cleri (Articles for the Clergy) Stat. 1. c. 4	Prohibition	Defamation.	The whole act.
9 Edw. 2. Articuli Cleri (Articles for the Clergy) Stat. 1. c. 10	Privilege of sanctuary	Protection of Persons fleeing unto the Church and abjuring the Realm.	The whole act.
9 Edw. 2. Stat. 1. Articuli Cleri (Articles for the Clergy) c. 11	Corodies, etc.	Religious Houses not to be unduly charged with Corrodies, Pensions, &c.	The whole act.
9 Edw. 2. Stat. 1. Articuli Cleri (Articles for the Clergy) c. 12	Excommunication	The King's Tenant excommunicate not privileged.	The whole act.
9 Edw. 2. Stat. 1. Articuli Cleri (Articles for the Clergy) c. 15	Privilege of sanctuary	A Clerk shall not be compelled to abjure.	The whole act.
9 Edw. 2. Stat. 1. Articuli Cleri (Articles for the Clergy) c. 16	Privilege of clergy	The Privilege of the Church shall not be denied to a Clerk becoming an Approver.	The whole act.
10 Edw. 2. De Statuto pro Clero inviolabiliter observando (Of inviolably observing the Statute for the Clergy)	Purveyance on the Clergy Act 1316	De Statuto p' Clero inviolabilit' obs'vād. Of inviolably observing the Statute for the Clergy.	The whole act.
12 Edw. 2. Statutum Eborac' (Statute of York) c. 1	Tenants in Assise of Novel disseisin may make Attornies	Tenants in Novel disseizin may make Attorney. Pleading by Bailiffs.	The whole act.
12 Edw. 2. Statutum Eborac' (Statute of York) c. 2	Process against the Witnesses to prove a deed denied	Inquests shall not be delayed by the absence of Witnesses to Deeds.	The whole act.
14 Edw. 2 Statutum Westm' iiii (Statute of Westminster the Fourth)	Sheriffs; juries	Statutum Westm' iiij. The Statute of Westminster; the Fourth.	The whole act.
16 Edw. 2 Statutum de forma mittendi Extractas ad Scaccarium (A Statute for Estreats of the Exchequer)	Statute for Estreats of the Exchequer	Statutum de forma mittendi Extractas ad Scaccarium. A Statute for Estreats of the Exchequer.	The whole act.
17 Edw. 2. Stat. 1 Ordinacio de Statu Terre Hib'n' f'ca (Ordinance made for the State of the Land of Ireland) c. 1	The King's officers in Ireland shall purchase no land there without the King's licence	The King's officers in Ireland shall purchase no land there without the King's licence.	The whole act.
17 Edw. 2. Stat. 1 Ordinacio de Statu Terre Hib'n' f'ca (Ordinance made for the State of the Land of Ireland) c. 2	In what case only purveyance may be made in Ireland	In what case only Purveyance may be made in Ireland.	The whole act.
17 Edw. 2. Stat. 1 Ordinacio de Statu Terre Hib'n' f'ca (Ordinance made for the State of the Land of Ireland) c. 3	Exporting of merchandise out of Ireland	Exporting of Merchandise out of Ireland.	The whole act.
17 Edw. 2. Stat. 1 Ordinacio de Statu Terre Hib'n' f'ca (Ordinance made for the State of the Land of Ireland) c. 4	Fees of a bill of grace	Fees of a Bill of Grace.	The whole act.
17 Edw. 2. Stat. 1 Ordinacio de Statu Terre Hib'n' f'ca (Ordinance made for the State of the Land of Ireland) c. 5	Fee of the Marshal	Fee of the Marshal.	The whole act.
17 Edw. 2. Stat. 1 Ordinacio de Statu Terre Hib'n' f'ca (Ordinance made for the State of the Land of Ireland) c. 6	Pardons and protections	Pardons and Protections.	The whole act.
17 Edw. 2. Stat. 1 Ordinacio de Statu Terre Hib'n' f'ca (Ordinance made for the State of the Land of Ireland) c. 7	The sealing of writs	The Sealing of Writs.	The whole act.
17 Edw. 2. Stat. 1 Ordinacio de Statu Terre Hib'n' f'ca (Ordinance made for the State of the Land of Ireland) c. 8	Adjournments of assizes of novel disseisin	Adjournments of Assizes of Novel disseisin.	The whole act.
Les Estatuz del Eschekere (Statutes of the Exchequer) c. 1	N/A	All Bailiffs, &c. shall account in the Exchequer.	The whole act.
Les Estatuz del Eschekere (Statutes of the Exchequer) c. 2	N/A	At what time they shall account.	The whole act.
Les Estatuz del Eschekere (Statutes of the Exchequer) c. 3	N/A	How Bailiffs of Franchises shall account.	The whole act.
Les Estatuz del Eschekere (Statutes of the Exchequer) c. 4	N/A	Accounts of the Justice of Chester and Bailiffs of the Isles.	The whole act.
Les Estatuz del Eschekere (Statutes of the Exchequer) c. 5	N/A	Sheriffs (except in five Counties) shall keep the King's Wards and Escheats, in their Shires.	The whole act.
Les Estatuz del Eschekere (Statutes of the Exchequer) c. 6	N/A	Three Surveyors of Wards, &c. Wards and Escheats let to Farm.	The whole act.
Les Estatuz del Eschekere (Statutes of the Exchequer) c. 7	N/A	Foreign Sheriffs Escheators in the five excepted Shires.	The whole act.
Les Estatuz del Eschekere (Statutes of the Exchequer) c. 8	N/A	Foreign Sheriffs Escheators in the five excepted Shires.	The whole act.
Les Estatuz del Eschekere (Statutes of the Exchequer) c. 9	N/A	Duty of the Surveyors.	The whole act.
Les Estatuz del Eschekere (Statutes of the Exchequer) c. 10	N/A	Collectors of the Customs on Wools.	The whole act.
Les Estatuz del Eschekere (Statutes of the Exchequer) c. 11	N/A	Keeper of the Wardrobe.	The whole act.
Les Estatuz del Eschekere (Statutes of the Exchequer) c. 13	N/A	Order of accounting.	The whole act.
Les Estatuz del Eschekere (Statutes of the Exchequer) c. 14	N/A	Deputy Officers in the Exchequer.	The whole act.
Les Estatuz del Eschekere (Statutes of the Exchequer) c. 15	N/A	Deputy Officers shall be sworn. Punishment of them for Misconduct.	The whole act.
Les Estatuz del Eschekere (Statutes of the Exchequer) c. 16	N/A	Offences shall be certified.	The whole act.
Les Estatuz del Eschekere (Statutes of the Exchequer) c. 17	N/A	Yearly Search as to deficient Accountants.	The whole act.
Les Estatuz del Eschekere (Statutes of the Exchequer) c. 18	N/A	Surveyors of the King's Works, to prevent false Allowances, &c.	The whole act.
Les Estatuz del Eschekere (Statutes of the Exchequer) c. 19	N/A	Estreats of Fines and Amerciaments shall be delivered into the Exchequer.	The whole act.
Les Estatuz del Eschekere (Statutes of the Exchequer) provisions inserted between c. 13 and c. 14	N/A	Also, the following portions of the Provisions inserted between c. 13, and c. 14, and headed Districciones le Scaccario; namely, — (1) From "And if any bring" to "Pledges" (2) From "Howbeit" to "Receipt"	The whole act.
Assisa Panis et Cervisie (The Assize of Bread and Ale)	Assize of Bread and Ale Act 1266	Assisa Panis et Cervisie, The Assize of Bread and Ale	The whole act.
Statutum de Pistoribus, etc. (Statute concerning Bakers, etc.)	Statute concerning Bakers, etc.	Statutum de Pistoribus, &c. Statute concerning Bakers, &c. — Except from "The Toll of a Mill" to "and if they do otherwise, they shall be grievously punished"	The whole act.
Assisa de Ponderibz et Mensuris (Assize of Weights and Measures)	Weights and Measures Act 1303	Assisa de Ponderibs et Mensuris. The Assize of Weights and Measures.	The whole act.
De Divisione Denariorum (Currency of halfpence and farthings)	Currency of halfpence and farthings	De Dimissione (seu divisione) denariorum.	The whole act.
Statutum de Admensuratione Terre (Statute for the Measuring of Land)	Statute for the Measuring of Land	Statutum de Admensuratione Terre. Statute for the Measuring of Land.	The whole act.
Compositio Ulnarum et Perticarum (Composition of Yards and Perches)	Statute of Ells and Perches	Compositio Ulnarum & Perticarum.	The whole act.
Dies Communes de Banco (General Days in Bank)	General Days in Bank	Dies Communes de Banco. General Days in Bank.	The whole act.
Dies Communes de Dote (General Days in Dower)	General Days in Dower Act 1266	Dies Communes de Dote. General Days in Dower.	The whole act.
Prohibitio formata de Statuto Articuli Cleri (A Prohibition made upon the Articles of the Clergy)	A Prohibition made upon the Articles of the Clergy	Prohibitio formata de Statuto Articuli Cleri. A Prohibition made upon the Articles of the Clergy.	The whole act.
Les Estatuz de Excestre (Statutes of Exeter)	Statutes of Exeter	Les Estatuz de Excestre, The Statute of Exeter.	The whole act.
Statutum super Vicecomitem et Clerlcos suos (Statute concerning the Sheriff and his Clerks)	Statute concerning the Sheriff and his Clerks	Statut' sup' Vic' & eorum cleric' suos. Statute concerning the Sheriff and his Clerks.	The whole act.
Modu Levandi Fines (The Manner of levying of Fines)	The Manner of levying of Fines	Modus levandi Fines. The Manner of Levying Fines.	The whole act.
Statutum de Finibus et Attornatis (Statute concerning Fines and Attorneys)	Levying of Fines, Attorneys Act 1322	Statut' de finibus et attornatis. Statute concerning Fines and Attornies.	The whole act.
Statutū de Protectionibus non allocandis (Statute against allowing Protections)	Statute against allowing Protections	Statutu de Proteccionibus no alloc'. Statute against allowing Protections.	The whole act.
Modus calumpniandi Esson' (The Manner of challenging Essoins)	The Manner of challenging Essoins	Modus calumpniandi Essonia. The Manner of challenging Essoins.	The whole act.
Statutum de Visu Terre, et Essonio de servitio domino Regis (Statute for View of Land, and Essoin in the King's Service)	Statute for View of Land, and Essoin in the King's Service	Statutu de visu t're & essoin de servicio dni Regis. Statue for View of Land; And Essoin in the King's Service.	The whole act.
Statutum de Magnis Assisis et Duellis (Statute concerning the Great Assizes and Battle)	Statute concerning the Great Assizes and Battle	Statutu de magnis Assis' et duellis. Statute concerning the Great Assises and Battle.	The whole act.
Statutum de Gaveleto in London (Statute of Gavelet in London)	Statute of Gavelet in London	Statutu de Gaveleto in London. Statute of Gavelet in London.	The whole act.
Prerogativa Regis (Of the King's Prerogative) c. 1	Wardship of Heir of the King's Tenant in Chief	Wardship of Heir of the King's Tenant in Chief.	The whole act.
Prerogativa Regis (Of the King's Prerogative) c. 2	Wardship of Heir of the King's Tenant	Marriage of Heir of the King's Tenant.	The whole act.
Prerogativa Regis (Of the King's Prerogative) c. 3	Premier Seisin of Land of the King's Tenant	Primer Seisin of Land of the King's Tenant.	The whole act.
Prerogativa Regis (Of the King's Prerogative) c. 4	Assignment of Dower to Widows of King's Tenants Of their Marriage	Assignment of Dower to Widows of King's Tenants. Of their Marriage.	The whole act.
Prerogativa Regis (Of the King's Prerogative) c. 5	Marriage of Heiresses	Marriage of Heiresses.	The whole act.
Prerogativa Regis (Of the King's Prerogative) c. 6	Homage for Lands, holden of the King, descending to Coparceners	Homage for Lands holden of the King, descending to Coparceners.	The whole act.
Prerogativa Regis (Of the King's Prerogative) c. 7	Wardship of Women married under Age	Wardship of Women married under Age.	The whole act.
Prerogativa Regis (Of the King's Prerogative) c. 8	Alienation of Lands holden in Chief	Alienation of Lands holden in Chief.	The whole act.
Prerogativa Regis (Of the King's Prerogative) c. 9	Alienation of Serjeanties	Alienation of Serjeanties	The whole act.
Prerogativa Regis (Of the King's Prerogative) c. 14	Escheat of Lands descending to Aliens	Escheats of Lands descended to Aliens.	The whole act.
Prerogativa Regis (Of the King's Prerogative) c. 15	Intrusion of the King's Tenant before Homage	Intrusion of the King's Tenant before Homage.	The whole act.
Modus faciendi Homagium et Fidelitatem (The Manner of doing Homage and Fealty)	The Manner of doing Homage and Fealty	Modus faciendi Homagium & Fidelitatem. The Manner of doing Homage and Fealty — Except from "When a Freeman shall do Fealty" to the end.	The whole act.
Statutum de respectu Milit' habendo (Statute for respiting of Knighthood)	Respiting of Knighthood Act 1307	Statutu de respectu Milit' n'ndo. Statute for respiting of Knighthood.	The whole act.
Statuta Armorum (The Statutes of Arms)	Statutes of Arms	Statutum Armorum. The Statutes of Arms.	The whole act.
Statutum de Sacramento Ministrorum Regis (Statute for Oaths of the King's Officers in the Eyre)	Statute for Oaths of the King's Officers in the Eyre	Statutū de Sacram'to Ministror' Reg'. Statute for Oaths of the King's Officers in the Eyre.	The whole act.
Capitula Itineris (The Articles of the Eyre)	Articles of the Eyre	Capitula Itineris. The Articles of the Eyre.	The whole act.
Capitula Escaetrie (Articles of the Office of Escheator)	Articles of the Office of Escheator	Capitula Escaetrie. Articles of the Office of Escheator.	The whole act.
Extenta Manerii (For Extending or Surveying a Manor)	For Extending or Surveying a Manor	Extenta Manerii. For extending or surveying a Manor.	The whole act.
Articuli Inquisic' super Statutum Wyntoniensi (Articles of Inquiry upon the Statute of Winchester)	Articles of Inquiry upon the Statute of Winchester	Articuli Inquisic' super Statut' Wynton'. Articles of Inquiry upon the Statute of Winchester.	The whole act.
Le Serement du Visconte (The Oath of the Sheriff)	Oath of the Sheriff Act 1306	Le Sement du Visconte. The Oath of the Sheriff.	The whole act.
Forma Juramenti illorum de Concillio Regis (Form of the Oath of those of the King's Council)	Form of the Oath of those of the King's Council	Forma Juramenti' illor' de cons' R. Form of the Oath of those of the King's Council.	The whole act.
Juramentum Episcoporum (The Oath of the Bishops)	Oath of the Bishops	Juramentu' Ep'or'. The Oath of the Bishops.	The whole act.
Juramentum Escaetorum (The Oath of Escheators)	Oath of Escheators	Juramentum Escaetorum. The Oath of Escheators.	The whole act.
Abjuratio et Juramentum Latronum (The Abjuration and Oath of Thieves)	Abjuration and Oath of Thieves	Abjuratio et juramentum Latronum. The Abjuration and Oath of Thieves.	The whole act.
1 Edw. 3 Stat. 1. c. 6	Attaint	An Attaint as well upon the Principal, as upon the Damages, in Trespass.	The whole act.
1 Edw. 3 Stat. 1. c. 7	Appeal by Prisoners	Inquiry concerning Gaolers compelling Prisoners to appeal.	The whole act.
1 Edw. 3 Stat. 2. c. 1	Confirmation of charters, etc.	Confirmation of Charters. Perambulations of Forests.	The whole act.
1 Edw. 3 Stat. 2. c. 2	Forest	House-boot and Hey-boot within the Forest. Seising of Bishops' Temporalties, except from the beginning to "Foresters."	The whole act.
1 Edw. 3 Stat. 2. c. 3	King's Pardon Act 1327	The late King's Pardon of Issues and Amerciaments. The Jews Debts pardoned.	The whole act.
1 Edw. 3 Stat. 2. c. 4	Crown debts	King's Debts shall be paid according to the Debtor's Estates.	The whole act.
1 Edw. 3 Stat. 2. c. 5	Military service	Of Military Service.	The whole act.
1 Edw. 3 Stat. 2. c. 6	Taxation	Abuses in taxing Aids to the King.	The whole act.
1 Edw. 3 Stat. 2. c. 7	Conveyance of soldiers	Charges in the Conveyance of Soldiers.	The whole act.
1 Edw. 3 Stat. 2. c. 8	Beaupleader	Stat. Marlb., 52 Hen. III. chapter 11, confirmed.	The whole act.
1 Edw. 3 Stat. 2. c. 10	Corodies, etc.	The King's Demand of Corodics, &c.	The whole act.
1 Edw. 3 Stat. 2. c. 11	Prohibition	Prohibition to the Spiritual Court in Suits against Indicters of Excommunication.	The whole act.
1 Edw. 3 Stat. 2. c. 12	Tenure in capite, etc.	Fine for Alienation of Lands holden of the King.	The whole act.
1 Edw. 3 Stat. 2. c. 13	Tenure in capite, etc.	Purchasing of Lands holden of the King as of some Honour.	The whole act.
1 Edw. 3 Stat. 2. c. 15	Military service	None shall be bound by Writing to come with Arms to the King.	The whole act.
2 Edw. 3. Statute of Northampton c. 1	Confirmation of charters	The Charters.	The whole act.
2 Edw. 3. Statute of Northampton c. 2	Pardons for Felony, Justices of Assize, etc. Act 1328	Pardons for Felony. Justices of Assize and Gaoldelivery. Oyers and Terminers: — From "It is ordained" to "Misfortune."	The whole act.
2 Edw. 3. Statute of Northampton c. 6	Confirmation of statutes, etc.	The Statute of Wynton, 13 Edw. 1. confirmed, &c.	The whole act.
2 Edw. 3. Statute of Northampton c. 7	Inquiry of past felons, etc.	Justices assigned to inquire of Felonies, Robberies, &c.	The whole act.
2 Edw. 3. Statute of Northampton c. 9	Staples Act 1328	All Staples shall cease.	The whole act.
2 Edw. 3. Statute of Northampton c. 10	Pardon of fines	Pardon of Fines for Writs in Chancery.	The whole act.
2 Edw. 3. Statute of Northampton c. 11	Common Bench	The Common Bench not to be removed without Warning.	The whole act.
2 Edw. 3. Statute of Northampton c. 13	Process for Past Trespasses	Trespass in the late King's Time.	The whole act.
2 Edw. 3. Statute of Northampton c. 17	Writs of deceit	Writ of Deceit.	The whole act.
4 Edw. 3. c. 1	Confirmation of charters & statutes	Charters and Statutes confirmed.	The whole act.
4 Edw. 3. c. 3	Civil Procedure Act 1330	Purveyance.	The whole act.
4 Edw. 3. c. 4	Purveyance	The Statute 28 Edw. 1. c. 2. touching Purveyors, confirmed.	The whole act.
4 Edw. 3. c. 5	Pardon of fines, etc.	Pardon for certain Fines and Grants.	The whole act.
4 Edw. 3. c. 6	Confirmation of 35 Edw. 1. Stat. Karl.	The Statute 35 Edw. 1. st. 1. confirmed.	The whole act.
4 Edw. 3. c. 8	Passages at the ports	Fare of Passages at the Ports.	The whole act. (Note: This act was not included in the Statute Law Revision Act 1863 (26 & 27 Vict. c. 125). This act was repealed for England and Wales by the Statute Law Revision and Civil Procedure Act 1881 (44 & 45 Vict. c. 59))
4 Edw. 3. c. 10	Receipt of offenders by sheriffs, etc.	Sheriffs and Gaolers shall receive Offenders without taking anything.	The whole act.
4 Edw. 3. c. 12	Assay, etc. of wines	Wines shall be essayed, and sold at reasonable Prices.	The whole act.
4 Edw. 3. c. 13	Pardons	Confirmation of the Statute 2 Edw. 3. c. 2. touching Pardons.	The whole act.
4 Edw. 3. c. 14	Parliament	Annual Parliaments.	The whole act.
4 Edw. 3. c. 15	Farming of hundreds by sheriffs	Sheriffs shall let their Hundreds for the old Form.	The whole act.
5 Edw. 3. c. 1	Confirmation of charters	The Charters.	The whole act.
5 Edw. 3. c. 2	Purveyance, Marchalsea	Purveyance. Recital of Statute 4 Edw. 3. c. 3, 4., 28 Edw. 1. c. 2. Tallies of Purveyance, Form of Commissions. Inquests taken in the Marshal's Court. Dower in the Marshal's Court.	The whole act.
5 Edw. 3. c. 3	Confirmation of 35 Edw. 1 Stat. Carlisle	The Statute 35 Edw. I. st. 1. confirmed.	The whole act.
5 Edw. 3. c. 6	Attaints	Process in Attaint.	The whole act.
5 Edw. 3. c. 7	Attaints	Attaint in Trespass, if the Damages pass Forty Shillings.	The whole act.
9 Edw. 3. Stat. 1 c. 1	Foreign and other merchants	Rotul' de Statuto edito apud Ebor'; anno r.r. E. t'cii post Conquestū nono Roll of The Statute made at York; In the Ninth Year of the Reign of K. Edward, the Third after the Conquest Statute the First. — Except Chapter Three. — Executors shall not fourch by Essoin. Process against Executors. Judgment against all, where some only plead.	The whole act.
9 Edw. 3. Stat. 1 c. 2	Nonplevin	Rotul' de Statuto edito apud Ebor'; anno r.r. E. t'cii post Conquestū nono Roll of The Statute made at York; In the Ninth Year of the Reign of K. Edward, the Third after the Conquest Statute the First. — Except Chapter Three. — Executors shall not fourch by Essoin. Process against Executors. Judgment against all, where some only plead.	The whole act.
9 Edw. 3. Stat. 1 c. 4	Trial of a Deed dated where the King's Writ runeth not.	Rotul' de Statuto edito apud Ebor'; anno r.r. E. t'cii post Conquestū nono Roll of The Statute made at York; In the Ninth Year of the Reign of K. Edward, the Third after the Conquest Statute the First. — Except Chapter Three. — Executors shall not fourch by Essoin. Process against Executors. Judgment against all, where some only plead.	The whole act.
9 Edw. 3. Stat. 1 c. 5	Which Justices shall send their Records and Process determined into the Exchequer.	Rotul' de Statuto edito apud Ebor'; anno r.r. E. t'cii post Conquestū nono Roll of The Statute made at York; In the Ninth Year of the Reign of K. Edward, the Third after the Conquest Statute the First. — Except Chapter Three. — Executors shall not fourch by Essoin. Process against Executors. Judgment against all, where some only plead.	The whole act.
10 Edw. 3. Stat. 1 c. 1	A Confirmation of former Statutes.	Anno X^{mo}, Statute the First.	The whole act.
10 Edw. 3. Stat. 1 c. 2	Pardons shall not be granted contrary to the Statute of 2 Edw. III. cap. 2.	Anno X^{mo}, Statute the First.	The whole act.
10 Edw. 3. Stat. 1 c. 3	He that hath a Pardon of Felony shall find Sureties for his good abearing.	Anno X^{mo}, Statute the First.	The whole act.
10 Edw. 3. Stat. 2 c. 1	Things Purveyed for the King's House shall be praised, and Tallies made thereof.	Statute the Second.	The whole act.
10 Edw. 3. Stat. 2 c. 2	Of what People Enquests in the Marshals Court of the King's House shall be taken.	Statute the Second.	The whole act.
10 Edw. 3. Stat. 2 c. 3	Error in the Marshals Courts shall be reversed in the King's Bench.	Statute the Second.	The whole act.
10 Edw. 3. Stat. 2 c. 4	The Sheriff shall make Purveyance for the King's Horses.	Statute the Second.	The whole act.
10 Edw. 3. Stat. 2 c. 5	Certain Persons shall he appointed to hear the Offences of the Keepers of the King's Horses.	Statute the Second.	The whole act.
11 Edw. 3. c. 1	Wool Act 1337		The whole act.
11 Edw. 3. c. 2	Cloth Act 1337		The whole act.
11 Edw. 3. c. 3	Importation Act 1337		The whole act.
11 Edw. 3. c. 4	Fur Act 1337		The whole act.
11 Edw. 3. c. 5	Cloth (No. 2) Act 1337		The whole act.
14 Edw. 3. Stat. 1. c. 2	Pardon of chattels of felons, etc.	The King's Pardon of Chattels of Felons, of Fines, &c.	The whole act.
14 Edw. 3. Stat. 1. c. 3	Pardon of Crown debts	Pardon of divers Debts, &c. due to the King.	The whole act.
14 Edw. 3. Stat. 1. c. 4	Engleschrie Act 1340	Engleschrie and Presentments thereof abolished.	The whole act.
14 Edw. 3. Stat. 1. c. 5	Delays in courts	Commissioners appointed to redress Delays, &c., of Courts of Justice. Adjournment shall be into Parliament in case of Difficulty. Chancellor, Judges, &c., shall take Oaths of Office.	The whole act.
14 Edw. 3. Stat. 1. c. 10	Custody of gaols, etc.	Sheriffs shall have the keeping of the Gaols.	The whole act.
14 Edw. 3. Stat. 1. c. 11	Clerks of statutes merchant	Clerks of Statutes Merchant shall be resident and sufficient.	The whole act.
14 Edw. 3. Stat. 1. c. 12	Measures and weights	One Measure and One Weight throughout England. Standards to be sent into every County. Persons shall be assigned to survey Measures; who shall levy the Penalties, &c. Saving for the Clerk of the Market; and Lords of Franchises.	The whole act.
14 Edw. 3. Stat. 1. c. 13	Tenure in capite	Escheators and Commissioners to inquire of the King's Wards. Return of Extent into Chancery. The Next of Kin to the King's Ward may take his Land in Ferm. Action of Waste against the Fermors.	The whole act.
14 Edw. 3. Stat. 1. c. 15	Pardon for felony	No Pardon for Felony inconsistent with the King's Oath.	The whole act.
14 Edw. 3. Stat. 1. c. 17	Real actions	Juris Utrum.	The whole act.
14 Edw. 3. Stat. 1. c. 18	Real actions	Demandant may aver the Death of the Vouchee.	The whole act.
14 Edw. 3. Stat. 1. c. 19	Purveyance Act 1340	Purveyances for the Royal Houses to be by Warrant. Purveyors to take nothing without the Owner's Consent. Purveyance for the Wars. Purveyance for the King's Horses. Purveyance for the King's Dogs.	The whole act.
14 Edw. 3. Stat. 1. c. 20	Taxation	A subsidy granted to the King, of the Ninth Lamb, the Ninth Fleece, and the Ninth Sheaf. In Cities and Boroughs of the ninth Part of all Goods. Elsewhere of the Fifteenth. Poor Persons excepted.	The whole act.
14 Edw. 3. Stat. 1. c. 21	Taxation, etc.	A subsidy granted to the King on Wool, Woolfells, and Leather Merchandizes exported, for a certain Period. The old Custom only to be taken afterwards. Exporters of Wool shall give Security to import Silver in Return. Cocketing Wools. No other Custom shall be levied but by assent of Parliament.	The whole act.
14 Edw. 3. Stat. 2 c. 1	Taxation, etc. Act 1340	Statute the Second.	The whole act.
14 Edw. 3. Stat. 2 c. 2	Taxation, etc. Act 1340	Statute the Second.	The whole act.
14 Edw. 3. Stat. 4 c. 1	A Statute for the Clergy	Statute the Fourth.	The whole act.
14 Edw. 3. Stat. 4 c. 2	A Statute for the Clergy	Statute the Fourth.	The whole act.
14 Edw. 3. Stat. 4 c. 3	A Statute for the Clergy	Statute the Fourth.	The whole act.
14 Edw. 3. Stat. 4 c. 4	A Statute for the Clergy	Statute the Fourth.	The whole act.
15 Edw. 3. Stat. 2	Repeal of 15 Edw. 3. Stat. 1	Statute the Second.	The whole act.
15 Edw. 3. Stat. 3 c. 1	Subsidy	Statute the Third.	The whole act.
15 Edw. 3. Stat. 3 c. 2	Subsidy	Statute the Third.	The whole act.
15 Edw. 3. Stat. 3 c. 3	Subsidy	Statute the Third.	The whole act.
15 Edw. 3. Stat. 3 c. 4	Subsidy	Statute the Third.	The whole act.
15 Edw. 3. Stat. 3 c. 5	Subsidy	Statute the Third.	The whole act.
15 Edw. 3. Stat. 3 c. 6	Subsidy	Statute the Third.	The whole act.
15 Edw. 3. Stat. 3 c. 7	Subsidy	Statute the Third.	The whole act.
18 Edw. 3. Stat. 2.part preceding c. 1	Two quinzimes granted to the King by the commonality, and two dismes by cities and boroughs, to be paid in two years, towards his wars in France and Scotland.	Grant to the King of Two Fifteenths and Two Tenths by the Commons.	The whole act.
18 Edw. 3. Stat. 2. c. 1	Commissions of new enquiries	Commissions of new Inquiries repealed; Saving for Indictments for certain Offences already commenced.	The whole act.
18 Edw. 3. Stat. 2. c. 3	Freedom of trade	All Persons may buy Wools. The Sea open to all Merchants.	The whole act.
18 Edw. 3. Stat. 2. c. 4	Weights and measures	Commissions to assay Weights and Measures repealed. Commissioners to account.	The whole act.
18 Edw. 3. Stat. 2. c. 6	Currency	New Money. Gold and Silver to be coined at York, &c. Places of Exchange. Exchanges ascertained.	The whole act.
18 Edw. 3. Stat. 2. c. 7	Confirmation of statutes, etc.	Confirmation of the Statutes regulating Purveyance; and the Court of the Marshalseea. Pay of Soldiers.	The whole act.
18 Edw. 3. Stat. 3. c. 4	Purveyance	Exemption of the Clergy from Purveyance.	The whole act.
18 Edw. 3. Stat. 3. c. 6	Spiritual jurisdiction	Commissions, to enquire of Spiritual Judges, repealed.	The whole act.
18 Edw. 3. Stat. 3. c. 7	Scire facias for tithes	No Scire facias against a Clerk for Dismes. Saving of the King's Right.	The whole act.
20 Edw. 3. Ordinance for the Justices c. 5	Maintenance	Lords and Great Men shall put away Maintainers of Quarrels.	The whole act.
23 Edw. 3. Ordinance of Labourers 1349 c. 1	Every person able in body under the age of sixty years, not having to live on, being required, shall be bound to serve him that doth require him, or else be committed to the gaol, until he find surety to serve.	The Statute of Labourers.	The whole act.
23 Edw. 3. Ordinance of Labourers 1349 c. 2	If a workman or servant depart from service before the time agreed upon, he shall be imprisoned.	The Statute of Labourers.	The whole act.
23 Edw. 3. Ordinance of Labourers 1349 c. 3	The old wages, and no more, shall be given to servants.	The Statute of Labourers.	The whole act.
23 Edw. 3. Ordinance of Labourers 1349 c. 4	If the lord of a town or manor do offend against the statute in any point, he shall forfeit the treble value.	The Statute of Labourers.	The whole act.
23 Edw. 3. Ordinance of Labourers 1349 c. 5	If any artificer or workman take more wages than were wont to be paid, he shall be committed to the gaol.	The Statute of Labourers.	The whole act.
23 Edw. 3. Ordinance of Labourers 1349 c. 6	Victuals shall be sold at reasonable prices.	The Statute of Labourers.	The whole act.
23 Edw. 3. Ordinance of Labourers 1349 c. 7	No person shall give any thing to a beggar that is able to labour.	The Statute of Labourers.	The whole act.
23 Edw. 3. Ordinance of Labourers 1349 c. 8	Labourers Artificers, etc. Act 1349	The Statute of Labourers.	The whole act.
25 Edw. 3. Stat. 2 Statute of Labourers 1351 c. 1	The year and day's wages of servants and labourers in husbandry.	Statute the Second.	The whole act.
25 Edw. 3. Stat. 2 Statute of Labourers 1351 c. 2	How much shall be given for threshing all sorts of corn by the quarter. None shall depart from the town in summer where he dwelt in winter.	Statute the Second.	The whole act.
25 Edw. 3. Stat. 2 Statute of Labourers 1351 c. 3	The wages of several sorts of artificers and labourers.	Statute the Second.	The whole act.
25 Edw. 3. Stat. 2 Statute of Labourers 1351 c. 4	Shoes, &c. shall he sold as in the 20th year of King Edward the 3d. Artificers sworn to use their crafts as they did in the 20th year of the same King.	Statute the Second.	The whole act.
25 Edw. 3. Stat. 2 Statute of Labourers 1351 c. 5	The several punishments of persons offending against this statute.	Statute the Second.	The whole act.
25 Edw. 3. Stat. 2 Statute of Labourers 1351 c. 6	Sheriffs, constables, bailiffs, gaolers, nor other officers, shall exact any thing of the same servants. The forfeitures of servants shall be employed to the aid of dismes and quinzimes granted to the King by the commons.	Statute the Second.	The whole act.
25 Edw. 3. Stat. 2 Statute of Labourers 1351 c. 7	The justices shall hold their sessions four times a year, and at all times needful. Servants which flee from one country to another shall be committed to prison.	Statute the Second.	The whole act.
25 Edw. 3. Stat. 3 c. 1	The aulneger shall be sworn to do his duty. The penalty if he offend.	Statute the Third.	The whole act.
25 Edw. 3. Stat. 3 c. 2	Merchants strangers may buy and sell without disturbance.	Statute the Third.	The whole act.
25 Edw. 3. Stat. 3 c. 3	The penalty of him that doth forestal wares, merchandise, or victual.	Statute the Third.	The whole act.
25 Edw. 3. Stat. 3 c. 4	New wears shall be pulled down, and not repaired.	Statute the Third.	The whole act.
25 Edw. 3. Stat. 5. c. 1	Purveyance	Corn shall be taken by Purveyors by Measure striked. Things taken by Purveyors shall be appraised at the King's Price. Values of the Goods taken. Punishment for undue Purveyance under Stat. 5 Edw. 3. c. 2. Purveyors' Commissions shall be under the Great or Privy Seal.	The whole act.
25 Edw. 3. Stat. 5. c. 6	Purveyance	Purveyors shall not take Trees about the Mansion.	The whole act.
25 Edw. 3. Stat. 5. c. 8	Finding of men at arms	No finding of Men of Arms, but by Tenure, or Grant in Parliament.	The whole act.
25 Edw. 3. Stat. 5. c. 9	Weights	Auncel Weight abolished. Goods shall be weighed by Balance.	The whole act.
25 Edw. 3. Stat. 5. c. 10	Measures	Magna Carta, chapter 25, respecting Measures recited and enforced. Justices shall inquire of and punish the Offenders. Saving of Franchises.	The whole act.
25 Edw. 3. Stat. 5. c. 11	Aids	Aid to make the King's Son Knight, and to marry his Daughter.	The whole act.
25 Edw. 3. Stat. 5. c. 12	Exchange of gold and silver	None shall take Profit by Exchange of Gold or Silver.	The whole act.
25 Edw. 3. Stat. 5. c. 13	Gold and silver coin	The current Coin shall not be impaired.	The whole act.
25 Edw. 3. Stat. 5. c. 15	Purveyance	The Penalty of Purveyors taking more Sheep before Shearing Time than are wanted.	The whole act.
25 Edw. 3. Stat. 5. c. 16	Real actions	Exception of Nontenure of Parcel.	The whole act.
25 Edw. 3. Stat. 5. c. 17	Process of Exigent Act 1351	Process of Exigent in Debts, Detinue, and Replevin.	The whole act.
25 Edw. 3. Stat. 5. c. 18	Villainage	Villainage may be pleaded, and a Villaine seized, pending Writ of Libertate probanda.	The whole act.
25 Edw. 3. Stat. 5. c. 19	Crown debtors	The King's Debtors suable notwithstanding Protection. Stay of Execution until Payment of King's Debt; or the Creditors undertake for it.	The whole act.
25 Edw. 3. Stat. 5. c. 20	Coinage	Plate shall be received at the Mint, and Coin delivered, by Weight.	The whole act.
25 Edw. 3. Stat. 5. c. 21	Purveyance	Abuses by the King's Butlers in Purveyance of Wine. Regulations therein. Punishment of the Butlers.	The whole act.
25 Edw. 3. Stat. 5. c. 23	Lombards	Companies of Lombards answerable for the Debts of their Fellows.	The whole act.
25 Edw. 3. Stat. 6. An Ordinance for the Clergy c. 2	Repeal of 14 Edw. 3 Stat. 4. c. 2	A repeal of the Statute of 14 Edw. 3. Stat. 4. cap. 2., touching the King's Presentation to a Church, in another's Right.	The whole act.
25 Edw. 3. Stat. 6. An Ordinance for the Clergy c. 6	Temporalities of prelates	Bishops' Temporalties shall not be seized for a Contempt.	The whole act.
25 Edw. 3. Stat. 7 Statutum de Forma levationis Decime-quinte (Statute of the Form of levying of the Fifteenth)	Statute of the Form of levying of the Fifteenth	Statutum de Forma levationis Decime quinte. The Statute of the Form of levying of the Fifteenth. Statute the Seventh.	The whole act.
25 Edw. 3 Artic. p. Clero. resp. (This Article for the Clergy is respited until the next Parliament)	This Article for the Clergy is respited until the next Parliament	This Article for the Clergy is respited until the next Parliament.	The whole act.
27 Edw. 3. Stat. 1. Statute against Anullers of Judgments of the King's Court c. 4	Cloths	The Mischief resulting from Forfeiture of Cloths not measuring the Assize; the King's Release of such Forfeitures. Cloths under the Assize shall be allowed for in Price. Aulnager's Fee for every Cloth and half Cloth sold. A Subsidy granted to the King of every Cloth. Cloths put to Sale not sealed shall be forfeited.	The whole act.
27 Edw. 3. Stat. 1. Statute against Anullers of Judgments of the King's Court c. 6	Importation of wine	Merchants may bring their Wines to English ports.	The whole act.
27 Edw. 3. Stat. 2 Ordinance of the Staples 1353 c. 1	Where the staple for England, Wales and Ireland shall be kept. Whither merchandises of the staple shall be carried, and what custom shall be paid for them.	The Ordinance of the Staples. Statute the Second.	The whole act.
27 Edw. 3. Stat. 2 Ordinance of the Staples 1353 c. 2	Merchants strangers may come into, and depart forth of the realm with their goods, and none of them shall be taken by the King's purveyors.	The Ordinance of the Staples. Statute the Second.	The whole act.
27 Edw. 3. Stat. 2 Ordinance of the Staples 1353 c. 3	All persons may buy wools, fells, &c. so that they bring them to the staple. It shall be felony for an English, Welsh, or Irish merchant to transport wool, &c.	The Ordinance of the Staples. Statute the Second.	The whole act.
27 Edw. 3. Stat. 2 Ordinance of the Staples 1353 c. 4	None going unto, or returning from the staple, shall be disturbed by purveyors.	The Ordinance of the Staples. Statute the Second.	The whole act.
27 Edw. 3. Stat. 2 Ordinance of the Staples 1353 c. 5	None of the King's justices shall take cognisance of things belonging to the staple.	The Ordinance of the Staples. Statute the Second.	The whole act.
27 Edw. 3. Stat. 2 Ordinance of the Staples 1353 c. 6	None of the King's officers shall meddle where the staples be.	The Ordinance of the Staples. Statute the Second.	The whole act.
27 Edw. 3. Stat. 2 Ordinance of the Staples 1353 c. 7	Licences granted to carry merchandises forth of the realm shall be void.	The Ordinance of the Staples. Statute the Second.	The whole act.
27 Edw. 3. Stat. 2 Ordinance of the Staples 1353 c. 8	The jurisdiction of the mayor and constables of the staple. All people of the staple shall be ruled by the law-merchant, and not by the common law.	The Ordinance of the Staples. Statute the Second.	The whole act.
27 Edw. 3. Stat. 2 Ordinance of the Staples 1353 c. 9	The effect of a recognisance knowledged in the staple for recovery of a debt.	The Ordinance of the Staples. Statute the Second.	The whole act.
27 Edw. 3. Stat. 2 Ordinance of the Staples 1353 c. 10	There shall be but one weight, measure and yard through the realm.	The Ordinance of the Staples. Statute the Second.	The whole act.
27 Edw. 3. Stat. 2 Ordinance of the Staples 1353 c. 11	The penalty for forestalling of merchandises before they come to the staple.	The Ordinance of the Staples. Statute the Second.	The whole act.
27 Edw. 3. Stat. 2 Ordinance of the Staples 1353 c. 12	The penalty of selling wool, &c. to a Scottishman to be carried into Scotland.	The Ordinance of the Staples. Statute the Second.	The whole act.
27 Edw. 3. Stat. 2 Ordinance of the Staples 1353 c. 13	A remedy where a merchant's goods be robbed or perished on the sea.	The Ordinance of the Staples. Statute the Second.	The whole act.
27 Edw. 3. Stat. 2 Ordinance of the Staples 1353 c. 14	Merchants may bring in gold or silver to the King's exchanges, and carry out as much.	The Ordinance of the Staples. Statute the Second.	The whole act.
27 Edw. 3. Stat. 2 Ordinance of the Staples 1353 c. 15	Indentures shall be made between carriers of wool by the water, and the bailiffs of towns where they load them; which carriers shall be sworn and bound to carry them to the staple.	The Ordinance of the Staples. Statute the Second.	The whole act.
27 Edw. 3. Stat. 2 Ordinance of the Staples 1353 c. 16	Houses shall be set for reasonable rents in staple-towns, imposed by the mayor, &c.	The Ordinance of the Staples. Statute the Second.	The whole act.
27 Edw. 3. Stat. 2 Ordinance of the Staples 1353 c. 17	A merchant stranger not be impeached for another's debt but upon good cause. Merchants of enemies countries shall sell their goods in convenient time, and depart.	The Ordinance of the Staples. Statute the Second.	The whole act.
27 Edw. 3. Stat. 2 Ordinance of the Staples 1353 c. 18	Merchants of Ireland or Wales may bring their merchandises to the staples of England.	The Ordinance of the Staples. Statute the Second.	The whole act.
27 Edw. 3. Stat. 2 Ordinance of the Staples 1353 c. 19	None shall lose his goods by his servants offence. Speedy justice shall be done from day to day, and from hour to hour.	The Ordinance of the Staples. Statute the Second.	The whole act.
27 Edw. 3. Stat. 2 Ordinance of the Staples 1353 c. 20	Merchants strangers taken in the King's protection; and for their wrongs shall recover double damages.	The Ordinance of the Staples. Statute the Second.	The whole act.
27 Edw. 3. Stat. 2 Ordinance of the Staples 1353 c. 21	A mayor and two constables shall be chosen yearly in every staple-town: and their authority.	The Ordinance of the Staples. Statute the Second.	The whole act.
27 Edw. 3. Stat. 2 Ordinance of the Staples 1353 c. 22	Correctors shall be appointed in the staple-towns to make and record bargains.	The Ordinance of the Staples. Statute the Second.	The whole act.
27 Edw. 3. Stat. 2 Ordinance of the Staples 1353 c. 23	The officers of the staple, and merchants repairing to, shall be sworn to maintain the staple, and the laws and customs of it.	The Ordinance of the Staples. Statute the Second.	The whole act.
27 Edw. 3. Stat. 2 Ordinance of the Staples 1353 c. 24	Two merchants aliens shall be chosen to be associate in judgment to the mayor and constables. And six mediators of questions between buyers and sellers shall be chosen.	The Ordinance of the Staples. Statute the Second.	The whole act.
27 Edw. 3. Stat. 2 Ordinance of the Staples 1353 c. 25	It shall be felony to make any conspiracy which may return to the disturbance of the staple.	The Ordinance of the Staples. Statute the Second.	The whole act.
27 Edw. 3. Stat. 2 Ordinance of the Staples 1353 c. 26	Credit shall be given to letters, or the merchants oaths, of the value of their goods.	The Ordinance of the Staples. Statute the Second.	The whole act.
27 Edw. 3. Stat. 2 Ordinance of the Staples 1353 c. 27	The forfeiture of those which before this statute have transported their wools, &c.	The Ordinance of the Staples. Statute the Second.	The whole act.
27 Edw. 3. Stat. 2 Ordinance of the Staples 1353 c. 28	The liberties of the staple confirmed, notwithstanding the franchises of others; but in fairs, markets, hundreds, leets, &c.	The Ordinance of the Staples. Statute the Second.	The whole act.
28 Edw. 3. c. 1	Confirmation of charters, etc.	Charters and Liberties confirmed.	The whole act.
28 Edw. 3. c. 4	Tenure in capite	How the King shall be satisfied of the mean Rates of those Lands which come to his Hands by the Death of his Tenants.	The whole act.
28 Edw. 3. c. 5	Exportation of iron	Iron shall not be exported. Price of Iron.	The whole act. (Note: This act was already repealed by Repeal of Acts Concerning Importation Act 1822 (3 Geo. 4. c. 41))
28 Edw. 3. c. 8	Attaint	Attaint given in all Cases of Trespass.	The whole act.
28 Edw. 3. c. 11	Confirmation, etc. of 13 Edw. 1 Stat. Wynton. cc. 1, 2	Increase of Murders and Robberies. Confirmation and Amendment of the Statute of Winchester, 13 Edw. 1., chapter 1, 2.	The whole act.
28 Edw. 3. c. 12	Purveyance	Purveyances to the King's Use under xx. s. shall be paid for directly: All others within a Quarter of a Year.	The whole act.
28 Edw. 3. c. 13	Confirmation, etc., of 27 Ed. 3. St. 2 Act 1354	The Statute of the Staple, 27 Edw. 3. Statute 2, confirmed, with certain Amendments. Warranty of packing of Wools repealed. All Inquests shall be de Medietate Linguæ, wherever Aliens are Parties. The Freedom of Alien Merchants secured in coming to England and selling their Goods. Penalty on forestalling Foreign Merchandise. Customs shall be paid only for Goods sold.	The whole act.
28 Edw. 3. c. 14	The staple	Showing of Wools at the Staple; on what Days; within what Distance of the Staple. Saving of Home-grown Wools.	The whole act.
31 Edw. 3. Stat. 1. c. 1	Confirmation of charters	Charters confirmed.	The whole act.
31 Edw. 3. Stat. 1. c. 4	Probate of testaments	Extortion of Bishop's Officers on Probate of Testaments. The Bishops shall amend the same; or the King's Justices shall enquire thereof.	The whole act.
31 Edw. 3. Stat. 1. c. 6	Franchises	Fines from Labourers given to Lords of Franchises.	The whole act.
31 Edw. 3. Stat. 1. c. 7	The Statute of Labourers, the staple	Statute of Labourers extended to London, &c. Justices assigned to try Offences against the Staple.	The whole act.
31 Edw. 3. Stat. 1. c. 8	Wool	Exportation of Wool permitted for a limited Time. Refuse of Wool. Contents of Sack and Stone of Wool. Wool not to be sold on the Staple; if not sold within forty Days, may be exported, &c.	The whole act.
31 Edw. 3. Stat. 1. c. 10	Default of victuallers in London	The Mayor and Aldermen of London may reform the Defaults of Victuallers there.	The whole act.
31 Edw. 3. Stat. 1. c. 12	Exchequer Chamber	Error from the Exchequer shall be examined by the Chancellor and Treasurer.	The whole act.
31 Edw. 3. Stat. 1. c. 13	Pardon, taxation	The King's Pardon to the Commons of the Escapes and Chattels of Felons. A Grant to the King of a Fifteenth; Free from Queen-gold.	The whole act.
31 Edw. 3. Stat. 4 An Ordinance made for the Estate of the Land of Ireland (Ordinatio facta pro terrae Hibernie)	Ordinance made for the Estate of the Land of Ireland	An Ordinance made for the Estate of the Land of Ireland. Statute the Fourth.	The whole act.
34 Edw. 3. c. 2	Purveyance	No Purveyance, except for the King, the Queen, and the King's eldest Son.	The whole act.
34 Edw. 3. c. 3	Purveyance	When Purveyances, &c. for the Queen, &c. shall be paid for.	The whole act.
34 Edw. 3. c. 5	Weights and Measures Act 1361	Justices of the Peace shall inquire of Weights and Measures, according to the Statute 25 Edw. III. stat. 5. ch. 9.	The whole act.
34 Edw. 3. c. 6	Measures	All measures shall be according to the King's standard, &c . Contents of the Quarter measures of corn shall be striked saving the rents of Lords Justices shall be assigned to enquire thereof. Saving of Franchises. Proclamation thereof.	The whole act. (Note: This act was not included in the Statute Law Revision Act 1863 (26 & 27 Vict. c. 125). This act was repealed for England and Wales by the Continuance, etc. of Laws Act 1623 (21 Jas. 1. c. 28).)
34 Edw. 3. c. 7	Attaint	An Attaint in Plea real.	The whole act.
34 Edw. 3. c. 9	Labourers	Labourers shall not be punished by Fine under the Statute 25 Edw. 3. Stat. 2. c. 5., but only by Imprisonment. Penalty on bailing them. Carpenters and Masons included. Wages of Carpenters and Masons. Their Conspiracies annulled.	The whole act.
34 Edw. 3. c. 10	Labourers	Punishment of fugitive Labourers; Process of Outlawry; Imprisonment; Burning in the Forehead. A Ward on Festivals.	The whole act.
34 Edw. 3. c. 11	Labourers	Mayors and Bailiffs shall deliver up fugitive Labourers.	The whole act.
34 Edw. 3. c. 16	Fines	Nonclaim of Fines shall be no Bar.	The whole act.
34 Edw. 3. c. 17	Trade, etc. with Ireland	Freedom of Trade in Ireland.	The whole act.
34 Edw. 3. c. 18	Trade, etc. with Ireland	English Land-owners in Ireland may import and export from and to England.	The whole act.
34 Edw. 3. c. 19	Customs	No Custom for Canvas to pack Wool in.	The whole act.
34 Edw. 3. c. 21	Exportation of wool, etc.	Confirmation of a Grant by the King and Council to Denizens to transport Wool beyond Sea.	The whole act.
36 Edw. 3. Stat. 1 c. 1	Confirmation of charters, etc.	Confirmation of the Great Charter, &c.	The whole act.
36 Edw. 3. Stat. 1 c. 2	Purveyance	Purveyance shall be made only for the King and Queen. Payment in ready Money. Name of Purveyors changed to Buyers. By whom and how Appraisement shall be made. Takings shall be made without Menaces; and where there is plenty. Buyers shall be Men of sufficient Estate; and their Commissions be renewed half-yearly. None bound to obey Buyers without ready Payment. Corn shall be measured by Strike. Present Payment shall be made for Carriage. Penalty on taking otherwise than according to Commission; Felony.	The whole act.
36 Edw. 3. Stat. 1 c. 3	Purveyance	Punishment of a Buyer taking a Bribe.	The whole act.
36 Edw. 3. Stat. 1 c. 4	Purveyance	Commissions to inquire of Buyers and Takers. The Steward, &c. of the Households shall ascertain the Receipts of Purveyors; and certify them into Chancery; and the Chancellor to the Commissioners. Extended to Purveyors for Great Horses.	The whole act.
36 Edw. 3. Stat. 1 c. 5	Purveyance	No Man of the Household shall keep at Livery more horses than allowed, 14 Edw. 3. Stat. 1. c. 19; nor retain Purveyors for himself.	The whole act.
36 Edw. 3. Stat. 1 c. 6	Purveyance	Purveyance of Victuals by a Subject, Felony.	The whole act.
36 Edw. 3. Stat. 1 c. 7	The staple	Mayors, &c. of the Staple shall take Cognizance of Contracts between Merchants; but not of Felonies. Saving as to Merchants Aliens; and as to Franchises.	The whole act.
36 Edw. 3. Stat. 1 c. 9	Breaches of statutes	Remedy in Chancery for Breaches of Statutes.	The whole act.
36 Edw. 3. Stat. 1 c. 10	Parliament	Parliament every Year.	The whole act.
36 Edw. 3. Stat. 1 c. 11	Customs, exportation	The Staple in England to be an Example. All Merchants may export Wools.	The whole act.
36 Edw. 3. Stat. 1 c. 14	Appropriation of certain fines, etc.	The Fines of Labourers, &c. shall be levied to the Use of the Commons. The Justices of the Peace shall take the Account.	The whole act.
36 Edw. 3. Stat. 1 c. 15	Pleading in English Act 1362	Reasons why the Laws should be pleaded in the English Tongue. Pleas shall be pleaded in the English Tongue, and be inrolled in Latin.	The whole act.
36 Edw. 3. Stat. 2	Of the Pardon made to the Commonalty of the Realm of England	Of the Pardon made to the Commonalty of the Realm of England. Statute the Second.	The whole act.
37 Edw. 3. Statut' de Victu et Vestitu (A Statute concerning Diet and Apparel) c. 1	A confirmation of former statutes.	A Statute concerning Diet and Apparel; Of the Thirty-seventh year. — Except Chapter Two. — A Writ of Indempnitate Nominis in Outlawry. The Party shall be admitted to find Surety thereupon.	The whole act.
37 Edw. 3. Statut' de Victu et Vestitu (A Statute concerning Diet and Apparel) c. 3	The several prices of a hen, capon, pullet, and goose.	A Statute concerning Diet and Apparel; Of the Thirty-seventh year. — Except Chapter Two. — A Writ of Indempnitate Nominis in Outlawry. The Party shall be admitted to find Surety thereupon.	The whole act.
37 Edw. 3. Statut' de Victu et Vestitu (A Statute concerning Diet and Apparel) c. 4	A clerk of the remembrance of the exchequer shall he assigned.	A Statute concerning Diet and Apparel; Of the Thirty-seventh year — Except Chapter Two. — A Writ of Indempnitate Nominis in Outlawry. The Party shall be admitted to find Surety thereupon.	The whole act.
37 Edw. 3. Statut' de Victu et Vestitu (A Statute concerning Diet and Apparel) c. 5	Merchants shall not ingross merchandises to inhance the price of them, nor use but one sort of merchandise.	A Statute concerning Diet and Apparel; Of the Thirty-seventh year. — Except Chapter Two. — A Writ of Indempnitate Nominis in Outlawry. The Party shall be admitted to find Surety thereupon.	The whole act.
37 Edw. 3. Statut' de Victu et Vestitu (A Statute concerning Diet and Apparel) c. 6	Handicraftsmen shall use but one mystery, but workmen may work as they did.	A Statute concerning Diet and Apparel; Of the Thirty-seventh year. — Except Chapter Two. — A Writ of Indempnitate Nominis in Outlawry. The Party shall be admitted to find Surety thereupon.	The whole act.
37 Edw. 3. Statut' de Victu et Vestitu (A Statute concerning Diet and Apparel) c. 7	Goldsmiths work shall be of good sterling, and marked with his own mark. None shall make white vessel and also gild.	A Statute concerning Diet and Apparel; Of the Thirty-seventh year. — Except Chapter Two. — A Writ of Indempnitate Nominis in Outlawry. The Party shall be admitted to find Surety thereupon.	The whole act.
37 Edw. 3. Statut' de Victu et Vestitu (A Statute concerning Diet and Apparel) c. 8	The diet and apparel of servants.	A Statute concerning Diet and Apparel; Of the Thirty-seventh year. — Except Chapter Two. — A Writ of Indempnitate Nominis in Outlawry. The Party shall be admitted to find Surety thereupon.	The whole act.
37 Edw. 3. Statut' de Victu et Vestitu (A Statute concerning Diet and Apparel) c. 9	The apparel of handicraftsmen and yeomen, and of their wives and children.	A Statute concerning Diet and Apparel; Of the Thirty-seventh year — Except Chapter Two. — A Writ of Indempnitate Nominis in Outlawry. The Party shall be admitted to find Surety thereupon.	The whole act.
37 Edw. 3. Statut' de Victu et Vestitu (A Statute concerning Diet and Apparel) c. 10	What apparel gentlemen under the estate of knights, and, and what esquires of two hundred mark-land, &c. may wear, and what their wives and children.	A Statute concerning Diet and Apparel; Of the Thirty-seventh year. — Except Chapter Two. — A Writ of Indempnitate Nominis in Outlawry. The Party shall be admitted to find Surety thereupon.	The whole act.
37 Edw. 3. Statut' de Victu et Vestitu (A Statute concerning Diet and Apparel) c. 11	The apparel of merchants, citizens, burgesses, and handicraftsmen.	A Statute concerning Diet and Apparel; Of the Thirty-seventh year. — Except Chapter Two. — A Writ of Indempnitate Nominis in Outlawry. The Party shall be admitted to find Surety thereupon.	The whole act.
37 Edw. 3. Statut' de Victu et Vestitu (A Statute concerning Diet and Apparel) c. 12	The apparel of knights which have lands whithin the yearly value of two hundred marks, and of knights and ladies which have four hundred mark land.	A Statute concerning Diet and Apparel; Of the Thirty-seventh year. — Except Chapter Two. — A Writ of Indempnitate Nominis in Outlawry. The Party shall be admitted to find Surety thereupon.	The whole act.
37 Edw. 3. Statut' de Victu et Vestitu (A Statute concerning Diet and Apparel) c. 13	The apparel of several sorts of clerks.	A Statute concerning Diet and Apparel; Of the Thirty-seventh year. — Except Chapter Two. — A Writ of Indempnitate Nominis in Outlawry. The Party shall be admitted to find Surety thereupon.	The whole act.
37 Edw. 3. Statut' de Victu et Vestitu (A Statute concerning Diet and Apparel) c. 14	The apparel of ploughmen, and other of mean estate; and the forfeitures of offenders against this ordinance.	A Statute concerning Diet and Apparel; Of the Thirty-seventh year — Except Chapter Two. — A Writ of Indempnitate Nominis in Outlawry. The Party shall be admitted to find Surety thereupon.	The whole act.
37 Edw. 3. Statut' de Victu et Vestitu (A Statute concerning Diet and Apparel) c. 15	Clothiers shall make cloths sufficient of the foresaid prices, so that this statute for default of such cloths be in no wise infringed.	A Statute concerning Diet and Apparel; Of the Thirty-seventh year. — Except Chapter Two. — A Writ of Indempnitate Nominis in Outlawry. The Party shall be admitted to find Surety thereupon.	The whole act.
37 Edw. 3. Statut' de Victu et Vestitu (A Statute concerning Diet and Apparel) c. 16	A repeal of the punishment of lands, and of life and member, inflicted by the stat. 27 Ed. 3. stat. 1 cap. 5. & 7. enquiry shall be made yearly in Gascoine in the King's dominions, of couchers of England, which lie there to buy wines.	A Statute concerning Diet and Apparel; Of the Thirty-seventh year. — Except Chapter Two. — A Writ of Indempnitate Nominis in Outlawry. The Party shall be admitted to find Surety thereupon.	The whole act.
37 Edw. 3. Statut' de Victu et Vestitu (A Statute concerning Diet and Apparel) c. 17	In what case a writ shall not be abated by exception of cognisance of villenage.	A Statute concerning Diet and Apparel; Of the Thirty-seventh year. — Except Chapter Two. — A Writ of Indempnitate Nominis in Outlawry. The Party shall be admitted to find Surety thereupon.	The whole act.
37 Edw. 3. Statut' de Victu et Vestitu (A Statute concerning Diet and Apparel) c. 18	The order of pursuing a suggestion made to the King.	A Statute concerning Diet and Apparel; Of the Thirty-seventh year. — Except Chapter Two. — A Writ of Indempnitate Nominis in Outlawry. The Party shall be admitted to find Surety thereupon.	The whole act.
37 Edw. 3. Statut' de Victu et Vestitu (A Statute concerning Diet and Apparel) c. 19	How each person shall use a hawk of another's that he taketh up.	A Statute concerning Diet and Apparel; Of the Thirty-seventh year. — Except Chapter Two. — A Writ of Indempnitate Nominis in Outlawry. The Party shall be admitted to find Surety thereupon.	The whole act.
38 Edw. 3. Stat. 1 c. 1	Former statutes shall be observed and executed.	De Ordinacoibus f'cis anno tricesimo octavo. Of the Ordinances made in the Thirty-eighth Year. Statute the First.	The whole act.
38 Edw. 3. Stat. 1 c. 2	Any merchant may use more merchandises than one, notwithstanding the statute of 37 Edw. 3. c. 5. Who only may transport gold or silver.	De Ordinacoibus f'cis anno tricesimo octavo. Of the Ordinances made in the Thirty-eighth Year. Statute the First.	The whole act.
38 Edw. 3. Stat. 1 c. 3	Fines shall be taken in the presence of the pledges.	De Ordinacoibus f'cis anno tricesimo octavo. Of the Ordinances made in the Thirty-eighth Year. Statute the First.	The whole act.
38 Edw. 3. Stat. 1 c. 4	Penal bonds, in the third person shall be void.	De Ordinacoibus f'cis anno tricesimo octavo. Of the Ordinances made in the Thirty-eighth Year. Statute the First.	The whole act.
38 Edw. 3. Stat. 1 c. 5	Any man may wage his law against a Londoner's papers.	De Ordinacoibus f'cis anno tricesimo octavo. Of the Ordinances made in the Thirty-eighth Year. Statute the First.	The whole act.
38 Edw. 3. Stat. 1 c. 6	A repeal of the felony imposed by stat. 27 Ed. 3. stat. 2. c. 3. for transporting of wool, &c. by Englishmen; but the forfeiture of lands and goods shall stand.	De Ordinacoibus f'cis anno tricesimo octavo. Of the Ordinances made in the Thirty-eighth Year. Statute the First.	The whole act.
38 Edw. 3. Stat. 1 c. 7	A confirmation of the statute of the staple, made by 27 Ed. 3. stat. 2.	De Ordinacoibus f'cis anno tricesimo octavo. Of the Ordinances made in the Thirty-eighth Year. Statute the First.	The whole act.
38 Edw. 3. Stat. 1 c. 8	A ship shall not be lost for a small thing therein not customed.	De Ordinacoibus f'cis anno tricesimo octavo. Of the Ordinances made in the Thirty-eighth Year. Statute the First.	The whole act.
38 Edw. 3. Stat. 1 c. 9	The punishment of him which proveth not his suggestion made to the King.	De Ordinacoibus f'cis anno tricesimo octavo. Of the Ordinances made in the Thirty-eighth Year. Statute the First.	The whole act.
38 Edw. 3. Stat. 1 c. 10	A confirmation of the statutes made for wines	De Ordinacoibus f'cis anno tricesimo octavo. Of the Ordinances made in the Thirty-eighth Year. Statute the First.	The whole act.
38 Edw. 3. Stat. 1 c. 11	Merchants denizens may fetch wines, and aliens may bring them.	De Ordinacoibus f'cis anno tricesimo octavo. Of the Ordinances made in the Thirty-eighth Year. Statute the First.	The whole act.
38 Edw. 3. Stat. 1 c. 12	The punishment of a juror taking reward to give verdict, and of embraceors.	De Ordinacoibus f'cis anno tricesimo octavo. Of the Ordinances made in the Thirty-eighth Year. Statute the First.	The whole act.
42 Edw. 3. c. 1	Confirmation of charters	Confirmation of the Charters.	The whole act.
42 Edw. 3. c. 2	Confirmation of pardon	Confirmation of the Pardon granted in 36 Edw. III.	The whole act.
42 Edw. 3. c. 5	Escheators	Escheator shall have xxl. of Land; and execute his Office.	The whole act.
42 Edw. 3. c. 6	Labourers	The Statute of Labourers enforced.	The whole act.
42 Edw. 3. c. 7	Londoners	Londoners priviledged to sell at retail Victuals only.	The whole act.
42 Edw. 3. c. 8	Importation of wine	English Merchants shall not use Hostages for foreign Wines; nor buy Wines until landed.	The whole act.
42 Edw. 3. c. 9	Crown debts, etc.	In levying the King's Debts, the Estreats shall be shewed to the Party indebted, and the Receipts totted. Sheriffs shall account by such Estreats. Sheriffs, &c. shall continue in Office one Year only.	The whole act.
43 Edw. 3. c. 1	The staple	Statute made in the Parliament holden at Westminster, on the Octave of the Holy Trinity.	The whole act.
43 Edw. 3. c. 2	Trade with Gascony	Statute made in the Parliament holden at Westminster, on the Octave of the Holy Trinity.	The whole act.
43 Edw. 3. c. 3	The King's butler, or his lieutenants, shall take no more wines than is commanded.	Statute made in the Parliament holden at Westminster, on the Octave of the Holy Trinity.	The whole act.
43 Edw. 3. c. 4	Pardon	Statute made in the Parliament holden at Westminster, on the Octave of the Holy Trinity.	The whole act.
45 Edw. 3. c. 1	Confirmation of charters	Statute made in the Forty-fifth Year of King Edward III. — Except Chapter Three. — Prohibitions to Spiritual Courts, in Plea for Tithe of Wood, of Twenty Years Growth.	The whole act.
45 Edw. 3. c. 2	Weirs	Statute made in the Forty-fifth Year of King Edward III. — Except Chapter Three. — Prohibitions to Spiritual Courts, in Plea for Tithe of Wood, of Twenty Years Growth.	The whole act.
45 Edw. 3. c. 4	Taxation	Statute made in the Forty-fifth Year of King Edward III. — Except Chapter Three. — Prohibitions to Spiritual Courts, in Plea for Tithe of Wood, of Twenty Years Growth.	The whole act.
47 Edw. 3. c. 1	Cloth	Statute of the Forty-seventh Year of King Edward, III.	The whole act.
47 Edw. 3. c. 1	Currency	Statute of the Forty-seventh Year of King Edward, III.	The whole act.
50 Edw. 3. c. 1	Confirmation of liberties and charters	Of the Pardons and Graces, granted by the King to the Commonalty of his Realm of England; In the Fiftieth Year of King Edward, III. — Except Chapter Four. — Prohibition shall not be allowed, after Consultation granted.	The whole act.
50 Edw. 3. c. 2	Confirmation of liberties and charters	Of the Pardons and Graces, granted by the King to the Commonalty of his Realm of England; In the Fiftieth Year of King Edward, III. — Except Chapter Four. — Prohibition shall not be allowed, after Consultation granted.	The whole act.
50 Edw. 3. c. 3	Pardon	Of the Pardons and Graces, granted by the King to the Commonalty of his Realm of England; In the Fiftieth Year of King Edward, III. — Except Chapter Four. — Prohibition shall not be allowed, after Consultation granted.	The whole act.
50 Edw. 3. c. 5	Confirmation of liberties and charters	Of the Pardons and Graces, granted by the King to the Commonalty of his Realm of England; In the Fiftieth Year of King Edward, III. — Except Chapter Four. — Prohibition shall not be allowed, after Consultation granted.	The whole act.
50 Edw. 3. c. 6	Confirmation of liberties and charters	Of the Pardons and Graces, granted by the King to the Commonalty of his Realm of England; In the Fiftieth Year of King Edward, III. — Except Chapter Four. — Prohibition shall not be allowed, after Consultation granted.	The whole act.
50 Edw. 3. c. 7	Confirmation of liberties and charters	Of the Pardons and Graces, granted by the King to the Commonalty of his Realm of England; In the Fiftieth Year of King Edward, III. — Except Chapter Four. — Prohibition shall not be allowed, after Consultation granted.	The whole act.
50 Edw. 3. c. 8	Confirmation of liberties and charters	Of the Pardons and Graces, granted by the King to the Commonalty of his Realm of England; In the Fiftieth Year of King Edward, III. — Except Chapter Four. — Prohibition shall not be allowed, after Consultation granted.	The whole act.
1 Ric. 2. c. 1	Confirmation of charters, etc.	Confirmation of Charters and Statutes.	The whole act.
1 Ric. 2. c. 2	Peace of the realm, etc.	Assises of Novel Disseisin to be kept, and Justice administered.	The whole act.
1 Ric. 2. c. 3	Purveyance	Action for Prelates against Purveyors.	The whole act.
1 Ric. 2. c. 5	Officers of the Exchequer	Statutes for Officers of the Exchequer confirmed. Debts once paid not to be demanded; Punishment of Clerk offending.	The whole act.
1 Ric. 2. c. 6	Villanies	Villaines and Land-tenants withdrawing their Services under the Pretext of Exemplifications from the Book of Domesday. Confederacies of Villaines; Commissions to Justices of the Peace to enquire thereof. Punishment of such Villaines; and their Abettors. Declaration as to the said Exemplifications.	The whole act.
1 Ric. 2. c. 7	Maintenance	Statutes against Maintenance confirmed. Punishment for giving Liveries for Maintenance. Justices of Assize shall enquire of Offences.	The whole act.
1 Ric. 2. c. 8	Protections	Protections with the Clause Volumus, in what Case not allowable.	The whole act.
1 Ric. 2. c. 9	Maintenance, etc.	Gifts of Lands, Goods, &c. in Fraud, or for Maintenance. Such Gifts declared void. Disseisees may recover against Disseisors after such Alienation, where they take the Profits.	The whole act.
1 Ric. 2. c. 10	Confirmation of pardons	Pardon in 51 Edw. III. confirmed.	The whole act.
1 Ric. 2. c. 13	Suits in spiritual courts	Malicious Indictors for suing in Spiritual Courts shall suffer as false Appellors under Stat. Westm. 2. 13 E. 1. c. 12.	The whole act.
1 Ric. 2. c. 14	Tithes	In Action for Goods taken away, or Claim of Tythes, General Averment shall not be received.	The whole act.
2 Ric. 2. Stat. 1. c. 1	Merchants	D'Statuto apud Glouc' nup' edito irrotulato anno s'c'do. Of the Statute late made at Gloucester, inrolled; In the Second Year; Statute the First. — Except Chapter Five. — The Penalty for telling slanderous Lyes of the Great Men of this Realm.	The whole act.
2 Ric. 2. Stat. 1. c. 2	Confirmation of statutes	D'Statuto apud Glouc' nup' edito irrotulato anno s'c'do. Of the Statute late made at Gloucester, inrolled; In the Second Year; Statute the First. — Except Chapter Five. — The Penalty for telling slanderous Lyes of the Great Men of this Realm.	The whole act.
2 Ric. 2. Stat. 1. c. 3	Merchants	D'Statuto apud Glouc' nup' edito irrotulato anno s'c'do. Of the Statute late made at Gloucester, inrolled; In the Second Year; Statute the First. — Except Chapter Five. — The Penalty for telling slanderous Lyes of the Great Men of this Realm.	The whole act.
2 Ric. 2. Stat. 1. c. 4	The penalty of mariners retained to serve the King on the sea, which do depart without licence.	D'Statuto apud Glouc' nup' edito irrotulato anno s'c'do. Of the Statute late made at Gloucester, inrolled; In the Second Year; Statute the First. — Except Chapter Five. — The Penalty for telling slanderous Lyes of the Great Men of this Realm.	The whole act.
2 Ric. 2. Stat. 1. c. 6	Commissions shall be awarded to arrest rioters, and other persons offensive to the peace, and to imprison them.	D'Statuto apud Glouc' nup' edito irrotulato anno s'c'do. Of the Statute late made at Gloucester, inrolled; In the Second Year; Statute the First. — Except Chapter Five. — The Penalty for telling slanderous Lyes of the Great Men of this Realm.	The whole act.
2 Ric. 2. Stat. 1. c. 7	Pope Urban VI Act 1378	D'Statuto apud Glouc' nup' edito irrotulato anno s'c'do. Of the Statute late made at Gloucester, inrolled; In the Second Year; Statute the First. — Except Chapter Five. — The Penalty for telling slanderous Lyes of the Great Men of this Realm.	The whole act.
2 Ric. 2. Stat. 1. c. 8	Confirmation of statutes	D'Statuto apud Glouc' nup' edito irrotulato anno s'c'do. Of the Statute late made at Gloucester, inrolled; In the Second Year; Statute the First. — Except Chapter Five. — The Penalty for telling slanderous Lyes of the Great Men of this Realm.	The whole act.
2 Ric. 2 Stat. 2 c. 1	Confirmation of liberties	D'Statuto apud Westm̄ edito Anno s'c'do irrotulato. Of the Statute made at Westminster, in the Second Year; inrolled. Statute the Second.	The whole act.
2 Ric. 2 Stat. 2 c. 2	Riots	D'Statuto apud Westm̄ edito Anno s'c'do irrotulato. Of the Statute made at Westminster, in the Second Year; inrolled. Statute the Second.	The whole act.
2 Ric. 2 Stat. 2 c. 3	Fraudulent deeds	D'Statuto apud Westm̄ edito Anno s'c'do irrotulato. Of the Statute made at Westminster, in the Second Year; inrolled. Statute the Second.	The whole act.
3 Ric. 2. c. 1	Confirmation of liberties, etc.	Liberties of the Church and Laws of the Realm confirmed.	The whole act.
3 Ric. 2. c. 2	Assize of Cloths Act 1379	Statutes as to the Assise of Cloths confirmed. Penalty on Aulneger setting his seal to faulty Cloths.	The whole act.
4 Ric. 2. c. 2	Pardon	The King's Pardon of Escapes of Felons.	The whole act.
5 Ric. 2 Stat. 1. c. 1	Confirmation of liberties, charters and statutes	Statutu Ordinaco'es edit' apud Westm̄ Anno quinto. Statute and Ordinances made at Westminster; In the Fifth Year. Statute the First. — Except Chapter Seven. — Forcible Entries forbidden.	The whole act.
5 Ric. 2 Stat. 1. c. 2	Exportation of gold, silver, leaving the realm	Statutu Ordinaco'es edit' apud Westm̄ Anno quinto. Statute and Ordinances made at Westminster; in the Fifth Year. Statute the First. — Except Chapter Seven. — Forcible Entries forbidden.	The whole act.
5 Ric. 2 Stat. 1. c. 3	None of the King's subjects shall carry forth nor bring any merchandises, but only in ships of the King's allegiance.	Statutu Ordinaco'es edit' apud Westm̄ Anno quinto. Statute and Ordinances made at Westminster; in the Fifth Year. Statute the First. — Except Chapter Seven. — Forcible Entries forbidden.	The whole act.
5 Ric. 2 Stat. 1. c. 4	The several prices of several sorts of wines to be sold in gross or by retail, and the forfeiture of those which do sell them dearer.	Statutu Ordinaco'es edit' apud Westm̄ Anno quinto. Statute and Ordinances made at Westminster; in the Fifth Year. Statute the First. — Except Chapter Seven. — Forcible Entries forbidden.	The whole act.
5 Ric. 2 Stat. 1. c. 5	The King's pardon to those that repressed or took revenge of his rebels.	Statutu Ordinaco'es edit' apud Westm̄ Anno quinto. Statute and Ordinances made at Westminster; in the Fifth Year. Statute the First. — Except Chapter Seven. — Forcible Entries forbidden.	The whole act.
5 Ric. 2 Stat. 1. c. 6	Treason Act 1381	Statutu Ordinaco'es edit' apud Westm̄ Anno quinto. Statute and Ordinances made at Westminster; in the Fifth Year. Statute the First. — Except Chapter Seven. — Forcible Entries forbidden.	The whole act.
5 Ric. 2 Stat. 1. c. 8	A remedy for them whose writings were destroyed in the late insurrection.	Statutu Ordinaco'es edit' apud Westm̄ Anno quinto. Statute and Ordinances made at Westminster; in the Fifth Year. Statute the First. — Except Chapter Seven. — Forcible Entries forbidden.	The whole act.
5 Ric. 2 Stat. 1. c. 9	Every person that is impeached in the exchequer may plead in his own discharge.	Statutu Ordinaco'es edit' apud Westm̄ Anno quinto. Statute and Ordinances made at Westminster; in the Fifth Year. Statute the First. — Except Chapter Seven. — Forcible Entries forbidden.	The whole act.
5 Ric. 2 Stat. 1. c. 10	The covenants of those that shall serve the King in his wars or embassies shall be put in writing, and sent into the exchequer.	Statutu Ordinaco'es edit' apud Westm̄ Anno quinto. Statute and Ordinances made at Westminster; in the Fifth Year. Statute the First. — Except Chapter Seven. — Forcible Entries forbidden.	The whole act.
5 Ric. 2 Stat. 1. c. 11	The accompts in the exchequer shall be more speedily heard than they were wont.	Statutu Ordinaco'es edit' apud Westm̄ Anno quinto. Statute and Ordinances made at Westminster; in the Fifth Year. Statute the First. — Except Chapter Seven. — Forcible Entries forbidden.	The whole act.
5 Ric. 2 Stat. 1. c. 12	Two clerks shall be assigned to make parcels of accompts in the exchequer.	Statutu Ordinaco'es edit' apud Westm̄ Anno quinto. Statute and Ordinances made at Westminster; in the Fifth Year. Statute the First. — Except Chapter Seven. — Forcible Entries forbidden.	The whole act.
5 Ric. 2 Stat. 1. c. 13	Accompts of Nichil shall be put out of the exchequer. An accomptant discharged upon his oath.	Statutu Ordinaco'es edit' apud Westm̄ Anno quinto. Statute and Ordinances made at Westminster; in the Fifth Year. Statute the First. — Except Chapter Seven. — Forcible Entries forbidden.	The whole act.
5 Ric. 2 Stat. 1. c. 14	The clerk of the pipe, &c., sworn for the entry of writs of the great and privy seal.	Statutu Ordinaco'es edit' apud Westm̄ Anno quinto. Statute and Ordinances made at Westminster; in the Fifth Year. Statute the First. — Except Chapter Seven. — Forcible Entries forbidden.	The whole act.
5 Ric. 2 Stat. 1. c. 15	Upon a judgement of livery, the remembrancer shall cause the suit to cease.	Statutu Ordinaco'es edit' apud Westm̄ Anno quinto. Statute and Ordinances made at Westminster; in the Fifth Year. Statute the First. — Except Chapter Seven. — Forcible Entries forbidden.	The whole act.
5 Ric. 2 Stat. 1. c. 16	The fees of the exchequer clerks for making commissions, or records of Nisi prius.	Statutu Ordinaco'es edit' apud Westm̄ Anno quinto. Statute and Ordinances made at Westminster; in the Fifth Year. Statute the First. — Except Chapter Seven. — Forcible Entries forbidden.	The whole act.
5 Ric. 2 Stat. 2. c. 1	Merchant strangers	Ordinanco'es et Concordie f'ce in p'liamento tento apud Westm̄ in Castino s'ci Joh'is an porta latina Ao quinto.. Ordinances and Agreements made in the Parliament holden at Westminster, in the Morrow of Saint John Port-Latin; In the Fifth Year. Statute the Second. — Except Chapter Four. — Every one shall obey his summons to Parliament. Penalty on Sheriffs omitting Returns of Writs to Parliament.	The whole act.
5 Ric. 2 Stat. 2. c. 2	Leather	Ordinanco'es et Concordie f'ce in p'liamento tento apud Westm̄ in Castino s'ci Joh'is an porta latina Ao quinto.. Ordinances and Agreements made in the Parliament holden at Westminster, in the Morrow of Saint John Port-Latin; In the Fifth Year. Statute the Second. — Except Chapter Four. — Every one shall obey his summons to Parliament. Penalty on Sheriffs omitting Returns of Writs to Parliament.	The whole act.
5 Ric. 2 Stat. 2. c. 3	Subsidy	Ordinanco'es et Concordie f'ce in p'liamento tento apud Westm̄ in Castino s'ci Joh'is an porta latina Ao quinto.. Ordinances and Agreements made in the Parliament holden at Westminster, in the Morrow of Saint John Port-Latin; In the Fifth Year. Statute the Second. — Except Chapter Four. — Every one shall obey his summons to Parliament. Penalty on Sheriffs omitting Returns of Writs to Parliament.	The whole act.
5 Ric. 2 Stat. 2. c. 5	Heresy Act 1382	Ordinanco'es et Concordie f'ce in p'liamento tento apud Westm̄ in Castino s'ci Joh'is an porta latina Ao quinto.. Ordinances and Agreements made in the Parliament holden at Westminster, in the Morrow of Saint John Port-Latin; In the Fifth Year. Statute the Second. — Except Chapter Four. — Every one shall obey his summons to Parliament. Penalty on Sheriffs omitting Returns of Writs to Parliament.	The whole act.
6 Ric. 2. Stat. 1. c. 1	Confirmation of liberties, charters and statutes	Statutu editum apud Westm̄ Anno sexto. Statute made at Westminster in the Sixth Year. Statute the First. — Except Chapter Two. — Actions of Debt and Account shall be brought in their proper Counties.	The whole act.
6 Ric. 2. Stat. 1. c. 3	Legal proceedings	Statutu editum apud Westm̄ Anno sexto. Statute made at Westminster in the Sixth Year. Statute the First. — Except Chapter Two. — Actions of Debt and Account shall be brought in their proper Counties.	The whole act.
6 Ric. 2. Stat. 1. c. 4	Deeds enrolled that were destroyed in the late insurrection, exemplified, shall be of force.	Statutu editum apud Westm̄ Anno sexto. Statute made at Westminster in the Sixth Year. Statute the First. — Except Chapter Two. — Actions of Debt and Account shall be brought in their proper Counties.	The whole act.
6 Ric. 2. Stat. 1. c. 5	Justices of assise, &c. shall hold their sessions in principal towns.	Statutu editum apud Westm̄ Anno sexto. Statute made at Westminster in the Sixth Year. Statute the First. — Except Chapter Two. — Actions of Debt and Account shall be brought in their proper Counties.	The whole act.
6 Ric. 2. Stat. 1. c. 6	Rape	Statutu editum apud Westm̄ Anno sexto. Statute made at Westminster in the Sixth Year. Statute the First. — Except Chapter Two. — Actions of Debt and Account shall be brought in their proper Counties.	The whole act.
6 Ric. 2. Stat. 1. c. 7	At what prices sweet wines may be sold.	Statutu editum apud Westm̄ Anno sexto. Statute made at Westminster in the Sixth Year. Statute the First. — Except Chapter Two. — Actions of Debt and Account shall be brought in their proper Counties.	The whole act.
6 Ric. 2. Stat. 1. c. 8	Where no English ships are to be had, others may be used.	Statutu editum apud Westm̄ Anno sexto. Statute made at Westminster in the Sixth Year. Statute the First. — Except Chapter Two. — Actions of Debt and Account shall be brought in their proper Counties.	The whole act.
6 Ric. 2. Stat. 1. c. 9	Victuallers	Statutu editum apud Westm̄ Anno sexto. Statute made at Westminster in the Sixth Year. Statute the First. — Except Chapter Two. — Actions of Debt and Account shall be brought in their proper Counties.	The whole act.
6 Ric. 2. Stat. 1. c. 10	Aliens being in amity with the King, may bring in victuals, and sell them.	Statutu editum apud Westm̄ Anno sexto. Statute made at Westminster in the Sixth Year. Statute the First. — Except Chapter Two. — Actions of Debt and Account shall be brought in their proper Counties.	The whole act.
6 Ric. 2. Stat. 1. c. 11	Hosts in cities, towns, &c. shall not forestall fish or other victuals. Fishmongers in London may not buy fresh fish to sell again, except eels, &c.	Statutu editum apud Westm̄ Anno sexto. Statute made at Westminster in the Sixth Year. Statute the First. — Except Chapter Two. — Actions of Debt and Account shall be brought in their proper Counties.	The whole act.
6 Ric. 2. Stat. 1. c. 12	All chief officers of towns corporate shall be sworn to observe the aforesaid ordinance touching fishmongers.	Statutu editum apud Westm̄ Anno sexto. Statute made at Westminster in the Sixth Year. Statute the First. — Except Chapter Two. — Actions of Debt and Account shall be brought in their proper Counties.	The whole act.
6 Ric. 2. Stat. 1. c. 13	The King's pardon to his subjects after the late insurrection, with exceptions.	Statutu editum apud Westm̄ Anno sexto. Statute made at Westminster in the Sixth Year. Statute the First. — Except Chapter Two. — Actions of Debt and Account shall be brought in their proper Counties.	The whole act.
6 Ric. 2 Stat. 2. c. 1	Pardon	D'Statuto apud Westm̄ ao sexto edito. Of the Statute made at Westminster in the Sixth Year. Statute the Second.	The whole act.
6 Ric. 2 Stat. 2. c. 2	Purveyance	D'Statuto apud Westm̄ ao sexto edito. Of the Statute made at Westminster in the Sixth Year. Statute the Second.	The whole act.
6 Ric. 2 Stat. 2. c. 3	Trespass	D'Statuto apud Westm̄ ao sexto edito. Of the Statute made at Westminster in the Sixth Year. Statute the Second.	The whole act.
6 Ric. 2 Stat. 2. c. 4	Trespass	D'Statuto apud Westm̄ ao sexto edito. Of the Statute made at Westminster in the Sixth Year. Statute the Second.	The whole act.
6 Ric. 2 Stat. 2. c. 5	The number of compurgators to prove the compulsion.	D'Statuto apud Westm̄ ao sexto edito. Of the Statute made at Westminster in the Sixth Year. Statute the Second.	The whole act.
7 Ric. 2. c. 1	Confirmation of liberties	Liberties of the Church confirmed.	The whole act.
7 Ric. 2. c. 2	Confirmation of statutes	The Charters and Statutes confirmed.	The whole act.
7 Ric. 2. c. 5	Vagabonds Act 1383	Justices shall examine Vagabonds.	The whole act.
7 Ric. 2. c. 6	Confirmation of Statute of Winchester	The Statute of Winchester confirmed. Every Sheriff shall proclaim it quarterly.	The whole act.
7 Ric. 2. c. 8	Purveyance	The Statutes of Purveyors confirmed and extended to Servants of Subjects.	The whole act.
7 Ric. 2. c. 9	Cloths	Statute made against deceit in Cloths sold, and against Aulnegers and Collectors of the Subsidy of Cloths, confirmed; Application of the Forfeitures.	The whole act.
7 Ric. 2. c. 10	Real actions	Trial of Assises, &c. in Counties where the King is.	The whole act.
7 Ric. 2. c. 11	Repeal of certain statutes	The Statutes 5 Ric. II. c. 4, 5, and 6 Ric. II. c. 7, 11, 12, concerning Fishmongers, Victuallers, and Vintners, repealed. Victuallers of London shall be under the Rule of the Mayor and Aldermen.	The whole act.
7 Ric. 2. c. 16	Exportation to Scotland	No Armour or Victual shall be sent into Scotland without Licence of the King; on Pain of Forfeiture thereof.	The whole act.
7 Ric. 2. c. 17	Mainpernors	When Mainpernors shall be liable in Damages by Delay.	The whole act.
8 Ric. 2. c. 1	Confirmation of liberties, etc.	Liberties of the Church, and Statutes confirmed.	The whole act.
8 Ric. 2. c. 2	Justices of assize, etc.	No Lawyer shall be a Judge in his own Country.	The whole act.
9 Ric. 2. c. 1	Confirmation of statutes	D'Statuto edito apud Westm̄ ao nono. Of the Statute made at Westminster in the Ninth Year.	The whole act.
9 Ric. 2. c. 2	Legal proceedings	D'Statuto edito apud Westm̄ ao nono. Of the Statute made at Westminster in the Ninth Year.	The whole act.
9 Ric. 2. c. 3	Legal proceedings	D'Statuto edito apud Westm̄ ao nono. Of the Statute made at Westminster in the Ninth Year.	The whole act.
9 Ric. 2. c. 4	Legal proceedings	D'Statuto edito apud Westm̄ ao nono. Of the Statute made at Westminster in the Ninth Year.	The whole act.
9 Ric. 2. c. 5	Marshalsea	D'Statuto edito apud Westm̄ ao nono. Of the Statute made at Westminster in the Ninth Year.	The whole act.
10 Ric. 2. c. 1	Commission of inquiry into courts, etc.	D'Statuto edito apud Westm̄ ao xo. Of the Statute made at Westminster in the Tenth Year.	The whole act.
11 Ric. 2. c. 1	The archbishop of York and others attainted of high treason.	D'Statuto edit' apud Westm̄ ao xjo. Of the Statute made at Westminster In the Eleventh Year. — Except Chapter Ten. — Delays of Law by Privy Seal forbidden.	The whole act.
11 Ric. 2. c. 2	Clause to prevent fraudulent conveyances of their estates.	D'Statuto edit' apud Westm̄ ao xjo. Of the Statute made at Westminster In the Eleventh Year. — Except Chapter Ten. — Delays of Law by Privy Seal forbidden.	The whole act.
11 Ric. 2. c. 3	The estates of the bishop of Chichester and others also forfeited.	D'Statuto edit' apud Westm̄ ao xjo. Of the Statute made at Westminster In the Eleventh Year. — Except Chapter Ten. — Delays of Law by Privy Seal forbidden.	The whole act.
11 Ric. 2. c. 4	The penalty of concealing any part of the said estates after proclamation made. Estates possessed by a traitor in another's right excepted.	D'Statuto edit' apud Westm̄ ao xjo. Of the Statute made at Westminster In the Eleventh Year. — Except Chapter Ten. — Delays of Law by Privy Seal forbidden.	The whole act.
11 Ric. 2. c. 5	Issues in tail, and jointures of women, also excepted.	D'Statuto edit' apud Westm̄ ao xjo. Of the Statute made at Westminster In the Eleventh Year. — Except Chapter Ten. — Delays of Law by Privy Seal forbidden.	The whole act.
11 Ric. 2. c. 6	Penalty of petitioning the King for any grant of the said estates during the war.	D'Statuto edit' apud Westm̄ ao xjo. Of the Statute made at Westminster In the Eleventh Year. — Except Chapter Ten. — Delays of Law by Privy Seal forbidden.	The whole act.
11 Ric. 2. c. 7	All merchants aliens and denizens may buy and sell within this realm without interruption.	D'Statuto edit' apud Westm̄ ao xjo. Of the Statute made at Westminster In the Eleventh Year. — Except Chapter Ten. — Delays of Law by Privy Seal forbidden.	The whole act.
11 Ric. 2. c. 8	Certain annuities granted by the King, his father and grandfather, made void.	D'Statuto edit' apud Westm̄ ao xjo. Of the Statute made at Westminster In the Eleventh Year. — Except Chapter Ten. — Delays of Law by Privy Seal forbidden.	The whole act.
11 Ric. 2. c. 9	No new imposition shall be put upon merchandises.	D'Statuto edit' apud Westm̄ ao xjo. Of the Statute made at Westminster In the Eleventh Year. — Except Chapter Ten. — Delays of Law by Privy Seal forbidden.	The whole act.
11 Ric. 2. c. 11	The keeping of assises in good towns, referred to the consideration of the chancellor and justices, &c.	D'Statuto edit' apud Westm̄ ao xjo. Of the Statute made at Westminster In the Eleventh Year. — Except Chapter Ten. — Delays of Law by Privy Seal forbidden.	The whole act.
12 Ric. 2. c. 1	Confirmation of liberties, etc.	Liberties of the Church, the Charters and Statutes confirmed.	The whole act.
12 Ric. 2. c. 3	No servant shall depart from one hunted to another, without a testimonial under the King's seal, on pain of being set in the stocks.	No Servant shall depart from one Hundred to another.	The whole act.
12 Ric. 2. c. 4	The several penalties for giving or taking more wages than is limited statute.	The several Penalties for giving or taking more Wages than is limited by Statute.	The whole act.
12 Ric. 2. c. 5	Whosoever serveth in husbandry until twelve years old, shall so continue.	Whosoever serveth in Husbandry until Twelve Years old shall so continue.	The whole act.
12 Ric. 2. c. 6	No servants in husbandry, or labourer, shall wear any sword, buckler, or dagger. Unlawful games prohibited.	No Servants in Husbandry shall wear any sword, &c.	The whole act.
12 Ric. 2. c. 7	The punishment of beggars able to serve, and a provision for impotent beggars.	The Punishment of Beggars able to serve.	The whole act.
12 Ric. 2. c. 8	Travellers reporting they have been imprisoned beyond sea shall produce testimonials.	Travellers reporting they have been imprisoned beyond the seas, shall produce Testimonials.	The whole act.
12 Ric. 2. c. 9	The statute of labourers shall be executed within cities and boroughs.	The Statute of Labourers shall be executed within Cities and Boroughs.	The whole act.
12 Ric. 2. c. 14	Cloths	Statute 27 Edw. III. chapter 1. for Cloths confirmed.	The whole act.
13 Ric. 2. Stat. 1. c. 3	Court of Marshalsea Act 1389	Limits of Steward and Marshal's Jurisdiction.	The whole act.
13 Ric. 2. Stat. 1. c. 4	Clerk of market of King's house	Duty of the Clerk of the Market of the King's House; as to Weights, &c. Penalty for Misconduct.	The whole act.
13 Ric. 2. Stat. 1. c. 6	Sergeants at Arms Act 1389	Number of Serjeants at Arms, thirty. Penalty on them for Extortion, Fine and Ransom.	The whole act.
13 Ric. 2. Stat. 1. c. 9	Weights and Measures Act 1389	One Measure and one Weight throughout the Realm, except in Lancashire. Wool shall be sold 14 lb. the Stone. Refuse of Wools. Wool shall not be bought by Good Packing; and shall be cocketed only in the Owner's Name.	The whole act.
13 Ric. 2. Stat. 1. c. 10	Cloths	Cogware and Kendal Cloth may be made of their usual Length and Breadth.	The whole act.
13 Ric. 2. Stat. 1. c. 11	Cloths	Inconveniences from exporting deceitful cloth. Cloth of certain countries shall not be put to sale packed or folded . The makers shall put their marks to cloths.	The whole act. (Note: This act was not included in the Statute Law Revision Act 1863 (26 & 27 Vict. c. 125). This act was repealed for England and Wales by the Woollen Manufacture Act 1809 (49 Geo. 3. c. 109).)
13 Ric. 2. Stat. 1. c. 12	Tanners	No Shoemaker shall be a Tanner; nor any Tanner a Shoemaker.	The whole act.
13 Ric. 2. Stat. 1. c. 13	Keeping of dogs to hunt, etc.	None shall hunt but they wch have a sufficient Living.	The whole act. (Note: This act was not included in the Statute Law Revision Act 1863 (26 & 27 Vict. c. 125). This act was repealed for England and Wales by the Game Act 1831 (1 & 2 Will. 4. c. 32).)
13 Ric. 2. Stat. 1. c. 14	Bonds to the Crown	Bonds to the King in the Exchequer shall not be of the Double.	The whole act.
13 Ric. 2. Stat. 1. c. 15	Uniting of castles and gaols to counties	Castles and Gaols united to their Counties.	The whole act.
13 Ric. 2. Stat. 1. c. 16	Protections	Protection Quia Profecturus, when allowable; Protection Quia moraturus as before. Repeal of all such Protections when the Parties are in England.	The whole act.
13 Ric. 2. Stat. 1. c. 17	Real actions	In Suits against particular Tenants, the Reversioner may be received to defend his Right. Extended to Suits now depending. Reversioner shall find Surety of the Issues of the Lands in Demand.	The whole act.
13 Ric. 2. Stat. 1. c. 18	Attaints	Proceedings against the Mayor and Bailiffs of Lincoln upon the Petition of the Bishop, &c. thereof. Recognizances of Mercial Trials in Suits in Lincoln by the Mayor of the City. On false Verdict before the Mayor as to Mercial Trials, Attaint shall be brought and tried by a Jury of the County at large.	The whole act.
13 Ric. 2. Stat. 1. c. 20	Going beyond sea	At what Ports persons going beyond Sea shall embark.	The whole act.
13 Ric. 2. Stat. 3. c. 1	Maintenance	Statute the Third.	The whole act.
14 Ric. 2. c. 1	The staple	D'Statuto apud Westm̄ Anno quarto decimo. Of the Statute made at Westminster; in the Fourteenth Year. — Except Chapter Eleven. — Eight Justices of Peace in each County. Their Estreats. Their Wages. Seal for Servants. The Statutes 12 Ric. 2., 13 Ric. 2. st. 1. c. 7,. and other Statute confirmed.	The whole act.
14 Ric. 2. c. 2	Trading	D'Statuto apud Westm̄ Anno quarto decimo. Of the Statute made at Westminster; in the Fourteenth Year. — Except Chapter Eleven. — Eight Justices of Peace in each County. Their Estreats. Their Wages. Seal for Servants. The Statutes 12 Ric. 2., 13 Ric. 2. st. 1. c. 7,. and other Statute confirmed.	The whole act.
14 Ric. 2. c. 3	The staple	D'Statuto apud Westm̄ Anno quarto decimo. Of the Statute made at Westminster; in the Fourteenth Year. — Except Chapter Eleven. — Eight Justices of Peace in each County. Their Estreats. Their Wages. Seal for Servants. The Statutes 12 Ric. 2., 13 Ric. 2. st. 1. c. 7,. and other Statute confirmed.	The whole act.
14 Ric. 2. c. 4	Trading	D'Statuto apud Westm̄ Anno quarto decimo. Of the Statute made at Westminster; in the Fourteenth Year. — Except Chapter Eleven. — Eight Justices of Peace in each County. Their Estreats. Their Wages. Seal for Servants. The Statutes 12 Ric. 2., 13 Ric. 2. st. 1. c. 7,. and other Statute confirmed.	The whole act.
14 Ric. 2. c. 5	Trading	D'Statuto apud Westm̄ Anno quarto decimo. Of the Statute made at Westminster; in the Fourteenth Year. — Except Chapter Eleven. — Eight Justices of Peace in each County. Their Estreats. Their Wages. Seal for Servants. The Statutes 12 Ric. 2., 13 Ric. 2. st. 1. c. 7,. and other Statute confirmed.	The whole act.
14 Ric. 2. c. 6	Trading	D'Statuto apud Westm̄ Anno quarto decimo. Of the Statute made at Westminster; in the Fourteenth Year. — Except Chapter Eleven. — Eight Justices of Peace in each County. Their Estreats. Their Wages. Seal for Servants. The Statutes 12 Ric. 2., 13 Ric. 2. st. 1. c. 7,. and other Statute confirmed.	The whole act.
14 Ric. 2. c. 7	Customs	D'Statuto apud Westm̄ Anno quarto decimo. Of the Statute made at Westminster; in the Fourteenth Year. — Except Chapter Eleven. — Eight Justices of Peace in each County. Their Estreats. Their Wages. Seal for Servants. The Statutes 12 Ric. 2., 13 Ric. 2. st. 1. c. 7,. and other Statute confirmed.	The whole act.
14 Ric. 2. c. 8	Customs	D'Statuto apud Westm̄ Anno quarto decimo. Of the Statute made at Westminster; in the Fourteenth Year. — Except Chapter Eleven. — Eight Justices of Peace in each County. Their Estreats. Their Wages. Seal for Servants. The Statutes 12 Ric. 2., 13 Ric. 2. st. 1. c. 7,. and other Statute confirmed.	The whole act.
14 Ric. 2. c. 9	Trading	D'Statuto apud Westm̄ Anno quarto decimo. Of the Statute made at Westminster; in the Fourteenth Year. — Except Chapter Eleven. — Eight Justices of Peace in each County. Their Estreats. Their Wages. Seal for Servants. The Statutes 12 Ric. 2., 13 Ric. 2. st. 1. c. 7,. and other Statute confirmed.	The whole act.
14 Ric. 2. c. 10	Customs	D'Statuto apud Westm̄ Anno quarto decimo. Of the Statute made at Westminster; in the Fourteenth Year. — Except Chapter Eleven. — Eight Justices of Peace in each County. Their Estreats. Their Wages. Seal for Servants. The Statutes 12 Ric. 2., 13 Ric. 2. st. 1. c. 7,. and other Statute confirmed.	The whole act.
14 Ric. 2. c. 12	Money	D'Statuto apud Westm̄ Anno quarto decimo. Of the Statute made at Westminster; in the Fourteenth Year. — Except Chapter Eleven. — Eight Justices of Peace in each County. Their Estreats. Their Wages. Seal for Servants. The Statutes 12 Ric. 2., 13 Ric. 2. st. 1. c. 7,. and other Statute confirmed.	The whole act.
15 Ric. 2. c. 1	Confirmation of statutes	Former Statutes confirmed.	The whole act.
15 Ric. 2. c. 4	Measures	Eight Bushels of Corn striked make the Quarter. Penalty on buying after any other Rate, Forfeiture of the Corn.	The whole act.
15 Ric. 2. c. 7	Exportation	Stat. 7 Ric. 2. c. 16. recited; Armour, Corn, or Victuals allowed to be carried to Berwick. Customs on Export thereof, &c.	The whole act.
15 Ric. 2. c. 8	Exportation	St. 14 Ric. 2. c. 7., as to the Export of Tin, repealed.	The whole act.
15 Ric. 2. c. 9	The staple	Statute of the Staple 27 Edw. III. st. 2. cap. 9. recited and confirmed. Penalty on Mayors for contravening thereof.	The whole act.
15 Ric. 2. c. 10	Cloths	None shall buy Cloths of Guildford until they are fulled, &c.	The whole act.
15 Ric. 2. c. 11	Girdlers	Girdlers freed from restraint of certain Patents.	The whole act.
15 Ric. 2. c. 12	Private courts	None shall be compelled to answer in private Courts for Things determinable by the Law of the Land.	The whole act.
16 Ric. 2. c. 1	Trade Act 1392	Recital of 9 Edw. 3. st. 1. chap. 1, that Merchants may freely buy and sell; and of Stat. 25 Edw. 3. st. 3. chap. 2, confirming 9 Edw. 3., and enacting that Merchants may sell their Wares in Gross or by Retail. Statute 11 Ric. 2. c. 7., confirming former Statutes. No Merchant Stranger shall retail any Merchandises but Victuals. No Spicery shall be exported.	The whole act.
16 Ric. 2. c. 2	Confirmation, etc. of 15 Ric. 2 c. 12	The Statute 15 Ric. 2. chapter 12, confirmed. Penalty on Offenders 20l.	The whole act.
16 Ric. 2. c. 3	Weights and Measures Act 1392	Weights and Measures shall be according to the Standard in the Exchequer; and be preserved, &c. by the Clerk of the Market.	The whole act.
16 Ric. 2. c. 4	Liveries	Who may only wear another's Livery.	The whole act. (Note: This act was not included in the Statute Law Revision Act 1863 (26 & 27 Vict. c. 125). This act was repealed for England and Wales by the Continuance of Laws, etc. Act 1627 (3 Cha. 1. c. 5).)
17 Ric. 2. c. 1	Money	9 Edw. 3. stat. 2. ch. 3. against melting Money recited; extended to Groats and Half-groats. No foreign Coin shall be current in England; nor Exchange made of English Money for Scottish.	The whole act.
17 Ric. 2. c. 2	Cloths	Cloths may be made of any length and breadth. No cloth shall be sold until measured, &c. by the Aulneger. Deceit in making cloth forbidden.	The whole act.
17 Ric. 2. c. 7	Exportation of corn	All the King's Subjects may carry Corn out of the Realm when they will.	The whole act.
17 Ric. 2. c. 12	Erroneous judgments in London	The Statute 28 Edw. 3. c. 10. shall not extend to erroneous Judgments in London.	The whole act.
20 Ric. 2. c. 1	Riding armed	Statutu de Anno vicesimo. Statute of the Twentieth Year.	The whole act.
20 Ric. 2. c. 2	Liveries	Statutu de Anno vicesimo. Statute of the Twentieth Year.	The whole act.
20 Ric. 2. c. 3	Justices of assize	Statutu de Anno vicesimo. Statute of the Twentieth Year.	The whole act.
20 Ric. 2. c. 4	A confirmation of part of the stat. of 28 Ed. III. c 13. touching merchant strangers.	Statutu de Anno vicesimo. Statute of the Twentieth Year.	The whole act.
20 Ric. 2. c. 5	The penalty of him who taketh another's horse or beast for the King's service without sufficient warrant.	Statutu de Anno vicesimo. Statute of the Twentieth Year.	The whole act.
20 Ric. 2. c. 6	Licence granted to Belknap, Holte, and Bourghe, to return into England, notwithstanding the statute of 11 Rich. II. c. 1.	Statutu de Anno vicesimo. Statute of the Twentieth Year.	The whole act.
21 Ric. 2. c. 1	Confirmation of liberties and franchises	Statutu de Anno vicesimo primo. Statute of the Twenty-first Year.	The whole act.
21 Ric. 2. c. 2	Repeal of 10 Ric. 2	Statutu de Anno vicesimo primo. Statute of the Twenty-first Year.	The whole act.
21 Ric. 2. c. 3	Treasons	Statutu de Anno vicesimo primo. Statute of the Twenty-first Year.	The whole act.
21 Ric. 2. c. 4	Treasons	Statutu de Anno vicesimo primo. Statute of the Twenty-first Year.	The whole act.
21 Ric. 2. c. 5	The oaths and fealty of great men shall be inrolled in parliament.	Statutu de Anno vicesimo primo. Statute of the Twenty-first Year.	The whole act.
21 Ric. 2. c. 6	The sons of the persons before attainted excluded from parliament, &c.	Statutu de Anno vicesimo primo. Statute of the Twenty-first Year.	The whole act.
21 Ric. 2. c. 7	A repeal of the annuities, corrodies, &c. granted by those traitors.	Statutu de Anno vicesimo primo. Statute of the Twenty-first Year.	The whole act.
21 Ric. 2. c. 8	The King shall have the collation to all benefices so forfeited.	Statutu de Anno vicesimo primo. Statute of the Twenty-first Year.	The whole act.
21 Ric. 2. c. 9	The county of Chester made a principality, and several castles and towns annexed to the same.	Statutu de Anno vicesimo primo. Statute of the Twenty-first Year.	The whole act.
21 Ric. 2. c. 10	The castles and revenues of the late earl of Warwick shall remain in the King's hands.	Statutu de Anno vicesimo primo. Statute of the Twenty-first Year.	The whole act.
21 Ric. 2. c. 11	And likewise those belonging to the duke of Gloucester.	Statutu de Anno vicesimo primo. Statute of the Twenty-first Year.	The whole act.
21 Ric. 2. c. 12	Treason Act 1397	Statutu de Anno vicesimo primo. Statute of the Twenty-first Year.	The whole act.
21 Ric. 2. c. 13	A reversal of the sentence against Michael de la Pole, late earl of Suffolk.	Statutu de Anno vicesimo primo. Statute of the Twenty-first Year.	The whole act.
21 Ric. 2. c. 14	The King's pardon of robberies, thefts, outrages, and riots, commited in the time of the commotion.	Statutu de Anno vicesimo primo. Statute of the Twenty-first Year.	The whole act.
21 Ric. 2. c. 15	The King's pardon to all his subjects of alienations without licence, intrusions by the heirs after the death of their ancestors, treasons, felonies, &c.	Statutu de Anno vicesimo primo. Statute of the Twenty-first Year.	The whole act.
21 Ric. 2. c. 16	Authority given by parliament to certain commissioners to examine and answer petitions exhibited to the King.	Statutu de Anno vicesimo primo. Statute of the Twenty-first Year.	The whole act.
21 Ric. 2. c. 17	There shall be no licences granted to ship merchandises of the staple to any other place but to Calais.	Statutu de Anno vicesimo primo. Statute of the Twenty-first Year.	The whole act.
21 Ric. 2. c. 18	Stones shall be carried for lastage towards the repair of the beacons, the place called Paradise, and other decayed places in Calais.	Statutu de Anno vicesimo primo. Statute of the Twenty-first Year.	The whole act.
21 Ric. 2. c. 19	A rehearsal and confirmation of the statutes of 25 Edw. III. c. 4. and 45 Edw. III. c. 2. touching the pulling down of wears, mills, stakes, &c.	Statutu de Anno vicesimo primo. Statute of the Twenty-first Year.	The whole act.
21 Ric. 2. c. 20	Whosoever shall pursue to repeal any of these statutes, and that proved in parliament, shall be adjudged a traitor.	Statutu de Anno vicesimo primo. Statute of the Twenty-first Year.	The whole act.
1 Hen. 4. c. 1	A confirmation of the liberties of the church, and of all statutes not repealed. Justice shall be done, and peace kept.	Statutum de Anno Primo. Statute of the First Year. — Except Chapter Six. — In Petitions to the King for Lands, Offices, &c., the Value thereof shall be mentioned.	The whole act.
1 Hen. 4. c. 2	None shall be impeached that did assist King Hen. 4. or helped to pursue King Rich. 2. or his adherents.	Statutum de Anno Primo. Statute of the First Year. — Except Chapter Six. — In Petitions to the King for Lands, Offices, &c., the Value thereof shall be mentioned.	The whole act.
1 Hen. 4. c. 3	A repeal of the whole parliament holden Anno 21 Rich. 2. and of the authority given thereby.	Statutum de Anno Primo. Statute of the First Year. — Except Chapter Six. — In Petitions to the King for Lands, Offices, &c., the Value thereof shall be mentioned.	The whole act.
1 Hen. 4. c. 4	A confirmation of the parliament holden 11 Rich. 2.	Statutum de Anno Primo. Statute of the First Year. — Except Chapter Six. — In Petitions to the King for Lands, Offices, &c., the Value thereof shall be mentioned.	The whole act.
1 Hen. 4. c. 5	A restitution of those, or their heirs, which were attainted at the parliament bolden 21 Rich. 2.	Statutum de Anno Primo. Statute of the First Year. — Except Chapter Six. — In Petitions to the King for Lands, Offices, &c., the Value thereof shall be mentioned.	The whole act.
1 Hen. 4. c. 7	Liveries	Statutum de Anno Primo. Statute of the First Year. — Except Chapter Six. — In Petitions to the King for Lands, Offices, &c., the Value thereof shall be mentioned.	The whole act.
1 Hen. 4. c. 8	Assise maintainable by the disseisee against the King^s patentee of lands.	Statutum de Anno Primo. Statute of the First Year. — Except Chapter Six. — In Petitions to the King for Lands, Offices, &c., the Value thereof shall be mentioned.	The whole act.
1 Hen. 4. c. 9	A confirmation to the purchasers of lands sold, which were forfeited to the King.	Statutum de Anno Primo. Statute of the First Year. — Except Chapter Six. — In Petitions to the King for Lands, Offices, &c., the Value thereof shall be mentioned.	The whole act.
1 Hen. 4. c. 10	Treason Act 1399	Statutum de Anno Primo. Statute of the First Year. — Except Chapter Six. — In Petitions to the King for Lands, Offices, &c., the Value thereof shall be mentioned.	The whole act.
1 Hen. 4. c. 11	How far sheriffs shall be charged with the ancient ferms of the county.	Statutum de Anno Primo. Statute of the First Year. — Except Chapter Six. — In Petitions to the King for Lands, Offices, &c., the Value thereof shall be mentioned.	The whole act.
1 Hen. 4. c. 12	A confirmation of former statutes touching pulling down of wears.	Statutum de Anno Primo. Statute of the First Year. — Except Chapter Six. — In Petitions to the King for Lands, Offices, &c., the Value thereof shall be mentioned.	The whole act.
1 Hen. 4. c. 13	A confirmation of former statutes touching pulling down of wears.	Statutum de Anno Primo. Statute of the First Year. — Except Chapter Six. — In Petitions to the King for Lands, Offices, &c., the Value thereof shall be mentioned.	The whole act.
1 Hen. 4. c. 14	Where all sorts of appeals shall be tried and determined.	Statutum de Anno Primo. Statute of the First Year. — Except Chapter Six. — In Petitions to the King for Lands, Offices, &c., the Value thereof shall be mentioned.	The whole act.
1 Hen. 4. c. 15	London	Statutum de Anno Primo. Statute of the First Year. — Except Chapter Six. — In Petitions to the King for Lands, Offices, &c., the Value thereof shall be mentioned.	The whole act.
1 Hen. 4. c. 16	Merchants of London shall be as free to pack their cloths as other merchants.	Statutum de Anno Primo. Statute of the First Year. — Except Chapter Six. — In Petitions to the King for Lands, Offices, &c., the Value thereof shall be mentioned.	The whole act.
1 Hen. 4. c. 17	Strangers may buy and sell within the realm victuals in grose or by retail.	Statutum de Anno Primo. Statute of the First Year. — Except Chapter Six. — In Petitions to the King for Lands, Offices, &c., the Value thereof shall be mentioned.	The whole act.
1 Hen. 4. c. 18	Process against one of the county of Chester, which committeth an offence in another shire.	Statutum de Anno Primo. Statute of the First Year. — Except Chapter Six. — In Petitions to the King for Lands, Offices, &c., the Value thereof shall be mentioned.	The whole act.
1 Hen. 4. c. 19	During three years, for no cloth whereof the dozen exceedeth not 13s. 4d. any subsidy shall be paid, or shall he sealed.	Statutum de Anno Primo. Statute of the First Year. — Except Chapter Six. — In Petitions to the King for Lands, Offices, &c., the Value thereof shall be mentioned.	The whole act.
1 Hen. 4. c. 20	Pardon	Statutum de Anno Primo. Statute of the First Year. — Except Chapter Six. — In Petitions to the King for Lands, Offices, &c., the Value thereof shall be mentioned.	The whole act.
2 Hen. 4. c. 1	Confirmation of liberties, etc.	Confirmation of Liberties, Charters, Statutes, &c.	The whole act.
2 Hen. 4. c. 5	Exportation of gold or silver	Recital of 5 Ric. 2. st. 1. ch. 2. touching the exporting of Gold or Silver. Gold and Silver found in a Course of Exportation shall be forfeit; saving reasonable expenses. Merchants Strangers may export half their Money. 14 Ric. 2. c. 1.	The whole act.
2 Hen. 4. c. 8	Fines	The Fee of the Cyrographer of the Common Pleas for a Fine levied. Forfeiture of Office if the Cyrographer take a greater Fee. Treble Damages to the Party.	The whole act.
2 Hen. 4. c. 9	Relief of certain commissioners	Certain Commissioners made in the Time of Richard 2. may be discharged by their Oaths.	The whole act.
2 Hen. 4. c. 10	Clerk of the Crown, Queen's Bench	The Fee of the Clerk of the Crown of the King's Bench for Indictments.	The whole act.
2 Hen. 4. c. 11	Admiralty jurisdiction	The Statute 13 Ric. 2. stat. 1. c. 5. as to the Admirals Jurisdiction confirmed. Action on the case for any wrongfully sued in the Court of Admiralty. Double damages.	The whole act. (Note: This act was not included in the Statute Law Revision Act 1863 (26 & 27 Vict. c. 125). This act was repealed for England and Wales by the Admiralty Court Act 1861 (24 & 25 Vict. c. 10).)
2 Hen. 4. c. 12	Welshmen	Certain Restraints laid on wholly born Welshmen.	The whole act.
2 Hen. 4. c. 13	Pardon	Recital of the Pardon granted by the Statute 21 Ric. 2. c. 15.; Confirmation thereof; notwithstanding the Repeal by Statute 1 Hen. 4. c. 3.	The whole act.
2 Hen. 4. c. 14	Purveyance	The Statutes of Purveyors confirmed. Purveyance of 40s. or under.	The whole act.
2 Hen. 4. c. 15	Suppression of Heresy Act 1400	The Orthodoxy of the Church of England asserted .	The whole act. (Note: This act was not included in the Statute Law Revision Act 1863 (26 & 27 Vict. c. 125). This act was repealed for England and Wales by the Act of Supremacy 1558 (1 Eliz. 1. c. 1).)
2 Hen. 4. c. 16	Wales and Welshmen	Excesses committed by the Welsh on their English neighbours.	The whole act.
2 Hen. 4. c. 17	Wales and Welshmen	Execution may be done in Wales on Attainder of Welshmen in England.	The whole act.
2 Hen. 4. c. 18	Wales and Welshmen	The Lord Marchers in Wales shall keep sufficient Ward.	The whole act.
2 Hen. 4. c. 19	Wales	Of Suits against Englishmen in Wales.	The whole act.
2 Hen. 4. c. 20	Welshmen	Welshmen shall not purchase lands in England.	The whole act.
2 Hen. 4. c. 21	Liveries	Recital of the Statute 1 Hen. 4. c. 7. respecting Liveries; The Statute 1 Hen. 4. c. 7. confirmed and amended. The Prince may give his Livery.	The whole act.
2 Hen. 4. c. 22	Suits for pardon	Statutes for Pardon of Outlawry, notwithstanding the Statute 11 Ric. 2. c. 1.	The whole act.
2 Hen. 4. c. 23	Marshalsea Court Act 1400	Fees of the Marshal of the Marshalsea of the King's House. Forfeiture of Office by the Marshal, &c. for taking more than their lawful Fees; Treble Damages. Fees of the Servitors of Bills, &c. Penalty.	The whole act.
2 Hen. 4. c. 24	Wages for serving with Duke of York	Processes against such as were with the Duke of York, temp. 23 Ric. 2. for Wages, received by them shall be discharged.	The whole act.
4 Hen. 4. c. 1	Confirmation of liberties, etc.	Confirmation of Liberties, Charters, and Statutes.	The whole act.
4 Hen. 4. c. 2	Indictments, etc.	The Statutes 25 Edw. 3. for the Clergy, confirmed. The Words Insidiatores viarum & depopulatores agrorum, shall not be put in Indictments or Appeals. Clerks shall be allowed their Clergy notwithstanding an Indictment hath the Effect of the Words aforesaid.	The whole act.
4 Hen. 4. c. 3	Benefit of Clergy Act 1402	Liberties of the Church and Clergy confirmed. Clerks convict shall be delivered to the Ordinary, and dealt with according to a Constitution Provincial, to be made; and approved by the King.	The whole act.
4 Hen. 4. c. 4	Crown grants	The King will grant no Lands, &c. but to such as shall deserve them. Penalty for making Requests to the contrary.	The whole act.
4 Hen. 4. c. 6	Cloths	Cloths of London used to be sealed. A Person shall be assigned so to seal them. Cloths not sealed, shall be forfeited.	The whole act.
4 Hen. 4. c. 7	Real actions	Concerning the Special Assise. Recital of 1 Ric. 2. c. 9., giving Remedy against Disseisors; Action for the Rent shall lie, against a Disseisor, during his Life; against Pernor of the Freehold, within a Year.	The whole act.
4 Hen. 4. c. 8	Forcible entries	Mischiefs accruing from forcible Entries; A special Assise grantable in such Cases. Punishment; Imprisonment and double Damages. Damages for carrying away the Disseisee's Goods or Chattels.	The whole act.
4 Hen. 4. c. 9	Relief of commissioners	Remedy for Commissioners distrained to return Commissions of which they had not any Notice.	The whole act.
4 Hen. 4. c. 11	Weirs Act 1402	Former statutes touching Wears, &c. confirmed. Commissioners for the enquiring of Wears, &c. Their pay.	The whole act.
4 Hen. 4. c. 13	Military service	St. 1 Edw. 3. st. 2. ch. 5; 18 Edw. 3. chapter 7; 25 Edw. 3. st. 5. ch. 8, touching Service in War, confirmed. Persons holding of the King to do any Service in War shall be bound to do the same.	The whole act.
4 Hen. 4. c. 14	Labourers	Labourers shall not be hired by the Week; nor paid for Holidays.	The whole act.
4 Hen. 4. c. 17	Monastic orders	Infants shall not be received into Orders of Friars without the Consent of Parents. The Chancellor shall have Jurisdiction herein. The several Principals of the Four Orders in England, swear to observe this Statute.	The whole act.
4 Hen. 4. c. 18	Attorneys	Attornies shall be examined by the Judges and enrolled and sworn.	The whole act. (Note: This act was not included in the Statute Law Revision Act 1863 (26 & 27 Vict. c. 125). This act was repealed for England and Wales by the Solicitors Act 1843 (6 & 7 Vict. c. 73).)
4 Hen. 4. c. 19	Attorneys	No Officer of a Lord of a Franchise shall be Attorney in the same.	The whole act.
4 Hen. 4. c. 24	Cloths	Statute 17 Ric. 2. chapter 5. The Aulnage of Cloths may be farmed.	The whole act.
4 Hen. 4. c. 26	Penal laws against the Welsh (Wales)	Englishmen shall be convict by Welshmen in Wales.	The whole act.
4 Hen. 4. c. 28	Penal laws against the Welsh (Wales)	Against Congregations in Wales.	The whole act.
4 Hen. 4. c. 30	Wales	No Victual or Armour shall be carried into Wales.	The whole act.
4 Hen. 4. c. 31	Wales and Welshmen	Welshmen shall not have Castles.	The whole act.
4 Hen. 4. c. 32	Wales and Welshmen	No Welshman shall bear Office.	The whole act.
4 Hen. 4. c. 33	Wales and Welshmen	Castles and Walled Towns in Wales shall be kept by Englishmen.	The whole act.
4 Hen. 4. c. 34	Wales and Welshmen	Englishmen married to Welsh women shall not bear Office in Wales.	The whole act.
4 Hen. 4. c. 35	Tanning	Recital of the Statute 13 Ric. 2. St. 1. ch. 12. Shoemakers may tan Leather; till the next Parliament.	The whole act.
5 Hen. 4. c. 3	Watching	Watch shall be made upon the Coasts, as under Statute of Winton, 13 Edw. I. Justices of Peace shall enquire hereof.	The whole act.
5 Hen. 4. c. 8	Wager of Law	In Actions of Debt, as on Accounts before Auditors, the Judges may receive Defendants to their Law, or try the Matter by Inquest.	The whole act.
5 Hen. 4. c. 9	Trade Act 1403	The Statute 4 Hen. 4. c. 15. confirmed; Customers shall take Surety of Foreign Merchants to observe that Statute. Foreign Merchants Aliens shall sell their Merchandise. Aliens shall not sell any Merchandise to each other. Hosts shall be appointed to Merchants Aliens.	The whole act.
5 Hen. 4. c. 12	Execution on Statute Merchant	Execution allowed on a Statute Merchant once showed in Court.	The whole act.
5 Hen. 4. c. 14	Fines	To prevent Forgery, &c. of Notes, &c. of Fines of Lands; the Writs whereon they are levied shall be enrolled in the Court of Common Pleas.	The whole act.
5 Hen. 4. c. 15	Pardon	The King's General Pardon. Exceptions.	The whole act.
6 Hen. 4. c. 1	First fruits	Statuta de Anno sexto. Statutes of the Sixth Year. — Except Chapter Two. — The Statute 1 Hen. 4. chapter 6, respecting Petitions to the King for Lands, &c., shall not extend to the Queen nor the Princes.	The whole act.
6 Hen. 4. c. 3	Sheriffs, Escheators, etc.	Statuta de Anno sexto. Statutes of the Sixth Year. — Except Chapter Two. — The Statute 1 Hen. 4. chapter 6, respecting Petitions to the King for Lands, &c., shall not extend to the Queen nor the Princes.	The whole act.
6 Hen. 4. c. 4	Exportation	Statuta de Anno sexto. Statutes of the Sixth Year. — Except Chapter Two. — The Statute 1 Hen. 4. chapter 6, respecting Petitions to the King for Lands, &c., shall not extend to the Queen nor the Princes.	The whole act.
7 Hen. 4. c. 4	Protections	1 Ric. 2. c. 12. No Protection allowable in Actions against Gaolers, for Escapes.	The whole act.
7 Hen. 4. c. 8	Benefices	No Licence or Pardon shall be granted on Provision to a Benefice full of an Incumbent.	The whole act.
7 Hen. 4. c. 10	Cloths Act 1405	Length and Breadth of Cloths, Cloths of less Dimensions forfeitable.	The whole act.
7 Hen. 4. c. 11	Relief of Commissioners	Commissioners not receiving their Commissions shall be discharged in the Exchequer upon Oath.	The whole act.
7 Hen. 4. c. 14	Liveries Act 1405	Stat. of 1 Hen. 4. c. 7. and 1 Ric . 2. c. 7. touching the giving of Liveries recited . No Congregation or Company shall make any Livery of Cloth or Hats.	The whole act.
7 Hen. 4. c. 16	Annuities from the Crown	Annuities granted by the Crown shall be paid according to Priority of the Grants.	The whole act.
7 Hen. 4. c. 17	Labourers Act 1405	Confirmation of Statutes 25 Edw. 3. Stat. 2. and 12 Ric. 2. c. 3. concerning Labourers. No one shall put his Child apprentice, unless he have 20s. per Annum in Land or Rent. Every one may put his Child to School. Certificate of Value of Lands of Parents of Apprentices. Penalty for receiving an Apprentice contrary hereto. Labourers to be sworn, or be put in the Stocks.	The whole act.
7 Hen. 4. c. 18	Pardon	None shall be punished for repressing of the late Insurrection. Pardons.	The whole act.
9 Hen. 4. c. 1	Confirmation of Liberties	Statuta de anno nono. Statutes of the Ninth Year.	The whole act.
9 Hen. 4. c. 2	Aulnage	Statuta de anno nono. Statutes of the Ninth Year.	The whole act.
9 Hen. 4. c. 3	Felons in South Wales shall be taken, or the country shall satisfy for their offences.	Statuta de anno nono. Statutes of the Ninth Year.	The whole act.
9 Hen. 4. c. 4	Disclaimers in felony in Wales shall be utterly excluded and put out.	Statuta de anno nono. Statutes of the Ninth Year.	The whole act.
9 Hen. 4. c. 5	Lords of ancient demesne, or mayors, &c. name disseissors in assise, to take away their franchise.	Statuta de anno nono. Statutes of the Ninth Year.	The whole act.
9 Hen. 4. c. 6	Cloths Act 1407	Statuta de anno nono. Statutes of the Ninth Year.	The whole act.
9 Hen. 4. c. 7	Goods shall be chargeable for the payment of the quinzime, where they were at the time when the same was granted.	Statuta de anno nono. Statutes of the Ninth Year.	The whole act.
9 Hen. 4. c. 8	The carrying of money out of the realm to the court of Rome prohibited; and all statutes against provisors, and translation of archbishopricks, &c. confirmed.	Statuta de anno nono. Statutes of the Ninth Year.	The whole act.
9 Hen. 4. c. 9	Elections to spiritual promotions shall be free, and not interrupted by the pope or the King.	Statuta de anno nono. Statutes of the Ninth Year.	The whole act.
9 Hen. 4. c. 10	A pardon granted by the King to all that have purchased provisions, or translations to archbishopricks, bishopricks, &c.	Statuta de anno nono. Statutes of the Ninth Year.	The whole act.
11 Hen. 4. c. 1	Elections to Parliament	D'Statutis Ao xjo. Of the Statutes of the Eleventh Year.	The whole act.
11 Hen. 4. c. 2	Customers	D'Statutis Ao xjo. Of the Statutes of the Eleventh Year.	The whole act.
11 Hen. 4. c. 3	Enrollment of Records	D'Statutis Ao xjo. Of the Statutes of the Eleventh Year.	The whole act.
11 Hen. 4. c. 4	Unlawful Games	D'Statutis Ao xjo. Of the Statutes of the Eleventh Year.	The whole act.
11 Hen. 4. c. 5	Gally Half-Pence	D'Statutis Ao xjo. Of the Statutes of the Eleventh Year.	The whole act.
11 Hen. 4. c. 6	Sealing of Cloths	D'Statutis Ao xjo. Of the Statutes of the Eleventh Year.	The whole act.
11 Hen. 4. c. 7	Merchants strangers shall pay the customs, &c. granted to the King by the commons for cloth cut in pieces, or garments, proportionably after the rate of a whole piece.	D'Statutis Ao xjo. Of the Statutes of the Eleventh Year.	The whole act.
11 Hen. 4. c. 8	The lord chancellor shall send the estreats of exchanges taken of merchants into the exchequer every fifteen days.	D'Statutis Ao xjo. Of the Statutes of the Eleventh Year.	The whole act.
11 Hen. 4. c. 9	Jurors	D'Statutis Ao xjo. Of the Statutes in the Eleventh Year.	The whole act.
13 Hen. 4. c. 1	Confirmation of Liberties	D'Statutis xiijo H. iv Of the Statutes in the Thirteenth Year of K. Henry IV. — Except Chapter Seven. — Justices of Peace and Sheriffs shall arrest all Rioters; and record their offences; and enquire thereof. Certificate of Justices, &c. shall be equivalent to a Presentment of Trespass, Traverse of a Riot triable in the King's Bench. Conviction of Offenders for Default of Appearance. The Penalty of the nearest Justices, &c. omitting to execute this act.	The whole act.
13 Hen. 4. c. 2	Justices of Assize	D'Statutis xiijo H. iv Of the Statutes in the Thirteenth Year of K. Henry IV. — Except Chapter Seven. — Justices of Peace and Sheriffs shall arrest all Rioters; and record their offences; and inquire thereof. Certificate of Justices, &c. shall be equivalent to a Presentment of Trespass, Traverse of a Riot triable in the King's Bench. Conviction of Offenders for Default of Appearance. The Penalty of the nearest Justices, &c. omitting to execute this act.	The whole act.
13 Hen. 4. c. 3	Liveries	D'Statutis xiijo H. iv Of the Statutes in the Thirteenth Year of K. Henry IV. — Except Chapter Seven. — Justices of Peace and Sheriffs shall arrest all Rioters; and record their offences; and enquire thereof. Certificate of Justices, &c. shall be equivalent to a Presentment of Trespass, Traverse of a Riot triable in the King's Bench. Conviction of Offenders for Default of Appearance. The Penalty of the nearest Justices, &c. omitting to execute this act.	The whole act.
13 Hen. 4. c. 4	Cloths	D'Statutis xiijo H. iv Of the Statutes in the Thirteenth Year of K. Henry IV. — Except Chapter Seven. — Justices of Peace and Sheriffs shall arrest all Rioters; and record their offences; and enquire thereof. Certificate of Justices, &c. shall be equivalent to a Presentment of Trespass, Traverse of a Riot triable in the King's Bench. Conviction of Offenders for Default of Appearance. The Penalty of the nearest Justices, &c. omitting to execute this act.	The whole act.
13 Hen. 4. c. 5	Customers	D'Statutis xiijo H. iv Of the Statutes in the Thirteenth Year of K. Henry IV. — Except Chapter Seven. — Justices of Peace and Sheriffs shall arrest all Rioters; and record their offences; and inquire thereof. Certificate of Justices, &c. shall be equivalent to a Presentment of Trespass, Traverse of a Riot triable in the King's Bench. Conviction of Offenders for Default of Appearance. The Penalty of the nearest Justices, &c. omitting to execute this act.	The whole act.
13 Hen. 4. c. 6	Foreign Money	D'Statutis xiijo H. iv Of the Statutes in the Thirteenth Year of K. Henry IV. — Except Chapter Seven. — Justices of Peace and Sheriffs shall arrest all Rioters; and record their offences; and enquire thereof. Certificate of Justices, &c. shall be equivalent to a Presentment of Trespass, Traverse of a Riot triable in the King's Bench. Conviction of Offenders for Default of Appearance. The Penalty of the nearest Justices, &c. omitting to execute this act.	The whole act.
1 Hen. 5. c. 1	Parliamentary Elections Act 1413	Statutes for the election of Knights of the shire confirmed. Elected and electors shall be resident in the several shires, cities, &c.	The whole act. (Note: This act was not included in the Statute Law Revision Act 1863 (26 & 27 Vict. c. 125). This act was repealed for England and Wales by the Parliamentary Elections (No. 2) Act 1774 (14 Geo. 3. c. 58).)
1 Hen. 5. c. 2	Weirs	The Statutes relating to Wears, &c. confirmed.	The whole act.
1 Hen. 5. c. 3	Forgery	Forging of false Deeds. Party grieved may sue. Party guilty shall be fined.	The whole act.
1 Hen. 5. c. 6	Wales	No Actions shall be brought by Welshmen in respect of Injuries sustained in the late Rebellion.	The whole act.
1 Hen. 5. c. 8	Irish Mendicants, etc.	Irishmen and Irish Clerks Mendicant shall depart the Realm. Exceptions.	The whole act.
1 Hen. 5. c. 9	Grants of Revenues, etc. of Calais	Recital of Grants of the Revenues, Offices, &c. of Calais to certain Persons by Letters Patents. All such Letters Patents annulled. The said Revenues, &c. shall be applied to the Maintenance of Calais. Exception for the Duke of Clarence.	The whole act.
1 Hen. 5. c. 10	Corn Measure Act 1413	The lawful measure of Corn, according to former Ordinances. London Measure called the Vat. Former Ordinances confirmed. By what Measures Purveyors, &c. shall buy Corn. Punishment of Offenders.	The whole act.
2 Hen. 5. Stat. 1. c. 4	Quarter Sessions Act 1414	Statute 12 Ric. II. chap. 3, &c. confirmed. Justices of the Peace may grant Writs to the Sheriffs for fugitive Servants or Labourers. The Statutes of Labourers shall be executed, and sent to the Sheriffs; and by them to the Justices of the Peace. Times when Justices of the Quorum resident in the Shire, except Lords, &c., shall hold their Quarter Sessions. Justices of Peace may examine and commit Persons accused to Oath:— Except from "And that the Justices of the Peace in every Shire" to "every Year from henceforth."	The whole act.
2 Hen. 5. Stat. 1. c. 5	Outrages in certain franchises	Outrages committed by Persons dwelling in Tyndall and Exhamshire in Northumberland; Process against such Offenders.	The whole act.
2 Hen. 5. Stat. 1. c. 6	Safe Conducts Act 1414	Breaches of Truces and Safe-Conducts of the King, declared to be High Treason. Conservators of Truce shall be appointed in the Ports. Their Authority as to Offences done upon the Sea. The Process to be used. Except in Cases of Homicide. Authority of Conservators as to Offences within the Bodies of Counties. Process thereon. Additions of the Parties indicted. Two Lawyers shall be associate in Commission; with the Conservator. The Authority of such Commissioners. Oath of the Commissioners. Seal of the Conservator. Masters, &c. of Ships shall be sworn to keep Truces, &c., and their Names, &c. inrolled. Conservator shall be informed of Prizes taken from the King's Enemies. Punishment of Owners and Masters of Ships offending. Owners not punishable, unless on board. Forfeitures to the Admiral. Authority of Conservators within the Cinque Ports. Homicide. The Warden of the Cinque Ports shall have all Forfeitures there. Ordinance shall commence after proclamation.	The whole act.
2 Hen. 5. Stat. 1. c. 7	Suppression of Heresy Act 1414	Suggested evils from the religious sect called Lollards. Chancellor, Judges, &c. shall be sworn against Lollardry; and assist the Ordinaries and Commissaries in arresting Lollards, &c. Forfeiture of lands and goods of persons convict of heresy. Justices of the King's Bench, &c. shall inquire of heretics . Capias against them. Conisance of heresy belongs to the Spiritual Judges. Heretics indicted may be bailed . Commissaries of the Ordinary. Qualification of Jurors . Breaking of Prisons by persons arrested. The heirs of persons not convict may enter into their lands.	The whole act.
2 Hen. 5. Stat. 2. c. 9	Murder, etc.	Commission of Murders, Riots, &c. and the Flight of Offenders; on complaint in Chancery of any such Flight a Bill shall be made for the King; Whereupon the issue a Capias returnable in Chancery; and the Offender, if taken, or yielding, may be bailed by the Chancellor. If such Offender be not taken, &c. a Writ of Proclamation shall issue returnable in the King's Bench, and if Nonappearance the Offender shall be attainted. Exceptions of Riots shall be testified to the Chancellor by Two Justices and the Sheriff. Process within County Palatine, &c. Continuance of Act.	The whole act.
2 Hen. 5. Stat. 2. c. 2	Chaplains	Alia Statuta de eode Anno. Other Statutes of the same Year. — Except Chapter One. — Justices of the Peace shall be appointed from the Residents: Exceptions.	The whole act.
2 Hen. 5. Stat. 2. c. 3	Jurors	Alia Statuta de eode Anno. Other Statutes of the same Year. — Except Chapter One. — Justices of the Peace shall be appointed from the Residents: Exceptions.	The whole act.
2 Hen. 5. Stat. 2. c. 4	Gilding of Silver Act 1414	Alia Statuta de eode Anno. Other Statutes of the same Year. — Except Chapter One. — Justices of the Peace shall be appointed from the Residents: Exceptions. This act was already repealed by Repeal of Obsolete Statutes Act 1856 (19 & 20 Vict. c. 64)	The whole act.
2 Hen. 5. Stat. 2. c. 5	Appearance of Welshmen	Alia Statuta de eode Anno. Other Statutes of the same Year. — Except Chapter One. — Justices of the Peace shall be appointed from the Residents: Exceptions.	The whole act.
2 Hen. 5. Stat. 2. c. 6	Staple	Alia Statuta de eode Anno. Other Statutes of the same Year. — Except Chapter One. — Justices of the Peace shall be appointed from the Residents: Exceptions.	The whole act.
3 Hen. 5. c. 1	Money Act 1415	Statuta de anno t'cio. Statutes of the Third Year.	The whole act.
4 Hen. 5. Stat. 1. c. 1	Confirmation of Liberties	Statuta de anno quarto. Statutes of the Fourth Year.	The whole act.
4 Hen. 5. Stat. 1. c. 2	Attorneys	Statuta de anno quarto. Statutes of the Fourth Year.	The whole act.
4 Hen. 5. Stat. 1. c. 3	Bretons	Statuta de anno quarto. Statutes of the Fourth Year.	The whole act.
4 Hen. 5. Stat. 1. c. 4	Provisors	Statuta de anno quarto. Statutes of the Fourth Year.	The whole act.
4 Hen. 5. Stat. 1. c. 5	Attaint	Statuta de anno quarto. Statutes of the Fourth Year.	The whole act.
4 Hen. 5. Stat. 1. c. 6	Treason Act 1415	Statuta de anno quarto. Statutes of the Fourth Year. This act was already repealed by the Treason Act 1553 (1 Mar. Sess. 1. c. 1)	The whole act.
4 Hen. 5. Stat. 1. c. 7	Forgery Act 1415	Statuta de anno quarto. Statutes of the Fourth Year.	The whole act.
4 Hen. 5. Stat. 1. c. 8	Proving of Testaments	Statuta de anno quarto. Statutes of the Fourth Year.	The whole act.
4 Hen. 5. Stat. 2. c. 2	Sheriffs	Statuta de eodem Anno 4. Statutes of the same Fourth Year, A.D. 1416. — Except Chapter One. — Charters and Statutes confirmed.	The whole act.
4 Hen. 5. Stat. 2. c. 3	Pattens Act 1416	Statuta de eodem Anno 4. Statutes of the same Fourth Year, A.D. 1416. — Except Chapter One. — Charters and Statutes confirmed.	The whole act.
4 Hen. 5. Stat. 2. c. 4	Wages	Statuta de eodem Anno 4. Statutes of the same Fourth Year, A.D. 1416. — Except Chapter One. — Charters and Statutes confirmed.	The whole act.
4 Hen. 5. Stat. 2. c. 5	Merchant strangers	Statuta de eodem Anno 4. Statutes of the same Fourth Year, A.D. 1416. — Except Chapter One. — Charters and Statutes confirmed.	The whole act.
4 Hen. 5. Stat. 2. c. 6	Irish	Statuta de eodem Anno 4. Statutes of the same Fourth Year, A.D. 1416. — Except Chapter One. — Charters and Statutes confirmed.	The whole act.
4 Hen. 5. Stat. 2. c. 7	In what case letters of marque may be granted.	Statuta de eodem Anno 4. Statutes of the same Fourth Year, A.D. 1416. — Except Chapter One. — Charters and Statutes confirmed.	The whole act.
4 Hen. 5. Stat. 2. c. 8	The King's pardon of the suit of his peace, and of certain issues lost.	Statuta de eodem Anno 4. Statutes of the same Fourth Year, A.D. 1416. — Except Chapter One. — Charters and Statutes confirmed.	The whole act.
5 Hen. 5. c. 1	Attorneys	Ordinacio anno quinto. An Ordinance in the Fifth Year.	The whole act.
7 Hen. 5. c. 1	Indictments, forgery	Indictments in the Co. Palatine of Lancaster for Treasons laid in a place not existing. Before award of exigent on such indictments there shall be an inquest to ascertain whether the place exist or not. Punishment of persons so prosecuting indictments, &c. imprisonment and fine. Process against forgers, &c. of false deeds by capias and exigent.	The whole act. (Note: This act was not included in the Statute Law Revision Act 1863 (26 & 27 Vict. c. 125). This act was repealed for England and Wales by Criminal Law Act 1826 (7 Geo. 4 c. 64).)
8 Hen. 5. c. 1	Parliament	Statuta de anno octavo. Statutes of the Eighth Year.	The whole act.
8 Hen. 5. c. 2	Gold and Silver	Statuta de anno octavo. Statutes of the Eighth Year.	The whole act.
8 Hen. 5. c. 3	Gold and Silver	Statuta de anno octavo. Statutes of the Eighth Year. This act was already repealed by Repeal of Obsolete Statutes Act 1856 (19 & 20 Vict. c. 64)	The whole act.
9 Hen. 5. Stat. 1. c. 2	Outlawries Act 1421	On Outlawries in divers Counties, Goods and Lands in other Counties shall not be forfeited. The Statute 1 Hen. 4. c. 18. as to Cheshire, &c. confirmed.	The whole act.
9 Hen. 5. Stat. 1. c. 3	Assizes Protection, etc. Act 1421	Assises shall be taken as heretofore. In Protections for Persons beyond Sea being in the King's Service, &c. Novel Disseisins shall not be excepted. For saving Rights of Reversioners, so being in the King's Service, if not named in such Assises. The Council may give further Relief.	The whole act.
9 Hen. 5. Stat. 1. c. 5	Sheriffs, etc.	Recital of St. 14 Edw. 3. Stat. 1. cc. 7, 8., concerning Sheriffs and Escheators. The King may appoint Sheriffs, &c. for Four Years.	The whole act.
9 Hen. 5. Stat. 1. c. 6	Mint at Calais	A Mint allowed at Calais.	The whole act.
9 Hen. 5. Stat. 1. c. 8	Offences by Scholars of Oxford	Offences committed by Scholars at Oxford. Process against such Offenders. Certificate to the Chancellor of the University. Banishment from the University thereupon.	The whole act.
9 Hen. 5. Stat. 1. c. 9	Abbots, etc.	Abbots and Priors shall not be appointed to collect the Dismes out of their own Counties.	The whole act.
9 Hen. 5. Stat. 1. c. 11	Gold Coin Act 1421	English Gold Coin shall be received by Weight. Re-coinage of Gold Money.	The whole act.
9 Hen. 5. Stat. 2. c. 1	Money	Alia statuta de eodem anno nono. Other Statutes of the same Ninth Year. Statute the Second. — Except Chapter Eleven. — For the Repair of Roads and Bridges at Burford and Culhamford, between Abingdon & Dorchester.	The whole act.
9 Hen. 5. Stat. 2. c. 2	Money	Alia statuta de eodem anno nono. Other Statutes of the same Ninth Year. Statute the Second. — Except Chapter Eleven. — For the Repair of Roads and Bridges at Burford and Culhamford, between Abingdon & Dorchester.	The whole act.
9 Hen. 5. Stat. 2. c. 3	Money	Alia statuta de eodem anno nono. Other Statutes of the same Ninth Year. Statute the Second. — Except Chapter Eleven. — For the Repair of Roads and Bridges at Burford and Culhamford, between Abingdon & Dorchester.	The whole act.
9 Hen. 5. Stat. 2. c. 4	Gold and Silver	Alia statuta de eodem anno nono. Other Statutes of the same Ninth Year. Statute the Second. — Except Chapter Eleven. — For the Repair of Roads and Bridges at Burford and Culhamford, between Abingdon & Dorchester.	The whole act.
9 Hen. 5. Stat. 2. c. 5	Mint at Calais (No. 2)	Alia statuta de eodem anno nono. Other Statutes of the same Ninth Year. Statute the Second. — Except Chapter Eleven. — For the Repair of Roads and Bridges at Burford and Culhamford, between Abingdon & Dorchester.	The whole act.
9 Hen. 5. Stat. 2. c. 6	Money	Alia statuta de eodem anno nono. Other Statutes of the same Ninth Year. Statute the Second. — Except Chapter Eleven. — For the Repair of Roads and Bridges at Burford and Culhamford, between Abingdon & Dorchester.	The whole act.
9 Hen. 5. Stat. 2. c. 7	Gold Measure	Alia statuta de eodem anno nono. Other Statutes of the same Ninth Year. Statute the Second. — Except Chapter Eleven. — For the Repair of Roads and Bridges at Burford and Culhamford, between Abingdon & Dorchester.	The whole act.
9 Hen. 5. Stat. 2. c. 8	Weights	Alia statuta de eodem anno nono. Other Statutes of the same Ninth Year. Statute the Second. — Except Chapter Eleven. — For the Repair of Roads and Bridges at Burford and Culhamford, between Abingdon & Dorchester.	The whole act.
9 Hen. 5. Stat. 2. c. 9	Exchanges Act 1421	Alia statuta de eodem anno nono. Other Statutes of the same Ninth Year. Statute the Second. — Except Chapter Eleven. — For the Repair of Roads and Bridges at Burford and Culhamford, between Abingdon & Dorchester.	The whole act.
9 Hen. 5. Stat. 2. c. 10	Tithes	Alia statuta de eodem anno nono. Other Statutes of the same Ninth Year. Statute the Second. — Except Chapter Eleven. — For the Repair of Roads and Bridges at Burford and Culhamford, between Abingdon & Dorchester.	The whole act.
1 Hen. 6. c. 1	Mint	Statuta de Anno primo. Statutes of the First Year.	The whole act.
1 Hen. 6. c. 2	Purveyance	Statuta de Anno primo. Statutes of the First Year.	The whole act.
1 Hen. 6. c. 3	Irishmen	Statuta de Anno primo. Statutes of the First Year.	The whole act.
1 Hen. 6. c. 4	Mint	Statuta de Anno primo. Statutes of the First Year.	The whole act.
1 Hen. 6. c. 5	A certain allowance made to those which were retained to serve King Hen. V. in his wars. Provision for the redemption of the jewels mortgages by King. Hen. V.	Statuta de Anno primo. Statutes of the First Year.	The whole act.
1 Hen. 6. c. 6	Exchanges.	Statuta de Anno primo. Statutes of the First Year.	The whole act.
2 Hen. 6. c. 3	Duke of Bedford Act 1423	John Duke of Bedford being in the King's Service allowed to appear, in Suits by Attorney.	The whole act.
2 Hen. 6. c. 4	Staple	Recital of an Ordinance of 36 Edw. 3. respecting Merchandises of the Staple; Recital of an Ordinance of 1 Hen. 4., as to Merchandises of the Staple. Recital of St. 2 Hen. V. stat. 2. c. 6. as to such Merchandises; all existing Statutes relating thereto confirmed. All Merchandises of the Staple shall be carried to Calais. Licences.	The whole act.
2 Hen. 6. c. 6	Exportation of Gold or Silver	The Statute 5 Hen. 5. st. 1. c. 5. for a Mint at Calais confirmed. No Gold or Silver shall be carried out of the Realm, except for Soldiers. Reward to Informer. Exceptions; Ransoms for Prisoners, &c. Merchants Aliens shall be bound not to carry Gold out of the Realm.	The whole act.
2 Hen. 6. c. 7	Tanners	Cordwainers shall not be Tanners: Penalty. Penalty on Tanners of defective Leather. Recovery of Penalties.	The whole act.
2 Hen. 6. c. 8	Irishmen	The Statute 1 Hen. 6. c. 3. touching Irishmen, in England, confirmed. By whom the same Irishmen shall be taken.	The whole act.
2 Hen. 6. c. 9	Currency	The Money called Blanks abolished. Penalty on paying or receiving thereof; as under Statute 3 Hen. 5. c. 1.	The whole act.
2 Hen. 6. c. 10	Embroidery	Deceitful Works of Embroidery of Gold and Silver shall be forfeited.	The whole act.
2 Hen. 6. c. 11	Certain Outlawries	Concerning the Reversal of Outlawries pronounced against Persons whilst abroad in the Service of the King.	The whole act.
2 Hen. 6. c. 12	River Thames	The Justices of the Peace of certain Counties shall enquire of Weirs, &c. upon the Thames. Upon the Inquisitions certified into the King's Bench, the Judges shall award Process; and the Nuisances to be removed.	The whole act.
2 Hen. 6. c. 13	Patent Officers in Courts	All Patent-Officers in the King's Courts shall be sworn to appoint sufficient Clerks.	The whole act.
2 Hen. 6. c. 15	Mint	The Master of the Mint shall keep his Allay in making of the true Value. The King's Assayer and Controller shall be present; their Oaths & Functions. The Master of the Mint and the Exchanger shall convert into Coin all the Gold and Silver which they receive. The Master of the Mint shall make small Money.	The whole act.
2 Hen. 6. c. 16	Price of Silver	The Price of a Pound of Silver in Plate, Piece, or Mass.	The whole act.
2 Hen. 4. c. 18	Labourers	Recital of St. 2 Hen. 5. st. 1. ch. 4. respecting Servants and Labourers. Justices of the Peace empowered to proceed against the Masters as well as the Servants. Penalty upon Sheriffs, &c. for letting convicted Offenders to Bail. Justices may call before them Artificers and Victuallers, and regulate their Wages and Prices. Continuance of Ordinance.	The whole act.
2 Hen. 6. c. 19	Fish	The penalty of fastening trinks or nets across any river. Owners of trinks may fish with them by hand.	The whole act.
2 Hen. 6. c. 20	Real Actions	The Statute Westm. 2. 13 Edw. 1. ch. 3. recited; The Reversioners, &c. mentioned therein may be received to defend their Right at any Time before Judgment. Continuance of Ordinance.	The whole act.
2 Hen. 6. c. 21	Escape Act 1423	Escape of Prisoners, committed for High Treason, declared to be Treason. The Lords of the Fee shall have the Forfeitures. Continuance of Ordinance.	The whole act.
4 Hen. 6. c. 1	Sheriffs	Statutes of the Fourth Year of K. Henry, 6. — Except Chapter Three. — Recital of the Statute 9 Hen. 5. st. 1. ch. 4. reciting Stat. 14 Edw. 3. st. 1. c. 6. for Amendment of Errors in Process, by Misprison of Clerk, as well after Judgment as before: The said Statutes confirmed, as well after Judgment on Verdict as on Dernurrer. Exception as to Wales, and Records of Outlawry.	The whole act.
4 Hen. 6. c. 2	Continuance of Statutes	Statutes of the Fourth Year of K. Henry, 6. — Except Chapter Three. — Recital of the Statute 9 Hen. 5. st. 1. ch. 4. reciting Stat. 14 Edw. 3. st. 1. c. 6. for Amendment of Errors in Process, by Misprison of Clerk, as well after Judgment as before: The said Statutes confirmed, as well after Judgment on Verdict as on Dernurrer. Exception as to Wales, and Records of Outlawry.	The whole act.
4 Hen. 6. c. 4	Writs	Statutes of the Fourth Year of K. Henry, 6. — Except Chapter Three. — Recital of the Statute 9 Hen. 5. st. 1. ch. 4. reciting Stat. 14 Edw. 3. st. 1. c. 6. for Amendment of Errors in Process, by Misprison of Clerk, as well after Judgment as before: The said Statutes confirmed, as well after Judgment on Verdict as on Dernurrer. Exception as to Wales, and Records of Outlawry.	The whole act.
4 Hen. 6. c. 5	Corn	Statutes of the Fourth Year of K. Henry, 6. — Except Chapter Three. — Recital of the Statute 9 Hen. 5. st. 1. ch. 4. reciting Stat. 14 Edw. 3. st. 1. c. 6. for Amendment of Errors in Process, by Misprison of Clerk, as well after Judgment as before: The said Statutes confirmed, as well after Judgment on Verdict as on Dernurrer. Exception as to Wales, and Records of Outlawry.	The whole act.
6 Hen. 6. c. 2	Assizes	Statutes of the Fourth Year of K. Henry, 6. — Except Chapter Three. — Recital of the Statute 9 Hen. 5. st. 1. ch. 4. reciting Stat. 14 Edw. 3. st. 1. c. 6. for Amendment of Errors in Process, by Misprison of Clerk, as well after Judgment as before: The said Statutes confirmed, as well after Judgment on Verdict as on Dernurrer. Exception as to Wales, and Records of Outlawry.	The whole act.
6 Hen. 6. c. 3	Wages of Artificers	Statutes of the Fourth Year of K. Henry, 6. — Except Chapter Three. — Recital of the Statute 9 Hen. 5. st. 1. ch. 4. reciting Stat. 14 Edw. 3. st. 1. c. 6. for Amendment of Errors in Process, by Misprison of Clerk, as well after Judgment as before: The said Statutes confirmed, as well after Judgment on Verdict as on Dernurrer. Exception as to Wales, and Records of Outlawry.	The whole act.
6 Hen. 6. c. 4	Parliament Act 1427	Statutes of the Fourth Year of K. Henry, 6. — Except Chapter Three. — Recital of the Statute 9 Hen. 5. st. 1. ch. 4. reciting Stat. 14 Edw. 3. st. 1. c. 6. for Amendment of Errors in Process, by Misprison of Clerk, as well after Judgment as before: The said Statutes confirmed, as well after Judgment on Verdict as on Dernurrer. Exception as to Wales, and Records of Outlawry.	The whole act.
6 Hen. 6. c. 5	Sewers Act 1427	Statutes of the Fourth Year of K. Henry, 6. — Except Chapter Three. — Recital of the Statute 9 Hen. 5. st. 1. ch. 4. reciting Stat. 14 Edw. 3. st. 1. c. 6. for Amendment of Errors in Process, by Misprison of Clerk, as well after Judgment as before: The said Statutes confirmed, as well after Judgment on Verdict as on Dernurrer. Exception as to Wales, and Records of Outlawry.	The whole act.
6 Hen. 6. c. 6	Wool	Statutes of the Fourth Year of K. Henry, 6. — Except Chapter Three. — Recital of the Statute 9 Hen. 5. st. 1. ch. 4. reciting Stat. 14 Edw. 3. st. 1. c. 6. for Amendment of Errors in Process, by Misprison of Clerk, as well after Judgment as before: The said Statutes confirmed, as well after Judgment on Verdict as on Dernurrer. Exception as to Wales, and Records of Outlawry.	The whole act.
8 Hen. 6. c. 3	Commissioners of Sewers	The Statute 6 H. 6. c. 5. recited; Commissioners of Sewers empowered to execute their own Ordinances.	The whole act.
8 Hen. 6. c. 4	Liveries	For the purpose of executing the Statutes 1 Hen. 4. c. 7., 1 Hen. 4. c. 14., against unlawful liveries, Justices of the Peace, &c. may proceed against offenders by attachment, distress, capias, and exigend. The statutes extended to the Counties of Chester and Lancaster; exception as to the Sheriff of London, Mayors, Serjeants at law, &c., and as to persons serving in war. Persons at their own cost wearing liveries for maintenance shall incur the penalties of the said statutes.	The whole act.
8 Hen. 6. c. 5	Weights, etc. Act 1429	Magna Carta and certain Statutes [See 25 Edw. 1. chapter 25.; 27 Edw. 3. stat. 2. ch. 9.; 27 Edw. 3. stat. 2. ch. 10.; 31 Edw. 3. chapter 5.; 13 Ric. II. stat. 1. ch. 9.] relating to Weights and Measures, confirmed. Every City Borough and Town shall have a common Balance and Weights. No Man shall buy Woollen Yarn, unless to make Cloth; nor measure nor weigh but according to the Standard. Penalties recoverable before Justices of the Peace. Penalty on City or Town not having common Balance and Weights.	The whole act.
8 Hen. 6. c. 6	Treason Act 1429	Burning of Houses, &c. Persons setting Fire to Houses so as to appoint Money to be laid in a certain Place, made High Treason.	The whole act.
8 Hen. 6. c. 7	Electors of Knights of the Shires Act 1429	Electors of Knights of the Shire shall have 40 shillings a year freehold and be resident. The Knights elected shall be resident. Returns of elections by the Sheriffs by Indenture. Sheriffs empowered to examine electors on oath as to their estates . Justices of Assize may inquire of undue returns. Penalty on Sheriffs and Knights in cases of undue returns. Writs of election to Sheriff shall notice this act.	The whole act. (Note: This act was not included in the Statute Law Revision Act 1863 (26 & 27 Vict. c. 125). This act was repealed for England and Wales by the Representation of the People Act 1918 (7 & 8 Geo. 5. c. 64).)
8 Hen. 6. c. 8	Labourers	The Statute 6 H. 6. c. 3, respecting Wages of Labourers, &c. continued.	The whole act.
8 Hen. 6. c. 11	Apprenticeship	Custom of London respecting taking of Apprentices there; The Statute 7 H. 4. c. 17. respecting Apprentices generally; The said Custom of London as to Apprentices confirmed.	The whole act.
8 Hen. 6. c. 13	Protections	In Protections for Persons going with the King to France, Assises of Novel disseisin shall not be excepted. For saving Rights of Reversioners, so being in the King's Service, if not named in such Assises. Exceptions for Entries made since the beginning of this Parliament.	The whole act.
8 Hen. 6. c. 14	Murders, etc.	Recital of the Statute 2 Hen. 5. stat. 1. ch. 9., directing Process of Capias, and Proclamation against Offenders withdrawing themselves; The recited Statute made perpetual. Justices shall certify Riots before Award of Capias. Provision for the County Palatine of Lancaster and other Franchises.	The whole act.
8 Hen. 6. c. 25	Staple	The present Mayor of the Staple of Calais shall stay Two Years in Office.	The whole act.
8 Hen. 6. c. 26	Franchises Act 1429	In Writs of Assise and Personal Actions for Lands or Matters within Franchises, if Defendant make Default after the Lords, &c. of Franchises have returned that they have no Jurisdiction, the Writ shall stand. 9 H. 4. c. 5.	The whole act.
8 Hen. 6. c. 27	Robberies on the Severn	Robberies and Injuries on the Severn, by Rovers of the Forest of Dean, and Hundreds of Bledislow and Westbury, against the Goods and Ships of the Town of Tewkesbury, and others. Proclamation of Council against such Offences. Sheriff of Gloucester, &c. shall make Proclamation for Trespassers to satisfy the Parties injured. On failure the Commonalties of the Forest and Hundreds shall be answerable for the Robberies as under the Statute of Winchester.	The whole act.
8 Hen. 6. c. 29	Inquests	The Statute 27 Edw. 3. st. 2. cap. 8. respecting Inquests de medietate linguae, where Aliens are Parties; The Statute of the Staple; The Statute 28 Edw. 3. chapter 13, confirming and amending the same; The Statute 2 Hen. 5. st. 2. chapter 3. requiring Jurors to have 40s. per Annum; The Statute 2 H. 5. st. 2. c. 3. limited to Inquests to be taken between Denizen and Denizen.	The whole act.
9 Hen. 6. c. 1	Adjournment of Assizes	All Assises and Nisi prius adjourned during this Parliament.	The whole act.
9 Hen. 6. c. 7	Sheriff of Herefordshire Act 1430	Extortions, &c. by Sheriffs in the County of Hereford; Penalty on Sheriffs, &c. of that County for unlawful Inquests, &c. Penalty Forty Pounds. The King or Party grieved may sue. Double Damages to the Party. Continuance of this act.	The whole act.
9 Hen. 6. c. 10	Attorneys	The Statute 4 Henry 5. [3 H. 5. st. 2.] chapter 2, authorizing certain Religious Persons to make Attornies, recited. The said Statute 3 Hen. 5. c. 2. continued during the King's Pleasure.	The whole act.
9 Hen. 6. c. 11	Bastardy	Recital of the Circumstances of the Case of the Coheiress of Edmund Earl of Kent; Claim of Alianour Wife of James Lord Audley, to be the lawful Daughter of the said Edmund Earl of Kent. A Practice to prove the said Alianour Mallyn by the Common Law, who was indeed a Bastard. No Certificate heretofore made, for the said Alianour, shall bind the Parties to the Plea. Whenever Bastardy is alleged, the Judges, upon Prayer of any of the Parties, shall send into Chancery a memorandum of the Issue joined; and thereupon Proclamations shall be made in Chancery, &c. before any Writ be awarded to the Ordinary to certify Bastardy; or in Default, the Certificate of Bastardy shall be void. Certificate to be made on any Writ already issued declared void.	The whole act.
10 Hen. 6. c. 2	Electors of Knights of the Shire Act 1432	The Statute 8 Hen. 6. c. 7. as to Freehold qualification of electors of Knights of the Shire. Such freeholds shall be within the county.	The whole act.
10 Hen. 6. c. 3	Letters of Request	Letters of Request, under the Privy Seal, shall be granted to Subjects whose Goods are taken by Danish Subjects.	The whole act.
10 Hen. 6. c. 4	Appearance of Plaintiffs	Outlawries, &c. in Actions at the Suit of Parties not actually appearing; Filazers, &c. shall not record the personal Appearance of Plaintiffs unless they actually appear, and make Oath of their Identity.	The whole act.
10 Hen. 6. c. 5	Calais Beacons, etc.	St. 21 Ric. 2. c. 18. recited relative to repairing Beacons, &c. at Calais, although repealed by the Terms of Statute 1 H. 4. c. 3, shall be in force and executed.	The whole act.
10 Hen. 6. Stat. 2	Payment of Judges, etc.	P Justic svientibus ad legem & attorn dni Reg. Statute the Second.	The whole act.
11 Hen. 6. c. 2	Real Actions	In Assises to ovel Disseisin, where Sheriffs are named as Disseisors, in order to have Writs of Execution directed to the Coroners: In such Cases Averment shall be received to the contrary, and the Writ be quashed.	The whole act.
11 Hen. 6. c. 3	Real Actions	Recital of the Statute 4 H. 4. c. 7.; Disseisees may recover in all Writs founded on Novel disseisin, as in Assises under recited Act.	The whole act.
11 Hen. 6. c. 4	Attaints	Perjury of Jurors, and Pleas and Delays at the Common Law, in Attaints against them; Plaintiffs in such Attaints shall recover Damages and Costs.	The whole act.
11 Hen. 6. c. 5	Real Actions	After any Assignment by Tenant for Life or Years, the Reversioner may have Action of Waste against him, as before any such Assignment, if he continue to take the Profits.	The whole act.
11 Hen. 6. c. 7	Sheriff of Herefordshire	Recital of the Statute 9 H. 6. c. 7. restraining Extortions of the Sheriff of County of Hereford. The said Statute 9 H. 6. c. 7., continued for Three Years.	The whole act.
11 Hen. 6. c. 8	Weights and Measures Act 1433	Recital of St. 1 H. 5. c. 10. as to the Measure of Corn; The several Statutes not duly executed; The Statute 1 H. 5. c. 10. 8 H. 6. c. 5., &c. touching Weights and Measures shall be proclaimed and executed; A common Bushel shall be in every Town, under Penalty in St. 8 H. 6. c. 5. as to Balances and Weights. Justices of Peace may determine Offences against these Statutes. Form of the Proceeding. Mayors, &c. shall be sworn to execute the Statute; and account for the Forfeitures, &c. to the King. Saving of Liberties of Lords, &c.	The whole act.
11 Hen. 6. c. 9	Cloths	Recital of the Statutes 17 H. 2. c. 2., 7 H. 4. c. 10., 11 H. 4. c . 6., respecting the Alnage and Measure of cloths . The said Statutes declared to extend only to whole cloths. Length and Breadth of Cloths called Streits. Cloths shall not be put to sale until measured and sealed by the Alneger. Penalty on him for sealing defective cloths.	The whole act.
11 Hen. 6. c. 10	Staple	Whenever Recognisors in Statutes Staple, arrested in Execution, sue out Writs of Corpus cum causâ or Scire facias, Surety shall be given severally to the King and to the Recognisee.	The whole act.
11 Hen. 6. c. 12	Wax Chandlers	Exactions of Wax Chandlers. They shall take for Wax Candles, Images, &c. only 3d. in the pound beyond the price of plain wax on penalty of forfeiture, &c. Justices of Peace, &c. may punish offenders. Exception.	The whole act.
11 Hen. 6. c. 15	Customs	Customers shall give Warrants of Discharge to Merchants having paid their Custom. Penalty on Refusal.	The whole act.
11 Hen. 6. c. 16	Customs	Penalty on Customers giving, and Merchants receiving, blank Cockets to defraud the King of his Custom, &c.	The whole act.
14 Hen. 6. c. 4	Middlesex Sessions	The Statutes as to holding Sessions in Counties Four Times a Year; In Middlesex the Sessions need only be holden Twice a Year; or for Inquiry of former Entries, &c.	The whole act.
14 Hen. 6. c. 8	Safe Conducts Act 1435	Recital of the Statute 2 Hen. 5. st. 1. ch. 6, concerning Breakers of Truces, &c. The said Statute repeated for Seven Years.	The whole act.
15 Hen. 6. c. 1	Marshalsea Act 1436		The whole act.
15 Hen. 6. c. 2	Exportation of Corn		The whole act.
15 Hen. 6. c. 3	Safe Conducts Act 1436		The whole act.
15 Hen. 6. c. 4	Sub-poenas		The whole act.
15 Hen. 6. c. 5	Attaints		The whole act.
15 Hen. 6. c. 6	Guilds and Fraternities Act 1436		The whole act.
15 Hen. 6. c. 7	Attorneys		The whole act.
15 Hen. 6. c. 8	No merchant shall ship any merchandises of the staple, but as wharfs assigned, &c.		The whole act.
18 Hen. 6. c. 2	Attaints	Recital of the Statute 15 H. 6. c. 5. relative to Qualification of Jurors in Attaints; Freeholders in Gavelkind may be Jurors.	The whole act.
18 Hen. 6. c. 5	Taxation	Qualification of Collectors of Tenths in Cities, to be also Collectors of Fifteenths in Counties, Five Pounds per Annum, within the County.	The whole act.
18 Hen. 6. c. 8	Captures at Sea	For the further Security of the Captors of the Ships of Enemies, Alien Merchants may hide Ships of Enemies being under the King's Letters of Safe-conduct. Departures of Ships, not having Safe Conducts on board if Enrolled in Chancery, declared valid. Commencement and Proclamation of this act.	The whole act.
18 Hen. 6. c. 9	Appearance of Plaintiffs	Recital of Statute 10 H. 6. c. 4. for recording the personal appearance of Plaintiffs . The said statute made perpetual. Penalty on Officers of Court for neglect; on Attornies for not recording their warrants in the town where the exigent is awarded.	The whole act.
18 Hen. 6. c. 10	Commissions of Sewers	Recital of St. 6 H. 6. c. 5. as to Commissioners of Sewers. Commissions of Sewers shall be granted for Ten Years.	The whole act.
18 Hen. 6. c. 11	Justices of the Peace	Abuse in the Appointment of Justices of the Peace. None shall be assigned a Justice of Peace unless he have 20l. per Annum in Land. Twenty 20l. so qualified Persons acting. Exception as to Corporations Lawyers, in Want of qualified Persons in Counties.	The whole act.
18 Hen. 6. c. 12	Indictments, etc.	Recital of St. 9 H. 5. stat . 1. c. 1. touching false Appeals and Indictments and Doubts whether it be expired. The recited statute declared in force and made perpetual.	The whole act.
18 Hen. 6. c. 13	Outlawries Act 1439	Recital of St. 9 Hen. 5. stat. 1. ch. 2. as to Forfeitures upon Outlawries in Lancashire. The recited Statute made perpetual unless repealed in the next Parliament.	The whole act.
18 Hen. 6. c. 14	Sheriffs	Sheriffs, &c. taking Bribes for making Arrays and Panels of Juries, shall forfeit Ten Times the Amount, to the Party grieved. Continuance of this act.	The whole act.
18 Hen. 6. c. 16	Cloth Measures Act 1439	Evil of measuring Cloths by the London Measure. Keepers of the Aulnage shall have a Line for measuring of Cloths sealed at the Exchequer. Measure of Cloth and buyer refusing this Ordinance.	The whole act.
18 Hen. 6. c. 19	Soldiers	Evils of Desertion in the King's Service. A soldier leaving his Captain without Licence, declared guilty of Felony. No Soldier so returning and detained them for Inquiry by Justices of Peace.	The whole act.
20 Hen. 6. c. 1	Safe Conducts Act 1442	Except Chapter Nine.—Recital of Magna Carta relating to Trial by Peers; Noble Ladies shall be tried as Peers of the Realm are tried.	The whole act.
20 Hen. 6. c. 2	Outlawries Act 1442	Except Chapter Nine.—Recital of Magna Carta relating to Trial by Peers; Noble Ladies shall be tried as Peers of the Realm are tried.	The whole act.
20 Hen. 6. c. 3	Treason Act 1442	Except Chapter Nine.—Recital of Magna Carta relating to Trial by Peers; Noble Ladies shall be tried as Peers of the Realm are tried.	The whole act.
20 Hen. 6. c. 4	What duties they shall pay to the King which carry wools to any other place than to the staples.	Except Chapter Nine.—Recital of Magna Carta relating to Trial by Peers; Noble Ladies shall be tried as Peers of the Realm are tried.	The whole act.
20 Hen. 6. c. 5	No customer, &c. shall have a ship of his own, use merchandise, keep a wharf or inn, or be a factor.	Except Chapter Nine.—Recital of Magna Carta relating to Trial by Peers; Noble Ladies shall be tried as Peers of the Realm are tried.	The whole act.
20 Hen. 6. c. 6	A confirmation for ten years of the statute of 15 Hen. VI. cap. 2. touching the transportation of corn being of certain prices.	Except Chapter Nine.—Recital of Magna Carta relating to Trial by Peers; Noble Ladies shall be tried as Peers of the Realm are tried.	The whole act.
20 Hen. 6. c. 7	If any carry merchandises into Wales, and after bring them into England not customed, he shall forfeit them.	Except Chapter Nine.—Recital of Magna Carta relating to Trial by Peers; Noble Ladies shall be tried as Peers of the Realm are tried.	The whole act.
20 Hen. 6. c. 8	In what case the King's purveyors that would take cattle, may be resisted.	Except Chapter Nine.—Recital of Magna Carta relating to Trial by Peers; Noble Ladies shall be tried as Peers of the Realm are tried.	The whole act.
20 Hen. 6. c. 10	Four wardens of the worsted weavers of Norwich appointed yearly to inspect and regulate the worsted of that city, and two in Norfolk. The length and breadth of all sorts of worsteds made in Norwich and Norfolk assigned	Except Chapter Nine.—Recital of Magna Carta relating to Trial by Peers; Noble Ladies shall be tried as Peers of the Realm are tried.	The whole act.
20 Hen. 6. c. 11	A repeal of so much of the statute of 2 Hen. V. stat. 1. cap. 6. as maketh the breaking of truce and safe conducts high treason.	Except Chapter Nine.—Recital of Magna Carta relating to Trial by Peers; Noble Ladies shall be tried as Peers of the Realm are tried.	The whole act.
20 Hen. 6. c. 12	A reformation of the partition money arising by the sale of wools and woolfels by the mayor and constable of Calais, ordered for seven years.	Except Chapter Nine.—Recital of Magna Carta relating to Trial by Peers; Noble Ladies shall be tried as Peers of the Realm are tried.	The whole act.
23 Hen. 6. c. 1	Purveyance	Recital of St. 36 Ed. 3. stat. 1. ch. 2. relating to Purveyors. 36 Ed. 3. stat. 1. ch. 3. Recited Statutes confirmed. Purveyors shall be sworn. Resistance against Purveyors acting illegally. Action of Debt by the party grieved. Treble Damages. Serjeant of the Catery shall pay Damages in Default of Purveyor.	The whole act.
23 Hen. 6. c. 3	Worsteds	Recital of the Statute 20 Hen. 6. c. 10. touching Deceits in the making of Worsteds in Norwich and Norfolk. Worsted Weavers shall choose Four Wardens yearly in Norwich, and Four in Norfolk. Oath of the Wardens; and their Authority. Weavers shall put their Marks on their Worsteds. Defective Worsteds forfeited. Continuance of this act. Rules of Wardens shall be certified to the King and Council.	The whole act.
23 Hen. 6. c. 5	Exportation	The Statute 15 Hen. 6. c. 2. as to Export of Corn, recited. The said recited Statute made perpetual.	The whole act.
23 Hen. 6. c. 6	Sheriffs of Northumberland	The gathering of Head-pence by the Sheriff of Northumberland shall cease.	The whole act.
23 Hen. 6. c. 8	Commissions of Sewers	Recital of the Statute 6 Hen. 6. c. 5. relating to Commissions of Sewers. Like Commissions may be granted for 15 Years.	The whole act.
23 Hen. 6. c. 9	Sheriffs and Bailiffs, Fees, etc. Act 1444	No Sheriff shall let his county, &c. to farm. No Sheriff's Officers or Bailiffs shall be returned upon inquests. Such Officers shall not have anything of persons arrested for ease and favor, &c. Treason arrests. No fee for Returns or Panels. Fees for Copy of a Panel. Sheriffs shall let to Bail all persons arrested on Sureties, except persons in execution, &c. How their Bond shall be broken on such bailing. No condition thereof. Bonds in other forms void. Sheriff shall make Deputies in the King's Courts. Penalty on offending against this act. Justices of Assize may inquire of offenders. Sheriffs returning Cessi Corpus or Reddidit se shall be chargeable with the Bodies. Exception for the Warders of the Fleet, &c.	The whole act. (Note: This act was not included in the Statute Law Revision Act 1863 (26 & 27 Vict. c. 125). This act was repealed for England and Wales by the Sheriffs Act 1887 (50 & 51 Vict. c. 55).)
23 Hen. 6. c. 10	Wages of Knights of the Shire Act 1444	Extortion of Sheriffs in levying Wages of Knights of the Shire; Appointment of County Court to assess such Wages. Penalty on Sheriff, &c. for Absence. Each Hundred and Quarter shall be assessed by itself. Penalty on levying more than is assessed. Sheriffs shall levy the Money, and pay it to the Knights. Recovery of Penalties. Treble Costs. Such Wages shall be levied only where usual.	The whole act.
23 Hen. 6. c. 11	Foreign Please	Trial of Foreign Pleas after Issue joined, &c. Continuance of this act.	The whole act.
23 Hen. 6. c. 12	Labourers	Servants in Husbandry purposing to leave their Masters must engage with a new one, and give warning to the old; or continue to serve the First Master. Wages of Servants in Husbandry. Hiring by Week. Meat and Drink, and Wages of Servants of Hostlers, &c. in Cities. Punishment of Masters, Carpenters, and other Artificers. Winter Wages. Wages of Labourers in Har vest. Holy-days. Justices of Peace shall enforce this act. Penalty on Servants, &c. offending. Action against Offenders. No Fine shall be under 38. 4d. Proclamation of the Acts relating to Servants, &c. Evasion of Service in Husbandry. Act.	The whole act.
23 Hen. 6. c. 13	Purveyance	Penalty on Buyers or Purveyors of Subjects taking any Thing against the Owner's Will. Penalty on Officers not executing this act. On Buyers. Commencement of Act. King's Purveyors.	The whole act.
23 Hen. 6. c. 14	Parliamentary Elections Act 1444	Recital of Stat. 1 H. 5. c. 1. and of Stat. 8 H. 6. c. 7. Defaults of Sheriffs on returning Knights to Parliament. The recited Statutes 1 H. 5. c. 1 . and 8 H. 6. c. 7. confirmed. The Sheriffs shall send precepts to the Mayors, &c. of Cities and Boroughs to elect Citizens and Burgesses to Parliament. Mayors, &c. shall return the said precepts ( to the Sheriffs, who shall make rightful returns accordingly. Sheriffs transgressing this or any former statute touching elections shall in addition to the penalty to the King under the Statute 8 H. 6. c. 7. forfeit 100l. to the party, &c. Penalty on Mayor or Bailiff making undue Return of Citizens or Burgesses, 401. to the King and 401. to the party, &c. Time of election of Knights of the Shire. Penalty on Sheriffs, 1007. to the King and 1007. to the party, &c. Recovery of Penalties. If any who is returned to be Knight, Citizen, or Burgess be put out and another put in his place, Penalty against the person taking his seat, 100l. to the King and 1007. to the party, &c. What persons shall be chosen Knights of the shire.	The whole act.
23 Hen. 6. c. 17	Wines	Subjects may buy Wines in Gascony, &c. without any new Charges. Penalty on King's Officers transgressing this act.	The whole act.
25 Hen. 6. c. 11	Wales	All Statutes against Welshmen confirmed. Grants of Markets, &c. in North Wales avoided. The King's Bondsmen there shall do their annual services.	The whole act.
27 Hen. 6. c. 1	Importation	De Anno xxvijo. Of the Twenty-seventh Year. — Except Chapter Five. —The Scandal of holding Fairs and Markets on Sundays and upon High Feast Days. Fairs and Markets shall not be holden Sundays or on Festivals. Exception of the Four Sundays in Harvest. Grantees of Fairs and Markets shall have their full Complement of Days, excluding Sundays and the said Feast Days. Commencement and Continuance of this act.	The whole act.
27 Hen. 6. c. 2	Exportation	De Anno xxvijo. Of the Twenty-seventh Year. — Except Chapter Five. —The Scandal of holding Fairs and Markets on Sundays and upon High Feast Days. Fairs and Markets shall not be holden Sundays or on Festivals. Exception of the Four Sundays in Harvest. Grantees of Fairs and Markets shall have their full Complement of Days, excluding Sundays and the said Feast Days. Commencement and Continuance of this act.	The whole act.
27 Hen. 6. c. 3	Exportation (No. 2)	De Anno xxvijo. Of the Twenty-seventh Year. — Except Chapter Five. —The Scandal of holding Fairs and Markets on Sundays and upon High Feast Days. Fairs and Markets shall not be holden Sundays or on Festivals. Exception of the Four Sundays in Harvest. Grantees of Fairs and Markets shall have their full Complement of Days, excluding Sundays and the said Feast Days. Commencement and Continuance of this act.	The whole act.
27 Hen. 6. c. 4	Treason Act 1448	De Anno xxvijo. Of the Twenty-seventh Year. — Except Chapter Five. —The Scandal of holding Fairs and Markets on Sundays and upon High Feast Days. Fairs and Markets shall not be holden Sundays or on Festivals. Exception of the Four Sundays in Harvest. Grantees of Fairs and Markets shall have their full Complement of Days, excluding Sundays and the said Feast Days. Commencement and Continuance of this act.	The whole act.
27 Hen. 6. c. 6	The King's pardon granted to all priests, as well secular as religious, of several offences, forfeitures, &c.	De Anno xxvijo. Of the Twenty-seventh Year. — Except Chapter Five. —The Scandal of holding Fairs and Markets on Sundays and upon High Feast Days. Fairs and Markets shall not be holden Sundays or on Festivals. Exception of the Four Sundays in Harvest. Grantees of Fairs and Markets shall have their full Complement of Days, excluding Sundays and the said Feast Days. Commencement and Continuance of this act.	The whole act.
28 Hen. 6. c. 1	Importation	De Anno xxviijo. Of the Twenty-eighth Year.	The whole act.
28 Hen. 6. c. 2	Purveyance	De Anno xxviijo. Of the Twenty-eighth Year.	The whole act.
28 Hen. 6. c. 3	Pardon	De Anno xxviijo. Of the Twenty-eighth Year.	The whole act.
28 Hen. 6. c. 4	Distress	De Anno xxviijo. Of the Twenty-eighth Year.	The whole act.
28 Hen. 6. c. 5	Customs	De Anno xxviijo. Of the Twenty-eighth Year.	The whole act.
29 Hen. 6. c. 2	Safe Conducts Act 1450	St. 2 Hen. V. st. 1. chap. 6. as to Safe-Conducts, confirmed. Chancellor and Chief Justice shall have like Jurisdiction as have the Conservators under the said Statute; Process against Offenders. No person appearing shall incur the Pain of Treason. Saving for Persons out of the Realm. Proviso for Owners of Ships, &c. Continuance of this act. No pardon allowable.	The whole act.
31 Hen. 6. c. 1	Attainder of John Cade Act 1452	D' Anno xxxjo. Of the thirty-first year.	The whole act.
31 Hen. 6. c. 2	Writs	D' Anno xxxjo. Of the thirty-first year.	The whole act.
31 Hen. 6. c. 3	Attachments	D' Anno xxxjo. Of the thirty-first year.	The whole act.
31 Hen. 6. c. 4	Safe Conducts Act 1452	D' Anno xxxjo. Of the thirty-first year.	The whole act.
31 Hen. 6. c. 5	No customer, comptroller, &c. shall have any estate certain in his office.	D' Anno xxxjo. Of the thirty-first year.	The whole act.
31 Hen. 6. c. 6	Outlawries Act 1452	D' Anno xxxjo. Of the thirty-first year.	The whole act.
31 Hen. 6. c. 7	Fees, wages, and rewards due to the King's officers, shall not be comprised within the statute of resumption made in the eighth and twentieth year of the King's reign.	D' Anno xxxjo. Of the thirty-first year.	The whole act.
31 Hen. 6. c. 8	A confirmation of a subsidy of wool, woolfels, and cloth transported, granted by a statute ordained 31 Hen. VI. not printed.	D' Anno xxxjo. Of the thirty-first year.	The whole act.
31 Hen. 6. c. 9	A remedy for a women inforced to be bound by statute or obligation.	D' Anno xxxjo. Of the thirty-first year.	The whole act.
33 Hen. 6. c. 1	Embezzlement	D' Anno xxxiijo. Of the thirty-third year.	The whole act.
33 Hen. 6. c. 2	Repeal of 31 Hen. 6. c. 6, jurors	D' Anno xxxiijo. Of the thirty-third year.	The whole act.
33 Hen. 6. c. 3	Exchequer	D' Anno xxxiijo. Of the thirty-third year.	The whole act.
33 Hen. 6. c. 4	Brewing	D' Anno xxxiijo. Of the thirty-third year.	The whole act.
33 Hen. 6. c. 5	Importation Act 1455	D' Anno xxxiijo. Of the thirty-third year.	The whole act.
33 Hen. 6. c. 6	Fountain Abbey	D' Anno xxxiijo. Of the thirty-third year.	The whole act.
33 Hen. 6. c. 7	Attorneys	D' Anno xxxiijo. Of the thirty-third year.	The whole act.
39 Hen. 6. c. 1	Repeal of 38 Hen. 6	D' Anno xxxix. Of the thirty-ninth year.	The whole act.
39 Hen. 6. c. 2	Livery of Women	D' Anno xxxix. Of the thirty-ninth year.	The whole act.
1 Edw. 4. c. 1	Statutes of Hen. 4, Hen. 5, and Hen. 6 Act 1641	What Acts judicial, &c. done in Times of the Kings Henry 4., 5., and 6. shall be valid. Fines, &c.; other than in Parliament. § 2 Creations of Nobility; Except to Rebels. § 3 Liberties, Divisions of Counties, Grants of Incorporation, &c. to any Bodies Corporate. § 4 Licences or Pardons of Alienation, or to enter into Lands descended, without Livery. Licences to found any Spiritual House, &c. or any Fraternity, Guild, &c., or to give or receive any Lands. Licences of Appropriation, or to make Elections. Pardons to Corporations, for Purchases; Liveries or Restitutions of Temporalities to Spiritual Persons. Founding of Religious Houses; as to the Corporations and Seites of the same. § 5 Assurance of Dower. Proviso for the King and the Duchess of Bedford. § 6 Lands assured in Mortmain, by any of the said Kings, which were given to them to that Intent. Exception for Lands assured to the King by way of Recompence. § 7 Collations, Gifts, and Presentations, to Benefices, during the Incumbents' Lives. Except Persons attainted; and the King's open Enemies. § 8 Grants of Wards and Marriages. § 9 Grants of Fairs and Markets. § 10 Grants of Liveries of Lands. Exception as to Crown Lands; and forfeited Estates. § 11 Wards or Marriages, granted by the present King. Except on Attainders. § 12 Letters Patents made to several Persons of Offices. Proviso for Grants of Annuities, Benefices, and ancient Offices. Exception for certain Offices; the Grants of which shall be in force until the Feast of All Saints. § 13 The King's several Grants to divers Corporations, since the Fourth of March last. § 14 Feoffments upon Trust by the late Kings, to the Use of others; except Persons attainted in this Parliament. § 15 K. Edw. 4's Letters Patents made to the Lord Chancellor, Lord Treasurer, Judges, &c. § 16 Commissions of the Peace, and of Gaol-delivery, &c. or of Sewers, and all other Commissions. § 17 Acts of Parliament for the Town of Shrewsbury. § 18 Grant to the Abbot of Byland, of the Manor of Kilbourn in the County of York, by K. Hen. 6. § 19 Grants to Convents to choose their Abbots, &c. § 20 Recognizances and Deeds inrolled. § 21 Licenses to inclose Parks, &c. or to make Castles &c. § 22 Proviso for Cicily, Duchess of York, Mother to the King. § 23 Proviso for Lands forfeited by Attainder in this Parliament § 24 Persons so attainted, excepted from this act.	The whole act.
3 Edw. 4. c. 1	Exportation Act 1463	Ao iijo. In the Third Year.	The whole act.
3 Edw. 4. c. 2	Importation Act 1463	Ao iijo. In the Third Year.	The whole act.
3 Edw. 4. c. 3	Importation of Silk Act 1463	Ao iijo. In the Third Year.	The whole act.
3 Edw. 4. c. 4	Importation (No. 2) Act 1463	Ao iijo. In the Third Year.	The whole act. (Note: The act was already repealed by Importation (No. 4) Act 1816 (56 Geo. 4. c. 36))
3 Edw. 4. c. 5	Apparel Act 1463	Ao iijo. In the Third Year.	The whole act.
4 Edw. 4. c. 1	Cloths Act 1464	Ao iiiijo. In the Fourth Year.	The whole act.
4 Edw. 4. c. 2	Export of Wool Act 1464	Ao iiiijo. In the Fourth Year.	The whole act.
4 Edw. 4. c. 3	Exportation (Newcastle) Act 1464	Ao iiiijo. In the Fourth Year.	The whole act.
4 Edw. 4. c. 4	Contracting for Wool Act 1464	Ao iiiijo. In the Fourth Year.	The whole act.
4 Edw. 4. c. 5	Importation Act 1464	Ao iiiijo. In the Fourth Year.	The whole act.
4 Edw. 4. c. 6	Foreign Merchants Act 1464	Ao iiiijo. In the Fourth Year.	The whole act.
4 Edw. 4. c. 7	Shoemakers Act 1464	Ao iiiijo. In the Fourth Year.	The whole act.
4 Edw. 4. c. 8	Horn Act 1464	Ao iiiijo. In the Fourth Year.	The whole act.
4 Edw. 4. c. 9	Pattens Act 1464	Ao iiiijo. In the Fourth Year.	The whole act.
4 Edw. 4. c. 10	Passage at Dover Act 1464	Ao iiiijo. In the Fourth Year.	The whole act.
7 Edw. 4. c. 1	Worsted Act 1467	Ao vijo. In the Seventh Year.	The whole act.
7 Edw. 4. c. 2	Cloths (Devon) Act 1467	Ao vijo. In the Seventh Year.	The whole act.
7 Edw. 4. c. 3	Export of Cloths Act 1467	Ao vijo. In the Seventh Year.	The whole act.
7 Edw. 4. c. 4	Crown Grants Act 1467	Ao vijo. In the Seventh Year.	The whole act.
7 Edw. 4. c. 5	Forfeited Estates Act 1467	Ao vijo. In the Seventh Year.	The whole act.
8 Edw. 4. c. 1	Cloths Act 1468	Ao viijo. In the Eighth Year.	The whole act.
8 Edw. 4. c. 2	Liveries Act 1468	Ao viijo. In the Eighth Year.	The whole act.
8 Edw. 4. c. 3	Juries Act 1468	Ao viijo. In the Eighth Year.	The whole act.
8 Edw. 4. c. 4	Sheriffs Act 1468	Ao viijo. In the Eighth Year.	The whole act.
12 Edw. 4. c. 2	Bowstaves Act 1472	Incipiunt Statuta apud Westm' edita, anno duo-decimo. Here begin the Statutes made at Westminster, in the Twelfth Year. — Except Chapter One. — Recital of the Statute 23 Hen. VI. c. 7. Sheriffs, before having their Writ of Discharge, may return Writs, during Michaelmas Term..	The whole act.
12 Edw. 4. c. 3	Subsidies Act 1472	Incipiunt Statuta apud Westm' edita, anno duo-decimo. Here begin the Statutes made at Westminster, in the Twelfth Year. — Except Chapter One. — Recital of the Statute 23 Hen. VI. c. 7. Sheriffs, before having their Writ of Discharge, may return Writs, during Michaelmas Term..	The whole act.
12 Edw. 4. c. 4	Liveries Act 1472	Incipiunt Statuta apud Westm' edita, anno duo-decimo. Here begin the Statutes made at Westminster, in the Twelfth Year. — Except Chapter One. — Recital of the Statute 23 Hen. VI. c. 7. Sheriffs, before having their Writ of Discharge, may return Writs, during Michaelmas Term..	The whole act.
12 Edw. 4. c. 5	Wool Act 1472	Incipiunt Statuta apud Westm' edita, anno duo-decimo. Here begin the Statutes made at Westminster, in the Twelfth Year. — Except Chapter One. — Recital of the Statute 23 Hen. VI. c. 7. Sheriffs, before having their Writ of Discharge, may return Writs, during Michaelmas Term..	The whole act.
12 Edw. 4. c. 6	Commissions of Sewers Act 1472	Incipiunt Statuta apud Westm' edita, anno duo-decimo. Here begin the Statutes made at Westminster, in the Twelfth Year. — Except Chapter One. — Recital of the Statute 23 Hen. VI. c. 7. Sheriffs, before having their Writ of Discharge, may return Writs, during Michaelmas Term..	The whole act.
12 Edw. 4. c. 7	Weirs Act 1472	Incipiunt Statuta apud Westm' edita, anno duo-decimo. Here begin the Statutes made at Westminster, in the Twelfth Year. — Except Chapter One. — Recital of the Statute 23 Hen. VI. c. 7. Sheriffs, before having their Writ of Discharge, may return Writs, during Michaelmas Term..	The whole act.
12 Edw. 4. c. 8	Surveying of Victual Act 1472	Incipiunt Statuta apud Westm' edita, anno duo-decimo. Here begin the Statutes made at Westminster, in the Twelfth Year. — Except Chapter One. — Recital of the Statute 23 Hen. VI. c. 7. Sheriffs, before having their Writ of Discharge, may return Writs, during Michaelmas Term..	The whole act.
12 Edw. 4. c. 9	Escheat Act 1472	Incipiunt Statuta apud Westm' edita, anno duo-decimo. Here begin the Statutes made at Westminster, in the Twelfth Year. — Except Chapter One. — Recital of the Statute 23 Hen. VI. c. 7. Sheriffs, before having their Writ of Discharge, may return Writs, during Michaelmas Term..	The whole act.
14 Edw. 4. c. 1	King's Tenants Act 1474	Incipiunt Statuta apud Westm' edita anno quarto-decimo. Here begin the Statutes made at Westminster, in the Fourteenth Year.	The whole act.
14 Edw. 4. c. 2	Protections Act 1474	Incipiunt Statuta apud Westm' edita anno quarto-decimo. Here begin the Statutes made at Westminster, in the Fourteenth Year.	The whole act.
14 Edw. 4. c. 3	Wool Act 1474	Incipiunt Statuta apud Westm' edita anno quarto-decimo. Here begin the Statutes made at Westminster, in the Fourteenth Year.	The whole act.
14 Edw. 4. c. 4	Safe Conducts Act 1474	Incipiunt Statuta apud Westm' edita anno quarto-decimo. Here begin the Statutes made at Westminster, in the Fourteenth Year.	The whole act.
17 Edw. 4. c. 1	Currency, etc. Act 1477	Recital of St. 9 Ed. 3. st. 2. c . 2.; 2 H. 4. c. 6. No Irish Money shall run in Payment in England or Wales, upon Pain of Forfeiture thereof. Apportionment of Forfeitures. Action of Debt for Forfeitures; at common Law, or before Justices of the Peace. Process, Judgement, and Execution in Actions for Penalties. Recital of St. 2 H. 6. c. 6. Felony to export Coin or Plate, &c. without the King's Licence. Except by Persons dispensed in St. 2 H. 6. and other Statutes Recital of St. 9 E. 4. st . 2. c. 3; 17 R. 2. c. 1. No Person shall melt any Money of Gold or Silver sufficient to run in Payment; nor gild any Vessels, &c. of Silver. Exceptions. 3 E. 4. c. 5; Rot. Parl. 17 E. 4. nu.30. Forfeiture of Value of the Money, &c. Apportionment of the Forfeitures. Forfeitures recoverable as those in respect of Irish Money. Recital of St. 2 Hen. 4. chapter 17. Gold and Silver wrought and sold shall be of a certain Fineness. Things wrought of Silver shall be marked with the Leopard's Head, and the Workmen's Mark, within London, and Two Miles thereof. Penalty on the Keeper of the Touch. Apportionment of Forfeitures; Recovery thereof, as of those in respect of Irish Money, under this act. Aliens being Goldsmiths shall be liable to Search by Wardens of Goldsmiths; Aliens shall inhabit in the open Streets. Goldsmiths' Company shall be responsible for the Warden of the Touch. Recital of St. 5 H. 4. chapter 9. All Alien Merchants shall employ their Money in this Realm, and prove the doing so. Penalty; Forfeiture of Goods, and Imprisonment. Apportionment and Recovery of Forfeitures. Forfeitures incurred before Easter may be recovered before Justices of the Peace. Provisoes as to exporting Gold and Silver, by Ambassadors, &c. Proclamation of this act. Provisoes as to Forfeitures within Franchises. Provisoes for certain Liberties and Franchises.	The whole act.
17 Edw. 4. c. 3	Unlawful Games Act 1477	The Mischief of certain unlawful Games. Whosoever shall allow any of the said Games in his House, or other Place, shall be Three Years imprisoned, and forfeit 201. Apportionment of Penalties. Whosoever shall play at such Games shall be imprisoned Two Years, and forfeit 107. Apportionment of Penalties.	The whole act.
17 Edw. 4. c. 5	Cloths Act 1477	Recital of St. 4 Edw. 4. chapter 1. Woolen Cloths, Half-Cloths, &c. shall be sealed with Wax at both Ends, instead of one Seal of Lead. Subsidy and Aulnage of Cloths may be let to ferm upon good Surety.	The whole act.
17 Edw. 4. c. 6	Repeal of Acts, etc. Act 1477	Repeal of a Parliament holden 9 [vel 10] Edw. 4. [49 Hen. 6.] and of all the Acts therein made, and of all Exemplifications thereof.	The whole act.
22 Edw. 4. c. 1	Apparel Act 1482	Former Statutes respecting Apparel. What Kind of Apparel Temporal Men of every Degree and Estate are allowed, and what prohibited, to wear. Justices of Peace shall have Power to hear and determine Offences. The King shall have all Forfeitures, except in the County Palatine of Chester, in Exhamshire, and in the Bishoprick of Durham. This act shall not extend to Women, except the Wives of Servants and Labourers. Former Acts repealed. The Length of Gowns and Mantles. Proviso in favour of particular Persons.	The whole act.
22 Edw. 4. c. 2	Fish Act 1482	The Contents of Vessels of Salmon, Herrings, and Eels: and how Fish shall be packed. Packing of Salmons, Packing of small Fish called Grills. The Contents a Barrel of Herring, &c. which shall be well and fairly packed. The Contents of a Barrel of Eels, and they shall not be mingled. Packing of barrelled Fish; Chid Officers of Cities and Boroughs, empowered to appoint Searchers to search and gauge Vessels of Fish. Application of Penalties. Saving for Forfeitures in Franchises.	The whole act.
22 Edw. 4. c. 4	Price of Bows Act 1482	Benefits of Archery. Price of Long Bows shall not exceed 3s. 4d. Penalty, 20s. Application of Penalties.	The whole act.
22 Edw. 4. c. 5	Fulling Mills Act 1482	Evil of using Fulling Mills in the making Caps, &c. None shall full any caps, &c. at any Mill or expose the same to sale. Penalty 40 shillings and forfeiture of the articles. Application of the Penalties . (Note: This act was not included in the Statute Law Revision Act 1863 (26 & 27 Vict. c. 125). This act was repealed for England and Wales by the Continuance, etc. of Laws Act 1603 (1 Jas. 1. c. 25).)	The whole act.
22 Edw. 4. c. 6	Swans Act 1482	Swans in the hands of Yeomen and husbandmen . No one but a lord's son shall possess marks or gannes of swans unless he have freehold lands of the yearly value of five marks. Any person so qualified may seize the swans so forfeited.	The whole act.
22 Edw. 4. c. 8	Berwick Act 1482	For Benefit of the Town of Berwick, Merchandises brought out of Scotland or the Isles, shall be first brought to Berwick; or to Carlisle. English Merchandises shall ne be carried into Scotland; English Goods shall not be sold to the Scots except at Berwick or Carlisle. Port of Berwick. Salted Salmon. Penalty. Recovery Application of Penalties. Merchants and Freemen Berwick shall have to ferm the Waters Royal, and Fishings there. Confirmation of all the Liberties, &c. of Berwick. Saving for the Bishop of Durham:— From the beginning to "Carlisle aforesaid."	The whole act.
1 Ric. 3. c. 1	Feoffments to Uses Act 1483	An Act agaynst pryvy and unknowen Feoffements.	The whole act.
1 Ric. 3. c. 2	Benevolences Act 1483	An Act to free the Subjects from Benevolences.	The whole act.
1 Ric. 3. c. 5	Feoffee to Uses Act 1483	An Act touching Feoffmts made to the Kings use of others.	The whole act.
1 Ric. 3. c. 7	Fines Act 1483	An Act for proclamacons uppon Fynes levyed.	The whole act.
1 Ric. 3. c. 14	Collector of Dismes Act 1483	An Act for Dysmes graunted in the pvinces of Canterbury and Yorke.	The whole act.
1 Hen. 7. c. 1	Real Actions Act 1485	An Act that the Demaundant in a forme downe shall have his accon agaynst the pnor of the pffytte.	The whole act.
1 Hen. 7. c. 4	Clergy Act 1485	An Acte for Busshopps to punysh Priests and other religious men for dishonest lyffe.	The whole act. (Note: This act was not included in the Statute Law Revision Act 1863 (26 & 27 Vict. c. 125). This act was repealed for England and Wales by the Church Discipline Act 1840 (3 & 4 Vict. c. 86).)
1 Hen. 7. c. 5	Tanners Act 1485	Tanners.	The whole act.
1 Hen. 7. c. 6	Pardon Act 1485	An Acte that certayne psons wthin Sanctuary shall not have any accions brought agaynst them.	The whole act.
1 Hen. 7. c. 10	Aliens Act 1485	P mcatoribus Italie.	The whole act.
3 Hen. 7. c. 1	Star Chamber Act 1487	P Cama Stellat. An Acte geving the Court of Starchamber Authority to punysh dyvers Mydemeanors.	The whole act.
3 Hen. 7. c. 2	Recognizances Act 1487	An Acte agaynst Murderers.	From "And that yf eny man be slayne" to "execucion of the same."
3 Hen. 7. c. 4	Fraudulent Deeds of Gift Act 1487	An Acte agaynst fraudulent deeds of gyft.	The whole act.
3 Hen. 7. c. 5	Usury Act 1487	An Acte agaynst Usury and unlawfull bargaynes.	The whole act. (Note: This act was not included in the Statute Law Revision Act 1863 (26 & 27 Vict. c. 125). This act was repealed for England and Wales by the Usury Act 1495 (11 Hen. 7. c. 8).)
3 Hen. 7. c. 6	Usury (No. 2) Act 1487	An Acte agaynst Exchange and Rechaunge without the Kings Lycence.	The whole act.
3 Hen. 7. c. 7	Customs Act 1487	An Acte agaynst Marchants carrying of goods from one Port to an other without a certificat from the Customer where the goods were fyrst entred.	The whole act.
3 Hen. 7. c. 9	Citizens of London Act 1487	An Acte that the Cytizens of London maye carry all manner of Wares to forrayne Marketts.	The whole act.
3 Hen. 7. c. 12	King's Officers and Tenants Act 1487	An Acte agaynst retayneing any of the Kyng's Tenants.	The whole act.
3 Hen. 7. c. 13	Price of Long Bows Act 1487	An Acte agaynst the excessyve price of Longe bowes.	The whole act.
3 Hen. 7. c. 16	Feoffees in Trust Act 1487	An Act to enable Feoffes in trust to sue for the benefytt of ye feffors although they be outlawed.	The whole act.
4 Hen. 7. c. 1	Commissions of Sewers Act 1488	An Act for the graunting forth of Comyssions for Sewers.	The whole act.
4 Hen. 7. c. 4	Protections Act 1488	An Acte that all Psons serving the Kynge beyound the Sea in Bryttayne may have their pteccon of psotur & moratur.	The whole act.
4 Hen. 7. c. 5	Dismes Act 1488	An Act to make voide fres patents made to Abbotts Pryors & others for gathering and paying of dysmes.	The whole act.
4 Hen. 7. c. 6	Forest of Inglewood Act 1488	An Acte that the Office of Steward Forester keep of the Forest of Inglewood shalbe voide.	The whole act.
4 Hen. 7. c. 7	Yeomen and Grooms of the Chamber Act 1488	An Acte that the Yeomen and Gromes of ye Kings Chamber geve theire Attendance on the Kinge.	The whole act.
4 Hen. 7. c. 8	Woollen Cloth Act 1488	Woolen Yarn.	The whole act.
4 Hen. 7. c. 9	Hats and Caps Act 1488	Hattes and Cappes.	The whole act.
4 Hen. 7. c. 11	Buying of Wool Act 1488	An Acte for the mayntenance of Drapery and making of Cloth.	The whole act.
4 Hen. 7. c. 12	Justice of the Peace Act 1488	An Acte for Justices of Peace for the due execucon of theire Comyssions.	The whole act.
4 Hen. 7. c. 17	Wardship Act 1488	An Act agaynst fraudulent feoffments tendinge to defraude the Kinge of his wardes.	The whole act.
4 Hen. 7. c. 18	Treason Act 1488	An Acte agaynst counterfeiting of forrayne Coyne.	The whole act.
4 Hen. 7. c. 19	Tillage Act 1488	An Acte agaynst pullying down of Tounes.	The whole act.
4 Hen. 7. c. 21	Orford Haven (Illegal Fishing Nets) Act 1488	An Acte for the Preservation of the Frye of Fyshe.	The whole act. (Note: This act was not included in the Statute Law Revision Act 1863 (26 & 27 Vict. c. 125). This act was repealed for England and Wales by the Sea Fisheries Act 1868 (31 & 32 Vict. c. 45).)
4 Hen. 7. c. 22	Gold Act 1488	An Acte agaynst the deceyptfull waight and working of the golde of Venice Florence & Jeane.	The whole act.
4 Hen. 7. c. 23	Exportation Act 1488	An Acte agaynst carrying awaye of coyne plate vessells or Jewells out of this Realme.	The whole act.
4 Hen. 7. c. 24	Fines Act 1488	An Act for pclamacions to be made uppon Fynes.	The whole act.
7 Hen. 7. c. 1	Soldiers Act 1491	An Act agaynst Captaynes for not paying theire Soldyers their Wages, and agaynst Soldyers going from their Captaynes without licence.	The whole act.
7 Hen. 7. c. 2	Service in the King's Wars Act 1491	An Act for dyvers priviledgs to be graunted to psons being in the Kings Warrs.	The whole act.
7 Hen. 7. c. 3	Weights and Measures Act 1491	An Acte for Waights and Measures.	The whole act.
7 Hen. 7. c. 5	Abbots, Priors, etc. Act 1491	An Acte that Abbotts & Pryors shall paye such quinzime & disme as they ought to paye by an Act in the tyme of King Edw. the Fowerth.	The whole act.
7 Hen. 7. c. 6	Scots Act 1491	Cona Scotos.	The whole act.
7 Hen. 7. c. 7	Customs Act 1491	An Act to paye Custome for every butt of Malmescy.	The whole act.
7 Hen. 7. c. 9	Fish Act 1491	Orford.	The whole act.
7 Hen. 7. c. 10	Outlawry in Lancashire Act 1491	An Acte that noe persons outlawed within the Co. of Lancaster should forfeit any of his lands or goods in any other shire but in the same shire.	The whole act. (Note: This act was not included in the Statute Law Revision Act 1863 (26 & 27 Vict. c. 125). This act was repealed for England and Wales by the Outlawry in Lancashire (No. 2) Act 1491 (7 Hen. 7. c. 24))
7 Hen. 7. c. 11	Taxation Act 1491	Conc xvme.	The whole act.
7 Hen. 7. c. 24	Outlawry in Lancashire (No. 2) Act 1491	An Act for the County Palentyne of Lancaster.	The whole act.
11 Hen. 7. c. 4	Weights and Measures Act 1495	An Acte for Wayghts and Measures.	The whole act.
11 Hen. 7. c. 6	Customs Act 1495	An Acte for the payment of Custumes for wollen Cloth transported.	The whole act.
11 Hen. 7. c. 7	Riot Act 1495	An Acte agaynst ryotts and unlawfull assemblyes.	The whole act.
11 Hen. 7. c. 8	Usury Act 1495	An Acte agaynst Usurye.	The whole act.
11 Hen. 7. c. 10	Taxation Act 1495	P Benevolencia.	The whole act.
11 Hen. 7. c. 11	Worsted Act 1495	An Acte agaynst such Sherers of Worstede as have not byn apprentices to that Trade.	The whole act.
11 Hen. 7. c. 16	Calais Act 1495	Villa Cales.	The whole act.
11 Hen. 7. c. 18	Attendance in War Act 1495	An Acte that the Master of the Rolls and other Offycers of the Chauncery shall not goe to the Warrs.	The whole act.
11 Hen. 7. c. 22	Wages of Labourers, etc. Act 1495	An Act for Servants Wages.	The whole act.
11 Hen. 7. c. 23	Fish Act 1495	An Acte agaynst Marchaunt Straungers for sellyng of Samon or other fyshe.	The whole act.
11 Hen. 7. c. 24	Attaints Act 1495	An Acte for Writts of Attaynt to be brought against Jurors for untrue Verdicts.	The whole act.

== See also ==
- Statute Law Revision Act
