= Repeal of Acts Concerning Importation Act 1822 =

Act of the Parliament of the United Kingdom

- Act of Parliament
- Parliament of the United Kingdom
- Long title: An Act to repeal divers ancient Statutes and Parts of Statutes, so far as they relate to the Importation and Exportation of Goods and Merchandize from and to Foreign Countries.
- Citation: 3 Geo. 4. c. 41
- Introduced by: Thomas Wallace MP (Commons); Robert Jenkinson, 2nd Earl of Liverpool (Lords)
- Territorial extent: United Kingdom

Dates
- Royal assent: 24 June 1822
- Commencement: 24 June 1822 (Note: The Acts of Parliament (Commencement) Act 1793.)
- Repealed: 5 August 1873
Other legislation
Amends	See § Repealed enactments
Repeals/revokes	See § Repealed enactments
Repealed by	Statute Law Revision Act 1873
Relates to	Continuance, etc. of Laws Act 1603; Continuance, etc. of Laws Act 1623; Importation (No. 4) Act 1816; Importation, etc. Act 1819; Repeal of Acts Concerning Importation (No. 2) Act 1822; Navigation and Commerce Act 1822; Trade Act 1822; Trade Act (No. 2) 1822

Status: Repealed

History of passage through Parliament

Records of Parliamentary debate relating to the statute from Hansard

Text of statute as originally enacted

The Repeal of Acts Concerning Importation Act 1822 (3 Geo. 4. c. 41) was an act of the Parliament of the United Kingdom that repealed enactments relating to navigation in the United Kingdom.

== Background ==
In the United Kingdom, acts of Parliament remain in force until expressly repealed. Blackstone's Commentaries on the Laws of England, published in the late 18th century, raised questions about the system and structure of the common law and the poor drafting and disorder of the existing statute book.

In 1806, the Commission on Public Records passed a resolution requesting the production of a report on the best mode of reducing the volume of the statute book. From 1810 to 1825, The Statutes of the Realm was published, providing for the first time the authoritative collection of acts.

By the early 19th century, British customs law, relating to trade, navigation, the import and export of goods, and the collection of customs revenue, had become increasingly intricate and difficult to navigate due to the large number of acts passed that had accumulated over many years. This complexity posed challenges for both commerce and law enforcement. The preamble of the act acknowledged that the existing system had become an impediment to trade and proposed the repeal of inconsistent or obsolete acts "for the encouraging of shipping and navigation."

In 1810, the Lords of the Treasury asked Nicholas Jickling to produce a Digest of the Laws of the Customs, which was published in 1815, numbering 1,375 pages from the earliest period to 53 Geo. 3. This Digest was continuously published to bring the state of the law up to date to the end of every session. In 1814, the Commission of Public Records published their 14th Report, recommending consolidation of the statute law.

In 1822, bills were introduced to encourage shipping and navigation and to repeal related inconsistent or obsolete enactments.

== Passage ==
Leave to bring in the Ancient Commercial Statutes Bill to the House of Commons was granted to James Brogden MP and the Vice-President of the Board of Trade, Thomas Wallace MP on 19 March 1822. The bill had its first reading in the House of Commons on 25 March 1822, presented by the Vice-President of the Board of Trade, Thomas Wallace MP. The bill had its second reading in the House of Commons on 6 May 1822 and was committed to a committee of the whole house, which met on 20 May 1822 and reported on 23 May 1822, with amendments. The amended bill had its third reading in the House of Commons on 4 July 1822 and passed, without amendments.

The bill, now named the Commercial Statutes Repeal Bill, had its first reading in the House of Lords on 6 June 1822. The bill had its second reading in the House of Lords on 17 June 1822, introduced by Robert Jenkinson, 2nd Earl of Liverpool, and was committed to a committee of the whole house, which met and reported on 18 June 1822, without amendments. The bill had its third reading in the House of Lords on 19 June 1822 and passed, with amendments.

The amended bill was considered and agreed to by the House of Commons on 20 June 1822.

The bill was granted royal assent on 24 June 1822.

== Repealed enactments ==
Section 1 of the act repealed 75 enactments relating to importation of goods, commerce or navigation, listed in that section.

Citation	Short title	Description	Extent of repeal
Stat. Temp. Incert. Statutum de Moneta	Statute Concerning Money	A Statute of uncertain Date, concerning Money.	Whereby it is forbidden on the King's Behalf, that none bring Money into the Country but only for his Expences.
Stat. Temp. Incert. Statutum de Moneta	Statute Concerning Money	A Statute of uncertain Date, concerning Money.	As relates to any Money so brought.
9 Edw. 3. st. 1. c. 1	Foreign and other merchants	A Statute made in the Ninth Year of the Reign of King Edward the Third.	Whereby it is ordained and established, "That all Merchants Strangers and Denizens, and all other and every of them, of what Estate or Condition soever they be, that shall buy or sell Corn, Wines, Avoirdupois, Flesh, Fish and all other Livings and Victuals, Wools, Cloths, Wares, Merchandizes and all other Things vendible, from whencesoever they come, by Foreigners or Denizens, at what Place soever it be, City, Borough, Town, Port of the Sea, Fair, Market or elsewhere within the Realm, within Franchise or without, may freely, without Interruption, sell them to what Persons it shall please them, as well to Foreigners as to Denizens, except always the Enemies of our Lord the King and his Realm;"
9 Edw. 3. st. 1. c. 1	Foreign and other merchants	A Statute made in the Ninth Year of the Reign of King Edward the Third.	Whereby any Damages are given, or any Penalty or Punishment, or Loss of Franchise is imposed or inflicted, for any Disturbance to any Merchants, contrary to the said Statute.
9 Edw. 3. st. 1. c. 1	Foreign and other merchants	A Statute made in the Ninth Year of the Reign of King Edward the Third.	Whereby it is ordained and established, " That no Alien or Denizen shall be troubled, but that he may freely buy such Things aforesaid in the said Places, and carry them where it pleaseth him;"
11 Edw. 3. c. 2	Cloth Act 1337	A Statute made in the Eleventh Year of the Reign of the said King Edward the Third.	Whereby it is accorded, "That no Man or Woman of England, Ireland, Wales or Scotland, (the King, Queen, and their Children only except), shall wear no Cloth, other than is made in England, Ireland, Wales or Scotland, upon pain of Forfeiture of the same Cloth, and further to be punished at the King's Will;"
11 Edw. 3. c. 3	Importation Act 1337	A Statute made in the Eleventh Year of the Reign of the said King Edward the Third.	Whereby it is accorded and established, "That no Merchant, Foreign nor Denizen, nor none other, shall bring or cause to be brought privily or openly, by himself nor by other, into the Lands of England, Ireland, Wales and Scotland, within the King's Power, any Cloths made in any other Places than in the same, upon the Forfeiture of the said Cloths, and further to be punished at the King's Will;"
14 Edw. 3. st. 2. c. 2	N/A	A Statute made in the Fourteenth Year of the Reign of the said King Edward the Third.	Whereby it is granted or provided, "That all Merchants, Denizens and Foreigners, except those which be of the King's Enmity, may without Let safely come into the Realm of England with their Goods and Merchandize;"
18 Edw. 1. st. 1. c. 3	Freedom of trade	A Statute made in the Eighteenth Year of the Reign of the said King Edward the Third.	Whereby it is granted or provided, "That the Sea be open to all Manner of Merchants, to pass with their Merchandize where it shall please them;"
25 Edw. 3. st. 3. c. 2	Aulneger, foreign and other merchants, forestalling, weirs	A Statutes made in the Twenty fifth Year of the Reign of the said King Edward the Third.	Whereby it is accorded, "That the said herein before recited Statute, made in the Ninth Year of the said King Edward the Third, in all Points and Articles contained in the same, be holden, kept and maintained; and that if any Statute, Charter, Letters, confirming Patents, Proclamation or Commandment, Usage, Allowance or Judgment be made to the contrary, the and enlarging same shall be openly repealed, void and holden for none; and moreover, that every Merchant or other of what Condition he be, as well Alien as Denizen, that bring Wines, Flesh, Fish or other Victuals, Cloths, Woolfells, Avoirdupois or any other manner of Merchandizes or Chaffer, to the City of London, or other Cities, Boroughs or good Towns of England, or Ports of the Sea, may freely and without Challenge or Impeachment of any, sell them in Gross or at Retail, or by Parcels, at his Will, to all manner of People that will buy the same, notwithstanding any Franchises, Grants or Custom used, or any other thing done to the contrary;"
27 Edw. 3. st. 1. c. 6	Importation of wine	A Statute made in the Twenty seventh Year of the Reign of the said King Edward the Third.	Whereby it is ordained and established, "That all Merchants, Gascoins and other Strangers, may safely bring their Wines into England, to what Port that shall please them, and thereof make their Profits;"
27 Edw. 3. st. 1. c. 5	Forestallers	A Statute made in the Twenty seventh Year of the Reign of the said King Edward the Third.	As relates to the buying or engrossing or forestalling of Wines in Gascoigne, and as imposes any Penalty or Forfeiture in respect of such buying, engrossing or forestalling.
27 Edw. 3. st. 1. c. 7	Buying of wines	A Statute made in the Twenty seventh Year of the Reign of the said King Edward the Third.	As relates to the buying or engrossing or forestalling of Wines in Gascoigne, and as imposes any Penalty or Forfeiture in respect of such buying, engrossing or forestalling.
27 Edw. 3. st. 1. c. 8	Gauging of wines	A Statute made in the Twenty seventh Year of the Reign of the said King Edward the Third.	As relates to the gauging of Wines by the King's Gauger or his Deputy.
27 Edw. 3. st. 2. c. 2	Ordinance of the Staples 1353	The Statute or Ordinance of the Staples made in the Twenty seventh Year of the Reign of the said King Edward the Third.	Whereby it is ordained, established or provided, "That all Merchants Strangers which be not of the King's Enmity, of what Land or Nation that they be, may safely and surely come and dwell in the Realm of England and Land of Wales where they will, and from thence return with their Ships, Wares and all manner of Merchandizes, and freely sell their Merchandizes at the Staple and elsewhere within the same Realm and Lands, to any that will buy them;"
28 Edw. 3. c. 13	Confirmation, etc., of 27 Ed. 3. St. 2 Act 1354	A Statute made in the Twenty eighth Year of the Reign of the said King Edward the Third	Whereby it is accorded and established, "That no manner of Ship, which is fraught towards England or elsewhere, be compelled to come to any Port of England, nor there to abide, against the Will of the Masters and Mariners of the same, or of the Merchants whose the Goods be; and if such Ships come of their own good Will or be driven by Tempests or other Misfortune or Mischief, to any Port in England, and the Masters, Mariners or Merchants of the same Ships will sell or deliver Part of their Merchandizes with their good Will, it shall be lawful for every Man to buy such Merchandize freely without Impeachment, in the Port where such Ships shall come, albeit the said Merchandizes be not put to land to sell; so that the Masters, Mariners and Merchants, after that they have sold that which pleaseth them of their said Goods, and paid thereof the Customs, may freely depart and go with their Ships and all the Remnant of their Goods whither it shall please them, without Custom thereof to be paid;
28 Edw. 3. c. 13	Confirmation, etc., of 27 Ed. 3. St. 2 Act 1354	A Statute made in the Twenty eighth Year of the Reign of the said King Edward the Third	As imposes any Forfeiture upon disturbing or hindering such Merchants.
31 Edw. 3. st. 1. c. 5	Wine	A Statute made in the Thirty first Year of the Reign of the said King Edward the Third, in the Parliament holden at Westminster, on the Monday next after Easter Week.	As relates to the Contents of Tuns of Wine and the Gauging thereof. (Note: Due to section 9 of the repealing act, this act was wholly repealed by the Weights and Measures Act 1824 (5 Geo. 4. c. 74).)
37 Edw. 3. c. 16	Statut' de Victu et Vestitu	A Statute made in the Thirty seventh Year of the Reign of the said King Edward the Third.	Whereby the Statutes of Wines of the Twenty seventh Year of the said King is confirmed or altered or amended.
38 Edw. 3. st. 1. c. 2	Gold and silver, fines, merchants, jurors, etc.	A Statute made in the Thirty eighth Year of the Reign of the said King Edward the Third.	Whereby it was ordained that all Merchants, as well Aliens as Denizens, may sell and buy all manner of Merchandizes, and freely carry them out of the Realm.
38 Edw. 3. st. 1. c. 8	Gold and silver, fines, merchants, jurors, etc.	A Statute made in the Thirty eighth Year of the Reign of the said King Edward the Third.	Whereby it is accorded and assented, "That no Owner shall lose his Ship for a small Thing put within the Ship not customed, without his Knowledge or Privity;"
38 Edw. 3. st. 1. c. 10	Gold and silver, fines, merchants, jurors, etc.	A Statute made in the Thirty eighth Year of the Reign of the said King Edward the Third.	Whereby it is assented, "That the Statutes and Ordinances made as to the Merchandize of Wines, and of those that pass the Sea to fetch Wines in Gascoigne, shall stand in force;"
38 Edw. 3. st. 1. c. 11	Gold and silver, fines, merchants, jurors, etc.	A Statute made in the Thirty eighth Year of the Reign of the said King Edward the Third.	Whereby it is granted or provided, "That the Gascoignes, and all other Aliens, may come into the Realm with their Wines and freely sell them without any Disturbance or Impeachment;" and whereby it is saved to the King, "That it may be lawful for him, whensoever it shall seem meet to him and his good Council, to ordain on this Article in the manner as best shall seem to him, for the Profit of him and his Commons."
42 Edw. 3. c. 8	Importation of wine	A Statute made in the Forty second Year of the Reign of the said King Edward the Third.	Whereby it is assented and accorded, "That no Englishman shall pass into Gascoigne to seek Wines there, but they shall be brought into England by the Gascoignes and other Aliens; and that all the Ships of England and of Gascoigne that cometh into Gascoigne, shall be first freighted to bring Wines into England before all other;"
43 Edw. 3. c. 1	The staple	A Statute made in the Importation of Forty third Year of the Reign of the said King Edward the Third.	Whereby it is ordained, "That all Merchants, Aliens and Denizens, may freely go through England, Ireland and Wales, and buy and sell Wool, Woolfells and Leather and all other Merchandizes at their Will, without Impeachment or Disturbance;"
43 Edw. 3. c. 2	Trade with Gascony	A Statute made in the Importation of Forty third Year of the Reign of the said King Edward the Third.	As relates to Englishmen, Irishmen or Welshmen, passing into Gascoigne to fetch Wines there.
2 Ric. 2. st. 1. c. 1	Merchants	A Statute made at Gloucester, in the Second Year of the Reign of King Richard the Second.	Whereby it is ordained and established, "That all Merchants, Aliens of what Realms, Countries or Seignories that they come, which be of the Amity of the King and of his Realm, may safely and surely come within the Realm of England, and in all Cities, Boroughs, Ports of the Sea, Fairs, Markets or other Places within the Realm, within Franchise and without may abide with their Goods and all Merchandizes, under the Safeguard and Protection of the King as long as shall please them, without Disturbance or Denying of any Person; and that as well those Merchants Aliens as Denizens whatsoever and every of them, that will buy and sell Corn, Flesh, Fish and all manner other Victuals and Sustenance and also all manner of Spiceries, Fruit, Tea and all manner of small Wares, as Silk, Gold Wire or Silver Wire, Coverchiefs and other such small Ware, may freely and without Denying or any manner of Disturbance, as well in the City of London as in all Cities, Boroughs, Ports of the Sea, Fairs, Markets and other Places within the Realm, sell and buy in gross or by Parcels, to whom and of whom they please, Denizens or Foreign, except the King's Enemies; and except also, that all manner of Wines shall be sold by the said Strangers in gross, as in the said Statute is mentioned; and as to all other great Wares, as Cloth of Gold and Silver, Silk, Sendal, Napery, Linen Cloth, Canvas and other such great Wares, and also all manner of other great Merchandizes not above expressed whatsoever they be, as well Aliens as Denizens, as well in the City of London as in other Cities, Boroughs, Ports of the Sea, Towns, Fairs, Markets and elsewhere through the said Realm, within Franchise and without, may sell the same in gross only, to every Person Foreign or Denizen that will buy the same, freely and without denying (except as in the said Statute is excepted); notwithstanding any Statutes, Ordinances, Charters, Judgments, Allowances, Customs and Usages made or suffered to the contrary; which Charters and Franchises, if any there be, shall be utterly repealed, as a Thing made, used or granted against the common Profit in oppression of the People;"
2 Ric. 2. st. 1. c. 1	Merchants	A Statute made at Gloucester, in the Second Year of the Reign of King Richard the Second.	Whereby any Damages are given, or any Penalty or Punishment, or Loss of Franchise is imposed or inflicted for any Disturbance, to any Merchant, contrary to the said Provisions of the said Statute.
2 Ric. 2. st. 1. c.	Merchants	A Statute made at Gloucester, in the Second Year of the Reign of King Richard the Second.	Whereby it is ordained or assented, "That all Merchants of Genoa, Venice, Catalonia, Arragon and of other Realms, Lands and Countries towards the West, being of the King's Amity, Merchants of that will bring to Hampton or elsewhere within the Realm, Carracks, Ships, Gallies or other Vessels Genoa and the charged or discharged, may there freely sell their Merchandizes to whom they please, and there recharge their Vessels with Wools, Leather, Woolfells, Lead, Tin and other Merchandizes of the Staple, and freely carry them into their Country towards the West, under the Regulations in the said Statute mentioned and contained;"
4 Ric. 2. c. 1	Gauging of vessels of wine, etc.	A Statute made in the Fourth Year of the Reign of the said King Richard the Second.	As relates to the gauging of all Vessels of Wine, Honey, Oil and other Gauging Wine, Liquors brought into the Realm. (Note: Due to section 9 of the repealing act, this act was wholly repealed by the Weights and Measures Act 1824 (5 Geo. 4. c. 74).)
5 Ric. 2. st. 1. c. 3	Merchant strangers	A Statute made in the Fifth Year of the Reign of the said King Richard the Second, in a Parliament holden on the Morrow after All Souls.	Whereby it is assented and accorded, " That none of the King's liege People do ship any Merchandize in going out Subjects to or coming within the Realm of England, in any Port or any where, but only in Ships of the King's Ligeance; and that every Person of the said Ligeance, which do ship and merchandize in any other Ships or Ships. Vessels upon the Sea than of the said Ligeance, shall forfeit to the King all his Merchandizes shipped in other Vessels, or the Value of the same;"
5 Ric. 2. st. 2. c. 1	Merchant strangers	A Statute made in the said Fifth Year of the Reign of the said King Richard the Second, in the Parliament holden on the Morrow of Saint John Port Latin.	Whereby it is accorded and assented, "That all manner of Merchants Strangers, of whatsoever Nation or Country they be, being of the Amity of the King and of his Realm, shall be welcome, and Amity, freely may come within the Realm of England and elsewhere within the King's Power, as well within Franchise as without, and there to be conversant to Merchandize, and tarry as long as them liketh, as those whom our said Lord the King taketh into his Protection and Safeguard, with their Goods, Merchandizes and all manner Familiars; and that they and every of them, with their Merchandizes and all manner of Goods, be suffered to go and come without Disturbance or Impeachment of any.
6 Ric. 2. st. 1. c. 8	N/A	A Statute made in the Sixth Year of the Reign of the said King Richard the Second.	Whereby it is ordained and granted, " That the Statute made in the Fifth Year of the said King Richard Restraining the Second (and hereinbefore recited), that none of the King's liege People do ship any Merchandize, Operation of but only in Ships of the King's Ligeance, should only have place so long as Ships of the said Ligeance, in the Parts where the said Merchants shall happen to dwell, be found able and sufficient; so that then where English they shall be bound to freight the same Ships of the King's Ligeance with their Merchandizes before all Ships maybe other Ships; and otherwise, it shall be lawful to the said Merchants to hire other Ships convenient, and found. there to freight them with their Goods and Merchandizes, notwithstanding the said First Statute;"
6 Ric. 2. st. 1. c. 10	N/A	A Statute made in the Sixth Year of the Reign of the said King Richard the Second.	Whereby by it is ordained and accorded, "That all manner of Foreigners and Aliens, being of the Amity of the King and his Realm, and coming within the City of London and other Cities, Boroughs and Towns within the Realm, with Fish and all manner of other Importation of Victuals, there tarrying and going again to their own Countries, shall be under the Safeguard and special visions by Protection of our Lord the King; and that there it shall be lawful for them and every to cut their Fishes Aliens. and Victuals aforesaid in Pieces, and in part, or in all, at retale, or in gross, as to them best shall seem, to sell and make their Profit;"
11 Ric. 2. c. 7	Confirmation of 10 Ric. 2, indemnity, etc.	A Statute made in the Eleventh Year of the Reign of the said King Richard the Second.	Whereby it is ordained and established, "That the said confirming Statutes of the Ninth and Twenty fifth Years of the Reign of King Edward the Third (hereinbefore recited, and as recited in the said Statute of the Eleventh Year of King Richard the Second,) shall be firmly holden, kept, maintained and fully executed in all the Points and Articles of the same, not withstanding any Ordinance, Statute, Charter, Letters Patents, Franchise, Proclamation, Commandant, to the contrary Usage, Allowance or Judgment made or used to the contrary; and that if any such Statute, Ordinance, declared void. Charter, Letters Patents, Franchise, Proclamation, Commandment, Usage, Allowance or Judgment be made or used to the contrary, it shall be utterly repealed, avoided and holden for none;"
14 Ric. 2. c. 1	The staple	The said Statute made in the Fourteenth Year of the Reign of the said King Richard the Second.	Whereby it is ordained and established, "That every Person Alien that bringeth any Merchandize into England, shall find sufficient Sureties before the Customers in the Port where the Merchandize shall be brought, to buy other Merchandize, to the Value of Half the said Merchandizes so brought at the least, as Wools, Leather, Woolfells, Lead, Tin, Butter, Cheese, Cloth or other Commodities of the Land;"
14 Ric. 2. c. 2	Trading	The said Statute made in the Fourteenth Year of the Reign of the said King Richard the Second.	Whereby it is ordained and established, "That for every Exchange that shall be made by Merchants to the Court of Rome or elsewhere, the said Merchants be bound in Chancery to buy, within Three Months after the said Exchange made, Merchandizes of the EStaple or other Commodities of the Land to the Value of the Sums so exchanged, upon pain of Forfeiture oof the same;"
14 Ric. 2. c. 6	Trading	The said Statute made in the Fourteenth Year of the Reign of the said King Richard the Second.	Whereby it is ordained and established, "That all Merchants of the Realm of England shall freight in the said Realm the Ships of the said Subjects shall Realm, and not strange Ships, so that the Owners of the said Ships take reasonable Gains for the Freight of the same"
14 Ric. 2. c. 10	Customs	The said Statute made in the Fourteenth Year of the Reign of the said King Richard the Second.	Whereby it is ordained and established, "That no Customer nor Comptroller have any Ships of their own, nor meddle with the Freight of Ships;"
16 Ric. 2. c. 1	Trade Act 1392	A Statute made in the Sixteenth Year of the Reign of the said King Richard the Second.	Whereby it is ordained and assented, "That no Merchant Stranger Alien shall sell nor buy nor merchandize with another strange Merchant Alien to sell again; nor that no Stranger Merchant Alien shall sell to retail within the said Realm, nor shall put to Sale any manner of Wares or Merchandizes, except Livings and Victuals; and also, that all Aliens shall sell Wines by whole Vessels, and Spiceries by whole Vessels and Bales, and in no other manner;"
20 Ric. 2. c. 4	A confirmation of part of the stat. of 28 Ed. III. c 13. (Note: Confirmation, etc., of 27 Ed. 3. St. 2 Act 1354 (28 Edw. 3. c. 13)) touching merchant strangers.	A Statute made in the Twentieth Year of the Reign of King Richard the Second.	Whereby it is granted or provided, " That so much of the said Statute of the Twenty eighth Year of the Reign of King Edward the Third (as is hereinbefore recited, and as is recited in the said Statute of the Twenty Year of King Richard the Second), shall be holden and kept in all Points, and duly executed, notwithstanding any Ordinance or Usage to the contrary;"
1 Hen. 4. c. 17	Strangers may buy and sell within the realm victuals in grose or by retail.	A Statute made in the First Year of the Reign of King Henry the Fourth	Whereby it is ordained and established, "That so much of the Statute made in the Sixth Year of the Reign of King Richard the Second (as is hereinbefore recited relating to Fish and Victuals imported by Aliens), should be firmly holden and kept and duly executed after the Form and Effect thereof, notwithstanding certain Letters Patents granted to the contrary to the Fishmongers of London, by the said King Richard the Second;"
4 Hen. 4. c. 15	Exportation of gold and silver	A Statute made in the Fourth Year of the Reign of the said King Henry the Fourth	Whereby it is ordained and established, "That all the Merchants Aliens, Strangers and Denizens, which bring Merchandizes into this Realm of England, and the same do sell within the Realm, and receive English Money for the same, that they shall bestow the same Money upon other Merchandizes of England, for to carry the same out of the Realm of England, without carrying any Gold or Silver in Coin, Plate or Mass, out of the said Realm, upon pain of Forfeiture of the same, saving always their reasonable Costs;"
4 Hen. 4. c. 20	Customs	The said Statute made in the said Fourth Year of the Reign of the said King Henry the Fourth.	Whereby it is ordained and established, "That all manner of Merchandizes entering into the Realm of England, or going out of the same, shall be charged and discharged in the great Ports of the Sea, and not in Creeks and small Arrivals, upon pain to forfeit all the Merchandizes so charged or discharged to our Lord the King; except Vessels or Merchandizes arriving in such little Creeks and arrivals by Cohertion of Tempest of the Sea;"
5 Hen. 4. c. 7	Merchant Strangers	A Statute made in the Fifth Year of the Reign of the said King Henry the Fourth.	Whereby it is ordained and established, "That all the Merchants Strangers of what Estate or Condition that they be, coming, dwelling or repairing within the Realm of England, shall be entreated and demeaned within the same Realm, in the Manner, Form and Condition as the Merchants Denizens be, or shall be entreated and demeaned in the Parts beyond the Sea, upon Pain to forfeit to the King all the Goods and Chattels of such Merchants Strangers, and upon pain of Imprisonment of the Bodies of such Merchants Strangers;"
5 Hen. 4. c. 9	Trade Act 1403	A Statute made in the Fifth Year of the Reign of the said King Henry the Fourth.	Whereby it is ordained and established, "That the Customers and Comptrollers in all the Ports of England shall take sufficient Sureties for all manner of Merchandizes brought by the Merchants Aliens and Strangers coming and repairing to the said Ports, to the Intent that the Money taken for the said Merchandize shall be employed upon the Commodities of the Realm, saving their reasonable Costs; and that the said Merchants Aliens and Strangers, shall sell their said Merchandizes so brought within the said Realm, within a Quarter of a Year next after their coming into the same; and also, that the Money which shall be delivered by Exchange in England, be employed upon the Commodities of the Realm within the same Realm, upon pain of Forfeiture of the same Money; and that no Merchant Alien nor Stranger sell any manner of Merchandize to any other Merchant Alien or Stranger, upon pain of Forfeiture of the said Merchandize; and that in every City, Town and Port of the Sea in England, where the said Merchants Aliens or Strangers be, or shall be repairing, sufficient Hosts shall be assigned to the same Merchants by the Mayor, Sheriffs, or Bailiffs of the said Cities, Towns and Ports of the Sea, and that the said Merchants Aliens and Strangers shall dwell in no other Place but with their said Hosts so to be assigned;"
6 Hen. 4. c. 4	Exportation	A Statute made in the Sixth Year of the Reign of the said King Henry the Fourth.	Whereby so much of the said Statute of the Fifth Year of the said King Henry the Fourth, as is herein before last recited, is repealed.
11 Hen. 4. c. 8	The lord chancellor shall send the estreats of exchanges taken of merchants into the exchequer every fifteen days.	A Statute made in the Eleventh Year of the Reign of the said King Henry the Fourth.	Whereby it is ordained and established, "That so much of the Statute made in the confirming and Fourteenth Year of Reign of King Richard the Second, as is herein before recited, respecting Exchanges by Merchants to the Court of Rome, or elsewhere, should be firmly holden and kept, and put in due Execution;" with a certain Addition thereto, as in the said Statute of the Eleventh Year of the said King Henry the Fourth is mentioned and set forth.
4 Hen. 5. st. 2. c. 5 (Note: The text of the act cites this as "4 Hen. 5. c. 5. confirming and amending 5 Hen. 3. c. 7, 9.")	Merchant strangers	A Statute made in the Fourth Year of the Reign of King Henry the Fifth.	Whereby it is granted and provided, "That so much of the Statute made in the Fifth Year of the Reign of King Henry the Fourth, as is herein before recited, shall be firmly holden and kept in all Points, and put in due Execution according to the Contents of the same;"
9 Hen. 5. st. 2. c. 9	Exchanges Act 1421	A Statute made in the Parliament holden on the First Day of December, in the Ninth Year of the Reign of the said King Henry the Fifth, and of a Statute made in the First Year of King Henry the Sixth.	Whereby it is ordained, "That all Merchants that shall make Exchanges to the Court of Rome, or elsewhere, shall be bound personally in the Chancery, by Recognizance, to buy within Nine Months after the same Exchanges made, Merchandizes and Commodities of England, to the Value of the Sums so changed, upon pain of Forfeiture of the same;"
2 Hen. 6. c. 14 (Note: Vulgo 11.)	Measures Act 1423	A Statute made in the Second Year of the Reign of King Henry the Sixth.	Whereby it is ordained and established, "That no Man shall bring into the Realm of England, from what Country soever it be, nor make within the said Realm, a Tun of Wine, except it contains of the English Measure Two hundred and fifty two Gallons, the Pipe One hundred and twenty six Gallons, and so after the Rate the Tertian and the Hogshead of Gascoin Wine, upon Pain of Forfeiture of the same Wine; nor Barrel of Herring, nor of Eels, unless they contain Thirty Gallons fully Barrels, &c. of packed, nor Butt of Salmon unless it contain Eighty four Gallons fully packed, nor Kinderkins, Tertians and Firkins of Herring, nor of Eels, nor of Salmon, but after the Rate, fully packed, upon Pain of Forfeiture of the said Herring, Eels and Salmon;"
8 Hen. 6. c. 19	Exportation	A Statute made in the Eighth Year of the Reign of the said King Henry the Sixth.	Whereby it is ordained, "That no Mariner, Stranger nor other Mariner, that is both Owner and Master of any Ship or Vessel, shall take nor receive within England, Wales nor Ireland, in his Ship or Vessel, any manner of Wools, Woolfells nor other Merchandizes of the Staple, nor carry the same out of the Realm to any Port beyond the Sea, but only to the Staple of Calais, except such which shall pass beyond the Straits of Marrok; and that upon Pain of Forfeiture to the King, as well of such Ships and Goods so found defective, as of the Goods of the said Mariners being in the same Ships or Vessels;"
8 Hen. 6. c. 24	Trade with Aliens Act 1429	A Statute made in the Eighth Year of the Reign of the said King Henry the Sixth.	Whereby it is ordained, " That no Merchant Alien shall constrain nor bind any of the King's liege People to make him Payment in Gold for any manner of Debt which to him may be due, nor refuse to receive Payment in Silver for any manner of such Duty or Debt; and that no Englishman shall sell within the Realm, or cause to be sold to any Merchant Alien, any manner of Merchandize, but only for ready Payment in Money, or else in Merchandizes for Merchandizes, to be paid and contented in hand upon Pain of Forfeiture of the same;"
9 Hen. 6. c. 2	Trade with Aliens	A Statute made in the Ninth Year of the Reign of King Henry the Sixth.	As relates to the Sale of Cloths by English Merchants to Merchants Aliens;
14 Hen. 6. c. 6	Alien Merchants	A Statute made in the Fourteenth Year of the Reign of the said King Henry the Sixth.	Whereby it is ordained and established, "That so much of the Statutes made in the Sixth Year of the Reign of King Richard the Second, and in the First Year of the Reign of King Henry the Fourth, as is hereinbefore recited, relating to Fish and Victuals imported by Aliens, should be firmly holden and kept; any other Statutes or Ordinances made to the contrary notwithstanding;" with a certain Addition to the said Statutes as in the said Statute of the Fourteenth Year of King Henry the Sixth is mentioned and set forth.
14 Hen. 6. c. 7	Alien Goods Act 1435	A Statute made in the Fourteenth Year of the Reign of the said King Henry the Sixth.	Whereby it is granted and ordained, "That if it happen that any Merchandizes of Aliens of the King's Amity to be taken by the King's Lieges in any Ships or Vessels of the King's Enemies, not being under the King's safe Conduct or Protection, that the said Lieges may them retain and enjoy, without any Impeachment or Restitution thereof to be made;"
18 Hen. 6. c. 4	Alien Merchants Act 1439	A Statute made in the Eighteenth Year of the Reign of King Henry the Sixth.	Whereby it is ordained, "That no Merchant Alien or Stranger shall sell no manner of Merchandize to other Merchant Alien or Stranger, upon Pain of forfeiting of the same Merchandizes; and that all Merchants Aliens and Strangers, coming or abiding to Merchandize within any City, Town, Borough or Port in England, shall be under the Surveying of certain People to be called Hosts or Surveyors, to them to be assigned in manner directed by the said Statute;" As relate to such Merchants Aliens and their Hosts.
18 Hen. 6. c. 17	Vessels of Wine, etc. Act 1439	A Statute made in the Eighteenth Year of the Reign of King Henry the Sixth.	As relates to the gauging of Vessels Wine, Oil and Honey
20 Hen. 6. c. 5	No customer, &c. shall have a ship of his own, use merchandise, keep a wharf or inn, or be a factor.	A Statute made in the Twentieth Year of the Reign of the said King Henry the Sixth.	Whereby it is ordained and established, "That no Customer nor Comptroller of the Customs, Clerks, Deputies or Ministers, or their Servants or Factors, nor Searchers nor Comptrollers, nor Surveyors of Searchers, nor their Clerks, Deputies, Ministers or Factors shall have any Ships of their own, nor shall buy or sell by way or by colour of Merchandize, nor shall not meddle with Freighting of Ships, nor have or occupy any Wharfs or Quays, nor hold any Hosteries or Taverns, nor shall be any Factors or Attornies for Merchants, Denizen or Alien, nor shall be Host to any Merchant Alien;"
23 Hen. 6. c. 15	Gauge Penny	A Statute made in the Twenty third Year of the Reign of King Henry the Sixth.	As relates to the Duty of a Gauger, or to the Penny called the Gauge Penny.
27 Hen. 6. c. 1	Importation	A Statute made in the Twenty seventh Year of the Reign of the said King Henry the Sixth.	Whereby the Importation of Merchandize of the growing or Workmanship of Brabant, Holland and Zealand, was prohibited or restrained.
27 Hen. 6. c. 3	Exportation (No. 2)	A Statute made in the Twenty seventh Year of the Reign of the said King Henry the Sixth.	Whereby it is ordained, " That if any Merchants Aliens and Strangers bring Wheat Corn or any other Merchandizes or Victual into any Haven, English Port or Creek, or other Places of this Realm, that the Mayors, Bailiffs, Portreves, Customers, Comptrollers and Searchers, and other Officers of the said Port, Haven or Creek, or other Places, shall have Authority to seize all Ships, Barges and Vessels freighted with Wheat Corn or any other Merchandizes or Victual brought into this Realm to sell, and to take Security of all the said Merchants Aliens and Strangers that the Money which shall be taken or received for the said Wheat Corn and other Merchandizes or Victual, shall be employed upon the Merchandizes and Commodities of this Realm;"
28 Hen. 6. c. 1	Importation	A Statute made in the Twenty eighth Year of the Reign of the said King Henry the Sixth.	Whereby the Provisions of so much of the said recited Statute, of the Twenty seventh Year of the said King Henry the Sixth, as relates to Importation from Brabant, Holland and Zealand, are continued in force.
33 Hen. 6. c. 5	Importation Act 1455	A Statute made in the Thirty third Year of the Reign of the said King Henry the Sixth.	Whereby it is ordained and established, " That if any Lombard or any other Person, Stranger or Denizen, bring or cause to be brought, by way of Merchandize, any wrought Silk thrown, Ribbands, Laces, Corses of Silk or any other Thing wrought, touching or concerning the Mystery of Silk Women, the Corses which come from Genoa only excepted, into any Port or Place of the Realm from beyond the Sea, that the same wrought Silk thrown, Ribbands, Laces, Corses, and other Things so brought and wrought, concerning the same Mysteries, shall be forfeit;"
33 Hen. 6. c. 5	Importation Act 1455	A Statute made in the Thirty third Year of the Reign of the said King Henry the Sixth.	Whereby any Penalty is imposed in respect of such Importation, or as authorizes the Appointment of any Searchers for Things so imported.
3 Edw. 4. c. c. 1	Exportation Act 1463	A Statute made in the Third Year of the Reign of King Edward the Fourth.	Whereby it is ordained and established, "That no Person inhabiting within the Realm, other than Merchant Strangers, shall freight nor charge within the Realm of England or Wales any Ship or other Vessel of any Alien or Stranger, with any Merchandizes to be carried out of the said Realm or Wales, or to be brought into the same, if he may have sufficient Freight in the Ships or Vessels of the Denizens of this Realm, upon Pain to forfeit the same Merchandizes;"
3 Edw. 4. c 3	Importation of Silk Act 1463	A Statute made in the Third Year of the Reign of King Edward the Fourth.	Whereby the Importation of any wrought Silk thrown, Ribbands, Laces, Corses of Silk, or other Things wrought, concerning the Craft of Silk Women, is prohibited or restrained.
4 Edw. 4. c. 1	Cloths Act 1464	A Statute made in the Fourth Year of the Reign of the said King Edward the Fourth.	Whereby it is ordained and established, " That all Manner of Woollen Cloths made in any other Region, brought into this Realm, and set to Sale within any Part of this Realm, shall be forfeit to our Sovereign Lord the King, except Cloths made in Wales and Ireland, and Cloths taken by any of the King's Liege People upon the Sea, without Fraud or Collusion;"
4 Edw. 4. c. 5	Importation Act 1464	A Statute made in the Fourth Year of the Reign of the said King Edward the Fourth.	As relates to the Importation of Merchandize from Brabant, Holland, and Zealand, or from the Dominions of the Duke of Burgundy.
4 Edw. 4. c. 6	Foreign Merchants Act 1464	A Statute made in the Fourth Year of the Reign of the said King Edward the Fourth.	As relates to the Surety to be given by Alien Merchants for employing their Money in Purchase of English Commodities.
12 Edw. 4. c. 2	Bowstaves Act 1472	A Statute made in the Twelfth Year of the Reign of the said King Edward the Fourth.	Whereby it is ordained and established, "That every Merchant, Stranger, and every or any of their Factors, Attornies or Servants, which shall bring or convey into this Land any Merchandize, in Carrack, Galley, or Ship, from the City or Country of Venice, or from any other City, Town or Country, from whence Bow staves had before that time been brought, sent or conveyed into this Land, at every time of their bringing, sending or conveying of any such Merchandizes into this Realm, shall bring, send or convey into this Realm, with the said Merchandizes, in the same Carrack, Galley or Ship, wherein any such Merchandizes shall be brought, sent or conveyed, for every Tuntight or Tun weight of such Merchandizes which shall be contained in any Carrack, Galley or Ship, Four Bow staves;"
12 Edw. 4. c. 2	Bowstaves Act 1472	A Statute made in the Twelfth Year of the Reign of the said King Edward the Fourth.	Whereby any Penalty is imposed, or any Search is authorised with respect to such Bow staves.
17 Edw. 4. c. 1	Currency, etc. Act 1477	A Statute made in the Seventeenth Year of the Reign of the said King Edward the Fourth.	Whereby it is ordained " That every Merchant Alien, and every Victualler and other Stranger, not being Denizen, which shall resort into any Place or Port of the Realm of England or Wales, shall duly employ all the Money to be received by him, within any Part of the said Realm or Wales, upon Merchandizes or other Commodities of this Realm, or without any Fraud, he shall put the same indue Payment to the King's Liege People within this Realm, the same Employment or Payment duly to be proved in manner mentioned in the said recited Statute, upon pain of Forfeiture of all his Goods being within this Realm, and One Year's Imprisonment;"
17 Edw. 4. c. 1	Currency, etc. Act 1477	A Statute made in the Seventeenth Year of the Reign of the said King Edward the Fourth.	As relates to the Recovery of any Penalties or Forfeitures for Offences against so much of the said Statute as is herein before recited.
22 Edw. 4. c. 3	Importation Act 1482	A Statute made in the Twenty second Year of the Reign of the said King Edward the Fourth.	Whereby it is ordained and established, "That no Merchant Stranger nor other Person shall bring into the Realm to be sold, any Corses, Girdles, Ribbands, Laces, Call Silk or Colein Silk Thrown or Wrought, upon pain of Forfeiture of the same or the Value thereof"

Section 2 of the act repealed 43 enactments relating to importation of goods, commerce or navigation, listed in that section.

Citation	Short title	Description	Extent of repeal
1 Ric. 3. c. 9	Aliens Act 1483	An Act made in the First Year of the Reign of King Richard the Third, intituled An Act touching the Merchants of Italy.	The whole act. or so much thereof as shall be in force and unrepealed immediately before the passing of this act.
1 Ric. 3. c. 10	Importations Act 1483	Another Act made in the said First Year of the Reign of King Richard the Third, intituled An Act touching the bringing in of Silk, Laces, Ribbands, &c.	The whole act.
1 Ric. 3. c. 11	Bowstaves Act 1483	Another Act made in the said First Year of the Reign of the said King Richard the Third, intituled An Act touching Bowyers	The whole act.
1 Ric. 3. c. 13	Vessels of Wine, etc. Act 1483	Another Act made in the said First Year of the Reign of King Richard the Third, Wine Vessels. intituled An Act for the Contents of a Butt of Malmsey, or An Act to ascertain the Contents of Vessels of Wine and Oil.	The whole act. (Note: The whole act was repealed by the Weights and Measures Act 1824 (5 Geo. 4. c. 74).)
1 Hen. 7. c. 2	Denizens Act 1485	An Act made in the First Year of the Reign of King Henry the Seventh, intituled An Act that Denizens shall pay Customs and Subsidies.	The whole act.
1 Hen. 7. c. 8	Importation Act 1485	Another Act made in the First Year of the Reign of the said King Henry the Seventh, intituled An Act against bringing in of Gascoigne Wine, except in English, Irish, or Welshmen's Ships.	The whole act.
1 Hen. 7. c. 9	Importation (No. 2) Act 1485	An Act made in the said First Year of the Reign of the said King Henry the Seventh, intituled An Act against Merchant Strangers for bringing into this Realm Girdles, Ribbands, Laces, &c.	The whole act.
3 Hen. 7. c. 8	Alien Merchants Act 1487	An Act made in the Third Year of the Reign of the said King Henry the Seventh, intituled An Act for Confirmation of a Statute made in the Seventeenth Year of Edward the Fourth, against carrying out of this Realm Money for Wares brought into the same.	The whole act, or much of the said Act of the Third Year of the Reign of King Henry the Seventh, as shall be in force and unrepealed immediately before the passing of this act.
4 & 5 Hen. 7. c. 10	Importations, etc. Act 1488	An Act made in the Parliament begun to be holden at Westminster on the Thirteenth Day of January in the Fourth Year of the Reign of the said King Henry the Seventh, intituled An Act against bringing into this Realm Wines in Foreign Bottoms.	The whole act or so much thereof as shall be in force and unrepealed immediately before the passing of this Act.
7 Hen. 7. c. 8 (Note: This is the citation in The Statutes of the Realm.) 7 Hen. 7. c. 7 (Note: This is the citation in The Statutes at Large.)	Customs Act 1491	An Act made in the Seventh Year of the Reign of King Henry the Seventh, intituled An Act to pay Custom for every Butt of Malmsey.	The whole act.
11 Hen. 7. c. 14	Customs (No. 2) Act 1495	An Act made in the Eleventh Year of the Reign of the said King Henry the Seventh, intituled An Act that all Strangers and Denizens shall pay Customs.	The whole act.
11 Hen. 7. c. 17	Game, etc. Act 1495	An Act made in the Eleventh Year of the Reign of the said King Henry the Seventh, intituled An Act against taking of Feasants and Partridges, whereby it is ordained, "That all such Persons that bring any Niesse, Hawk or Hawks from any of the Parts beyond the Sea, bring a Certificate under the Customer's Seal of the Port where he first landed with the said Hawk or Hawks, testifying that the same Hawk or Hawks be of the Parts beyond the Sea, upon pain of Forfeiture of the said Hawk or Hawks to the King."	I.e., section 3.
12 Hen. 7. c. 6	Merchant Adventurers Act 1496	An Act made in the Twelfth Year of the Reign of the said King Henry the Seventh, for Mer- chants Adventurers, or intituled An Act for Merchants Adventurers.	The whole act.
19 Hen. 7. c. 21	Silk Works Act 1503	An Act made in the Nineteenth Year of the Reign of the said King Henry the Seventh, for Sylke Women, or intituled An Act for Silk Women.	The whole act.
19 Hen. 7. c. 23	Hanse Merchants Act 1503	Another Act made in the said Nineteenth Year of the Reign of the said King Henry the Seventh, for the Stillyard, or intituled An Act for the Hanse Merchants.	The whole act.
1 Hen. 8. c. 5	Customs Act 1509	An Act made in the First Year of the Reign of King Henry the Eighth, intituled An Act for the true Payment of the King's Customs.	The whole act.
14 & 15 Hen. 8. c. 4	Customs Act 1523	An Act made in the Fourteenth and Fifteenth Years of the Reign of the said King Henry the Eighth, intituled An Act for Payment of Customs.	The whole act.
22 Hen. 8. c. 8	Customs Act 1530	An Act made in the Twenty second Year of the Reign of the said King Henry the Eighth, intituled An Act for Denizens to pay Strangers Customs.	The whole act.
23 Hen. 8. c. 7	Foreign Wines Act 1531	An Act made in the Twenty third Year of the Reign of the said King Henry the Eighth, intituled An Act that the Statutes made for the Maintenance of the Navy of this Realm shall stand in full Strength, and how Gascoigne and French Wines shall be brought in, and the same and other Wines sold.	The whole act.
25 Hen. 8. c. 9	Pewterers Act 1533	An Act made in the Twenty fifth Year of the Reign of the said King Henry the Eighth, intituled An Act concerning Pewterers.	Whereby it is enacted, "That no Person thereafter, at any Time then inhabiting, or which thereafter should inhabit within this Realm, should buy or otherwise take by ex- change for other Wares, any manner of Wares made out of the Realm, of Tin or mixed with Tin, or any Thing made of Tin or Pewter," as in the said Act is mentioned, upon pain of the Forfeiture in the said Act mentioned. Whereby it is enacted, "That it should be lawful for the War- dens of the Craft of Pewterers and other Officers in the said Act mentioned, to appoint Persons to make Search and Seizure, and to take into their Hands and Possession all such Wares as should be brought contrary to the true Intent and Effect of the said Act, in whosesoever Hands or Possession any such should be found." I.e., sections 1 and 2.
25 Hen. 8. c. 15	Printers and Binders Act 1533	An Act made in the said Twenty fifth Year of the Reign of King Henry the Eighth, intituled An Act for Printers and Binders of Books.	Whereby it is enacted, "That no Person or Persons resiant or inhabitant within the Realm, shall buy to sell again any printed Book brought from any Parts out of the King's Obeisance ready bound in Boards, Leather or Parchment; nor shall buy within the Realm of any Stranger born out of the King's Obeisance, other than of Denizens, any manner of printed Books brought from any the Parts beyond the Sea, except only by Engross and not by Retail, under the Pains and Forfeitures in the said Act mentioned." I.e., sections 2 and 3.
27 Hen. 8. c. 14	Customs Act 1535	An Act made in the Twenty seventh Year of the Reign of the said King Henry the Eighth, An Act concerning the Custom of Leather.	The whole act.
32 Hen. 8. c. 14	Navigation Act 1540	An Act made in the Thirty second Year of the Reign of the said King Henry the Eighth, intituled The Maintenance of the Navy; or An Act for the Maintenance of the Navy of England, and for certain Rates of Freight.	The whole act.
33 Hen. 8. c. 2	Fish Act 1541	An Act made in the Thirty third Year of the Reign of the said King Henry the Eighth, intituled An Act concerning buying of Fish upon the Sea, or The Bill concerning buying of Fish upon the Sea.	The whole act.
33 Hen. 8. c. 4	Pewterers Act 1541	Another Act made in the Thirty third Year of the Reign of the said King Henry the Eighth, intituled An Act concerning Pewterers .	Whereby any Tin Wares, &c. Article, Sentence or Clause, therein and hereinbefore recited, contained in the said hereinbefore recited Act of the Twenty fifth Year of the Reign of the said King Henry the Eighth is made perpetual. Whereby it is enacted, "That no Person or Persons buy or take by Exchange, or otherwise take into or within the Realm, to the Intent to sell any Things or Wares of Tin or Pewter in the said Act rehearsed, made or to be made out of the Realm." Whereby any Penalty or Forfeiture is imposed on any Person or Persons who shall unlawfully withstand, interrupt, disturb or let the Master and Wardens, or their Deputy, of the Craft of Pewterers, or other Officers in the said Act named, in searching, seizing and taking into their Hands and Possession, such Wares as shall happen to be bought or brought into the Realm contrary to the Purport and Effect of the said Act made in the Twenty fifth Year of the Reign of King Henry the Eighth.
2 & 3 Edw. 6. c. 22	Customs Act 1548	An Act made in the Parliament holden in the Second and Third Years of the Reign of King Edward the Sixth, intituled An Act for the colouring Customs in other Men's Names.	The whole act.
5 & 6 Edw. 6. c. 18	Navigation Act 1551	An Act made in the Parliament holden in the Fifth and Sixth Years of the Reign of the said King Edward the Sixth, intituled An Act repealing a Statute made in the Fourth Year of King Henry the Seventh, against the bringing in of Wine and Woad in Strange Bottoms.	The whole act.
1 Eliz. 1. c. 11	Customs Act 1558	An Act made in the First Year of the Reign of Queen Elizabeth, intituled An Act limiting the Times for laying on Land Merchandize from beyond the Seas, and touching Customs for Sweet Wines.	Whereby it is enacted, "That no Person, Denizen ne Stranger, do take upon him to enter, or do or cause to be entered into the Books of any Customers, or other Officer or Officers of any Port or Haven within this Realm, or his or their Deputy or Deputies, Servant or Servants, any manner of Goods, Wares, or Merchandizes whatsoever, coming or brought into the Realm from any Ports beyond the Sea, or going or to be transported out of the Realm into any the Parts beyond the Sea, in the Name or Names of any other Person or Persons than the very true Owner or Owners of the same Goods, Wares, or Merchandizes, upon Pain of Forfeiture of the Value of the Goods so entered." I.e., section 5.
1 Eliz. 1. c. 13	Navigation Act 1558	An Act made in the said First Year of the Reign of Queen Elizabeth, intituled An Act for the shipping in English Bottoms.	The whole act.
5 Eliz. 1. c. 5	Maintenance of the Navy Act 1562	An Act made in the Fifth Year of the Reign of the said Queen Elizabeth, intituled An Act touching politic Constitutions made for the Maintenance of the Navy. Whereby it is enacted, "That it shall not be lawful to any Person or Persons to buy of any Stranger, or out of any Stranger's Bottom, any Herring being not sufficiently salted, packed, and casked." Whereby it is enacted, "That all English Hoys and Plats may cross the Seas as far as Caen in Normandy, and eastward as far as Norway." Whereby it is enacted, "That it shall not be lawful to any Person or Persons to bring into the Realm any Cod or Lings in Barrels or other Casks, but loose in Bulk and by tale, to be sold within the Realm." Whereby it is enacted, "That no Person or Persons whatsoever shall bring into the Realm of England, or any Part of the same, any Wine coming out of any of the Dominions or Countries belonging to the Crown of France, or any Woad called Thoulouse Woad, in any other Vessel or Vessels, but only in such Vessel and Vessels whereof some Subject or Subjects of the Queen's Majesty, her Heirs or Successors, shall be then only Owner or Part Owner."	I.e., section 5, 6, 7 and 8.
13 Eliz. 1. c. 2	Bulls, etc., from Rome Act 1571	An Act made in the Thirteenth Year of the Reign of the said Queen Elizabeth, intituled An Act against the bringing in and putting in Execution of Bulls and other Instruments from the See of Rome.	Whereby any Danger, Penalty, Pain or Forfeiture maybe incurred by or inflicted upon any Person or Persons who shall bring into the Realm of England, or any of the Dominions of the same, any Token or Tokens, or Thing or Things called or named by the Name of an Agnus Dei, or any Crosses, Pictures, Beads or such like vain and superstitious Things, from the Bishop or See of Rome, or from any Person or Persons authorized or claiming Authority by or from the said Bishop or See of Rome to consecrate or hallow the same; or by or upon any Person or Persons so bringing in as is aforesaid such Agnus Dei and other Things before specified, who shall deliver, or cause or offer to be delivered, the same or any of them, to any Subject of the Realm, or of any Dominions of the same, to be worn or used in any wise. I.e., section 4
13 Eliz. 1. c. 11	Navigation Act 1571	An Act made in the said Thirteenth Year of the Reign of the said Queen Elizabeth, intituled An Act for the Maintenance of the Navigation.	The whole act. (Note: The whole act was repealed by the Weights and Measures Act 1824 (5 Geo. 4. c. 74).)
13 Eliz. 1. c. 14	Importation Act 1571	Another Act made in the said Thirteenth Year of the Reign of the said Queen Elizabeth, intituled An Act for the bringing of Bow Staves into this Realm.	The whole act.
13 Eliz. 1. c. 15	Hoys Act 1571	Another Act made in the said Thirteenth Year of the Reign of the said Queen Elizabeth, intituled An Act that no Hoy or Plat across the Seas.	The whole act.
23 Eliz. 1. c. 7	Navigation Act 1580	An Act made in the Twenty third Year of the Reign of the said Queen Elizabeth, intituled An Act for the Increase of Mariners, and for the Maintenance of Navigation.	The whole act.
27 Eliz. 1. c. 15	Importation Act 1584	An Act made in the Twenty seventh Year of the Reign of Queen Elizabeth, intituled An Act for bringing in of Staple Fish and Herrings into this Realm.	The whole act.
28 Eliz. 1. c. 4 (I)	N/A	An Act made in the Parliament of Ireland, in the Twenty eighth Year of the Reign of Queen Elizabeth, intituled An Act of Impost and Custom of Wines.	The whole act.
39 Eliz. 1. c. 10	Navigation Act 1597	An Act made in the Thirty ninth Year of the Reign of the said Queen Elizabeth, intituled An Act for the Increase of Mariners and Maintenance of the Navigation, repealing a Statute made in the Twenty third Year of Her Majesty's Reign, bearing the same Title.	The whole act.
1 Jas. 1. c. 18	Hops Act 1603	An Act made in the First Year of the Reign of King James the First, intituled An Act for avoiding of deceitful selling, buying or spending corrupt and unwholesome Hops, whereby it is enacted, "That if any Foreigner, Stranger, Native Englishman, Denizen, Merchant or any other Person or Persons whomsoever, do bring or cause to be brought into England, from any foreign Realm or Dominion beyond the Sea, any Hops being deceitfully or corruptly unclean, corrupt or mixed with any Powder, Dust, Dross, Sand or any other Soil whatever, that every Person so offending, shall forfeit the same Hops so brought into the Realm."	I.e., section 1.
3 Jas. 1. c. 5	Presentation of Benefices Act 1605	An Act made in the Third Year of the Reign of the said King James the First, intituled An Act to prevent and avoid Dangers which may grow by Popish Recosants.	Whereby it is enacted, "That no Person or Persons shall bring from beyond the Seas, nor shall print, sell or buy any Popish Primers, Ladies' Psalters, Manuells, Rosaries, Popish Catechisms, Missals, Breviaries, Portals, Legends and Lives of Saints, containing superstitious Matters, printed or written in any Language whatsoever, nor any other superstitious Books printed or written in the English Tongue, upon pain of Forfeiture of Forty Shillings for every such Book."
3 Jas. 1. c. 6	Foreign Trade Act 1605	An Act made in the said Third Year of the Reign of the said King James the First, intituled An Act to enable all His Majesty's loving Subjects of England and Wales, to trade freely into the Dominions of Spain, Portugal and France.	The whole act.
16 Cha. 1. c. 21	Gunpowder Act 1640	An Act made in the Sixteenth Year of the Reign of King Charles the First, intituled An Act for the free bringing in of Gunpowder and Saltpetre from foreign Parts, and for the free making of Gunpowder in this Realm, whereby it is declared and enacted, "That it shall and may be lawful to and for all and singular Persons, as well Strangers as natural born Subjects of this Realm, to import and bring into the Kingdom any Quantities of Gunpowder whatsoever, paying such Customs and Duties for the same, as by Authority of Parliament shall be limited and set down."	The whole act. (Note: The whole act was repealed by the Statute Law Revision Act 1863 (26 & 27 Vict. c. 105). The note to that act states: "Sect. 1. repealed by 3 Geo.4. c.41. s. 2. Residue virtually repealed in part by 16 & 17 Vict. c. 107. s. 45., and, so far as not so repealed, unnecessary.")

Section 3 of the act repealed 23 enactments related to the exportation of goods, wares and merchandize, listed in that section.

Citation	Short title	Description	Extent of repeal
27 Edw. 1 Statutum de falsa Moneta	Statutum de falsa Moneta	A Statute made in the Twenty seventh Year of the Reign of King Edward the First, concerning False Money, whereby it is ordained, "That no good Money of Silver of the King's Coin or any other, nor any Silver in Plate or otherwise, shall go or be carried forth of the Realm, nor out of the King's Jurisdiction into Foreign Parts, without the King's Special Licence."	The whole act.
9 Edw. 3. Stat. 1. c. 1	Foreign and other merchants	A Statute made in the Ninth Year of the Reign of King Edward the Third.	Whereby it is provided, "That Merchants Aliens shall carry no Wine out of the Realm."
11 Edw. 3. c. 1	Wool Act 1337	A Statute made in the Eleventh Year of the Reign of the said King Edward the Third, whereby it is accorded, "That no Merchant Foreign or Denizen, nor none other of what Estate or Condition that he be, upon pain of Forfeiture of Life and Member, and of as much as he may forfeit towards the King, shall carry or cause to be carried, by himself nor by other, privily nor openly, any Wools to any Place out of the Realm, till by the King and His Council it be thereof otherwise provided."	The whole act.
14 Edw. 3. Stat. 1. c. 21	Taxation, etc.	A Statute made in the Fourteenth Year of the Reign of the said King Edward the Third.	Whereby it is granted or provided, "That every Man that shippeth Wools over the Sea, Englishman or other, resiant, inhabiting, or repairing in England, shall find good and sufficient Surety to the Customers, to bring again of every Sack of Wool, Plate of Silver to the Value of Two Marks, at his first Return or Repairing, or within the Three Months after the Wools so shipped shall pass out of the Port, and to bring the same Plate to the King's Exchange, and there to receive his Money."
27 Edw. 3. Stat. 2. c. 3	Ordinance of the Staples 1353	The Statute or Ordinance of the Staples, made in the Twenty seventh Year of the Reign of the said King Edward the Third.	Whereby it is granted or provided, "That no Merchant, English, Welsh, nor Irish, shall carry any manner of Wools, Leather, Woolfells or Lead Wools, &c. by out of the King's Realm and Lands." So much of the said Statute or Ordinance as relates to any Covin or Collusion, Fraud or Deceit, with respect to the carrying out the said Wares and Merchandizes, or to the receiving Payment for the Sale thereof, by or on Behalf of such Merchants; or so much and such Parts of the said Statute or Ordinance as are in force or effect relating to such Exportation immediately before the passing of this act.
28 Edw. 3. c. 5	Exportation of iron	A Statute made in the Twenty eighth Year of the Reign of the said King Edward the Third.	Whereby it is accorded and established, "That Iron made in England, and Iron brought into England and there sold, shall not be carried out of the said Realm of England, upon pain of forfeiting the Double to the King."
36 Edw. 3. Stat. 1. c. 11	Customs, exportation	A Statute made in the Thirty sixth Year of the Reign of the said King Edward the Third, whereby it is granted or provided, "That the Merchants Denizens may pass with their Wools, as well as Foreigners, without being restrained."	The whole act.
43 Edw. 3. c. 1	The staple	A Statute made in the Forty third Year of the Reign of the said King Edward the Third, whereby it is ordained or provided, "That Wools, Leather, Woolfells and all other Wools, may be carried out of the Realm by Aliens, to what Part shall please them, at their Wills, and not by Denizens."	The whole act.
50 & 51 Edw. 3. c. 7	Cloth	A Statute made in the Fiftieth Year of the Reign of the said King Edward the Third, whereby it is ordained, "That no Cloths not Woollen Cloths shall be carried out of any Part of the Realm of England before they be fulled."	The whole act.
14 Ric. 2. c. 5	Trading	A Statute made in Fourteenth Year of the Reign of King Richard the Second, whereby it is ordained and established, "That no Denizen carry Wools, Leather, Woolfells nor Lead out of the Realm of England, to the Parts beyond the Sea, upon pain of Forfeiture of the same, but only Strangers."	The whole act.
16 Ric. 2. c. 1	Trade Act 1392	A Statute made in the Sixteenth Year of the Reign of the said King Richard the Second, whereby it is ordained and assented, "That no manner of Spicery, after that it be brought into the Realm, shall be carried out of the same Realm, by Alien or Denizen, upon pain of Forfeiture of the same."	The whole act.
17 Ric. 2. c. 3	Exportation of worsted	A Statute made in the Seventeenth Year of the Reign of the said King Richard the Second, whereby it is ordained and established, "That the Merchants or Workers of Cloths called Single Worsted, may carry Bolts of Single Worsted to what Parts they will, except to the King's Enemies; provided, that under the Colour of the said Bolts of Single Worsted, they shall carry no Double Worsteds nor Half Double, no Worsteds Ray nor Motley, upon pain of Forfeiture of the same."	The whole act.
4 Hen. 4. c. 16	Exportation of gold and silver	A Statute made in the Fourth Year of the Reign of King Henry the Fourth, as relates to the Confirmation of any former Ordinances and Statutes prohibiting the sending or carrying out of the Realm of any Money, or Gold or Silver in Money, Plate or Vessel, or to any Forfeiture for the same.	The whole act.
6 Hen. 4. c. 4	Exportation	A Statute made in the Sixth Year of the Reign of the said King Henry the Fourth.	Whereby it is provided, "That Merchants Aliens and Strangers shall not carry or cause to be carried out of the Realm any Merchandizes brought within the Realm by Merchants Aliens and Strangers."
8 Hen. 5. c. 2	Gold and Silver	A Statute made in the Eighth Year of the Reign of King Henry the Fifth, whereby it is ordained and established, "That every Merchant Stranger buying Wools in England to carry them to the West Parts or elsewhere, not coming to the Staple there to be sold shall bring to the Master of the Mint of the Tower of London, of every Sack, One Ounce of Bullion of Gold, and in the same manner of Three Pieces of Tin, One Ounce of Bullion of Gold, or the Value in Bullion of Silver, upon pain of Forfeiture of the same Wools and Tin, or the Value of the same to the King."	The whole act.
3 Hen. 6. c. 2	Exportation of Sheep	A Statute made in the Third Year of the Reign of King Henry the Sixth, whereby it is ordained and granted, "That no manner of Person, of what Estate or Condition that he be, be suffered to ship or cause to be shipped within the Realm of England, any Sheep fleeced or shorn, into the Country of Flanders, or to any other Parts beyond the Sea."	The whole act.
3 Hen. 6. c. 4	Exportation of Butter, etc.	The said Statute made in the Third Year of the Reign of King Henry the Sixth, as relates to the exporting of Butter and Cheese.	The whole act.
8 Hen. 6. c. 23	Exportation	A Statute made in the Eighth Year of the Reign of the said King Henry the Sixth, whereby it is ordained, "That no Man shall carry or convey out of the Realm, any manner of Thrums, nor Threads of Wool called Woollen Yarn, under colour of Thrums, upon pain to forfeit the Double Value of the same."	The whole act.
18 Hen. 6. c. 3	Exportation	A Statute made in the Eighteenth Year of the Reign of the said King Henry the Sixth, whereby it is ordained, "That the King's liege People may convey and carry out of this Realm, whither it shall please them, of the King's Amity, Cheese and Butter, without any Licence to be sued in anywise, any Statute made to the contrary notwithstanding : Provided that the King may restrain the same when it shall please him."	The whole act.
23 Hen. 6. c. 2	Exportation	A Statute made in the Twenty third Year of the Reign of the said King Henry the Sixth, whereby it is ordained, "That no Man shall pack nor ship any Thrums nor Woollen Yarn, in any wise to be had, or to pass out of England beyond the Sea, upon the Penalties and Forfeitures in the said Statute mentioned and contained."	The whole act.
3 Edw. 4. c. 1	Exportation Act 1463	A Statute made in the Third Year of the Reign of King Edward the Fourth.	As in any manner relates to or concerns the buying or selling any manner of Wools or Woolfells, Morling or Shorling, within any Part of the Realm; or to the shipping, carrying or exporting of any Wools, Woolfells, Morling or Shorling, at or from any Place within the Realm to any Place out of the Realm, by any Alien or Stranger, or by any Denizen, or any other the King's Subjects; or as imposes any Penalty or Forfeiture with respect to any such buying, selling, shipping, carrying or exporting of any such Wool, Woolfells, Morling or Shorling respectively.
7 & 8 Edw. 4. c. 3	Export of Cloths Act 1467	A Statute, made in the Seventh Year of the Reign of the said King Edward the Fourth.	Whereby it is ordained and established, "That no Person, Denizen or Stranger, shall carry or cause to be carried into any Parts beyond the Sea, any Woollen Yarn or Cloth, not fulled, upon the Penalties and Forfeitures in the said Act mentioned."
17 Edw. 4. c. 1	Currency, etc. Act 1477	A Statute made in the Seventeenth Year of the Reign of the said King Edward the Fourth.	Whereby it is ordained that no Person shall carry or cause to be carried out of the Realm any manner of Money of the Coin of the Realm, nor Money of the Coin of any other Realms, Lands or Seignories, nor no Plate, Vessel, Mass, Bullion nor Jewels of Gold, wrought or unwrought, or of Silver, without the King's Licence, upon Pain of Felony

Section 4 of the act repealed 31 enactments related to the exportation of goods, wares and merchandize, listed in that section.

Citation	Short title	Description	Extent of repeal
3 Hen. 7. c. 11	Exportation Act 1487	An Act made in the Third Year of the Reign of King Henry the Seventh, intituled An Act that no Stranger or Denizen shall carry any Woollen Cloths out of this Realm before they be barbed, rowed and shorne.	The whole act.
11 Hen. 7. c. 13	Exportation Act 1495	An Act made in the Eleventh Year of the Reign of the said King Henry the Seventh, intituled An Act against transporting of Horses and Mares beyond the Seas.	The whole act.
3 Hen. 8. c. 3	Archery Act 1511	An Act made in the Third Year of the Reign of King Henry the Eighth, intituled, An Act concerning shooting in Long Bows, whereby it is enacted or provided, "That no Stranger born out of the King's Obeysance, not being Denizen, shall not convey, nor do to be conveyed into any Parts out of the King's Obeysance, any Long Bows, Arrows or Shafts, without the King's especial Licence, upon pain of Forfeiture of the same, and upon pain of Imprisonment."	I.e., section 4.
3 Hen. 8. c. 7	Exportation Act 1511	An Act made in the Third Year of the Reign of King Henry the Eighth, intituled An Act against carrying Cloths over Sea unshorn.	The whole act.
13 Hen. 8. c. 2. (I)	N/A	Two Acts made in the Parliament of Ireland, in the Thirteenth and Twenty eighth Years of the Reign of King Henry the Eighth, to prevent the lading or exporting of Wools and Flocks.	The whole act.
28 Hen. 8. c. 17 (I)	N/A	Two Acts made in the Parliament of Ireland, in the Thirteenth and Twenty eighth Years of the Reign of King Henry the Eighth, to prevent the lading or exporting of Wools and Flocks.	The whole act.
14 & 15 Hen. 8. c. 1	Cloths Act 1523	An Act made in the Parliament holden in the Fourteenth and Fifteenth Years of the Reign of the said King Henry the Eighth, intituled The Act concerning the conveying, transporting and carrying of Broad White Woollen Cloths out of this Realm.	The whole act.
14 & 15 Hen. 8. c. 3	Worsteds (Great Yarmouth) Act 1523	An Act made in the Parliament holden in the said Fourteenth and Fifteenth Years of the Reign of the said King Henry the Eighth, intituled The Act concerning the Dressing of Worsteads Sayes and Stamins, for the Town of Great Yarmouth.	Whereby it is enacted, "That no Person or Persons convey or transport into any of the Parts beyond the Sea, any manner of Cloths of Worsteds before the same Cloths be shorn, dyed, coloured and calendred, upon pain of forfeiting the Value thereof." I.e., section 12.
21 Hen. 8. c. 10	Exportation Act 1529	The whole of an Act made in the Twenty first Year of the Reign the said King Henry the Eighth, intituled An Act against the carrying of Latten Brass and such Metal mixed, beyond the Sea.	The whole act.
22 Hen. 8. c. 7	Exportation Act 1530	An Act made in the Twenty second Year of the Reign of the said King Henry the Eighth, intituled An Act against Conveyance of Horses out of this Realm.	The whole act.
25 Hen. 8. c. 2	Price of Victuals Act 1533	An Act made in the Twenty fifth Year of the Reign of the said King Henry the Eighth, intituled An Act of Proclamation to be made concerning Victuals.	Whereby it is enacted, "That no Person or Persons, unless it be by Licence under the King's Great Seal, shall carry or convey, or cause to be carried or conveyed, any Beef, Mutton, Veal, Pork or any other Victuals in the said Act mentioned, to any Ports beyond the Seas, except as in the said Act is excepted."
26 Hen. 8. c. 16	Worsteds (Norwich, Lynn, and Yarmouth) Act 1534	An Act made in the Twenty sixth Year of the Reign of the said King Henry the Eighth, intituled An Act for making of Worsteds in the City of Norwich, and in the Towns of Lyn and Yarmouth.	Whereby so much as is hereinbefore recited of the Act made in the Fourteenth and Fifteenth Years of the said King Henry the Eighth, (Note: Worsteds (Great Yarmouth) Act 1523 (14 & 15 Hen. 8. c. 3)) concerning the Dressing of Worsted Sayes and Stamins for the Town of Great Yarmouth is made perpetual.
27 Hen. 8. c. 14	Customs Act 1535	Another Act made in the Twenty seventh Year of the Reign of King Henry the Eighth, intituled An Act concerning the Custom of Leather.	The whole act.
33 Hen. 8. c. 7	Exportation Act 1541	An Act made in the Thirty third Year of the Reign of the said King Henry the Eighth, intituled An Act concerning the Conveyance of Brass, Latten and Bell Metal over the Sea.	The whole act. (Note: The whole act had already been repealed by the Exportation (No. 5) Act 1813 (53 Geo. 3)
33 Hen. 8. c. 9	Unlawful Games Act 1541	Another Act made in the said Thirty third Year of the Reign of the said King Henry the Eighth, intituled An Act for Maintenance of Artillery and debarring of unlawful Games.	Whereby it is enacted, "That no Stranger born out of the King's Obeysance not being Denizen, shall convey or do to be conveyed, give, sell or exchange into any Parts out of the King's Obeysance, any Long Bows, Arrows or Shafts, without the King's especial Licence, upon pain of Forfeiture of the same and of Imprisonment." I.e., section 7.
33 Hen. 8. c. 16	Worsted Yarn Act 1541	An Act made in the said Thirty third Year of the Reign of the said King Henry the Eighth, intituled An Act for Worsted Yarn in Norfolk.	Whereby any Penalty or Forfeiture is imposed on any Person or Persons who ship to carry or convey into the Parts beyond the Sea, any Yarn called Worsted Yarn, not wrought or made in Cloth, so such Yarn be spun or made within the Realm of England. I.e., section 2.
1 Edw. 6. c. 5	Exportation Act 1547	An Act made in the First Year of the Reign of King Edward the Sixth, intituled An Act that no Horses shall be conveyed out of this Realm and other the King's Dominions, without Licence, or so much thereof as shall be in force immediately before the passing of this.	The whole act.
1 Edw. 6. c. 6	Worsted Yarn Act 1547	An Act made in the said First Year of the Reign of the said King Edward the Sixth, intituled An Act for the Continuance of making of Worsted Yarn in Norfolk.	Whereby so much of the Act made in the Thirty third Year of the Reign of King Henry the Eighth, intituled An Act for Worsted Yarn in Norfolk, (Note: Worsted Yarn Act 1541 (33 Hen. 8. c. 16)) as is hereinbefore recited and set forth, is enacted to continue for ever. I.e., section 2.
2 & 3 Edw. 6. c. 37	Exportation (No. 2) Act 1548	An Act made in the Parliament holden in the Second and Third Years of the Reign of King Edward the Sixth, intituled An Act for carrying of Bell Metal out of the Realm, or An Act against the carrying of Bell Metal out of the Realm.	The whole act. (Note: The whole act had already been repealed by the Exportation (No. 5) Act 1813 (53 Geo. 3)
5 & 6 Edw. 6. c. 15	Regratours of Tanned Leather Act 1551	An Act made in the Parliament holden in the Fifth and Sixth Years of the Reign of the said King Edward the Sixth, intituled An Act against Regrators of tanned Leather.	Whereby it is enacted, "That no Person or Persons shall ship or cause to be shipped (to the Intent to carry, transport or convey over the Sea, as Merchandize to be sold or exchanged there), any Shoes, Boots, Buskins, Stertups or Slippers, upon pain to forfeit the same or the Value thereof." I.e., section 5.
1 Mar. Sess. 3. c. 8	Leather Act 1554	An Act made in the Parliament begun to be holden at Westminster, on the Second Day of April, in the First Year of the Reign of Queen Mary, intituled An Act touching the buying and currying of Leather.	Whereby it is enacted or provided, That Curriers, Shoemakers and Girdlers, nor any Person for them or for their Use, shall buy any Kind of tanned Leather to sell again to any Merchant or other Stranger to be conveyed over the Sea, nor shall send nor convey any Leather beyond the Sea, upon the Forfeiture of all such Leather so brought." I.e., section 1.
1 & 2 Ph. & M. c. 5	Exportation Act 1554	An Act made in the Parliament holden in the First and Second Years of the Reign of King Philip and Queen Mary, intituled An Act to restrain carrying of Corn, Victuals and Wood over the Sea.	So far as the same relates to Victuals and Wood.
5 Eliz. 1. c. 22	Exportation (No. 2) Act 1562	An Act made in the Fifth Year of the Reign of Queen Elizabeth, intituled An Act against carrying of Sheep Skins and Pelts over the Sea, not being Staple Ware.	The whole act or so much of the said act as shall be in force immediately before the passing of this act.
8 Eliz. 1. c. 3	Exportation Act 1566	An Act made in the Eighth Year of the Reign of the said Queen Elizabeth, intituled An Act against carrying over Sea, Rams, Lambs and other Sheep alive.	The whole act.
8 Eliz. 1. c. 6	Exportation (No. 2) Act 1566	Another Act made in the said Eighth Year of the Reign of Queen Elizabeth, intituled An Act touching Cloth Workers and Cloths ready wrought to be shipped over the Sea.	The whole act.
11 Eliz. 1 Sess. 3. c. 10 (I)	N/A	An Act made in the Parliament of Ireland, in the Eleventh Year of the Reign of Queen Elizabeth, intituled An Act for the staying of Wool Flocks and Tallow, and other Necessaries within this Realm.	The whole act.
13 Eliz. 1. c. 4 (I) (Note: Incorrectly cited as "13 Eliz. 1. c. 2" in the act.)	N/A	An Act made in the said Parliament, in the Thirteenth Year of Queen Elizabeth, for explaining the said Acts of the Eleventh Year of Queen Elizabeth.	The whole act. (Note: The whole act was repealed by the Statute Law Revision (Ireland) Act 1878 (41 & 42 Vict. c. 57).)
18 Eliz. 1. c. 9	Exportation Act 1575	An Act made in the Eighteenth Year of the said Queen Elizabeth, intituled An Act against the transporting of Leather, Tallow and Raw Hides out of the Realm.	The whole act.
35 Eliz. 1. c. 11	Clapboard Act 1592	An Act made in the Thirty fifth Year of the Reign of the said Queen Elizabeth, intituled An Act for the bringing in Clap Board from the Parts of beyond the Seas, and the restraining of transporting of Wine Casks for the sparing and preserving of Timber within this Realm.	The whole act.
3 Jas. 1. c. 9	Skinners Act 1605	An Act made in the Third Year of the Reign of King James the First, intituled An Act for the Relief of such as lawfully use the Trade and Handicraft of Skinners.	Whereby it is enacted, "That no Person or Persons shall transport or carry beyond the Seas, nor cause to be transported or carried beyond the Seas, nor shall pack, ship or lade to the Intent to transport or carry beyond the Seas, any Black Coney Skins of the Breed of this Realm, unless the same Skins shall first be tanned, and duly and perfectly wrought, dressed and packed within this Realm, by those that are Artizans, Skinners or Tanners unto the said Artizans Skinners, according to the Science, Art and Faculty of the said Artizans Skinners, upon pain of Forfeiture of such Skins or the Value thereof." I.e., section 1.
3 Jas. 1. c. 11	Exportation Act 1605	Another Act made in the said Third Year of the Reign of the said King James the First, intituled An Act for the Transportation of Beer over the Sea.	The whole act.

Section 5 of the act repealed 43 enactments related to staples, listed in that section.

Citation	Short title	Description	Extent of repeal
27 Edw. 3. Stat. 2	Ordinance of the Staples 1353	A Statute or Ordinance made in the Twenty seventh Year of the Reign of King Edward the Third, intituled or known by the Name of The Statute of the Staple, or The Ordinance of the Staples, or by whatever Name, Title or Description the said Statute or Ordinance may have been or may be known, intituled or described.	Except only so far as is hereinafter specially excepted and provided for, as shall be in force and unrepealed immediately before the passing of this act.
27 Edw. 3. Stat. 2	Ordin. de feodis Majorum (Fees of mayors, etc. of staples)	An Ordinance made in the said Twenty seventh Year (or in the Twenty eighth Year) of the Reign of the said King Edward the Third, concerning the Sums to be paid to the Mayors and Constables of the Staples for their Services.	The whole act or as shall be in force and unrepealed immediately before the passing of this act.
28 Edw. 3. c. 13	Confirmation, etc., of 27 Ed. 3. St. 2 Act 1354	A Statute made in the Twenty eighth Year of the Reign of the said King Edward the Third.	Whereby it is accorded and established, "That all the Ordinances made in the great Council holden at Westminster, the Monday next after the Feast of Saint Mattheu the Apostle, then last past, together with certain Declarations and Additions made in the Parliament of the said Twenty eighth Year, should be firmly kept and holden for a Statute to endure for ever."
28 Edw. 3. c. 13	Confirmation, etc., of 27 Ed. 3. St. 2 Act 1354	The said Statute made in the Twenty eighth Year of the Reign of the said King Edward the Third.	Whereby it is accorded and established, "That the Warranty of packing of Wools shall wholly be out, and that no Man be holden to make such Warranty, unless it is by a Covenant made by Deed ensealed; and that no Man other than a Merchant Denizen or Alien, shall be charged by the Laws and Usages of the Staple until they be declared in Parliament."
28 Edw. 3. c. 14	The staple	The said last mentioned Statute.	As relates to the showing of Wools at Showing of the Staple, or within Three Miles about the Staple; or to the bounds of the Staple of Westminster, or in other Cities or Towns.
31 Edw. 3. Stat. 1. c. 7	The Statute of Labourers, the staple	A Statute made in the Thirty first Year of the Bounds of the Reign of the said King Edward the Third.	Whereby it is accorded and established, "That the King assign his Justices to enquire, hear and determine of those that have carried Wools, Leather and Woolfells to the Parts beyond the Seas, and thereof have made Covin and Excess, and otherwise attempted against the Ordinances and the Form of the Statute of the Staple."
31 Edw. 3. Stat. 1. c. 8	Wool	The said last mentioned Statute.	As relates to the Exportation of Wools, Leather and Woolfells, and to the Refuse of Wools, and to the bringing Wools, Fells and Leather to the Staple, or to the Ports ordained for the Staple, or to the lodging, showing or selling of Wools within Three Miles of the Staple, or to the prolonging the Term for Exportation of Wools.
31 Edw. 3. Stat. 1. c. 9	Wool	The said last mentioned Statute.	The whole act.
36 Edw. 3. c. 7	The staple	A Statute made in the Thirty sixth Year of the Reign of the said King Edward the Third.	As relates to the Cognizance of Debts, Covenants and Power of Contracts, and other Pleas touching Merchandize, before Mayors and Constables of the Staples, and to the Suing by Merchants Aliens of their Plaints and Quarrels before the Mayor of the Staple, and to the Power of the Mayor of the Staple to take Recognizances of Debt.
38 Edw. 3. Stat. 1. c. 7	N/A	A Statute made in the Thirty eighth Year of the Reign of the said King Edward the Third, (Note: Ordinance of the Staples 1353 (27 Edw. 3. Stat. 2)) whereby it confirming is accorded and assented, "That the Staple shall be in England, and that the Statute of the Staple made in the Seven and twentieth Year of the Reign of the said King Edward the Third, with the Declarations, Additions and Modifications thereof made, be holden and kept, notwithstanding any Grant, Licence or other Statute or Ordinance made afterward."	The whole act.
43 Edw. 3. c. 1	The staple	A Statute made in the Forty third Year of the Reign of the said King Edward the Third, as relates to abolishing the Staple at Calais, and as directs that the Staple of Wools, Woolfells and Leather shall be holden in certain Places in England, Wales and Ireland; and as relates to the weighing, sealing, cocketing and customing of Wools, Woolfells and Leather at the said Staples, before the said Wools, Woolfells or Leather shall pass out of the Realm, and as relates to the carrying Wools, Woolfells and Leather out of the Realm by Aliens and not by Denizens, and as imposes or inflicts any Forfeiture or Penalty on such Exportation by Denizens.	The whole act.
2 Ric. 2. Stat. 1. c. 1	Merchants	A Statute made in the Parliament holden at Gloucester, in the Second Year of the Reign of King Richard the Second.	Whereby any Saving is made for the Ordinances made before that Time of the Staple of Calais, to be holden in their Force and Virtue.
2 Ric. 2. Stat. 1. c. 3	Merchants	The said last mentioned Statute as relates to Merchants of Genoa, Venice, Catalonia, Arragon, and of other Lands, Realms and Countries towards the West, carrying Wools, Leather, Woolfells, Lead, Tin and other Merchandizes of the Staple, into their Country towards the West, paying the Customs, Subsidies and Duties, and finding the Surety in the said Act mentioned.	The whole act.
12 Ric. 2. c. 16	The staple	A Statute made in the Twelfth Year of the Reign of King Richard the Second, whereby it is ordained and assented, "That the Staple be removed from Middleburgh to Calais."	The whole act.
14 Ric. 2. c. 1	The staple	A Statute made in the Fourteenth Year of the Reign of King Richard the Second, whereby it is ordained and established, "That the Staple be removed from Calais into England, and that it be holden in the Places contained in the Statute of the Staple, made in the Seven and twentieth Year of the said King's Grandfather, and in none other Places; and that the said Statute be holden and kept, and duly executed in all Points, with the Additions in the said Statute of the Fourteenth Year of King Richard the Second, notwithstanding any Declaration or Statute made to the contrary."	The whole act.
14 Ric. 2. c. 3	The staple	The said Statute of the Fourteenth Year of the Reign of King Richard the Second, whereby it is ordained and established, "That in every Port and Place where the Staple shall be, the Mayors, Constables, Brokers and all other Officers and Ministers of the Staple, shall be sworn, first to the King, and afterwards to the Staple."	The whole act.
14 Ric. 2. c. 5	Trading	The she said last mentioned Statute, whereby it is ordained and established, "That no Denizen carry Wools, Leather, Woolfells, nor Lead, out of the Realm of England to the Parts beyond the Sea, upon Pain of Forfeiture of the same, but only Strangers."	The whole act.
15 Ric. 2. c. 9	The staple	The said last mentioned Statute as relates to Recognizances of Debts made before, or taken or received by any Mayor of the Staple, and to any Penalty in respect of such Recognizance taken contrary to the Statute of the Staple.	The whole act. (Note: This act was saved from repeal by section 7 of the act.)
21 Ric. 2. c. 17	N/A	A Statute made in the Twenty first Year of the Reign of the said King Richard the Second as relates to the Exportation of Wools, Leather, Woolfells, Tin and Lead, to any other Place than to the Staple at Calais.	The whole act. (Note: This act was already repealed by 1 Hen. 4 c. 3.)
2 Hen. 5. Stat. 2. c. 6	Staple	A Statute made in the Second Year of the Reign of King Henry the Sixth whereby it was ordained and established, "That any Statutes or Ordinances relating to the Staple at Calais, before then made and not repealed, should be holden and kept and put in due Execution, and that the whole Repair of Wools, Woolfells, Leather, Lead, Tin whole or molten, called Shotten Tin, and all other Merchandizes pertaining to the Staple, passing out of the Realm of England and of the Countries of Wales and Ireland, should be at the said Place of Calais, and at none other Place beyond the Sea, as long as the said Staple should be at the Town of Calais, upon Pain of Forfeiture of the very Value of the Merchandizes which should pass else where but to the Parts towards the West named in the said Statutes thereof made."	The whole act.
2 Hen. 6. c. 4	Staple	The said last mentioned Statute.	As relates to Licences for the Shipping of Wools, Fells and Leather of Northumberland, Westmorland, Cumberland and the Bishopric of Durham.
2 Hen. 6. c. 5	Exportation of Wools	The said last mentioned Statute, whereby it is ordained and established, "That if any Person carry, or cause to be carried, any Wools or Woolfells not customed out of the Realm to other Places than to the Staple of Calais, he shall forfeit to the King the Value of the Merchandizes so shipped, and his Body to Prison till he hath made and paid a Fine and Ransom; and that he hath giveth Knowledge to the Treasurer of England for the Time being, and the Trespasser for the same duly convict, shall have the Fourth Part of the Forfeiture due to the King in this Behalf."	The whole act.
3 Hen. 6. c. 4	Exportation of Butter, etc.	The Statute made in the Third Year of the Reign of the said King Henry the Sixth, whereby it is ordained and established, "That he that will carry Butter and Cheese to any other Parts than to the Staple at Calais, shall sue to the Chancellor of England for the Time being, to have a Licence in this Behalf; and that the same Chancellor have Power to make to him such Licences under the King's Great Seal, if it like him so to do by his Discretion."	The whole act.
6 Hen. 6. c. 6	Wool	A Statute made in the Sixth Year of the Reign of the said King Henry the Sixth.	Whereby it is ordained, "That every Merchant, as well Denizen as Alien, may freely and safely ship Wools, Leather, Woolfells and other Merchandizes of the Staple, in the Port of Melcombe in the County of Dorset, and from thence carry them to the Staple of Calais, paying the Customs and Subsidies due to the King."
8 Hen. 6. c. 17	The staple	A Statute made in the Eighth Year of the Reign of the said King Henry the Sixth, whereby it is ordained, "That no Person ship, nor do to be shipped, no manner of Wools, Woolfells, Leather, Lead nor Tin, whole nor shotten, nor the same carry nor convey to none other Parts beyond the Sea, but only to the Staple of Calais." and whereby any Forfeiture or Penalty is imposed or inflicted, or made payable in respect of Merchandizes carried or conveyed contrary to the ordaining of the said Statutes.	The whole act.
8 Hen. 6. c. 18	The staple	The said last mentioned Statute as relates to the Sale of Wools, Woolfells and Tin at the Staple of Calais, and the Payment for the same and the bringing Bullion to the Mint there, and the Partition of the Money for Wools and Woolfells sold there, and the Acquittances to Merchants Buyers.	The whole act.
8 Hen. 6. c. 20	Trade with Calais Act 1429	The said last mentioned Statute, whereby it is ordained, "That no Merchant continually inhabiting within the Town of Calais, shall be suffered to buy beyond the Sea, any Manner of Wools, Woolfells, Leather, Lead nor Tin, nor other Merchandize pertaining to the Staple, upon Pain of Forfeiture of the same."	The whole act.
8 Hen. 6. c. 21	Exportation	The said last mentioned Statute, whereby it is ordained, "That certain Licences to the Men of Newcastle and Berwick, for the exporting of Wools, shall be repealed; and that, if any of evil Will do sell or carry any Wools or Woolfells, Leather, Lead or any other Merchandizes of the Staple, in Defraud of the King or Hinderance of the Commodity of his Realm, into Scotland, that he shall forfeit the same Goods with the Double Value, and his Body to Prison by the Space of a Year."	The whole act.
10 Hen. 6. c. 1	Staple	A Statute made in the Tenth Year of the Reign of the said King Henry the Sixth, whereby it is ordained, "That all the Recognizances of Debts, before the Mayor and Constables of the Staple of Calais, made or to be made by any Persons beyond the Sea, shall be as effectual and executory, and of such Force in all Points within the Realm, and in the same Form executory, as the Recognizances made before the Mayor and Constables of the Staple of Westminster, or before any other Mayors or Constables within the said Realm be."	The whole act.
10 Hen. 6. c. 7	Exportation	The said last mentioned Statute, whereby any Penalty or Forfeiture is imposed or made payable, or any Search is authorized, in respect of any Wool, Woolfells, Hides, Lead, Tin or other Merchandizes of the Staple, carried into Scotland, Flanders, Holland, Zealand or Brabant.	The whole act.
11 Hen. 6. c. 13	Staple	A Statute made in the Eleventh Year of the Reign of King Henry the Sixth, whereby it is ordained, "That the Ordinance and Statute made in the Eighth Year of the said King Henry the Sixth, (Note: The staple 8 Hen. 6. c. 18) and hereinbefore recited, relating to the Sale of Wools, Woolfells, and Tin, at the Staple of Calais, and the Payment for the same, and the bringing Bullion to the Mint there, and the Partition of the Money for Wools and Woolfells sold there, should be continued; saving to the King Power and Authority to modify the same Statute by the Advice of his Council."	The whole act.
11 Hen. 6. c. 13	Exportation	The said Statute of the Eleventh Year of the Reign of King Henry the Sixth, whereby it is ordained and established, "That none, upon Pain of Felony, bring, carry or ship, nor cause to be brought, carried nor shipped, any Merchandizes of the Staple, in any Creeks within the Realm of England."	The whole act.
14 Hen. 6. c. 2	Staple	A Statute made in the Fourteenth Year of the Reign of the said King Henry the Sixth, whereby it is ordained, "That no Licences mentioned in the said Statute, as prejudicial and contrary to the common and universal Weal of the Realm and of the Merchants, and in Destruction of the Town of Calais, and of the Ordinance of Partition made in the Eighth Year of the Reign of the said King, shall in nowise be granted; and that every Man which shippeth, or doeth to be shipped, any Wools or Woolfells to carry them over the Sea in any wise, shall repair with the same to Calais, and there discharge the said Wools and Woolfells, after the Tenor of the Statutes, and after the good Rules and Ordinances of the Staple, saving as in the said Statute is saved and provided."	The whole act.
14 Hen. 6. c. 5	Exportation	The said Statute of the Fourteenth Year of the Reign of the said King Henry the Sixth, whereby it is ordained, "That all the Wools and Woolfells, and all other Merchandizes, which by Statute ought to repair to the Staple of Calais, found in any Creek, shipped contrary to the Statute and Ordinance made in the Eleventh Year of the Reign of the said King Henry Sixth, and hereinbefore recited and repealed, shall be forfeit: And that every Person that shall ship or cause to be shipped, any manner of Wools, Woolfells, or other Merchandize, to go to the Staple aforesaid, and come not there, shall forfeit as much Goods as the Wools, Woolfells and other Merchandizes by them so shipped and carried to other Places than to Calais do amount, by Extent after the very Value, except the Merchandizes which be to be excepted to pass by the King's Licence to other Places: And that if any Person lay any Wools, Woolfells or other Merchandize of the Staple, in any suspicious Place adjoining to the Water Side, and no Indenture thereof made betwixt him and the Mayor, Bailiffs or Constables of the Town in which such Wools, Woolfells and other Merchandize of the Staple be so laid, that the said Wools, Woolfells and Merchandize be forfeit; and that every Man shall have Power to make Search in every Place for such Goods of the Staple so carried or shipped, or laid to be shipped as aforesaid, without Impediment or Disturbance of any Person."	The whole act.
15 Hen. 6. c. 8	N/A	A Statute made in the Fifteenth Year of the Reign of the said King Henry the Sixth, whereby it is ordained, "That no Person shall ship nor do to be shipped, Wools, Woolfells and other Merchandizes pertaining to the Staple, in no Place within the Realm, but only at the Keys and Wharfs being in the Ports assigned by Statute, where the King's Weights and his Beam be set; and that every Master of the Ships and Vessels in which such Wools and Woolfells and Merchandizes be put, shall find Security to the Customer of the Ports where they do ship to carry the said Wools and Woolfells and Merchandize to the Staple of Calais, and to bring a Certification from thence that he hath so done."	The whole act.
18 Hen. 6. c. 15	Exportation	A Statute made in the Eighteenth Year of the Reign of the said King Henry the Sixth, whereby it is ordained, "That no manner of Person shall carry or do to be carried any Wools or Woolfells customable out of the Realm to other Places than to the Staple of Calais, without the King's Special Licence, upon Pain of Felony; and that if any Person do contrary thereto, and thereof be convicted or attainted, that he be adjudged for a Felon." and so much of the said Statute as relates to the enquiring, hearing and determining of such Offences	The whole act.
20 Hen. 6. c. 12	N/A	A Statute made in the Twentieth Year of the Reign of the said King Henry the Sixth, as relates to a certain Ordinance of Partition made upon Wools and Woolfells in the Staple at Calais.	The whole act. (Note: The whole act was repealed by the Statute Law Revision Act 1863 (26 & 27 Vict. c. 125). The note to that act states: "Repealed by 3 Geo. 4. c. 41. s. 5. The repeal is of "so much as relates to a certain Ordinance of Partition made upon Wools and Woolfells "at Staple at Calais." Qu. whether this is total; it seems so intended. If not repealed, the Act is expired or obsolete. In Ruffhead's Edition placed without a translation in Appendix of "Obsolete and Curious Acts" (in vol. 10.)")
27 Hen. 6. c. 2	Exportation	A Statute made in the Twenty seventh Year of the Reign of the said King Henry the Sixth Whereby it is ordained and established, "That the Mayors, Constables and Fellowship of Merchants of the Staple of Calais for the time being, and their Successors for ever, may have and enjoy all their Franchises and Liberties, and every of them, and whole Repair of all manner of Merchandizes to the said Staple by the said King or his Progenitors, to them or to their Predecessors, or any of them, by the Authority of Parliament granted or confirmed, not repealed nor accepted." and also, So much and all such Parts of the said last mentioned Statute as in any way relate to the said Mayor, Constables and Fellowship, and their Successors, or to any Powers, Authorities or Privileges to be used or exercised by them, or to any Action or Suit to be brought by them under the said Statute; and also, So much and such Parts of the said Statute as relate to any Licence for shipping Wools, Woolfells or Tin, out of the Realm of England, Ireland or Wales, to any other Place than to the Staple of Calais; or to the Shipping or carrying any Wools, Woolfells or Tin out of the Realm by colour of any Licence, and putting them to Sale in any other Port or Place out of the Realm than at the said Staple of Calais; or to any Penalties or Forfeitures of Money, Goods or Chattels imposed or inflicted in respect of any such Offences by the said Statute; or to any Powers of seizing any Wools, Woolfells or Tin, carried or shipped contrary to the said Statute; or to any Penalties on any Customer, Comptroller, Searcher or Surveyor, admitting any such Wools, Woolfells or Tin to be shipped to any other Port or Place than to the said Staple, or willingly suffering any such Merchandizes to pass out of the Realm, not customed or not weighed at the King's Beam; or to the Mode of recovering such Penalties; or to the Trial of any thing done contrary to the Ordinance of the said Statute, either within the Realm or without.	The whole act.
3 & 4 Edw. 4. c. 1	Exportation Act 1463	A Statute made in the Third Year of the Reign of King Edward the Fourth.	As relates to the buying or shipping of Wools or Woolfells, Morling or Shorling, by Aliens or Strangers within the Realm, or the carrying the same by them out of the Realm; or to the carrying any Wools, Woolfells, Morling or Shorling out of the Realm, by any Person, Stranger, Alien or Denizen, or to the shipping or carrying such Wools, Woolfells, Shorling or Morling to any Place out of the said Realm except to Calais; or to the shipping any Wools, Woolfells, Shorling or Morling of the growing within any of the Counties of Northumberland, Cumberland and Westmorland, or within the Bishopric of Durham; or to any Pain, Penalty or Forfeiture whatever, in respect of any Offences against the said Provisions of the said Statute. So much of the said last mentioned Statute, whereby it is ordained and established, "That no Merchant of the said Staple of Calais shall sell or utter any Wools, Woolfells, Morling or Shorling, or any other Merchandizes of the Staple, at the said Staple, but that he, before or upon Delivery of the same, receive and take ready Payment and Contentation for the same in manner directed by the said Statute, upon the Penalty or Forfeiture in the said Statute mentioned; and that Merchant of the said Staple shall sell or utter or alter the Property from him of the said Merchandizes of the Staple, nor no Part of the same, at any Place out of the Realm, other than at the said Staple of Calais."
4 Edw. 4. c. 2	Export of Wool Act 1464	A Statute made in the Fourth Year of the Reign of the said King Edward the Fourth, whereby it is granted, ordained and established, "That all Wools and Woolfells, Shorling and Morling that shall be shipped to pass out of the Realm, shall be shipped at the Towns of such Ports wherein the King hath his Beam, his Weights and Collectors of the Customs, to serve and deliver the Merchandize as specified and set forth in the said Statute; and that every Person that so shall ship or cause to be shipped out of this Realm, any Wools, Woolfells, Shorling or Morling, upon the shipping of them, and before that they pass out of any of the said Towns where they shall be shipped, shall find Surety to the King and the Collector of his Customs there, that the same Wools, Woolfells, Shorling and Morling, shall pass to Calais and to none other Place, without Fraud or Collusion."	The whole act.
4 Edw. 4. c. 3	Exportation (Newcastle) Act 1464	The said last mentioned Statute as relates to any Certificate of the Customer testifying the coming of all such Ships with Wools, Woolfells, Shorling and Morling to Calais, or as imposes any Penalty on such Customer not giving such Certificate, or on any Person not bringing in such Certificate, or on any Person doing contrary to the said Statute, or as relates to the Application or Recovery of any such Penalty and as relates to the shipping of any Wool or Woolfells, Morling or Shorling, shipped at the Port and Town of Newcastle, or as imposes any Penalty or Forfeiture in respect of any such Wools, Woolfells, Morling or Shorling, at the said Town or Port, or as relates to the Application or Recovery of any such Penalty or Forfeiture.	The whole act.
12 Edw. 4. c. 5	Wool Act 1472	A Statute made in the Twelfth Year of the Reign of the said King Edward the Fourth, whereby it is enacted, ordained and established, "That all the Wools, Woolfells and Fells called Shorling and Morling, growing within the Realm (other than in the said Statute are excepted) to be shipped and conveyed out of the Realm, shall be conveyed to the Staple of Calais, and to none other Place, and that if any Man do the contrary, and thereupon be duly convict, that then he shall stand and be of like Condition as a Man attainted of Felony after the Course of the Common Law, and shall incur like Pain and Forfeiture as he so attainted for the same should do." and whereby it is ordained, "That all Wools and Confirming Woolfells, and Fells called Morling and Shorling, growing or being and amending in any County of the Realm, or in Wales, or in the Markets of the same, other than before excepted, to be carried out of the Realm, shall be conveyed to the said Staple of Calais and to none other Place, upon the same Penalty and Forfeiture; the Prerogative of the King to grant any Licence to the contrary except."	
14 Edw. 4. c. 3	Wool Act 1474	A Statute made in the Fourteenth Year of the Reign of said King Edward the Fourth, whereby it is ordained and hereby it is ordained stablished, "That the Act of the Twelfth Year of the Reign of the said King Edward the Fourth, (Note: Wool Act 1474 (12 Edw. 4. c. 5)) immediately hereinbefore recited, should be in full Strength and Effect in every Point thereof, accordingly; saving only as in the said Statute of the said Fourteenth Year is saved and excepted." and as relates to Wools, Woolfells and Fells called Shorling and Morling, growing and being within the Counties of Westmorland, Cumberland, Northumberland, the Bishopric of Durham, Richmondshire and Allerton, to be carried out of the Realm.	The whole act.

Section 6 of the act repealed ? enactments, listed in that section.

Citation	Short title	Description	Extent of repeal
1 Hen. 7. c. 3	Protections Act 1485	An Act made in the First Year of the Reign of King Henry the Seventh, intituled An Act that no Protection shall be allowed before the Mayor of the Staple at Calais.	The whole act.
37 Hen. 8. c. 15	Wool Act 1545	An Act made in the Thirty seventh Year of the Reign of King Henry the Eighth, intituled An Act against regrating of Wools.	As relates to the buying of any Wool by Merchants of the Staple at Calais, and their Servants and Factors, for the only Provision of the said Staple, and to be shipped only to the said Staple. (Note: The whole act was repealed by the Statute Law Revision Act 1863 (26 & 27 Vict. c. 125). The note to that act states: "Expired or obsolete. Expressed to be repealed in part by 3 Geo. 4. c. 41. s. 6., but the description of what is to be repealed does not accurately correspond with the contents of this Act. In Ruffhead's Edition treated as expired.")
5 & 6 Edw. 6. c. 7	Wool Act 1551	An Act made in the Parliament holden in the Fifth and Sixth Years of the Reign of King Edward the Sixth, intituled An Act limiting the Time of buying and selling of Wools.	As relates to the buying of Wool by any Merchant of the Staple at Calais, or his or their Apprentice or Apprentices, to be shipped to the Staple at Calais, and to the Sale by the said Merchants of the Staple, of any Refuse, coarse Wools and Locks, such as is not mete for the Staple.
5 Eliz. 1. c. 22	Exportation (No. 2) Act 1562	An Act made in the Fifth Year of the Reign of Queen Elizabeth, intituled An Act against the carrying of Sheep Skins and Pelts over the Sea not being Staple Ware.	Whereby it is provided, " That it shall and may be lawful to the Merchants of the Staple, their Servants, Factors and Attornies, and every of them to carry and transport all such lawful Wares as theretofore they had been accustomed and lawfully might." I.e., section 3.
13 Eliz. 1. c. 1 (I)	N/A	An Act made in the Parliament of Ireland, in the Thirteenth Year of the Reign of Queen Elizabeth, intituled An Act that such Cloth and Stuff as shall be wrought of the Wool Flocks, Linen Yarn, Woollen Yarn, Sheep Fell, Calf Fell, Goat Fell, Red Deer Fell or Fallow Deer Fell, within this Realm, shall be transported for Merchandize only by the Merchants within every the Staple Cities and Towns of this Realm, and by the free Merchants of the Boroughs and Privileged Towns, and by none others.	The whole act.

Section 7 of the act provided that nothing in the act would extend, repeal or alter the following acts:

Citation	Short title	Description	Extent of description
13 Edw. 1	Statutum Mercatorum	A Statute made in the Thirteenth Year of the Reign of King Edward the First, usually called The Statutes of Merchants.	The whole act.
27 Edw. 3. Stat. 2. c. 9	Ordinance of the Staples 1353	The hereinbefore mentioned Statute of the Staple or Ordinance of the Staples made in the Twenty seventh Year of the Reign of King Edward the Third.	As relates to Recognizances acknowledged in the Staples for Recovery of Debts.
15 Ric. 2. c. 9	The staple.	A Statute made in the Fifteenth Year of King Richard the Second, whereby so much of the said last mentioned Statute of the Twenty seventh Year of King Edward the Third.	As relates to the said Recognizances, is confirmed or amended.
5 Hen. 4. c. 12	Execution on Statute Merchant	A Statute made in the Fifth Year of the Reign of King Henry the Fourth.	As relates to the regulating of Executions upon Statutes Merchants.
11 Hen. 6. c. 10	Staple	A Statute made in the Eleventh Year of the Reign of King Henry the Sixth.	As relates to the regulating Proceedings on Writs of Scire facias to defeat Executions on Statutes Staple.
23 Hen. 8. c. 6	Recognizances for Debt Act 1531	An Act For Obligations to be taken by the Two Chief Justices, the Mayor of the Staple and the Recorder of London,' made in the Twenty third Year of the Reign of King Henry the Eighth, and intituled An Act concerning before whom Recognizances of Debt shall be made, and the Form of the Obligation.	The whole act.
27 Eliz. 1. c. 4	Fraudulent Conveyances Act 1584	An Act made in the Twenty seventh Year of the Reign of Queen Elizabeth, intituled An Act against &c. covenous and fraudulent Conveyances.	As in any way relates to or concerns Recognizances by Statutes Merchant, or Statutes of the Staple. I.e., section 7.
8 Geo. 1. c. 25	Judgments, Wales and Counties Palatine Act 1721	An Act made in the Eighth Year of the Reign of King George the First, intituled An Act for supplying some Defects in the Statute of the Twenty third of King Henry the Eighth, intituled ' An Act for Obligations to be taken by the Two Chief Justices, the Mayor of the Staple and the Recorder of London;' and for setting down the Time of signing Judgments in the Principality of Wales and Counties Palatine	The whole act.

Section 8 of the act provided that nothing in the act would extend, repeal or alter the Confirmation, etc., of 27 Ed. 3. St. 2 Act 1354 (28 Edw. 3. c. 13) or Inquests (8 Hen. 6. c. 29) as relates to juries where aliens are parties.

Section 9 of the act provided that "nothing in this Act contained shall extend or be construed to extend to repeal any of the Statutes or Acts, or Parts of Statutes or Acts, hereinbefore mentioned, so far as the same or any of them may relate to the Contents of Tuns, Pipes, Tertians, Hogsheads or other Vessels of Wine, Oil, Honey and other gaugable Liquors or Articles im- ported into the City of London or the Liberties thereof, or the gauging thereof, which the Mayor and Commonalty and Citizens of the City of London are, by divers Grants and Charters of His Majesty's Royal Predecessors, or claim to be, authorized or empowered to gauge within the City of London and the Liberties thereof; nor to repeal the Duty called Gauge, which the said Mayor and Commonalty and Citizens are entitled, or claim to have, receive and enjoy by virtue of the aforesaid Grants or Charters, or any of them; but the same shall continue and be used and exercised as if this Act had not been passed."

Section 10 of the act confirmed the repeals of ? enactments, listed in that section.

Citation	Short title	Description	Repealing enactment – citation	Repealing enactment – short title	Repealing enactment – description	Extent of repeal
14 Ric. 2. c. 7	Customs	A Statute made in the Fourteenth Year of the Reign of King Richard the Second, as ordains that the Passage of Tin out of the Realm shall be at the Port of Dartmouth, and no where else.	N/A			The whole act.
15 Ric. 2. c. 8	Exportation	A Statute made in the Fifteenth Year of the Reign of the said King Richard the Second, as concerns the Carriage of Tin to Calais.	N/A			The whole act.
2 Hen. 4. c. 6	Foreign coin	A Statute made in the Second Year of the Reign of King Henry the Fourth, as prohibits the bringing in of Coin of Flanders or Scotland, and other Foreign Coin.	21 Jas. 1. c. 28	Continuance, etc. of Laws Act 1623	An Act made in the Twenty first Year of the Reign of King James the First, intituled An Act for continuing and reviving of divers Statutes and Repeal of divers others. (Note: Section 11.)	The whole act.
8 Hen. 6. c. 2	Trade with Denmark Act 1429	A Statute made in the Eighth Year of the Reign of King Henry the Sixth, whereby it was ordained and established, that none of the King's Subjects, being Englishmen, should go or repair into any of the Parts, Lordships or Dominions of the King of Denmark.	1 Hen. 8. c. 1	Repeal of the Trade with Denmark Act 1429 Act 1509	An Act made in the First Year of the Reign of King Henry the Eighth, intituled An Act for the repealing of a Statute for fishing in Iceland	The whole act.
3 Hen. 7. c. 7	Customs Act 1487	An Act made in the Third Year of the Reign of King Henry the Seventh, intituled An Act against Merchants carrying of Goods from one Port to another, without a Certificate from the Customer where the Goods were first entered.	1 Hen. 8. c. 5	Customs Act 1509	An Act made in the First Year of the Reign of King Henry the Eighth, intituled An Act for the true Payment of the King's Customs.	Whereby it was ordained and established, that no manner of Merchant, Denizen nor Stranger, should take upon him to enter or cause to be entered in the Books of any Customer of any Port within the same, any manner of Merchandize coming into the Realm or going out of the same, in any other Merchant's Name, save only the Name of the Merchant owing the same, upon Pain of Forfeiture of all such Goods and Merchandizes so entered.
3 Hen. 8. c. 15	Hats and Caps Act 1511	An Act made in the Third Year of the Reign of King Henry the Eighth, intituled An Act concerning Hats and Caps.	1 Jas. 1. c. 25	Continuance, etc. of Laws Act 1603	An Act made in the First Year of the Reign of King James the First, intituled An Act for continuing and reviving of divers Statutes, and for repealing of some others. (Note: Section 7.)	The whole act.
21 Hen. 8. c. 9	Prices of Foreign Hats, etc. Act 1529	;- and also an Act, made in the Twenty first Year of the Reign of the said King Henry the Eighth, intituled An Act limiting the Prices of Hats and Caps brought from beyond the Seas;-or, An Act limiting the Prices of Woollen Hats, Bonnets and Caps made beyond the Sea, and brought to be sold within this Realm.	1 Jas. 1. c. 25	Continuance, etc. of Laws Act 1603	An Act made in the First Year of the Reign of King James the First, intituled An Act for continuing and reviving of divers Statutes, and for repealing of some others. (Note: Section 7.)	The whole act.
1 Mar. Sess. 2. c. 11	Hats and Caps Act 1553	An Act made in the First Year of the Reign of Queen Mary, intituled An Act for the Sale of Hats and Caps made beyond the Seas.	1 Jas. 1. c. 25	Continuance, etc. of Laws Act 1603	An Act made in the First Year of the Reign of King James the First, intituled An Act for continuing and reviving of divers Statutes, and for repealing of some others. (Note: Section 7.)	The whole act.
5 Hen. 8. c. 7	Leather Act 1513	An Act made in the Fifth Year of. the Reign of the said King Henry the Eighth, intituled An Act that Strangers buy no Leather but in open Market; or, An Act for Strangers for buying of Leather in open Market.	5 Eliz. 1. c. 8	Leather Act 1562	An Act made in the Fifth Year of the Reign of Queen Elizabeth, intituled An Act touching Tanners, Curriers, Shoemakers and other Artificers occupying the cutting of Leather. (Note: Section 44.)	The whole act.
21 Hen. 8. c. 14	Importation Act 1529	An Act made in the Twenty first Year of the Reign of King Henry the Eighth, intituled An Act for the Linen Drapers in London.	28 Hen. 8. c. 4	Cloths Act 1536	Act made in the Twenty eighth Year of the Reign of the said King Henry the Eighth, intituled An Act repealing of the Statute lately made, for the bringing in of Dowlas and Lokerams.	The whole act.
12 Edw. 4. c. 2 (I)	N/A	An Act made in the Parliament of Ireland, in the Twelfth Year of the Reign of King Edward the Fourth, intituled An Act for bringing Bows into this Realm, from the Realm of England, by Merchants and others, was repealed by Act made in the Parliament of Ireland, in the Tenth Year of the Reign of King Charles the First, for repealing the said Act of King Edward the Fourth.	10 Chas. 1. Sess. 3. c. 22 (I)	N/A		The whole act.
2 & 3 Edw. 6. c. 26	Exportation Act 1548	An Act made in the Parliament holden in the Second and Third Years of the Reign of King Edward the Sixth, intituled An Act against the carrying of White Ashes out of this Realm.	28 Geo. 3. c. 16	Exportation Act 1788	An Act made in the Twenty eighth Year of the Reign of His late Majesty King George the Third, for repealing the said Act of King Edward the Sixth.	The whole act.
1 Eliz. 1. c. 9	Leather (No. 2) Act 1558	An Act made in the First Year of the Reign of Queen Elizabeth, intituled An Act that carrying of Leather, Tallow or Raw Hides out of the Realm for Exporting Merchandize, shall be felony.	18 Eliz. 1. c. 9	Exportation Act 1575	An Act made in the Eighteenth Year of the Reign of the said Queen Elizabeth, intituled An Act against the transporting of Leather, Tallow and Raw Hides out of the Realm.	The whole act.
1 Jas. 1. c. 22 (Note: This is the citation in The Statutes of the Realm.) 2 Jas. 1. c. 22 (Note: This is the citation in The Statutes at Large.)	Leather Act 1603	An Act, made in the First Year of the Reign of King James the First, intituled An Act concerning Tanners, Curriers, Shoemakers and other Artificers occupying the cutting of Leather.	48 Geo. 3. c. 60	Tanners, Curriers, Shoemakers, etc. Act 1808	An Act made in the Forty eighth Year of the Reign of His late Majesty King George the Third, made among other Things for repealing the said Act of King James the First. (Note: Section 1.)	Whereby any Penalty is imposed on Officers of Customs, permitting the undue Exportation of Leather, and the whole of which Act, of the First Year of King James. I.e., section 48.
5 Hen. 8. c. 3	Exportation Act 1513	The several Acts made in the Fifth, Twenty seventh and Thirty third Years of the Reign of King Henry the Eighth, relating to the Exportation of Cloths.	50 Geo. 3. c. 83	Woollen Manufacture Act 1810	An Act made in the Fiftieth Year of the Reign of His late Majesty King George the Third, intituled An Act to repeal several Acts respecting the Woollen Manufacture, and for indemnifying Persons liable to any Penalty for having acted contrary thereto.	The whole act.
27 Hen 8. c. 13	Exportation Act 1535	The several Acts made in the Fifth, Twenty seventh and Thirty third Years of the Reign of King Henry the Eighth, relating to the Exportation of Cloths.	50 Geo. 3. c. 83	Woollen Manufacture Act 1810	An Act made in the Fiftieth Year of the Reign of His late Majesty King George the Third, intituled An Act to repeal several Acts respecting the Woollen Manufacture, and for indemnifying Persons liable to any Penalty for having acted contrary thereto.	The whole act.
33 Hen. 8. c. 19	Exportation Act 1541	The several Acts made in the Fifth, Twenty seventh and Thirty third Years of the Reign of King Henry the Eighth, relating to the Exportation of Cloths.	50 Geo. 3. c. 83	Woollen Manufacture Act 1810	An Act made in the Fiftieth Year of the Reign of His late Majesty King George the Third, intituled An Act to repeal several Acts respecting the Woollen Manufacture, and for indemnifying Persons liable to any Penalty for having acted contrary thereto.	The whole act.
3 Edw. 4. c. 4	Importation (No. 2) Act 1463	The several Acts or Parts of the Statutes made in the Third Year of the Reign of King Edward the Fourth, and in the First Year of the Reign of King Richard the Third.	56 Geo. 3. c. 36	Importation (No. 4) Act 1816	An Act made in the Fifty sixth Year of the Reign of His said late Majesty King George the Third, intituled An Act to repeal Two Acts passed in the Reign of King Edward the Fourth, and King Richard the Third, which prohibit the Importation of Wrought Goods and certain other Articles.	The whole act.
1 Ric. 3. c. 12	Importation Act 1483	The several Acts or Parts of the Statutes made in the Third Year of the Reign of King Edward the Fourth, and in the First Year of the Reign of King Richard the Third.	56 Geo. 3. c. 36	Importation (No. 4) Act 1816	An Act made in the Fifty sixth Year of the Reign of His said late Majesty King George the Third, intituled An Act to repeal Two Acts passed in the Reign of King Edward the Fourth, and King Richard the Third, which prohibit the Importation of Wrought Goods and certain other Articles.	The whole act.
17 Edw. 3. c. 1	N/A	The Statutes, made in the Seventeenth, Twenty seventh and Thirty eighth Years of the Reign of King Edward the Third, and in the Fifth and Seventeenth Years of the Reign of King Richard the Second, and in the Second Year of the Reign of King Henry the Fourth, and in the Second Year of the Reign of King Henry the Sixth, and in the Fourth Year of the Reign of King Henry the Seventh, and in the Sixth and Seventh, and Seventh and Eighth Years of the Reign of King William the Third.	59 Geo. 3. c. 49	Resumption of Cash Payments, etc. Act 1819	An Act made in the Fifty ninth Year of the Reign of His late Majesty King George the Third, made, among other Things, to permit the Exportation of Gold and Silver. (Note: Sections 11 and 12.)	As relate to the Exportation of Gold or Silver in Money, Bullion, Plate, Vessel, Mass or Jewel of Gold or Silver, or Molten Silver or Bullion.
27 Edw. 3. Stat. 2. c. 14	N/A	The Statutes, made in the Seventeenth, Twenty seventh and Thirty eighth Years of the Reign of King Edward the Third, and in the Fifth and Seventeenth Years of the Reign of King Richard the Second, and in the Second Year of the Reign of King Henry the Fourth, and in the Second Year of the Reign of King Henry the Sixth, and in the Fourth Year of the Reign of King Henry the Seventh, and in the Sixth and Seventh, and Seventh and Eighth Years of the Reign of King William the Third.	59 Geo. 3. c. 49	Resumption of Cash Payments, etc. Act 1819	An Act made in the Fifty ninth Year of the Reign of His late Majesty King George the Third, made, among other Things, to permit the Exportation of Gold and Silver. (Note: Sections 11 and 12.)	As relate to the Exportation of Gold or Silver in Money, Bullion, Plate, Vessel, Mass or Jewel of Gold or Silver, or Molten Silver or Bullion.
38 Edw. 3. Stat. 1. c. 2	N/A	The Statutes, made in the Seventeenth, Twenty seventh and Thirty eighth Years of the Reign of King Edward the Third, and in the Fifth and Seventeenth Years of the Reign of King Richard the Second, and in the Second Year of the Reign of King Henry the Fourth, and in the Second Year of the Reign of King Henry the Sixth, and in the Fourth Year of the Reign of King Henry the Seventh, and in the Sixth and Seventh, and Seventh and Eighth Years of the Reign of King William the Third.	59 Geo. 3. c. 49	Resumption of Cash Payments, etc. Act 1819	An Act made in the Fifty ninth Year of the Reign of His late Majesty King George the Third, made, among other Things, to permit the Exportation of Gold and Silver. (Note: Sections 11 and 12.)	As relate to the Exportation of Gold or Silver in Money, Bullion, Plate, Vessel, Mass or Jewel of Gold or Silver, or Molten Silver or Bullion.
5 Ric. 2. Stat. 1. c. 2	Exportation of gold, silver, leaving the realm	The Statutes, made in the Seventeenth, Twenty seventh and Thirty eighth Years of the Reign of King Edward the Third, and in the Fifth and Seventeenth Years of the Reign of King Richard the Second, and in the Second Year of the Reign of King Henry the Fourth, and in the Second Year of the Reign of King Henry the Sixth, and in the Fourth Year of the Reign of King Henry the Seventh, and in the Sixth and Seventh, and Seventh and Eighth Years of the Reign of King William the Third.	59 Geo. 3. c. 49	Resumption of Cash Payments, etc. Act 1819	An Act made in the Fifty ninth Year of the Reign of His late Majesty King George the Third, made, among other Things, to permit the Exportation of Gold and Silver. (Note: Sections 11 and 12.)	As relate to the Exportation of Gold or Silver in Money, Bullion, Plate, Vessel, Mass or Jewel of Gold or Silver, or Molten Silver or Bullion.
17 Ric. 2. c. 1	Money	The Statutes, made in the Seventeenth, Twenty seventh and Thirty eighth Years of the Reign of King Edward the Third, and in the Fifth and Seventeenth Years of the Reign of King Richard the Second, and in the Second Year of the Reign of King Henry the Fourth, and in the Second Year of the Reign of King Henry the Sixth, and in the Fourth Year of the Reign of King Henry the Seventh, and in the Sixth and Seventh, and Seventh and Eighth Years of the Reign of King William the Third.	59 Geo. 3. c. 49	Resumption of Cash Payments, etc. Act 1819	An Act made in the Fifty ninth Year of the Reign of His late Majesty King George the Third, made, among other Things, to permit the Exportation of Gold and Silver. (Note: Sections 11 and 12.)	As relate to the Exportation of Gold or Silver in Money, Bullion, Plate, Vessel, Mass or Jewel of Gold or Silver, or Molten Silver or Bullion.
2 Hen. 4. c. 5	Exportation of gold or silver	The Statutes, made in the Seventeenth, Twenty seventh and Thirty eighth Years of the Reign of King Edward the Third, and in the Fifth and Seventeenth Years of the Reign of King Richard the Second, and in the Second Year of the Reign of King Henry the Fourth, and in the Second Year of the Reign of King Henry the Sixth, and in the Fourth Year of the Reign of King Henry the Seventh, and in the Sixth and Seventh, and Seventh and Eighth Years of the Reign of King William the Third.	59 Geo. 3. c. 49	Resumption of Cash Payments, etc. Act 1819	An Act made in the Fifty ninth Year of the Reign of His late Majesty King George the Third, made, among other Things, to permit the Exportation of Gold and Silver. (Note: Sections 11 and 12.)	As relate to the Exportation of Gold or Silver in Money, Bullion, Plate, Vessel, Mass or Jewel of Gold or Silver, or Molten Silver or Bullion.
2 Hen. 6. c. 6	Exportation of gold or silver	The Statutes, made in the Seventeenth, Twenty seventh and Thirty eighth Years of the Reign of King Edward the Third, and in the Fifth and Seventeenth Years of the Reign of King Richard the Second, and in the Second Year of the Reign of King Henry the Fourth, and in the Second Year of the Reign of King Henry the Sixth, and in the Fourth Year of the Reign of King Henry the Seventh, and in the Sixth and Seventh, and Seventh and Eighth Years of the Reign of King William the Third.	59 Geo. 3. c. 49	Resumption of Cash Payments, etc. Act 1819	An Act made in the Fifty ninth Year of the Reign of His late Majesty King George the Third, made, among other Things, to permit the Exportation of Gold and Silver. (Note: Sections 11 and 12.)	As relate to the Exportation of Gold or Silver in Money, Bullion, Plate, Vessel, Mass or Jewel of Gold or Silver, or Molten Silver or Bullion.
4 & 5 Hen. 7. c. 23	Exportation Act 1488	The Statutes, made in the Seventeenth, Twenty seventh and Thirty eighth Years of the Reign of King Edward the Third, and in the Fifth and Seventeenth Years of the Reign of King Richard the Second, and in the Second Year of the Reign of King Henry the Fourth, and in the Second Year of the Reign of King Henry the Sixth, and in the Fourth Year of the Reign of King Henry the Seventh, and in the Sixth and Seventh, and Seventh and Eighth Years of the Reign of King William the Third.	59 Geo. 3. c. 49	Resumption of Cash Payments, etc. Act 1819	An Act made in the Fifty ninth Year of the Reign of His late Majesty King George the Third, made, among other Things, to permit the Exportation of Gold and Silver. (Note: Sections 11 and 12.)	As relate to the Exportation of Gold or Silver in Money, Bullion, Plate, Vessel, Mass or Jewel of Gold or Silver, or Molten Silver or Bullion.
6 & 7 Will. 3. c. 17	Coin Act 1694	The Statutes, made in the Seventeenth, Twenty seventh and Thirty eighth Years of the Reign of King Edward the Third, and in the Fifth and Seventeenth Years of the Reign of King Richard the Second, and in the Second Year of the Reign of King Henry the Fourth, and in the Second Year of the Reign of King Henry the Sixth, and in the Fourth Year of the Reign of King Henry the Seventh, and in the Sixth and Seventh, and Seventh and Eighth Years of the Reign of King William the Third.	59 Geo. 3. c. 49	Resumption of Cash Payments, etc. Act 1819	An Act made in the Fifty ninth Year of the Reign of His late Majesty King George the Third, made, among other Things, to permit the Exportation of Gold and Silver. (Note: Sections 11 and 12.)	As relate to the Exportation of Gold or Silver in Money, Bullion, Plate, Vessel, Mass or Jewel of Gold or Silver, or Molten Silver or Bullion.
7 & 8 Will. 3. c. 19	Coinage Act 1695	The Statutes, made in the Seventeenth, Twenty seventh and Thirty eighth Years of the Reign of King Edward the Third, and in the Fifth and Seventeenth Years of the Reign of King Richard the Second, and in the Second Year of the Reign of King Henry the Fourth, and in the Second Year of the Reign of King Henry the Sixth, and in the Fourth Year of the Reign of King Henry the Seventh, and in the Sixth and Seventh, and Seventh and Eighth Years of the Reign of King William the Third.	59 Geo. 3. c. 49	Resumption of Cash Payments, etc. Act 1819	An Act made in the Fifty ninth Year of the Reign of His late Majesty King George the Third, made, among other Things, to permit the Exportation of Gold and Silver. (Note: Sections 11 and 12.)	As relate to the Exportation of Gold or Silver in Money, Bullion, Plate, Vessel, Mass or Jewel of Gold or Silver, or Molten Silver or Bullion.
5 Eliz. 1. c. 7	Importation Act 1562	An Act made in the Fifth Year of the Reign of Queen Elizabeth, intituled An Act avoiding divers Foreign Wares made by Handicraftsmen beyond the Seas.	59 Geo. 3. c. 73	Importation, etc. Act 1819	An Act made in the Fifty ninth Year of the Reign of His said late Majesty King George the Third, made to repeal, among others, several Acts prohibiting the Importation of certain Wrought Goods, and the Exportation of Gunpowder.	The whole act.
12 Cha. 2. c. 4	Subsidy Act 1660	An Act made in the Twelfth Year of the Reign of King Charles the Second, for a Subsidy.	59 Geo. 3. c. 73	Importation, etc. Act 1819	An Act made in the Fifty ninth Year of the Reign of His said late Majesty King George the Third, made to repeal, among others, several Acts prohibiting the Importation of certain Wrought Goods, and the Exportation of Gunpowder.	As prohibits the shipping, carrying out and transporting Gunpowder, when the Price of the same doth exceed Five Pounds per Barrel. I.e., section 11.

== Subsequent developments ==
The Repeal of Acts Concerning Importation (No. 2) Act 1822 (3 Geo. 4. c. 42) and the Navigation and Commerce Act 1822 (c. 43) were passed at the simultaneously to repeal similar statutes and to further encourage shipping and navigation.

The act was criticised by Thomas Chisholm Anstey, a member of the Board for the Revision of the Statute Law, for its lack of clarity and organization, with legal commentators noting that it contributed to confusion by requiring inquirers to navigate back and forth through different historical statutes, exacerbating the difficulties of interpreting legislative repeals.

The qualified terms of the repeal led to several acts being repealed by later acts, including Statute Law Revision Acts:

- Weights and Measures Act 1824 (5 Geo. 4. c. 74)
- Repeal of Obsolete Statutes Act 1856 (19 & 20 Vict. c. 64)
- Statute Law Revision Act 1863 (6 & 27 Vict. c. 125)

The whole act was repealed by section 1 of, and the schedule to, the Statute Law Revision Act 1873 (36 & 37 Vict. c. 91), which came into force on 5 August 1873.
