= List of acts of the Parliament of England from 1485 =

This is a list of acts of the Parliament of England for the year 1485.

For acts passed during the period 1707–1800, see the list of acts of the Parliament of Great Britain. See also the list of acts of the Parliament of Scotland, and the list of acts of the Parliament of Ireland.

For acts passed from 1801 onwards, see the list of acts of the Parliament of the United Kingdom. For acts of the devolved parliaments and assemblies in the United Kingdom, see the list of acts of the Scottish Parliament, the list of acts of the Northern Ireland Assembly, and the list of acts and measures of Senedd Cymru; see also the list of acts of the Parliament of Northern Ireland.

For medieval statutes, etc. that are not considered to be acts of Parliament, see the list of English statutes.

See also the List of ordinances and acts of the Parliament of England, 1642–1660 for ordinances and acts passed by the Long Parliament and other bodies without royal assent, and which were not considered to be valid legislation following the Restoration in 1660.

The number shown after each act's title is its chapter number. Acts are cited using this number, preceded by the years of the reign during which the relevant parliamentary session was held; thus the Union with Ireland Act 1800 is cited as "39 & 40 Geo. 3. c. 67", meaning the 67th act passed during the session that started in the 39th year of the reign of George III and which finished in the 40th year of that reign. The modern convention is to use Arabic numerals in citations (thus "41 Geo. 3" rather than "41 Geo. III"). Acts of the last session of the Parliament of Great Britain and the first session of the Parliament of the United Kingdom are both cited as "41 Geo. 3".

Acts passed by the Parliament of England did not have a short title; however, some of these acts have subsequently been given a short title by acts of the Parliament of the United Kingdom, such as the Short Titles Act 1896 (59 & 60 Vict. c. 14).

Acts passed by the Parliament of England were deemed to have come into effect on the first day of the session in which they were passed. Because of this, the years given in the list below may in fact be the year before a particular act was passed.

== 1 Hen. 7 ==
The 1st Parliament of King Henry VII, which met from 7 November 1485.

This session was also traditionally cited as 1 H. 7.

Short title	Citation	Royal assent
Long title
Title of the King (repealed)	1 Hen. 7. c. 0 (Part preceding c. 1)	7 November 1485 (Note: Start of session)
Titulus Regis. (Repealed by Statute Law Revision Act 1948 (11 & 12 Geo. 6. c. 62))
Real Actions Act 1485 (repealed)	1 Hen. 7. c. 1	7 November 1485
An Act that the Demundant in a forme downe shall have his accion agaynst the proner of the proffytts. (Repealed for England and Wales by Statute Law Revision Act 1863 (26 & 27 Vict. c. 125) and for Ireland by Statute Law (Ireland) Revision Act 1872 (35 & 36 Vict. c. 98))
Denizens Act 1485 (repealed)	1 Hen. 7. c. 2	7 November 1485
An Acte that Denysons shall paye Custdome and Subsidy. (Repealed by Repeal of Acts Concerning Importation Act 1822 (3 Geo. 4. c. 41))
Protections Act 1485 (repealed)	1 Hen. 7. c. 3	7 November 1485
An Acte that noe preteccion shalbe allowed before the Mayor of the Staple at Callys. (Repealed by Repeal of Acts Concerning Importation Act 1822 (3 Geo. 4. c. 41))
Clergy Act 1485 (repealed)	1 Hen. 7. c. 4	7 November 1485
An Acte for Busshopps to punnysh Priests and other religious men for dishonest lyffe. (Repealed for England and Wales by Church Discipline Act 1840 (3 & 4 Vict. c. 86) and for Ireland by Statute Law Revision (Ireland) Act 1872 (35 & 36 Vict. c. 98))
Tanners Act 1485 (repealed)	1 Hen. 7. c. 5	7 November 1485
An Act shewing the duties of a cordwainer, tanner, and currier. (Repealed for England and Wales by Statute Law Revision Act 1863 (26 & 27 Vict. c. 125) and for Ireland by Statute Law (Ireland) Revision Act 1872 (35 & 36 Vict. c. 98))
Pardon Act 1485 (repealed)	1 Hen. 7. c. 6	7 November 1485
An Acte that certayne persons within Sanctuary shall not have any accions brought agaynst them. (Repealed for England and Wales by Statute Law Revision Act 1863 (26 & 27 Vict. c. 125) and for Ireland by Statute Law (Ireland) Revision Act 1872 (35 & 36 Vict. c. 98))
Hunting in Forests Act 1485 (repealed)	1 Hen. 7. c. 7	7 November 1485
An Acte agaynst unlawfull hunting in Forests & Parks. Repealed for England and Wales by Criminal Statutes Repeal Act 1827 (7 & 8 Geo. 4. c. 27), for Ireland by Criminal Statutes (Ireland) Repeal Act 1828 (9 Geo. 4. c. 53) and for India by Criminal Law (India) Act 1828 (9 Geo. 4. c. 74)
Importation Act 1485 (repealed)	1 Hen. 7. c. 8	7 November 1485
An Acte agaynst bringing in of Gascoigne Wyne, except in English, Irush, or Welchmens Ships. (Repealed by Repeal of Acts Concerning Importation Act 1822 (3 Geo. 4. c. 41))
Importation (No. 2) Act 1485 (repealed)	1 Hen. 7. c. 9	7 November 1485
An Acte agaynst Marchaunt Straungers for bringing into this Realme Gyrdells Rybons Laces &c. (Repealed by Repeal of Acts Concerning Importation Act 1822 (3 Geo. 4. c. 41))
Aliens Act 1485 (repealed)	1 Hen. 7. c. 10	7 November 1485
Revocacion of Kyng Richardis Acte ayenst Italiens. (Repealed for England and Wales by Statute Law Revision Act 1863 (26 & 27 Vict. c. 125) and for Ireland by Statute Law (Ireland) Revision Act 1872 (35 & 36 Vict. c. 98))

=== Sources ===
- "1° Hen. VII.". The Statutes of the Realm. Vol. 2: 1377 to 1509. pp. 499–508 – via HathiTrust.
- "Anno primo Henrici VII". The Statutes at Large. Vol. 4 - 1 Richard III to 31 Henry VIII - 1483-4 to 1539. pp. 22–27 – via Internet Archive.
- "Anno primo Henrici VII". The Statutes at Large. Vol. 4 - 1 Richard III to 31 Henry VIII - 1483-4 to 1539. pp. 22–27 – via Internet Archive.
- "Anno primo Henrici VII". The Statutes at Large. Vol. 4 - 1 Richard III to 31 Henry VIII - 1483-4 to 1539. pp. 22–27 – via Internet Archive.
- Chronological Table of and Index to the Statutes. Vol. 1: To the End of the Session 59 Vict. Sess. 2 (1895) (13th ed.). London: Her Majesty's Stationery Office. 1896. p. 40 – via Google Books.
- Chronological Table of the Statutes: Covering the Period from 1235 to the End of 1971. London: Her Majesty's Stationery Office. 1972. pp. 34–35. ISBN 978-0-11-840096-1 – via Google Books.

== See also ==
- List of acts of the Parliament of England
