= Ordinance of the Staple =

Act of the Parliament of England

Statute of the Staple
- Act of Parliament
- Parliament of England
- Citation: 27 Edw. 3. Stat. 2
- Territorial extent: England and Wales; Ireland

Dates
- Royal assent: October 1353
- Commencement: 1353
- Repealed: England and Wales: 28 July 1863; Ireland: 10 August 1872
Other legislation
Amended by	Repeal of Acts Concerning Importation Act 1822; Coinage Offences Act 1832; Forestalling, Regrating, etc. Act 1844
Repealed by	England and Wales: Statute Law Revision Act 1863; Ireland: Statute Law (Ireland) Revision Act 1872
Relates to	Recognizances for Debt Act 1532, c. 6; Fraudulent Conveyances Act 1584, c. 4

Status: Repealed

Text of statute as originally enacted

The Ordinance of the Staple (27 Edw. 3. Stat. 2) was an ordinance issued in the Great Council in October 1353. It aimed to regularise the status of staple ports in England, Wales, and Ireland. In particular, it designated particular ports where specific goods could be exported or imported. These were called the 'staple ports'. It also established dedicated courts, known as the courts of staple, where disputes relating to commercial matters could be heard, in preference to the courts of common law.

There were two immediately prior assemblies in August 1352 and July 1353 at which it is thought the matter of staples was discussed. The scheme for home town staples was vetted by the more parliamentary assembly in September 1353. Royal officials had already been appointed on 10 July 1353 to run the scheme when the parliament of 1354 confirmed the new scheme by the act of Parliament. The previous act in 1326 had given the Staple towns legal definition, but the new piece of legislation broadened and widened their trading privileges. The Act facilitated mercantile credit to promote trade (which, supported by a sympathetic King Edward, was also the constitutional duty of the Commons). It highlighted the weakness of 14th-century debt system, and the need to regulate trade to improve liquidity, after the economic crisis caused by the Black Death.

The staple towns named in the statute were at Newcastle upon Tyne, York, Lincoln, Norwich, Westminster, Canterbury, Chichester, Winchester, Exeter, and Bristol, in England, as well as Dublin, Waterford, Cork, and Drogheda in Ireland. In Wales, the designated staple town was Carmarthen. From 1368, the wool staple was transferred away from Canterbury to Queenborough, in Kent.

In 1363, the merchants from the staples of York and Bristol founded a new staple at Calais. The merchants had established a near monopoly, and in 1353 were banned from exporting to England. In response, in collaboration with the English Crown, the merchants' guilds of these two well-established centers decided to organize a new wool market center in Bruges. They persistently petitioned parliament to establish "the freedom of trade" in cloth to Flanders, as a matter of principle. Conveniently, the last Bruges monopoly company had been declared bankrupt in 1351. King Edward, whose queen came from Hainault, wished for a diplomatic, commercial, and military alliance against France. The Burgesses of the Commons welcomed the King's interest and approved the transfer of trading rights to Bruges. The collapse of available labour supply increased awareness of trade regulation and the need to control fraud, which implied for England the imposition of customs duties at given ports. In the interest of "the community realm" the Chief Justice designated it in the interest of the common law that free trade flourish.

== Subsequent developments ==
The act was extended to Ireland by Poynings' Law 1495 (10 Hen. 7. c. 22 (I)).

The whole act was repealed for England and Wales by section 1 of, and the schedule to, the Statute Law Revision Act 1863 (26 & 27 Vict. c. 125), which came into force on 28 July 1863.

The whole act was repealed for Ireland by section 1 of, and the schedule to, the Statute Law (Ireland) Revision Act 1872 (35 & 36 Vict. c. 98), which came into force on 10 August 1872.

== See also ==
- The Staple, for the medieval use of the term
- Chapter 10, dealing with measurement fraud
