= Importation Act 1455 =

Act of the Parliament of England

- Act of Parliament
- Parliament of England
- Long title: No wrought silk belonging to the mystery of silkwomen shall be brought into this realm by the way of merchandise, during five years.
- Citation: 33 Hen. 6. c. 5
- Territorial extent: England and Wales; Ireland

Dates
- Royal assent: 1456
- Commencement: 28 March 1456 (Note: The Feast of Easter (OS).)
- Repealed: 24 June 1822

Other legislation
- Repealed by: Repeal of Acts Concerning Importation Act 1822
- Relates to: Statute Law Revision Act 1863; Statute Law (Ireland) Revision Act 1872

Status: Repealed

Text of statute as originally enacted

The Importation Act 1455 (33 Hen. 6. c. 5) was an act of the Parliament of England of passed during the reign of Henry VI.

In 1455, London silkwomen complained that the Lombards were importing "ribbands and chains, falsely and deceitfully wrought, all manner girdles and other things concerning the said mistery and occupation, in no manner wise bringing in any good silk unwrought as they were wont to bring heretofore". Parliament therefore passed the Importation Act 1455 prohibiting the importation of these goods, with punishments of forfeiture and considerable fines.

== Subsequent developments ==
The act was extended to Ireland by Poynings' Law 1495 (10 Hen. 7. c. 22 (I)).

The whole act was repealed by section 1 of the Repeal of Acts Concerning Importation Act 1822 (3 Geo. 4. c. 41).

The whole of 33 Hen. 6, including this act (which had already been repealed), was repealed for England and Wales by section 1 of, and the schedule to, the Statute Law Revision Act 1863 (26 & 27 Vict. c. 125), which came into force on 28 July 1863.

The whole of 33 Hen. 6, including this act (which had already been repealed), was repealed for Ireland by section 1 of, and the schedule to, the Statute Law (Ireland) Revision Act 1872 (35 & 36 Vict. c. 98), which came into force on 10 August 1872.
