= List of acts of the Parliament of England from 1464 =

This is a list of acts of the Parliament of England for the year 1464.

For acts passed during the period 1707–1800, see the list of acts of the Parliament of Great Britain. See also the list of acts of the Parliament of Scotland, and the list of acts of the Parliament of Ireland.

For acts passed from 1801 onwards, see the list of acts of the Parliament of the United Kingdom. For acts of the devolved parliaments and assemblies in the United Kingdom, see the list of acts of the Scottish Parliament, the list of acts of the Northern Ireland Assembly, and the list of acts and measures of Senedd Cymru; see also the list of acts of the Parliament of Northern Ireland.

For medieval statutes, etc. that are not considered to be acts of Parliament, see the list of English statutes.

See also the List of ordinances and acts of the Parliament of England, 1642–1660 for ordinances and acts passed by the Long Parliament and other bodies without royal assent, and which were not considered to be valid legislation following the Restoration in 1660.

The number shown after each act's title is its chapter number. Acts are cited using this number, preceded by the years of the reign during which the relevant parliamentary session was held; thus the Union with Ireland Act 1800 is cited as "39 & 40 Geo. 3. c. 67", meaning the 67th act passed during the session that started in the 39th year of the reign of George III and which finished in the 40th year of that reign. The modern convention is to use Arabic numerals in citations (thus "41 Geo. 3" rather than "41 Geo. III"). Acts of the last session of the Parliament of Great Britain and the first session of the Parliament of the United Kingdom are both cited as "41 Geo. 3".

Acts passed by the Parliament of England did not have a short title; however, some of these acts have subsequently been given a short title by acts of the Parliament of the United Kingdom, such as the Short Titles Act 1896 (59 & 60 Vict. c. 14).

Acts passed by the Parliament of England were deemed to have come into effect on the first day of the session in which they were passed. Because of this, the years given in the list below may in fact be the year before a particular act was passed.

== 4 Edw. 4 ==
The second session of the 2nd Parliament of King Edward IV, which met at Westminster from 21 January 1464 until 28 March 1465.

This session was also traditionally cited as 4 Ed. 4 or 4 E. 4.

Short title	Citation	Royal assent
Long title
Cloths Act 1464 (repealed)	4 Edw. 4. c. 1	28 March 1465
The length and breadth of cloths to be made. (Note: Required a lead seal with a stamp on both sides showing the sign of the county, city or borough where it was made, its length, and faults to be marked with another – 'a seal of lead shall be hanged on the lowest part of the edge thereof' ... Broad cloth to be 24 yds with a man's inch to be added for every yard 'measured by the chest' and in breadth 2 yds or 7 quarters at the least within the lifts. It is still known to measure a rough yard from centre of chest to hand unfolding the cloth.) (Repealed for England and Wales by Statute Law Revision Act 1863 (26 & 27 Vict. c. 125) and for Ireland by Statute Law (Ireland) Revision Act 1872 (35 & 36 Vict. c. 98))
Export of Wool Act 1464 (repealed)	4 Edw. 4. c. 2	28 March 1465
From what places, and on what conditions, English wools shall be exported to Calais. (Repealed by Repeal of Acts Concerning Importation Act 1822 (3 Geo. 4. c. 41))
Exportation (Newcastle) Act 1464 (repealed)	4 Edw. 4. c. 3	28 March 1465
Certain wools, fells, &c. which may be exported from Newcastle to the staple of Calais. Penalty on those who do contrary to this ordinance. (Repealed by Repeal of Acts Concerning Importation Act 1822 (3 Geo. 4. c. 41))
Contracting for Wool Act 1464 (repealed)	4 Edw. 4. c. 4	28 March 1465
A restraint for three years on the custom of contracting for wool in certain counties before it is shorn, unless it be used for cloth or yarn. (Repealed for England and Wales by Statute Law Revision Act 1863 (26 & 27 Vict. c. 125) and for Ireland by Statute Law (Ireland) Revision Act 1872 (35 & 36 Vict. c. 98))
Importation Act 1464 (repealed)	4 Edw. 4. c. 5	28 March 1465
Merchandises from the duke of Burgundy's countries prohibited, till English wrought cloths are received there. (Repealed for England and Wales by Statute Law Revision Act 1863 (26 & 27 Vict. c. 125) and for Ireland by Statute Law (Ireland) Revision Act 1872 (35 & 36 Vict. c. 98))
Foreign Merchants Act 1464 (repealed)	4 Edw. 4. c. 6	28 March 1465
A qualification of the statute of 5 Hen. IV. cap. 9. (Note: Trade Act 1403 (5 Hen. 4. c. 9)) touching security to be taken of merchants strangers for the employment of their money upon the commodities of this realm. (Repealed by Repeal of Acts Concerning Importation Act 1822 (3 Geo. 4. c. 41))
Shoemakers Act 1464 (repealed)	4 Edw. 4. c. 7	28 March 1465
Regulations to be observed by shoemakers of London, and those within three miles of the same. The privileges of the inhabitants of St. Martin's le Grant saved. (Repealed for England and Wales by Statute Law Revision Act 1863 (26 & 27 Vict. c. 125) and for Ireland by Statute Law (Ireland) Revision Act 1872 (35 & 36 Vict. c. 98))
Horn Act 1464 (repealed)	4 Edw. 4. c. 8	28 March 1465
No stranger shall buy English horns unwrought, gathered or growing in London, or within twenty four miles thereof. Certain powers vested in the wardens of the horners of London. (Repealed for England and Wales by Statute Law Revision Act 1863 (26 & 27 Vict. c. 125) and for Ireland by Statute Law (Ireland) Revision Act 1872 (35 & 36 Vict. c. 98))
Pattens Act 1464 (repealed)	4 Edw. 4. c. 9	28 March 1465
Patten-makers may make pattens of such asp as is not fit for shafts. (Repealed for England and Wales by Continuance, etc. of Laws Act 1603 (1 Jas. 1. c. 25) and for Ireland by Statute Law (Ireland) Revision Act 1872 (35 & 36 Vict. c. 98))
Passage at Dover Act 1464 (repealed)	4 Edw. 4. c. 10	28 March 1465
What persons shall take passage or land at Dover in Kent only, and who not. (Repealed for England and Wales by Continuance, etc. of Laws Act 1623 (21 Jas. 1. c. 28) and for Ireland by Statute Law (Ireland) Revision Act 1872 (35 & 36 Vict. c. 98))

=== Sources ===
- "4° Edw. IV.". The Statutes of the Realm. Vol. 2: 1377 to 1509. pp. 403–418 – via HathiTrust.
- "Anno quarto Edwardi IV". The Statutes at Large. Vol. 3 – 1 Henry V to 22 Edward IV – 1413 to 1482–3. Printed by J. Bentham. 16 April 1762. pp. 364–386 – via Internet Archive.
- "Anno quarto Edwardi IV". The Statutes at Large. Vol. 3 – 1 Henry V to 22 Edward IV – 1413 to 1482–3. C. Eyre and A. Strahan. 16 April 1762. pp. 364–386 – via Internet Archive.
- Chronological Table of and Index to the Statutes. Vol. 1: To the End of the Session 59 Vict. Sess. 2 (1895) (13th ed.). London: Her Majesty's Stationery Office. 1896. p. 39 – via Google Books.
- Chronological Table of the Statutes: Covering the Period from 1235 to the End of 1971. London: Her Majesty's Stationery Office. 1972. p. 33. ISBN 978-0-11-840096-1 – via Google Books.

== See also ==
- List of acts of the Parliament of England
