= Importation Act =

Importation Act may refer to:

- Importation Act 1337, an act of the Parliament of England prohibiting the importation of foreign made cloth
- Importation Act 1455, an act of the Parliament of England prohibiting the importation of items sold by silkwomen
- Importation Act 1463, an act of the Parliament of England to support domestic British corn prices
- Importation Act 1482, an act of the Parliament of England prohibiting the importation of foreign made silk
- Importation Act 1562, an act of the Parliament of England prohibiting the importation of manufactured goods used in military equipment
- Importation Act 1666, an act of the Parliament of England prohibiting the importation of Irish cattle
- Importation Act 1667, an act of the Parliament of England which banned Irish cattle from being sold in England
- Importation Act 1685, an act of the Parliament of England repealing the Prohibition of 1678 which banned the import of French commodities
- Importation Act 1815, a tariff designed to support domestic British corn prices against competition from less expensive foreign-grain imports
- Importation Act 1822, an act of the Parliament of England to support domestic British corn prices
- Importation Act 1846, a repeal of Importation Act 1815 (Corn Laws)
- Act Prohibiting Importation of Slaves (1807), a United States federal law that stated that no new slaves were permitted to be imported into the United States

== See also ==
- Non-importation Act
