= Importation of Silk Act 1463 =

Act of the Parliament of England

- Act of Parliament
- Parliament of England
- Long title: Whosoever shall bring into this realm any wrought silk to be sold, concerning the mystery of silk-workers, shall forfeit the same, and x. li.
- Citation: 3 Edw. 4. c. 3
- Territorial extent: England and Wales; Ireland

Dates
- Royal assent: 29 April 1463
- Commencement: 29 April 1463 (Note: The Feast of Saint Peter in Chains.)
- Repealed: 24 June 1822

Other legislation
- Repealed by: Repeal of Acts Concerning Importation Act 1822
- Relates to: Exportation Act 1463; Importation Act 1463; Importation (No. 2) Act 1463; Statute Law Revision Act 1863; Statute Law (Ireland) Revision Act 1872

Status: Repealed

Text of statute as originally enacted

The Importation of Silk Act 1463 (3 Edw. 4. c. 3) was an act of the Parliament of England passed during the reign of Edward IV that prohibited the importation of foreign-made silk in order to protect the English silk industry located in London.

== Subsequent developments ==
The act was extended to Ireland by Poynings' Law 1495 (10 Hen. 7. c. 22 (I)).

The whole act was repealed by section 1 of the Repeal of Acts Concerning Importation Act 1822 (3 Geo. 4. c. 41).

The whole of 3 Edw. 4, including this act (which had already been repealed), was repealed for England and Wales by section 1 of, and the schedule to, the Statute Law Revision Act 1863 (26 & 27 Vict. c. 125), which came into force on 28 July 1863.

The whole of 3 Edw. 4, including this act (which had already been repealed), was repealed for Ireland by section 1 of, and the schedule to, the Statute Law (Ireland) Revision Act 1872 (35 & 36 Vict. c. 98), which came into force on 10 August 1872.
