= List of acts of the Parliament of England from 1483 =

This is a list of acts of the Parliament of England for the year 1483.

For acts passed during the period 1707–1800, see the list of acts of the Parliament of Great Britain. See also the list of acts of the Parliament of Scotland, and the list of acts of the Parliament of Ireland.

For acts passed from 1801 onwards, see the list of acts of the Parliament of the United Kingdom. For acts of the devolved parliaments and assemblies in the United Kingdom, see the list of acts of the Scottish Parliament, the list of acts of the Northern Ireland Assembly, and the list of acts and measures of Senedd Cymru; see also the list of acts of the Parliament of Northern Ireland.

For medieval statutes, etc. that are not considered to be acts of Parliament, see the list of English statutes.

See also the List of ordinances and acts of the Parliament of England, 1642–1660 for ordinances and acts passed by the Long Parliament and other bodies without royal assent, and which were not considered to be valid legislation following the Restoration in 1660.

The number shown after each act's title is its chapter number. Acts are cited using this number, preceded by the years of the reign during which the relevant parliamentary session was held; thus the Union with Ireland Act 1800 is cited as "39 & 40 Geo. 3. c. 67", meaning the 67th act passed during the session that started in the 39th year of the reign of George III and which finished in the 40th year of that reign. The modern convention is to use Arabic numerals in citations (thus "41 Geo. 3" rather than "41 Geo. III"). Acts of the last session of the Parliament of Great Britain and the first session of the Parliament of the United Kingdom are both cited as "41 Geo. 3".

Acts passed by the Parliament of England did not have a short title; however, some of these acts have subsequently been given a short title by acts of the Parliament of the United Kingdom, such as the Short Titles Act 1896 (59 & 60 Vict. c. 14).

Acts passed by the Parliament of England were deemed to have come into effect on the first day of the session in which they were passed. Because of this, the years given in the list below may in fact be the year before a particular act was passed.

== 1 Ric. 3 ==
The Parliament of King Richard III, which met at Westminster from 23 January 1484 until 20 February 1484.

This session was also traditionally cited as 1 R. 3 or 1 Rich. 3.

Short title	Citation	Royal assent
Long title
Titulus Regius (Note: This enactment is not listed in the Chronological Table of the Statutes.) (repealed)	1 Ric. 3. c. 0	20 February 1484
Under which title all the reasons and allegations divised to prove the King to be true and undoubted heir to the crown, are set forth at large, and the same allowed, ratified; and enacted by the lords and commons; and his brothers children made bastards. (Repealed by Title of the King (1 Hen. 7. part preceding c. 1))
Feoffments to Uses Act 1483 (repealed)	1 Ric. 3. c. 1	20 February 1484
An Act agaynst pryvy and unknowen Feoffements. (Repealed for England and Wales by Statute Law Revision Act 1863 (26 & 27 Vict. c. 125) and for Ireland by Statute Law (Ireland) Revision Act 1872 (35 & 36 Vict. c. 98))
Benevolences Act 1483 (repealed)	1 Ric. 3. c. 2	20 February 1484
An Act to free the Subjects from Benevolences. (Repealed for England and Wales by Statute Law Revision Act 1863 (26 & 27 Vict. c. 125) and for Ireland by Statute Law (Ireland) Revision Act 1872 (35 & 36 Vict. c. 98))
Felony Act 1483 (repealed)	1 Ric. 3. c. 3	20 February 1484
An Act for baylyng of persons suspected of Felony. (Repealed for England and Wales by Criminal Law Act 1826 (7 Geo. 4 c. 64) and for Ireland by Criminal Statutes (Ireland) Repeal Act 1828 (9 Geo. 4. c. 53))
Sheriff's Tourns Act 1483 (repealed)	1 Ric. 3. c. 4	20 February 1484
An Act for retornynge of sufficient Jurors. (Repealed for England and Wales by Juries Act 1825 (6 Geo. 4. c. 50) and for Ireland by Juries (Ireland) Act 1833 (3 & 4 Will. 4. c. 91))
Feoffee to Uses Act 1483 (repealed)	1 Ric. 3. c. 5	20 February 1484
An Act touching the Feoffment made to the Kynge to the use of others. (Repealed for England and Wales by Statute Law Revision Act 1863 (26 & 27 Vict. c. 125) and for Ireland by Statute Law (Ireland) Revision Act 1872 (35 & 36 Vict. c. 98))
Courts of Pyepowder Act 1483 (repealed)	1 Ric. 3. c. 6	20 February 1484
An Act for tryall of matters in Courtes of Pypowder held in fayres. (Repealed by Statute Law Revision Act 1948 (11 & 12 Geo. 6. c. 62))
Fines Act 1483 (repealed)	1 Ric. 3. c. 7	20 February 1484
An Act for proclamacion uppon Fynes levyed. (Repealed for England and Wales by Statute Law Revision Act 1863 (26 & 27 Vict. c. 125) and for Ireland by Statute Law (Ireland) Revision Act 1872 (35 & 36 Vict. c. 98))
Cloths Act 1483 (repealed)	1 Ric. 3. c. 8	20 February 1484
An Act touching the order of dyinge and of Wolls and Clothes. (Repealed by Woollen Manufacture Act 1809 (49 Geo. 3. c. 109))
Aliens Act 1483 (repealed)	1 Ric. 3. c. 9	20 February 1484
An Act touchinge the Marchaunts of Italy. (Repealed by Repeal of Acts Concerning Importation Act 1822 (3 Geo. 4. c. 41))
Importations Act 1483 (repealed)	1 Ric. 3. c. 10	20 February 1484
An Act touchinge the bringing in of Silke Lacs Ribands, &c. (Note: Importation Act 1482 (22 Edw. 4. c. 3) prohibiting wrought laces of silk to be brought into this realm, continued for ten years.) (Repealed by Repeal of Acts Concerning Importation Act 1822 (3 Geo. 4. c. 41))
Bowstaves Act 1483 (repealed)	1 Ric. 3. c. 11	20 February 1484
An Act touchinge Bowyers. (Repealed by Repeal of Acts Concerning Importation Act 1822 (3 Geo. 4. c. 41))
Importation Act 1483 (repealed)	1 Ric. 3. c. 12	20 February 1484
An Act agaynst Straungers Artificers. (Repealed by Importation (No. 4) Act 1816 (56 Geo. 3. c. 36), confirmed by Repeal of Acts Concerning Importation Act 1822 (3 Geo. 4. c. 41))
Vessels of Wine, etc. Act 1483 (repealed)	1 Ric. 3. c. 13	20 February 1484
An Act for the Contents of a Butt of Malmesey. (Repealed by Repeal of Acts Concerning Importation Act 1822 (3 Geo. 4. c. 41) and Weights and Measures Act 1824 (5 Geo. 4. c. 74))
Collector of Dismes Act 1483 (repealed)	1 Ric. 3. c. 14	20 February 1484
An Act for Dysmes graunted in the provinces of Canterbury and York. (Repealed for England and Wales by Statute Law Revision Act 1863 (26 & 27 Vict. c. 125) and for Ireland by Statute Law (Ireland) Revision Act 1872 (35 & 36 Vict. c. 98))
Letters Patent to the late Queen Annulled Act 1483 (repealed)	1 Ric. 3. c. 15	20 February 1484
An Acte for adnullinge letters patentes made to Elizabeth late Wyfe of Sir Jo. Grey. (Repealed by Statute Law Revision Act 1948 (11 & 12 Geo. 6. c. 62))

=== Sources ===
- "1° Ric. III.". The Statutes of the Realm. Vol. 2: 1377 to 1509. pp. 477–498 – via HathiTrust.
- "Anno primo Richardi III". The Statutes at Large. Vol. 4 - 1 Richard III to 31 Henry VIII - 1483-4 to 1539. pp. 1–21 – via Internet Archive.
- "Anno primo Richardi III". The Statutes at Large. Vol. 4 - 1 Richard III to 31 Henry VIII - 1483-4 to 1539. pp. 1–21 – via Internet Archive.
- "Anno primo Richardi III". The Statutes at Large. Vol. 4 - 1 Richard III to 31 Henry VIII - 1483-4 to 1539. pp. 1–21 – via Internet Archive.
- Chronological Table of and Index to the Statutes. Vol. 1: To the End of the Session 59 Vict. Sess. 2 (1895) (13th ed.). London: Her Majesty's Stationery Office. 1896. pp. 39–40 – via Google Books.
- Chronological Table of the Statutes: Covering the Period from 1235 to the End of 1971. London: Her Majesty's Stationery Office. 1972. p. 34. ISBN 978-0-11-840096-1 – via Google Books.

== See also ==
- List of acts of the Parliament of England
