= Importation Act 1463 =

Act of the Parliament of England

- Act of Parliament
- Parliament of England
- Long title: A restraint of bringing corn into this realm, until it shall exceed certain prices.
- Citation: 3 Edw. 4. c. 2
- Territorial extent: England and Wales; Ireland

Dates
- Royal assent: 29 April 1463
- Commencement: 1 August 1463 (Note: The Feast of Saint Peter in Chains.)
- Expired: 1 August 1468 (Note: 5 years.)
- Repealed: England and Wales: 19 February 1624; Ireland: 10 August 1872
Other legislation
Repealed by	England and Wales: Continuance, etc. of Laws Act 1623; Ireland: Statute Law (Ireland) Revision Act 1872
Relates to	Exportation Act 1463; Importation of Silk Act 1463; Importation (No. 2) Act 1463; Statute Law Revision Act 1863

Status: Repealed

Text of statute as originally enacted

The Importation Act 1463 (3 Edw. 4. c. 2) was an act of the Parliament of England passed during the reign of Edward IV.

Merchants of the Hanseatic League resident in England were importing a large amount of corn. Parliament therefore passed the Importation Act to prohibit the importation of corn when the price of wheat at the port at which it was purchased did not exceed 6s. 8d. per quarter. This was done to relieve the condition of labourers and to raise the price of English-grown corn.

== Subsequent developments ==
The act was extended to Ireland by Poynings' Law 1495 (10 Hen. 7. c. 22 (I)).

The whole act was repealed for England and Wales by section 11 of the Continuance, etc. of Laws Act 1623 (21 Jas. 1. c. 28), which came into force on 19 February 1624.

The whole of 3 Edw. 4, including this act (which had already been repealed), was repealed for England and Wales by section 1 of, and the schedule to, the Statute Law Revision Act 1863 (26 & 27 Vict. c. 125), which came into force on 28 July 1863.

The whole of 3 Edw. 4, including this act (which had already been repealed), was repealed for Ireland by section 1 of, and the schedule to, the Statute Law (Ireland) Revision Act 1872 (35 & 36 Vict. c. 98), which came into force on 10 August 1872.
