= Cloth Act 1337 =

Act of the Parliament of England

- Act of Parliament
- Parliament of England
- Long title: None shall wear any Cloth but such as is made in England.
- Citation: 11 Edw. 3. c. 2
- Territorial extent: United Kingdom

Dates
- Royal assent: 1337
- Commencement: 27 September 1337 (Note: Start of session.)
- Repealed: England and Wales: 28 July 1863; Ireland: 10 August 1872

Other legislation
- Amended by: Repeal of Acts Concerning Importation Act 1822
- Repealed by: England and Wales: Statute Law Revision Act 1863; Ireland: Statute Law (Ireland) Revision Act 1872
- Relates to: Importation Act 1337

Status: Repealed

Text of statute as originally enacted

The Cloth Act 1337 (11 Edw. 3. c. 2) was an act of the Parliament of England passed during the reign of Edward III.

The act legally obliged all English people to wear English-made cloth. It was part of a group of Sumptuary Laws intended to preserve class distinctions.

== Text ==
Item, it is accorded, That no Man nor Woman great nor small of England, Ireland, nor Wales, nor of our Sovereign Lord the King's Power in Scotland, of what Estate or Condition he be, the King, Queen, and their Children only except, shall wear no Cloth, which shall be bought after the Feast of Saint Michael next Coming, Other than is made in England, Ireland, Wales, or Scotland within the King's Power, upon Pain of Forfeiture of the same Cloth, and further to be punished at the King's Will. And that in the said Lands of England, Ireland, Wales and Scotland within the King's Power, a Man may make the Clothes as long and as short as a Man will.

== Subsequent developments ==
The act was extended to Ireland by Poynings' Law 1495 (10 Hen. 7. c. 22 (I)).

The provisions of the act providing "What clothes may be worn" were repealed by section 1 of the Repeal of Acts Concerning Importation Act 1822 (3 Geo. 4. c. 41), which came into force on 24 June 1822.

The whole act was repealed for England and Wales by section 1 of, and the schedule to, the Statute Law Revision Act 1863 (26 & 27 Vict. c. 125), which came into force on 28 July 1863.

The whole act was repealed for Ireland by section 1 of, and the schedule to, the Statute Law (Ireland) Revision Act 1872 (35 & 36 Vict. c. 98), which came into force on 10 August 1872.
