= Importation (No. 4) Act 1816 =

Act of the Parliament of the United Kingdom

- Act of Parliament
- Parliament of the United Kingdom
- Long title: An act to repeal Two Acts passed in the Reign of King Edward the Fourth and King Richard the Third, which prohibit the Importation of Wrought Goods and certain other Articles.
- Citation: 56 Geo. 3. c. 36
- Introduced by: Stephen Lushington MP (Commons)
- Territorial extent: United Kingdom

Dates
- Royal assent: 21 May 1816
- Commencement: 21 May 1816 (Note: The Acts of Parliament (Commencement) Act 1793.)
- Repealed: 5 August 1873
Other legislation
Amends	See § Repealed enactments
Repeals/revokes	Importation (No. 2) Act 1463; Importation Act 1483
Repealed by	Statute Law Revision Act 1873
Relates to	Repeal of Acts Concerning Importation Act 1822

Status: Repealed

Text of statute as originally enacted

The Importation (No. 4) Act 1816 (56 Geo. 3. c. 36) was an act of the Parliament of the United Kingdom that repealed the Importation (No. 2) Act 1463 (3 Edw. 4. c. 3) and the Importation Act 1483 (1 Ric. 3. c. 12).

== Passage ==
The Importation (No. 2) Act 1463 (3 Edw. 4. c. 3) and the Importation Act 1483 (1 Ric. 3. c. 12) were read and committed to a committee of the whole house on 25 April 1816, which met on 26 April 1816 and reported on 29 April 1816, resolving that it was expedient to repeal the two acts and that James Brogden MP and Stephen Lushington MP should bring prepare and bring in a bill to do so.

The Wrought Goods Importation Bill had its first reading in the House of Commons on 30 April 1816, presented by the Stephen Lushington MP. The bill had its second reading in the House of Commons on 1 May 1816 and was committed to a committee of the whole house, which met on 3 May 1816 and reported on 6 May 1816, with amendments. The amended bill had its third reading in the House of Commons on 8 May 1816 and passed, without amendments.

The bill had its first reading in the House of Lords on 8 May 1816. The bill had its second reading in the House of Lords on 9 May 1816 and was committed to a committee of the whole house, which met and reported on 10 May 1816, without amendments. The amended bill had its third reading in the House of Lords on 13 May 1816 and passed, without amendments.

The bill was granted royal assent on 21 May 1816.

== Subsequent developments ==
The Importation (No. 2) Act 1463 (3 Edw. 4. c. 3) and the Importation Act 1483 (1 Ric. 3. c. 12) were declared to be repealed by the Repeal of Acts Concerning Importation Act 1822 (3 Geo. 4. c. 41).

The whole of 3 Edw. 4, including the Importation (No. 2) Act 1463 (c. 3) which was already repealed, was repealed for England and Wales by section 1 of, and the schedule to, the Statute Law Revision Act 1863 (26 & 27 Vict. c. 125), which came into force on 28 July 1863. and for Ireland by section 1 of, and the schedule to, the Statute Law (Ireland) Revision Act 1872 (35 & 36 Vict. c. 98), which came into force on 10 August 1872.

The whole act was repealed by section 1 of, and the schedule to, the Statute Law Revision Act 1873 (36 & 37 Vict. c. 91), which came into force on 5 August 1873.
