= Importation Act 1337 =

Act of the Parliament of England

- Act of Parliament
- Parliament of England
- Long title: No Clothes made beyond the Seas shall be brought into the King's Dominions.
- Citation: 11 Edw. 3. c. 3
- Territorial extent: United Kingdom

Dates
- Royal assent: 1337
- Commencement: 27 September 1337 (Note: Start of session.)
- Repealed: 24 June 1822

Other legislation
- Repealed by: Repeal of Acts Concerning Importation Act 1822
- Relates to: Cloth Act 1337

Status: Repealed

Text of statute as originally enacted

The Importation Act 1337 (11 Edw. 3. c. 3) was an act of the Parliament of England passed during the reign of Edward III that prohibited the importation of foreign made cloth in order to encourage the English cloth making industry.

== Text ==
Item it is accorded and established, That, no Merchant, foreign nor Denizen, nor none other, after the said Feast of St. Michael shall bring or cause to be brought privily nor apertly, by himself nor by other, into the said Lands of England, Ireland, Wales, and Scotland, within the King's Power, any Clothes made in any other Places than, in the same, upon the Forfeiture of the said Clothes, and further to be punished at the King's Will.

== Subsequent developments ==
The act was extended to Ireland by Poynings' Law 1495 (10 Hen. 7. c. 22 (I)).

The whole act was repealed by section 1 of the Repeal of Acts Concerning Importation Act 1822 (3 Geo. 4. c. 41), which came into force on 24 June 1822.
