= Importation Act 1482 =

Act of the Parliament of England

Importation of Silk Act 1482
- Act of Parliament
- Parliament of England
- Long title: An Act concerning silk workers.
- Citation: 22 Edw. 4. c. 3
- Territorial extent: England and Wales; Ireland

Dates
- Royal assent: 18 February 1483
- Commencement: 30 March 1483 (Note: The Feast of Easter (OS).)
- Repealed: 24 June 1822
Other legislation
Amended by	Importations Act 1483
Repealed by	Repeal of Acts Concerning Importation Act 1822

Status: Repealed

Text of statute as originally enacted

Importations Act 1483
- Act of Parliament
- Parliament of England
- Long title: The statute of 22 Edward 4. c. 3. prohibiting wrought laces of silk to be brought into this realm, continued for ten years.
- Citation: 1 Ric. 3. c. 10
- Territorial extent: England and Wales; Ireland

Dates
- Royal assent: 20 February 1484
- Commencement: 23 January 1484 (Note: Start of session.)
- Repealed: 24 June 1822
Other legislation
Amends	Importation of Silk Act 1482
Repealed by	Repeal of Acts Concerning Importation Act 1822

Status: Repealed

Text of statute as originally enacted

The Importation of Silk Act 1482 (22 Edw. 4. c. 3) was an act of the Parliament of England passed during the reign of Edward IV.

The act prohibited the importation of foreign-made silk in order to protect the English silk industry.

== Subsequent developments ==
The act was extended by 10 years by the Importations Act 1483 (1 Ric. 3. c. 10).

The act was extended to Ireland by Poynings' Law 1495 (10 Hen. 7. c. 22 (I)).

The whole act was repealed by section 1 of the Repeal of Acts Concerning Importation Act 1822 (3 Geo. 4. c. 41).
