= False Imprisonment Act 1410 =

Act of the Parliament of Ireland

False Imprisonment Act 1410 (Note: Short title given by the Statute Law Revision Act 2007 (No. 28))
- Act of Parliament
- Parliament of Ireland
- Long title: None to be arrested without warrant.
- Citation: List of acts of the Parliament of Ireland, 1400–1499#11 Hen. 4. c. 15 (I)
- Territorial extent: Ireland

Dates
- Royal assent: 1410
- Commencement: 1410

Other legislation
- Relates to: Statute Law Revision Act 2007

Status: Amended

Text of statute as originally enacted

The False Imprisonment Act 1410 List of acts of the Parliament of Ireland, 1400–1499#11 Hen. 4. c. 15 (I)) is an act passed by the Parliament of Ireland in 1410, during the reign of Henry IV as Lord of Ireland. The act covered false imprisonment.

The Bill reqnereth that the mshalls Shereeffs Bayliffs Sariantes & other officers, nor theire deputyes shalnot from heneferth take or areste anie man by color of there offices without shewinge sufficient warrante or warrantes, nor shall take nothinge of them, but there fees dwe and taxed by the lawe. And yf anye officer doe the contrarie hearvn to y' the ptie greeved may have remedye by tras or false impsonment.
The Governor is pleased.
