= Tennis ball =

Ball used in the sport of tennis

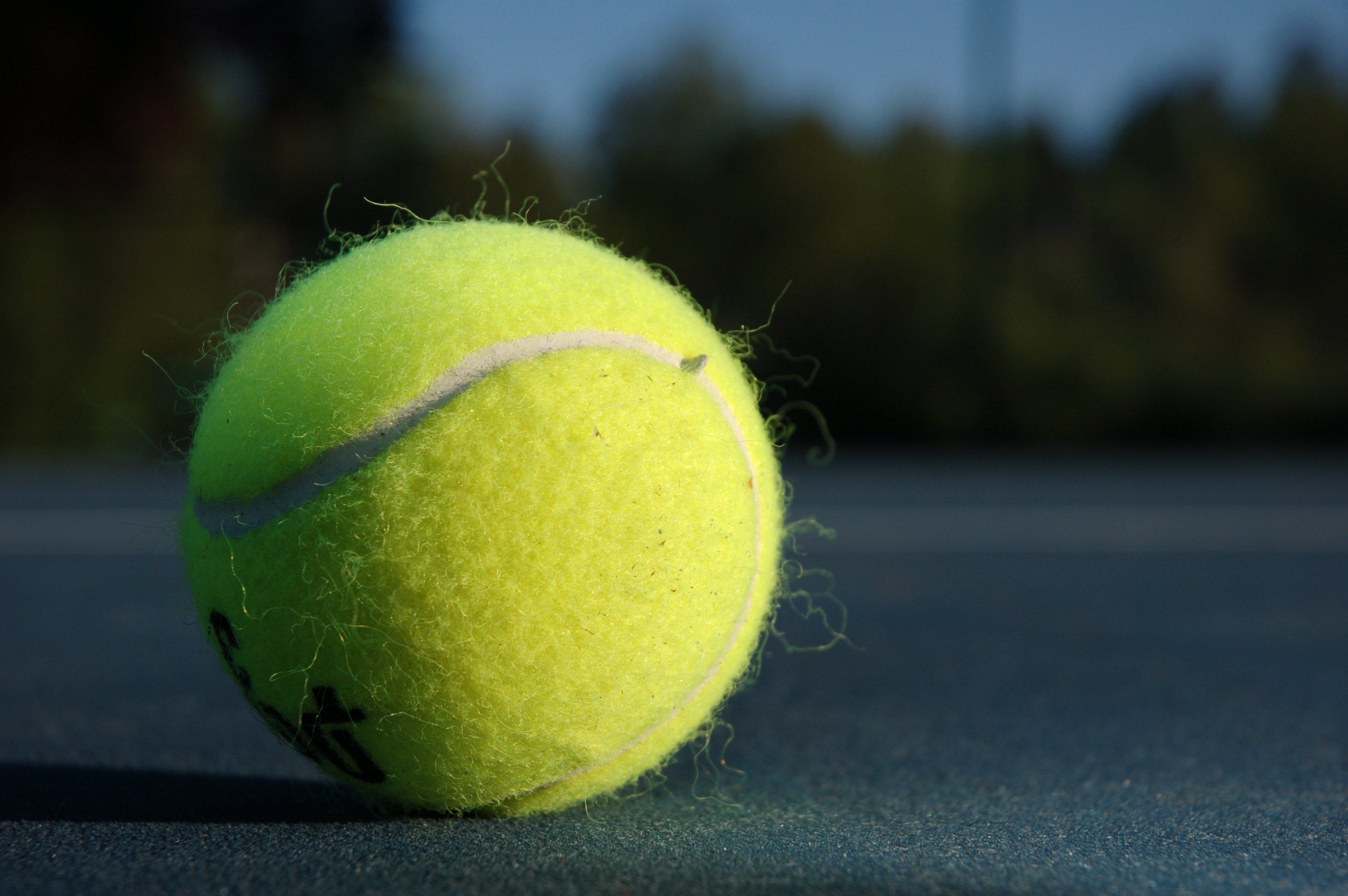
A Penn tennis ball

A tennis ball is a small, hollow ball used in games of tennis and real tennis. Tennis balls are fluorescent yellow in professional competitions, but in recreational play other colors are also used. Tennis balls are covered in a fibrous felt, which modifies their aerodynamic properties, and each has a white curvilinear oval covering it.

== Specifications ==
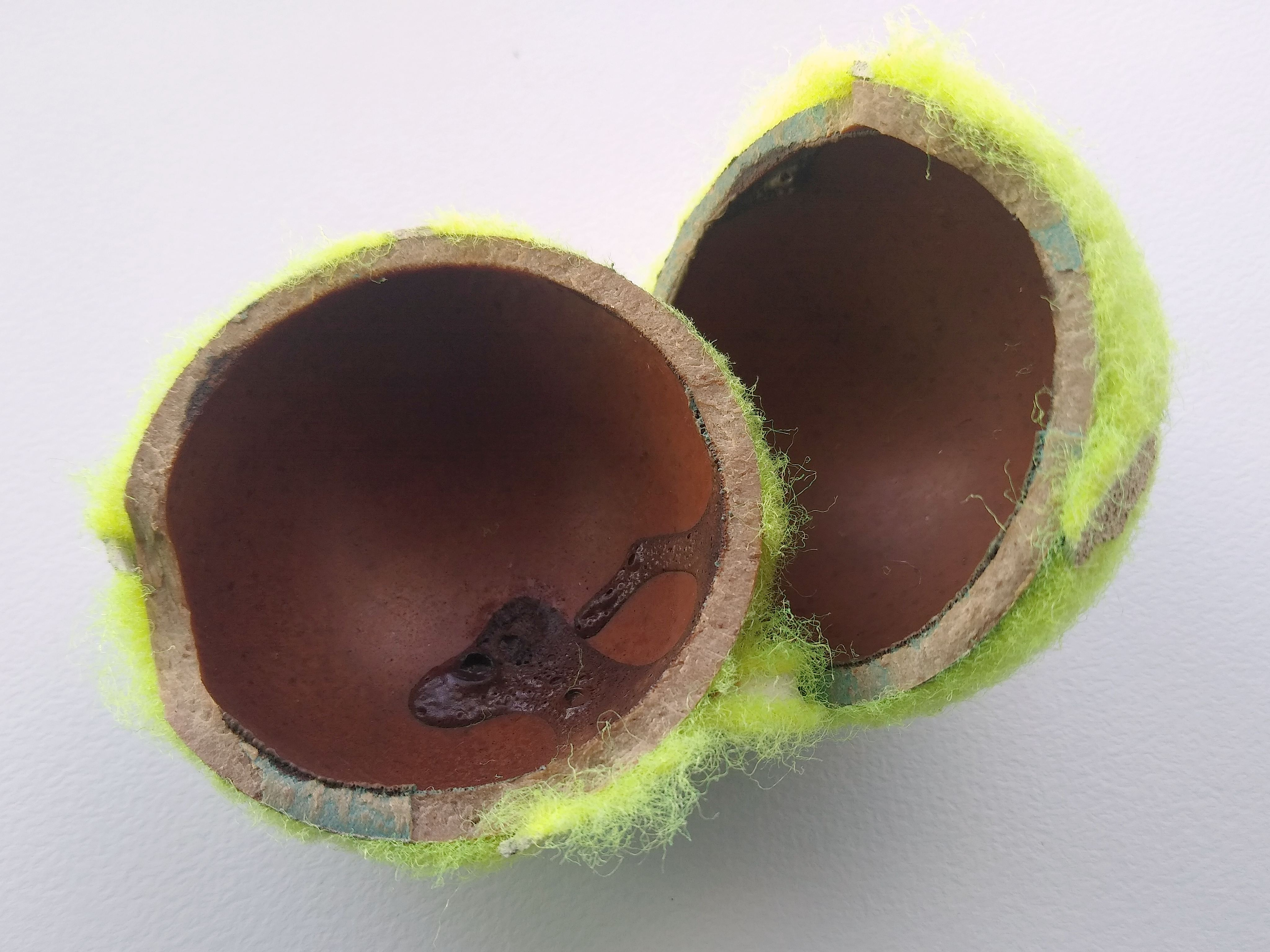
A tennis ball sliced open to show its rubber bladder

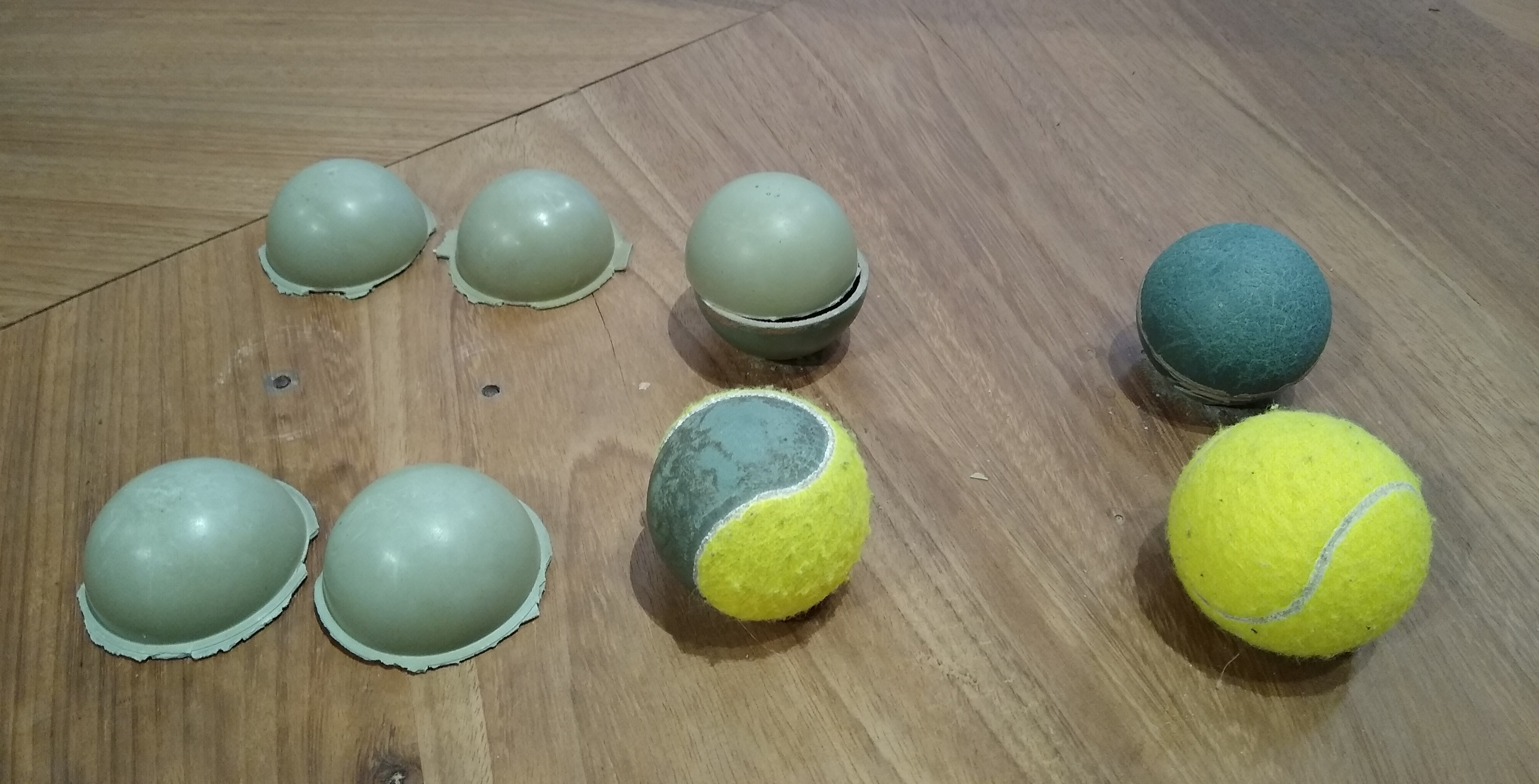
Tennis balls and internal "blanks" manufactured by Dunlop Slazenger

Modern tennis balls must conform to certain size, weight, deformation, and bounce criteria to be approved for regulation play. The International Tennis Federation (ITF) defines the official diameter as 6.54–6.86 cm (2.57–2.70 inches). Balls must have masses in the range 56.0–59.4 g (1.98–2.10 ounces). A tennis ball generally has 12 pounds per square inch (80 kPa; 0.8 atm) more of a nitrogen and oxygen mixture than the sea level ambient air pressure. Yellow and white are the only colors approved by the ITF. Most balls produced are a fluorescent color known as "optic yellow", first introduced in 1972 following research demonstrating they were more visible on television. What color to call the ball is mildly controversial; one poll showed that a little less than half of people consider this color yellow, while a slight majority consider it green.

Tennis balls are filled with air and are surfaced by a uniform felt-covered rubber compound. Tennis ball felts comprise wool, nylon, and cotton in a mixture surrounding the rubber edge. The felt delays flow separation in the boundary layer which reduces aerodynamic drag and gives the ball better flight properties. Often, the balls will have a number in addition to the brand name. This helps distinguish one set of balls from another of the same brand on an adjacent court.

Tennis balls begin to lose their bounce as soon as the tennis ball can is opened. Tennis balls lose bounciness because, once a can is opened, the air inside the ball has nothing pushing back against it compared to when it is packaged under pressure. When packaged, the pressure in the can matches the pressure of the air in the balls, preserving the pressure inside. When a tennis ball is unpackaged, its frequent use allows for air to escape from the ball. They can be tested to determine their bounce. Modern regulation tennis balls are kept under pressure (approximately two atmospheres) until initially used; balls intended for use at high altitudes have a lower initial pressure, and inexpensive practice balls are made without internal pressurization. A ball is tested for bounce by dropping it from a height of 254 cm (100 inches) onto concrete; a bounce between 135 and 147 cm (53 and 58 inches) is acceptable if taking place at sea-level and 20 °C (68 °F) with relative humidity of 60%; high-altitude balls have different characteristics when tested at sea level.

== Slower balls ==
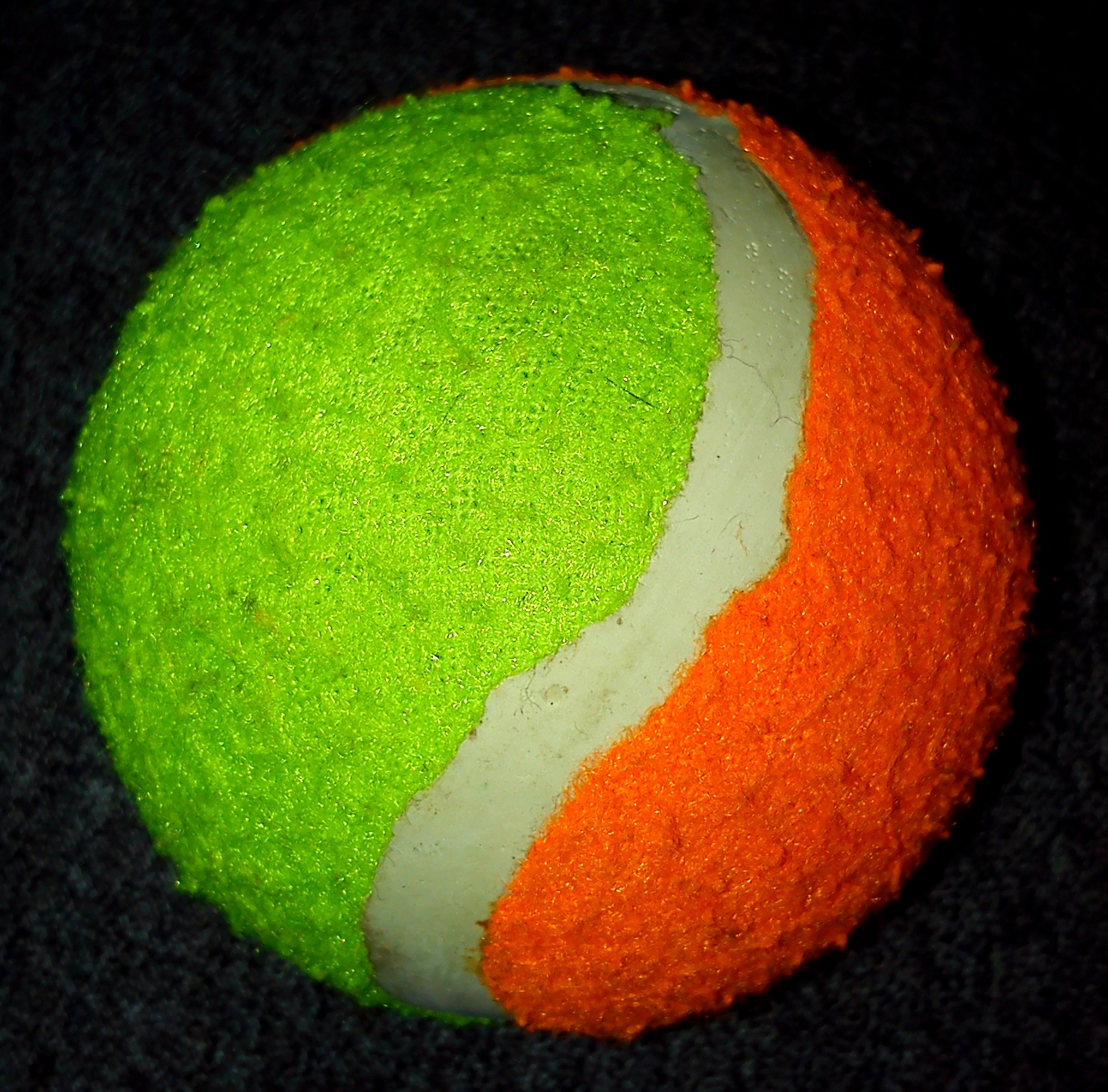
A training tennis ball

The ITF's "Play and Stay" campaign aims to increase tennis participation worldwide by improving how starter players are introduced to the game. The ITF recommends a progression that focuses on a range of slower balls and smaller court sizes to introduce the game to adults and children effectively. The slowest balls, marked with red, or using half-red felt, are oversized and unpressurized or made from foam rubber. The next, in orange, are unpressurized normal-sized balls. The last, with green, are half pressured normal sized.

== History ==
Importation (No. 2) Act 1463
- Act of Parliament
- Parliament of England
- Long title: Certain merchandises not lawful to be brought ready into this realm.
- Citation: 3 Edw. 4. c. 4
- Territorial extent: England and Wales; Ireland

Dates
- Royal assent: 29 April 1463
- Commencement: 29 April 1463 (Note: Start of session.)
- Repealed: 21 May 1816
Other legislation
Repealed by	Importation (No. 4) Act 1816
Relates to	Repeal of Acts Concerning Importation Act 1822; Statute Law Revision Act 1863; Statute Law Revision (Ireland) Act 1872

Status: Repealed

Text of statute as originally enacted

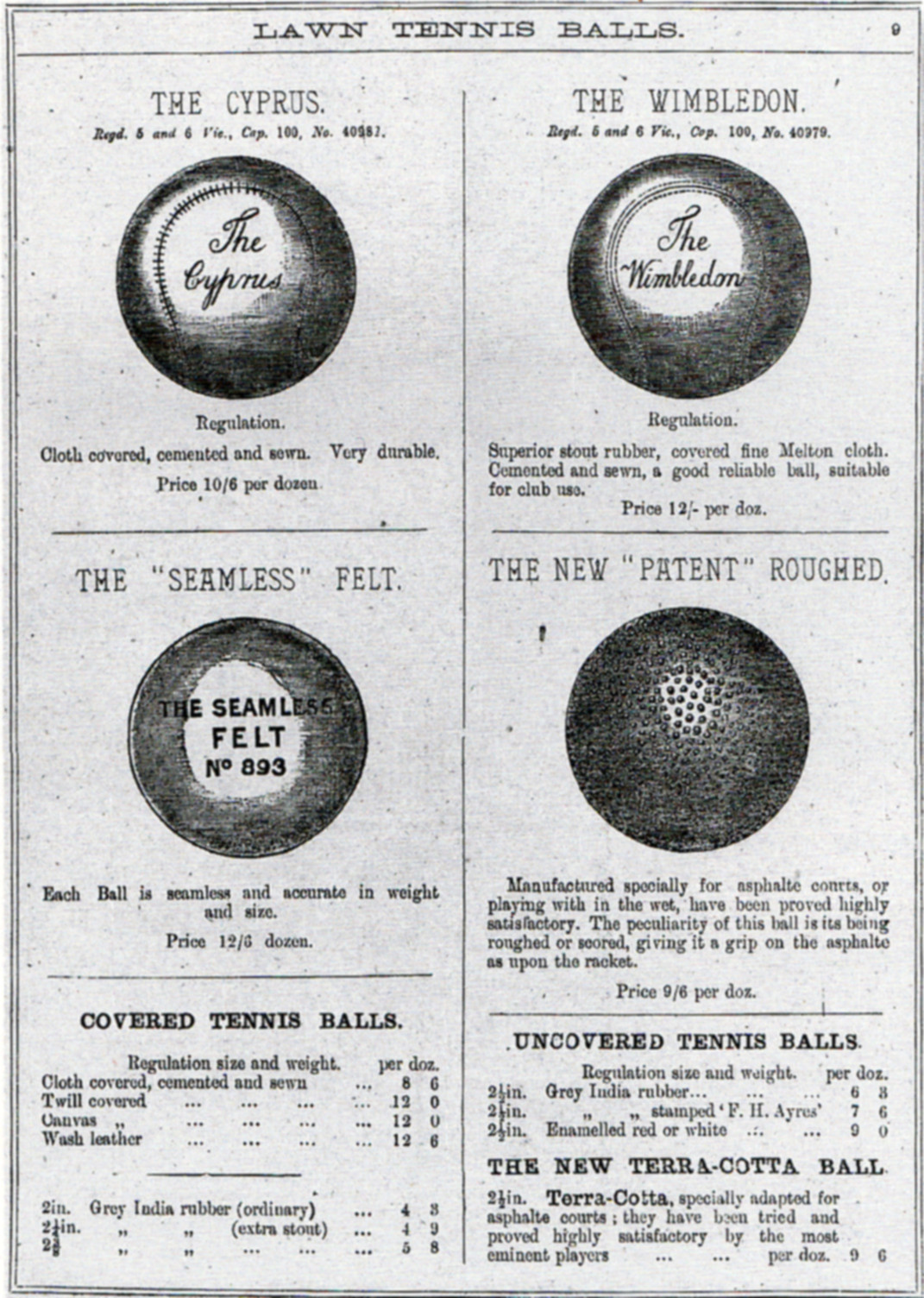
Tennis balls, advertisement, 19th century

Lawn tennis, as the modern game was originally known, was developed in the early 1870s as a new version of the courtly game of real tennis. England banned the importation of real tennis balls, playing cards, dice, and other goods in the Importation (No. 2) Act 1463 (3 Edw. 4. c. 4). In 1480, King Louis XI of France forbade the filling of tennis balls with chalk, sand, sawdust, or earth, and stated that they were to be made of good leather, well-stuffed with wool. Other early tennis balls were made by Scottish craftsmen from a wool-wrapped stomach of a sheep or goat and tied with rope. Those recovered from the hammer-beam roof of Westminster Hall during a period of restoration in the 1920s were found to have been manufactured from a combination of putty and human hair and were dated to the reign of Henry VIII. Other versions, using materials such as animal fur, rope made from animal intestines and muscles, and pine wood, were found in Scottish castles dating back to the 16th century. In the 18th century, 1.9 cm (3/4 in) strips of wool were wound tightly around a nucleus made by rolling several strips into a little ball. String was then tied in many directions around the ball, and a white cloth covering was sewn around the ball.

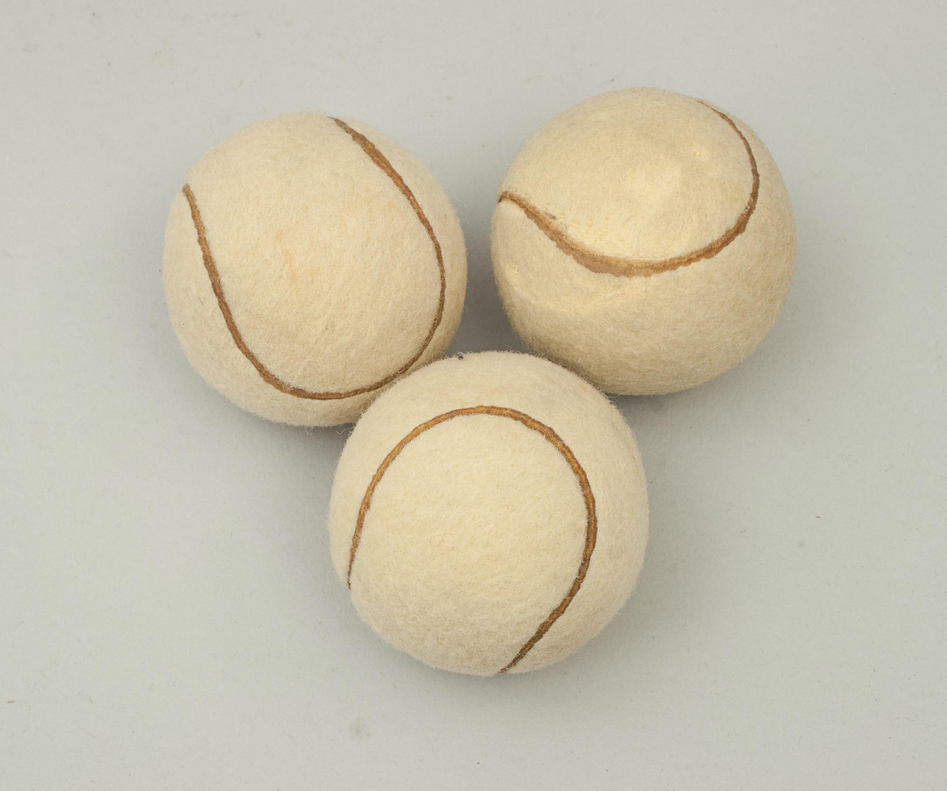
Vintage, original white tennis balls (Slazenger Lawn Tennis Balls)

In the early 1870s, lawn tennis arose in Britain through the pioneering efforts of Walter Clopton Wingfield and Harry Gem, often using Victorian lawns laid out for croquet. Wingfield marketed lawn tennis sets which included rubber balls imported from Germany. After Charles Goodyear invented vulcanised rubber, the Germans had been most successful in developing air-filled vulcanised rubber balls. These were light and coloured grey or red with no covering. John Moyer Heathcote suggested and tried the experiment of covering the rubber ball with flannel, and by 1882, Wingfield was advertising his balls as clad in stout cloth made in Melton Mowbray. Tennis balls were initially entirely made of rubber, but they were later refined by using flannel and stitching it around the core, which used to be filled with rubber. The tennis ball quickly switched to having a hollow core, using gas to pressurize the inside. Originally, tennis ball manufacturing was done by cutting vulcanized rubber sheets into a shape similar to that of a three-leaf clover. Before the formation of the rubber into a sphere (which was executed via machinery), chemicals that reacted to produce a gas were added to produce pressure into the hollow inside once the sphere was assembled. The switch to the modern method of joining two hemispheres was done to improve uniformity of wall thickness.

Until 1972, tennis balls were white (or sometimes black). In 1972, the International Tennis Federation introduced yellow balls, as these were easier to see on television, and these quickly became generally popular. Wimbledon continued using white balls until 1986.

== Packaging ==
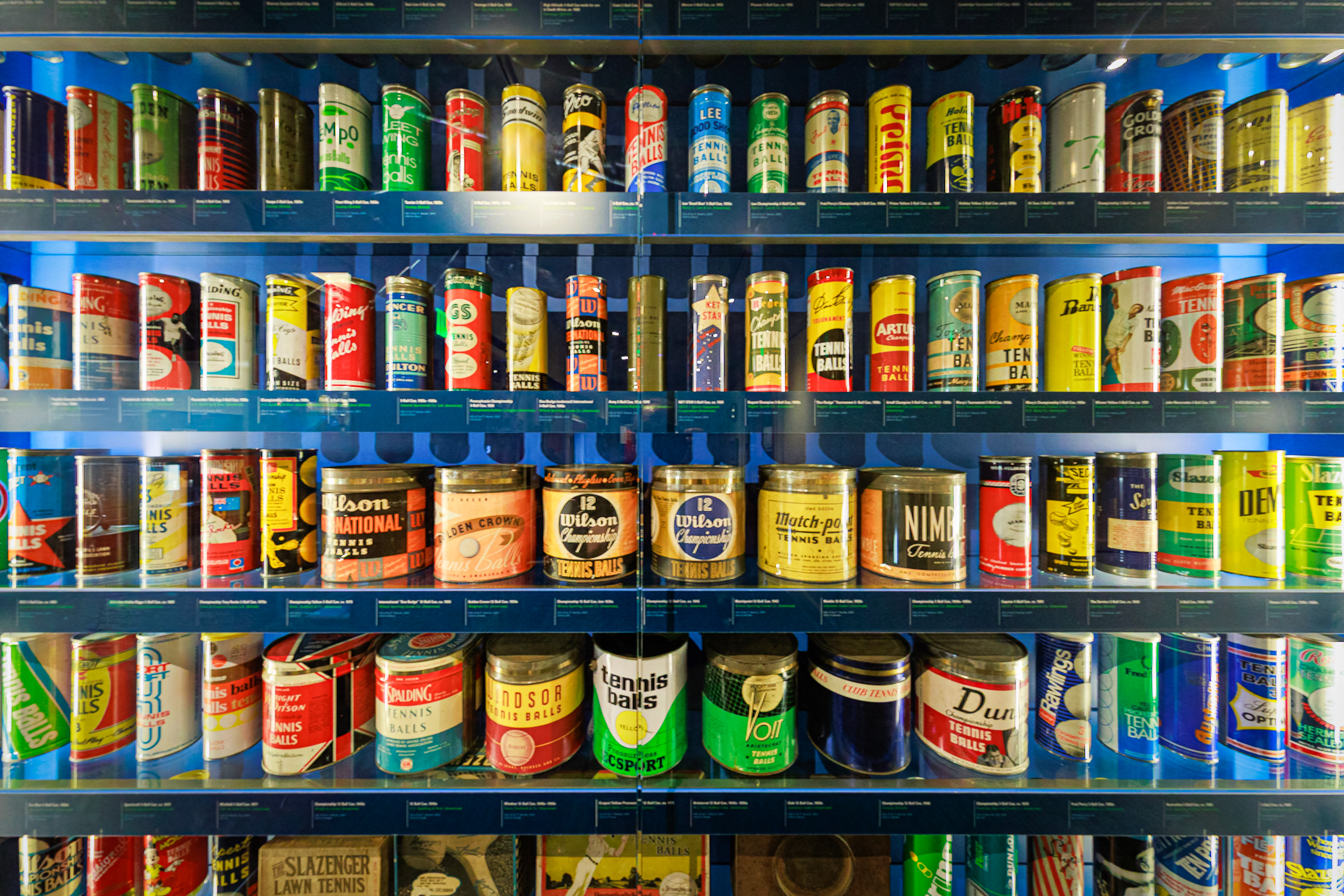
A display of tennis ball cans at the International Tennis Hall of Fame

Before 1925, tennis balls were packaged in wrapped paper and paperboard boxes. In 1925, Wilson-Western Sporting Goods Company introduced cardboard tubes. In 1926, the Pennsylvania Rubber Company released a hermetically sealed pressurized metal tube that held three balls with a churchkey to open the top. Beginning in the 1980s, plastic (from recycled PET) cans with a full-top pull-tab seal and plastic lid fit three or four balls per can. Pressureless balls often come in net bags or buckets since they need not be pressure-sealed.

== Disposal ==
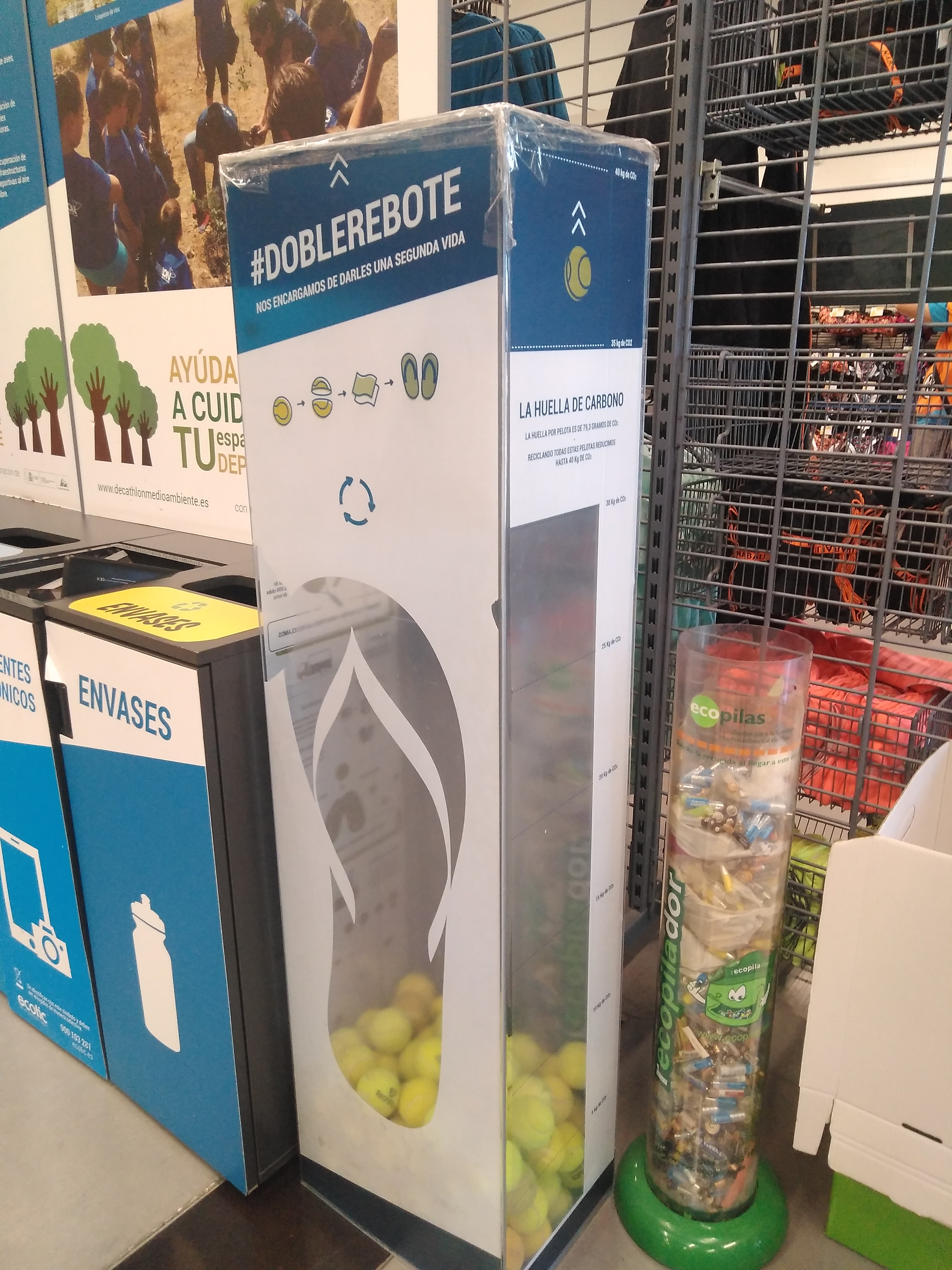
Recycling bin for tennis balls, at a sports equipment store in Spain

Each year approximately 325 million balls are produced, which contributes roughly 20,000 tonnes (22,000 short tons) of waste in the form of rubber that is not easily biodegradable. Historically, tennis ball recycling has not existed. Balls from the Wimbledon Championships are now recycled to provide field homes for the nationally threatened Eurasian harvest mouse.

== In literature ==
The gift of tennis balls offered by the Dauphin's emissary to King Henry in William Shakespeare's Henry V (c. 1599) is portrayed as the final insult which re-ignites the Hundred Years' War between England and France.

John Webster also refers to tennis balls in The Duchess of Malfi.

== Notable manufacturers ==
- Babolat
- Donnay
- Dunlop
- Penn/Head
- Prince
- Slazenger
- Snauwaert
- Tecnifibre
- Völkl
- Wilson
- Yonex
