= List of acts of the Parliament of Ireland, 1400–1499 =

This is a list of acts of the Parliament of Ireland for the years from 1400 to 1499.

The number shown by each act's title is its chapter number. Acts are cited using this number, preceded by the years of the reign during which the relevant parliamentary session was held; thus the act concerning assay passed in 1783 is cited as "23 & 24 Geo. 3 c. 23", meaning the 23rd act passed during the session that started in the 23rd year of the reign of George III and which finished in the 24th year of that reign. Note that the modern convention is to use Arabic numerals in citations (thus "40 Geo. 3" rather than "40 Geo. III"). Acts of the reign of Elizabeth I are formally cited without a regnal numeral in the Republic of Ireland.

Acts passed by the Parliament of Ireland did not have a short title; however, some of these acts have subsequently been given a short title by acts of the Parliament of the United Kingdom, acts of the Parliament of Northern Ireland, or acts of the Oireachtas. This means that some acts have different short titles in the Republic of Ireland and Northern Ireland respectively. Official short titles are indicated by the flags of the respective jurisdictions.

A number of the acts included in this list are still in force in Northern Ireland or the Republic of Ireland. Because these two jurisdictions are entirely separate, the version of an act in force in one may differ from the version in force in the other; similarly, an act may have been repealed in one but not in the other.

A number of acts passed by the Parliament of England also extended to Ireland during this period.

== 3 Hen. 4 (1402) ==
This session was also traditionally cited as 3 H. 4.

- Forcible Entry Act 1402
- Liberties, customs, franchises, etc., of the Holy Church to be enjoyed without interference
- Statute against admirals
- Jurisdiction of admirals

== 11 Hen. 4 (1410) ==
This session was also traditionally cited as 11 H. 4.

- Election of sheriffs: confirmation of rights
- Statute that no mariner convey any labourer out of this land.
- c. 1 Confirming liberties of the Church.
- c. 2 Liberties, etc.
- c. 3 City of Dublin and other cities are to enjoy their franchises.
- c. 4 Kilkenny: confirmation of statutes.
- c. 5 Dissolution or adjournment of parliaments, etc.
- c. 6 Coynye (billeting) and liverey.
- c. 7
- c. 8 Confirming office of clerk of the market.
- c. 9 Certain office holders not to be escheator, clerk of the market, etc.
- c. 10 Defendants to be allowed 3 weeks to take journey to show up and defend.
- c. 11 Inhabitants of Colie in the barony of Dundalk.
- c. 12 Non-compellability of appearance before justice or officer of the peace on certain days.
- c. 13 Procedure to permit absence from Ireland without impeachment, etc.
- c. 14 False offices taken by escheators and remedies available for this, etc.
- c. 15 False Imprisonment Act 1410^{(Republic of Ireland)} None to be arrested without warrant.
- c. 16 Qualifications of escheators, etc.
- c. 17 Escheator to perform office in person, etc.
- c. 18 Possession of lands.
- c. 19 Repeals of patents.
- c. 20 Kings Bench not be removed from the county where it is first appointed without reasonable cause, etc.
- c. 21 Treatment of officers who protect felons.
- c. 22 Restriction on the movement of grain.
- c. 23 Justices of the Peace.
- c. 24 Treatment of those who adhere to enemies.

== 13 Hen. 4 (1411) ==
This session was also traditionally cited as 13 H. 4.

- Writ patent out of England for enrolling and proclaiming the statutes against provisors.

== 9 Hen. 5 (1421) ==
This session was also traditionally cited as 9 H. 5.

- c. 1 Owing to war and disagreements, the King's presence necessary in Ireland.
- c. 2 Revenue of the land to be retained for public purposes.
- c. 3 Money to be coined in Ireland as in England.
- c. 4 Pope's sanction to a crusade against the Irish enemies to be sought.
- c. 5 Complaint as to Sir Laurence Merbury, Chancellor, having refused to affix the Great Seal to a message for the King.
- c. 6 Request for remedy against heavy charges.
- c. 7 Heirs of John de Stanley, late lieutenant, to be compelled to pay his debts, etc.
- c. 8 Mode of government of Thomas, archbishop of Dublin, Justiciar, a good example to be followed.
- c. 9 Sir John Talbot, lieutenant, and his officers, to make amends for extortions, etc.
- c. 10 Commissioners to be appointed, to enquire into the conduct of lieutenants, officers, etc.
- c. 11 Request for aid and support to the present lieutenant, who abolished coynye (billeting), etc.
- c. 12 Extortions through illiterate men performing office in the Exchequer by deputy.
- c. 13 English lieges born in Ireland no longer received in Inns of Court.
- c. 14 Castilian and Scotch enemies hold the sea between England and Ireland: merchants robbed, etc.
- c. 15 Escheators of Ireland not to appoint deputies unless they have sufficient lands, etc.
- c. 16 Pardon of crown debts.
- c. 17 Recital of English Statute 3 Ric. 2 as to absentees.
- c. 18 As to the patronage of the living of Galtrym, dioceses of Meath, etc.
- c. 19 Power to the lieutenant to receive homage and present to the King's benefices.

== 5 Hen. 6 (1427) ==
This session was also traditionally cited as 5 H. 6.

- Priory of Mullingar.

== 7 Hen. 6 (1428) ==
This session was also traditionally cited as 7 H. 6.

- An Act for the Additions of Jurors. — repealed by Juries (Ireland) Act 1833 (3 & 4 Will. 4. c. 91)
- c. 1 Liberties, customs, franchises, etc., of the Holy Church to be enjoyed without interference.
- c. 2 Ireland to have all its customs, liberties, etc.
- c. 3 Dublin, Drogheda, etc., to have their franchises, etc.
- c. 4 Descriptive particulars of parties to be added in inquisitions.
- c. 5 Commons not to be liable for escape of felons in time of war.
- c. 6 Payments to be made for goods, etc., taken by purveyors, etc.
- c. 7 Purveyors to be fined for taking goods, etc.
- c. 8 Indictments and Pleadings Act 1428^{(Republic of Ireland)} Forms of pleading and indictments.
- c. 9 Subsidy on County of Louth in aid of erection of castles.
- c. 10 Payments for victuals, etc., for hostings, to be made.
- c. 11 None to sell cloth except of lawful measure.
- c. 12 Arrest of labourers and servants leaving Ireland.
- c. 13 Merchants bringing skins, etc., out of Ireland to be bound to pay customs at foreign staple.
- c. 13 (Note: Second statute 'c. 13'.) None to sell victuals, etc., to enemies without licence.

== 8 Hen. 6 (1430) ==
This session was also traditionally cited as 8 H. 6.

- c. 1 Liberties, customs, franchises, etc., of the Holy Church to be enjoyed without interference.
- c. 2 Ireland to have its liberties, etc.
- c. 3 Dublin, Limerick, Drogheda, etc., to have their liberties, etc.
- c. 4 Statutes made in Ireland to be kept.
- c. 5 No purveyors, etc., to be allowed in Ireland.
- c. 6 No rebel to hold offices, lands or tenements of the King.
- c. 7 No subsidies save those granted in the King's Great Council.
- c. 8 Statutes against coynye (billeting), livery, etc., to be put in force.
- c. 9 Safeguarders of thieves and rebels adjudged traitors.
- c. 10 Charging the King's subjects with horse or foot, without consent, treason.
- c. 11 No protection to be granted unless party swear that the clause quia profecturus contains truth.
- c. 12 Subsidy on counties Dublin, Meath, Kildare and Louth, in aid of erection of castles.
- c. 13 None to bring creaghts (nomadic cattle), horses, etc., out of march land (border lands) into land of peace called “Maghery” without licence.
- c. 14 Amercement of parties who did not furnish aid towards Sir John Sutton's expedition, as ordered.

== 10 Hen. 6 (1431) ==
This session was also traditionally cited as 10 H. 6.

- Liberties, customs, franchises, etc., of the Holy Church to be enjoyed without interference.
- Ireland to have its customs and liberties.
- Dublin, Drogheda, etc., to have their liberties, etc.
- Commissions for counties Meath, Dublin, Kildare and Louth repealed, as to harassing.
- Labourers in County Louth to be brought in for erection of castles.

== 16 Hen. 6 (1437) ==
This session was also traditionally cited as 16 H. 6.

- Treatment of Foreign Merchants Act 1437^{(Republic of Ireland)} Foreign merchants under protection of the King.

== 18 Hen. 6 (1439) ==
This session was also traditionally cited as 18 H. 6.

- c. 1 An Act against extortion of Purveyors and Harbengers. — repealed by Statute Law Revision (Ireland) Act 1878 (41 & 42 Vict. c. 57)
- c. 2 An Act whereby Comericke is made treason. — repealed by Statute Law Revision (Ireland) Act 1878 (41 & 42 Vict. c. 57)
- c. 3 An Act whereby the cessing of horse of foote upon the Kings subjects, is made treason. — repealed by Criminal Statutes (Ireland) Repeal Act 1828 (9 Geo. 4. c. 53)
- c. 4 An Act that no protection quia profecturus, shalbe sealed before the partie make oath in the Chauncerie that the cause conteyned in the protection is true. — repealed by Statute Law Revision (Ireland) Act 1878 (41 & 42 Vict. c. 57)

== 20 Hen. 6 (1441) ==
This session was also traditionally cited as 20 H. 6.

- A complaint from the Lords and Commons of Ireland, to King Hen. 6 against James Butler Earl of Ormond.

== 25 Hen. 6 (1447) ==
This session was also traditionally cited as 25 H. 6.

- Illegal levying of custom.
- c. 1 An Act that the King's officers may passe by Sea from one part of the Kingdome to another without forfeiture of their offices. — repealed by Statute Law Revision (Ireland) Act 1878 (41 & 42 Vict. c. 57)
- c. 2 An Act that such officers as be absent by the commandement of the King, Deputie or Councell shall not forfeit his office. — repealed by Statute Law Revision (Ireland) Act 1878 (41 & 42 Vict. c. 57)
- c. 3 An Act that no custome shall be taken of Merchants by the high way, but in Cities, Borough townes, and market townes. — repealed by Customs Law Repeal Act 1825 (6 Geo. 4. c. 105)
- c. 4 An Act that English shall not weare their beards after the Irish manner.
- c. 5 An Act that if any Irish enemie have beene received into the Kings allegeance, and after robbe or spoyle, it shall be lawfull to doe with him and his goods as with an enemie.
- c. 6 An Act against clipped money, and against the wearing of gilt bridles and harncis.
- c. 7 An Act that the sonnes of husbandmen shall not be idle, but labour in husbandry. — repealed by Statute Law Revision (Ireland) Act 1878 (41 & 42 Vict. c. 57)
- c. 8 An Act that Lords of Parliaments in plees shall not be amercied otherwise then other persons. — repealed by Statute Law Revision (Ireland) Act 1878 (41 & 42 Vict. c. 57)
- c. 9 An Act concerning Absentees. — repealed by Statute Law Revision (Ireland) Act 1878 (41 & 42 Vict. c. 57)
- c. 10 An Act restrayning the transportation of bullion. — repealed by Customs Law Repeal Act 1825 (6 Geo. 4. c. 105)
- [c. 1] Liberties, customs, franchises, etc., of the Holy Church to be enjoyed without interference.
- [c. 2] Ireland to have its liberties, etc.
- [c. 3] Leave for Sir John Talbot, Chancellor, to appoint a deputy.
- [c. 4] Confirmation of letters patent appointing Robert Plunket Chief Justice at Pleas.
- [c. 5] Confirmation of letters patent appointing Edward Somerton second justice at Pleas.
- [c. 6] Annulling of letters patent appointing Michael Gryffyn Chief Baron of the Exchequer.
- [c. 8] Confirmation of letters patent appointing Hugh Wogan Clerk of the Crown in Chancery.
- [c. 9] Thomas Belyane pretended Dean of Ossory adjudged a traitor and his benefices and dignities forfeited.
- [c. 10] Repeal of statute as to Exchequer and Common Bench being removed out of Dublin.
- c. 11 As to levying arrears of money raised for war, due to William Welles and others.
- c. 12 King's officers in Ireland may purchase lands, etc., there.
- c. 13
- c. 14
- c. 15 Confirmation of statute as to foreign merchants coming to Ireland being under the King's protection.
- c. 16
- c. 17
- c. 18 Citizens of Waterford to resist the rebels and traitors.
- c. 19 Sir John Pilkyngton, deprived of the Escheatry of Ireland under Act of Parliament, through absence.
- c. 20
- c. 21
- c. 22
- c. 23 Dunlavin free of tallages, etc., for 5 years.
- c. 24 Kilmainham, etc., free of tallages, etc., for 5 years.
- c. 25
- c. 26 Proclamation to be made that Thomas Veldon and others, as traitors, appear before the Council.
- c. 27 Proclamation to be made that Gerrot Cruys and others, as traitors, appear before the King’s lieutenant.
- c. 28 Confirmation of letters patent exempting the Abbot of Tintern from attendance on parliament or great councils.
- c. 29
- c. 30 King to be certified of truth as to sorcery being practised in Ireland.
- c. 31 Proclamation to be made that Gerrot Cruys and others appear before the King's lieutenant, to clear themselves of alleged offences.
- c. 32 Mayor, etc., of Drogheda discharged from accounting at Exchequer for customs and tolls.
- c. 33 Session of Duke of York in liberty of Meath, which was not held owing to the seneschal's absence on an expedition in Ulster, to be held later.
- c. 34 Special levy for erecting castles.

== 27 Hen. 6 (1449) ==
This session was also traditionally cited as 27 H. 6.

- c. 1 Liberties, customs, franchises, etc., of the Holy Church to be enjoyed without interference.
- c. 2 Ireland to enjoy its liberties, etc.
- c. 3 Dublin, Waterford and Drogheda, etc., to have their franchises, etc.
- c. 4 No commission out of Chancery to enquire of felonies, etc., in County Dublin, etc., except such as made to the justices of the peace.
- c. 5 Chief serjeant liberty of Meath, to account for issues.
- c. 6 Judges to enter in their own names fines, etc., received by them.
- c. 7 No lord of parliament to be sheriff to the King or to a franchise.
- c. 8 Indictments on treasons, etc., in Dublin and Kildare before commissioners annulled, save in Cahyll Carragh's case.
- c. 9 Lands, etc., held of temporal lords charged with rents, etc., as alms for religious houses and not ancient foundation of the same and tenants of such lands, etc., to be assessed for subsidies and taxes.
- c. 10 Certain justices, barons and officers of the King to enjoy their offices, according to the effect of the letters patent.
- c. 11 Confirmation to Christopher Plunket, Lord of Killeen, of a market at Killeen.
- c. 12 Discharge of 20 marks to Christopher Plunket, penalty for not building a castle at Piercetown in Meath, and letters patent annulled.
- c. 13 Proclamation to be made that the Abbot of Dunbrody, who was seized when coming to parliament, be set at liberty.
- c. 14 John Wykes and others may appoint deputies during absence and their lands, etc., to be under the King’s protection.
- c. 15 Irregular grants of certain offices annulled.
- c. 16 Execution of recognizances against Nicholas Husse, baron of Galtrim, not to be made.
- c. 17 Discharge of 20 marks to William Nugent, penalty for not building a castle at Dardistown in Meath, and letters patent annulled.
- c. 18 William Crose made prior of Foure.
- c. 19 Discharge of sureties for building a castle at Kilpatrick in Meath.
- c. 20 Discharge of John Bombose and sureties for building a castle at Croyneston in Meath and for levy in aid.
- c. 21 Bishop of Leighlin discharged of £20 amercement for not appearing in a great council.
- c. 22 Bishop of Ossory discharged of £20 amercement for not appearing at a great council.
- c. 23 Bishop of Connor and Down discharged of £20 amercement for not appearing at a great council.
- c. 24 John, Bishop of Limerick, pardoned an amercement for £20 for not attending a great council.
- c. 25 The King advised to grant that John Kevernok be Treasurer of Limerick Cathedral.
- c. 26 Rights of the citizens of Limerick to vote at election of mayor and bailiffs.

== 28 Hen. 6 (1449) ==
This session was also traditionally cited as 28 H. 6.

- c. 1 An Act against Coynee, Cuddies, and night suppers.
- c. 2 An Act that upon complaints to the gouvernour of this island, he that complayneth shall fine suertie for the damage of him against whom the complaint is, and the cause to be sent to the proper Court.
- c. 3 An Act that it shall be lawfull to kill theeves found robbing or breaking of houses, or taken with the manner. — repealed by Offences Against the Person (Ireland) Act 1829 (10 Geo. 4. c. 34)
- c. 4 An Act that priviledge shall not be graunted for any servants, but onely for such as are continually attendant.

== 28 Hen. 6 (Dublin) (1449) ==
This session was also traditionally cited as 28 H. 6.

- c. 1 The Holy Church to be free and enjoy her liberties and franchises, etc.
- c. 2 Enjoyment of franchises and liberties in Ireland. — repealed by Statute Law Revision (Ireland) Act 1878 (41 & 42 Vict. c. 57)
- c. 3 The cities of Dublin and Waterford, the town of Drogheda and other cities and towns to enjoy their liberties, franchises and good customs, etc.
- c. 4 — repealed by Statute Law Revision (Ireland) Act 1878 (41 & 42 Vict. c. 57)
- c. 5 Sergeants to answer for the issues by them returned.
- c. 6
- c. 7 Waterford, Cork, etc., to layde corne from Dublin, etc.
- c. 8
- c. 9
- c. 10 Supplication to the King regarding the Earl of Osmond.
- c. 11 The keeping of certain castles.
- c. 12 Ardfynan discharged from customs and sanctions.
- c. 13 Thomastown walled.
- c. 14 Commendations sent to the King on behalf of the Archbishop of Dublin.
- c. 15 Walling of the town of Meath.
- c. 16 Patents for buildings of castles.
- c. 17 Limerick not let their lands to Irish enemies without the assent of the bailiffs, etc.
- c. 18 Levy on Ulster.
- c. 19 Order against Alexander Shelton for exhibiting a false acquitance on his account in the Exchequer.
- c. 20 Levy for the town of Fiddert.
- c. 21 Privilege; discharges the arrest of a citizen of Limerick.
- c. 22 Grant of free liberties to pilgrims coming from and going to the Abbey of Trim.
- c. 23 Annuity for Cardinal of Carthelaghe.
- c. 24 Sessions in the liberty of Meath not to be discontinued.
- c. 25 Lands held by ancestor to be held by Lord Barrey for life.
- c. 26 Lands held by ancestor to be held by Lord Roche for life.
- c. 27 Lands held by ancestor to be held by Lord Coursey for life.
- c. 28 Removal of Oneale (O'Neill) from specific land.
- c. 29 Sir William Wells, knight, escheator of Meath, may appoint a deputy.
- c. 30 Confirmation of statute against provisors, etc.

== 28 Hen. 6. Sess. 2 ==
This session was also traditionally cited as 28 H. 6. Sess. 2, 28 H. 6. Stat. 2, 28 H. 6. St. 2 and , 28 H. 6. st. 2.

- c. 1 An Act that no processe shall be made out of the Exchequer against him that hath a discharge of Record, upon paine of forfeiture of the office of him that maketh the processe.
- c. 2 An Act that in all commissions of Oyer and Terminer the Chauncellor, Treasorer, Justises of the one Bench or of the other, or Barons of the Exchequer, the kings sergeant or Atturney to be one.
- c. 3 An Act for selling wine and Ale and other liquors by sealed measures.

== 28 Hen. 6 (Drogheda) (1450) ==
- c. 1 Liberties, customs, franchises, etc., of the Holy Church to be enjoyed without interference. — repealed by Statute Law Revision (Ireland) Act 1878 (41 & 42 Vict. c. 57)
- c. 2 Ireland to have its liberties, etc.
- c. 3 Dublin, Waterford and Drogheda to have their franchises, etc. — repealed by Statute Law Revision (Ireland) Act 1878 (41 & 42 Vict. c. 57)
- c. 4 Lands, rents, etc., granted by the King, to be resumed into his hands. — repealed by Statute Law Revision (Ireland) Act 1878 (41 & 42 Vict. c. 57)
- c. 5 Royal service to be proclaimed and a levy to be made.
- c. 6 Confirmation of ordinances of great council last held.
- c. 7
- c. 8
- c. 9 Justiciar and other officers may purchase lands, etc., in Ireland, while in office, notwithstanding statutes.
- c. 10 Fynyn O'Driscoll to be treated as an enemy.
- c. 11
- c. 12 No purveyor to take corn, hay, etc., or tithes belonging to the church, without consent.
- c. 13 Richard, Duke of York, to be restored to wardship of 2 parts of lands, etc., in liberties of Meath and Ulster, held by Janico and John Dartas, Liscartan.
- c. 14 Ratoath Markets Act 1450^{(Republic of Ireland)} Richard, Duke of York, to have fairs and markets in Ratoath.
- c. 15 Archbishop of Armagh may purchase lands, advowsons, etc., to the value of 100 marks yearly.
- c. 16 Leave to Archbishop of Armagh, etc., to levy £100 paid for resisting O'Neill and others in Louth.
- c. 17 Abbot of Our Lady, Navan, may purchase lands, advowsons, etc., to the value of £40 yearly.
- c. 18 Commons of Irishtown, Kilkenny, parishoners of vicars of the common hall of St. Canice, discharged of all tallages, assessments, etc.
- c. 19 Licence to James, Earl of Ormond, to go on pilgrimage to Cantebury and other places, and to be absent one year.
- c. 20 William and Nicholas Arture of Limerick to appear and answer for seizing prize wines belonging to James, Earl of Ormond, during his arrest in England.
- c. 21 Leave to Sir Esmond Mulso to make a town, to be called Mulsoescourt in Fercullen, etc.
- c. 22 Licence to Sir Esmond Mulso to appoint a deputy seneschal of the liberty of Meath, during his absence in the King’s wars.
- c. 23 Robert, Bishop of Ferns, by reason of age and infirmity, excused from attendance at parliaments or great councils.
- c. 24 Licence to Sir William Welles to appoint a deputy escheator, liberty of Meath, during his absence in the King's wars.
- c. 25 When mayor and bailiffs of Dublin leave the City on the King's service, they may appoint deputies to hold pleas.
- c. 26 Louth, etc., to be discharged of escapes for homicides by the Irish.
- c. 27 Thomas Bathe, Escheator of Ireland, may appoint a deputy.
- c. 28 Walter Birford arraigned assise of novel disseisin against John Heyne.
- c. 29 Grant of customs to the King as a subsidy, 19 Hen. 6, revoked.
- c. 30 Profits of land devised for repair of Babesbridge over the Boyne to be delivered to the Abbot of Navan and another, to be laid out on repairs.
- c. 31 Statute made in Ireland 8 Hen. 6 as to English cloth sold by English merchants to be amended in accordance with the English statute.
- c. 32 Maurice de la Noe, merchant of Brittany, may come with 60 persons, for victualling in Limerick.
- c. 33 Thomastown, County Kilkenny, free of tallages, etc., for 10 years, for repair of its walls.
- c. 34 Merchants and mariners may come to Cork, Waterford, etc., with corn.
- c. 35 Towns built by Englishmen in Kildare to be free of tallages, etc., for six years.
- c. 36 Letter of thanks to the King for James, Earl of Ormond.
- c. 37 Carrickmagriffin Markets Act 1450^{(Republic of Ireland)} Carrick in Tipperary, burned by rebels.
- c. 38 Proclamation to be made that Walter Bernevale appear to answer Laurence Taaf.
- c. 39 Mayor and bailiffs of Limerick to have power to deliver gaol.

== 32 Hen. 6 (1453-54) ==
This session was also traditionally cited as 32 H. 6.

- c. 1 An Act against provisors. — repealed by Statute Law Revision (Ireland) Act 1878 (41 & 42 Vict. c. 57)
- c. 2 An Act for the discharge of the Coroners enquest when they know not the felon. — repealed by Statute Law Revision (Ireland) Act 1878 (41 & 42 Vict. c. 57)
- c. 3 An Act concerning appeales, in hope to be sent into England. — repealed by Statute Law Revision (Ireland) Act 1878 (41 & 42 Vict. c. 57)
- c. 1 Actions relating to the Earl of Kildare.
- c. 2 Mayor of Dublin, etc., discharged for prosecution of certain rebels.
- c. 3 The sessions of the liberty of Meath to be restrained until another day.
- c. 4 That the court in the liberty of Meath may be held before the Justice of the liberty for a year.
- c. 5 That a writ shall be made for the Master of the Rolls to appear in parliament to be examining certain records of parliament that should be in his custody.
- c. 6 Extending the County of Dublin.
- c. 7 Repeal of a recognizance made by Sir Nicholas Woder, knight.
- c. 8 Prohibition to impose livery or coynye (billeting) on church lands.
- c. 9
- c. 10
- c. 11
- c. 12 Swearing of the peace.
- c. 13 Measures of corn.
- c. 14 Meath, Kildare and Uriell discharged of subsidies.
- c. 15 Declaring the appearance of Bedlowe at Dublin Castle.
- c. 16 Avoiding a lease made by the prior of St. John’s of Jerusalem and Thomas Bathe.
- c. 17 Confirming a lease made to Robert Dowall, Chief Justice.
- c. 18 Granting of licence to John Hall of Bagottesrath.
- c. 19 An order for payment of the second Justice of the King's Bench.
- c. 20 That John Gorge and others may distrain for rents assigned to them for payment of their fees.
- c. 21 A repeal of a grant made of the maner of Gormaniston (Manor of Gormanstown).
- c. 22 To avoid an obligation made by the Baron of Delvin.
- c. 23 To avoid a bond of the staple (market) made by the Baron of Delvin.
- c. 24
- c. 25 Steven Derpatrick and others ordered to appear in the King's bench, or face being adjudged felons, etc.
- c. 26
- c. 27 Trial of a murder done at Greenecastle, in Uriell.
- c. 28 Repeal of an Act ordering the appearance of Michael Griffen in the King's Bench.
- c. 29 Grant of certain land for life to Chancellor of St. Patrick's of Dublin.
- c. 30 Mayor, etc., of Dublin to be discharged of parts of their fee farms (fee simple estate with a rent reserved to the grantor).
- c. 31 Mayor and bailiffs of Dublin to give licences to unload cargo, etc.
- c. 32 James Caddell restored to the possession of Beshelliston against the claim of Richard Beshell.
- c. 33 Granting of leave to Abbot of St. Thomascourte to sue in King's Bench against false verdict in the Court of Exchequer.
- c. 34 A fee for keeping the Castle of Cartheligh.
- c. 35 Everard of Randeliston restored.
- c. 36 Confirmation of patents made to Nicholas Blackton.
- c. 37 A confirmation of the office of Second remembrance.
- c. 38 Avoiding an obligation made by Robert Barnewall and John Prapeston to Sir Thomas Cusake, knight.
- c. 39 John Bennet and action of debt upon the recovery of money against the Prior of St. John's of Jerusalem.
- c. 40 Water of Thamon.
- c. 41 Castle of Tawloughe.
- c. 42 Castle of Ballemore.
- c. 43 Award for building of castle in County Kildare.
- c. 44 Thomas Whyte to be restored to possession of Jokestown.
- c. 45 Confirmation of Thomas Johnson to the office of Chief Sergeant in County of Dublin.
- c. 46 Waterford; water bailiff not to take any custom of any of the commons.
- c. 47 Commission for persons employing labourers to work on trenches and fortresses on the borders of County of Meath.
- c. 48 Commission for persons employing labourers to work on trenches and fortresses on the borders of County of Louth.
- c. 49 Commission for persons employing labourers to work on trenches and fortresses on the borders of County of Kildare.
- c. 50 Commission for persons employing labourers to work on the borders of the County of Dublin.
- c. 51 Writ of error.

== 33 Hen. 6 (1455) ==
This session was also traditionally cited as 34 H. 6.

- c. 1 An Act whereby Commissioners are prohibited to award Exigents. — repealed by Statute Law Revision (Ireland) Act 1878 (41 & 42 Vict. c. 57)
- c. 2 An Act for the fees of the Recorders Clerks of Dublin & Drogheda. — repealed by Statute Law Revision (Ireland) Act 1878 (41 & 42 Vict. c. 57)
- c. 3 An Act that every man shall answer for his sonnes and waged men.
- c. 4 An Act concerning Commissioners and Escheators. — repealed by Statute Law Revision (Ireland) Act 1878 (41 & 42 Vict. c. 57)
- c. 9 Ships guarding the sea between Ireland and England to have certain tolls

== 34 Hen. 6 (1455) ==
This session was also traditionally cited as 34 H. 6.

== 35 Hen. 6 (1456) ==
This session was also traditionally cited as 35 H. 6.

- c. 1 An Act that Merchants strangers shall pay 40. d. custome for every pound of silver that they carry out of this land. — repealed by Customs Law Repeal Act 1825 (6 Geo. 4. c. 105)
- c. 2 An Act that every man shall answer for the offence of his sonnes as the offender should have done, saving punishment of death. — repealed by Criminal Statutes (Ireland) Repeal Act 1828 (9 Geo. 4. c. 53)
- c. 3 An Act that if any person not amesnable to the law, shall enter into any lands without licence of the Gouernour and Counsell, he shall lose his title.

== 36 Hen. 6 (1458) ==
This session was also traditionally cited as 36 H. 6.

- c. 1 An Act that beneficed persons shall keepe residence. — Church of Ireland Act 1824 (5 Geo. 4. c. 91)
- c. 2 An Act concerning the inclosing of townes and villages. — repealed by Statute Law Revision (Ireland) Act 1878 (41 & 42 Vict. c. 57)
- c. 3 An Act that Persons not amenable to the Law shall not enter, distrain, rob, threaten, or kill any Tenants for any Lands, or Tenements, contrary to the Common Law, but shall first show their Title to the Governor and Council, and thereupon have Licence to distrain or enter in peaceable Manner. — repealed by Criminal Statutes (Ireland) Repeal Act 1828 (9 Geo. 4. c. 53)
- c. 4
- c. 5
- c. 6
- c. 7
- c. 8
- c. 9
- c. 10 Kildare Markets Act 1458^{(Republic of Ireland)} Grant of fairs and markets in the town of Kildare to the Earls of Kildare.

== 37 Hen. 6 (1459) ==
This session was also traditionally cited as 37 H. 6.

- c. 1 Warrants and Patents Act 1459 An Act that Warrants made to the Great Seal, shall have the day of their Delivery to the Chancellors, &c. Entered; and that the Patents shall bear the Data of that day. — repealed for the Republic of Ireland by Statute Law Revision (Pre-Union Irish Statutes) Act 1962 (No. 29) and for Northern Ireland by Statute Law (Repeals) Act 1969 (c. 52)

== 38 Hen. 6 (1460) ==
This session was also traditionally cited as 38 H. 6.

- c. 1 An Act that none shall sue actions in the Exchequer, unlesse the plaintife be a minister of the same Court, or servant to some minister of Record there. — repealed by Statute Law Revision (Ireland) Act 1878 (41 & 42 Vict. c. 57)
- c. 14 Foreign enemies spoil and slay merchants, &c., on sea

== 1 Edw. 4 (1461) ==
This session was also traditionally cited as 1 E. 4.

- Remission of part of the fee farm of the City of Dublin.

== 1 Edw. 4 (1462) ==
- c. 1 Liberties, customs, franchises, etc., of the Holy Church to be enjoyed without interference.
- c. 2 Ireland to have its franchises, etc.
- c. 3 Dublin, Waterford and Drogheda to have their customs, etc.
- c. 4 New silver coins to be made.
- c. 5 Taking wheat and corn out of the country.
- c. 6 Sir Thomas Plunket to have 12 trees out of Trim park.
- c. 7 Issues lost in suits by Richard Nugent, baron of Delvin to be null.
- c. 8 Proctors of Kilmallock Church, County Limerick, may receive lands, rents, etc.
- c. 9 William Sutton to have profits of his wardships, until he levy his arrears.
- c. 10 Katherine Petit, widow of Sir John Kerdyf, to have writ of dower.
- c. 11 Thomas Broun, Waterford, to appear to answer writ of error.

== 2 Edw. 4 (1462) ==
This session was also traditionally cited as 2 E. 4.

- c. 1 An Act that certaine money shall be received of the issues and profites of the courts for the repayring of the hall of the Castle. — repealed by Statute Law Revision (Ireland) Act 1878 (41 & 42 Vict. c. 57)
- c. 1 Commons of Dublin, etc., discharged of amercements incurred for not appearing at Knockalyn and Slewyn.
- c. 2 Each to answer for his own offences and those of his family and men.
- c. 3 Gentry to answer for idlemen.
- c. 4
- c. 5 Statutes, grants, etc., in favour of Dublin City confirmed.
- c. 6 New farthings of copper mixed with silver to be coined.
- c. 7 Sheriff of Meath to have £10 for 3 years, compensation for losses.
- c. 8 £40 to Lord Gormanston and Sir Thomas Plunket for building a castle at the ford of Kinnafad.
- c. 9 Grants of customs in Trim, etc., for pavage and murage ratified.
- c. 10 Duke of Somerset and several others adjudged traitors and to forfeit lands, etc.
- c. 11 King's sessions to be held for Meath in Tolsell, Drogheda, on Meath side, and for Louth and Uriell in the Tolsell on that side.
- c. 12 Confirmation of letters patent to Sir William Welles of offices of Chancellor and Chief Butler of Ireland.
- c. 13 Statute 28 Hen. 6 as to castle, etc., of Ballivor made void.
- c. 15 Sir Robert Preston, Lord of Gormanston, as Lord of Kells in Ossory, to sit in Parliament above David Flemyng, Baron of Slane, etc.
- c. 16 Sir Robert Preston, Lord Gormanston, may distrain for yearly rents on manors, etc., granted him by letters patent.
- c. 17 Sir Robert Barnewall, Lord of Trimlestown, may distrain in the manor of Trim.
- c. 18 Ratification, approvement and confirmation of letter patent.

== 3 Edw. 4 (1463) ==
This session was also traditionally cited as 3 E. 4.

- c. 1 An Act whereby the Lords and Commons of Parliament have priviledge 40. dayes before and after the Parliament. — repealed by Statute Law Revision (Ireland) Act 1878 (41 & 42 Vict. c. 57)
- c. 2 An Act concerning the fees of the Attornies and Clerkes of the Kings Courtes. — repealed by Statute Law Revision (Ireland) Act 1878 (41 & 42 Vict. c. 57)
- c. 3 An Act against clipped money. — repealed by Coinage Offences Act 1832 (2 & 3 Will. 4. c. 34)
- c. 1 Liberties, customs, franchises, etc., of the Holy Church to be enjoyed without interference.
- c. 2 Ireland to have its franchises, etc.
- c. 3 Dublin, Waterford and Drogheda to have their customs, franchises, etc.
- c. 4 Confirmation of office of Justice of Ireland to Thomas, Earl of Kildare.
- c. 5 Earl of Desmond, as deputy of Duke of Clarence, may appoint a deputy.
- c. 6 Act of resumption, allowing seizure of lands and profits rightfully belonging to the King.
- c. 7 Endowment of Alice, widow of Lord Slane, void.
- c. 8 Custody of Carlow, Ross, etc., to be committed to Earl of Desmond.
- c. 9 Town of Dungarvan Act 1463^{(Republic of Ireland)} Dungarvan to enjoy liberties, etc., as Clare in England.
- c. 10 Profits of markets in Dungarvan and Rathkeale granted for defence of those towns.
- c. 11 Release of receipt of fee farms of Dungarvan to Earl of Desmond.
- c. 12 John Lofft, etc., pretended burgesses of Mungret, to do Bishop of Limerick suit and service, etc.
- c. 13 Livery of lands to Christopher Bellew.
- c. 14 Subsidy to Richard Bellew for repairing castle of Roche.
- c. 15 Robert and Roger Rocleford to have for 20 years lands in Cookstown, etc.
- c. 16 William Harrold to surrender, to answer for murder and pillage at Balally, Dundrum, County Dublin.
- c. 17 Persons who occupy King's inheritance in Connaught to appear and show title.
- c. 18 Feoffments, leases, etc., by priors Fitzgerot and Talbot, void.
- c. 19 Act against James Ketyng, prior St. John Jerusalem, for assaulting Sir Robert Douedall, annulled.
- c. 20 Inspeximus charter to Hospital of St. John of Jerusalem.
- c. 21 Town of Youghal Act 1463^{(Republic of Ireland)} Confirmation of letters patent, etc., to town of Youghal.
- c. 22 Esmond Roche to surrender, and show title.
- c. 23 Acts against Richard Bermyngham, deceased, annulled.
- c. 24 John Chevir restored to mill of Esker, watercourse, etc.
- c. 25 James de Dokeray to surrender, to answer charges made by him against Earl of Desmond.
- c. 26 William Wyncheton to surrender, to show title to Church of Kilbarrymeaden.
- c. 27 Richard Bossher to surrender, to show title to prebend of Killawgy.
- c. 28 Laurence Taaff to surrender, to show title.
- c. 29 Christopher Wellesley pardoned treasons, etc.
- c. 30 James White and another to surrender for robbing, etc., Thomas Notte and another.
- c. 31 Act of resumption by the taking back of offices by the King.
- c. 32 Confirmation of grant to Germyn Lynche as to coinage of Ireland.
- c. 33 Henry Mann to surrender, to show title to Pevreleston, County Meath.
- c. 34 James Hay to appear, to show title to Lingstown, etc., County Wexford.
- c. 35 Suit against Archbishop of Dublin and Robert Ashe, void.
- c. 36 Proctors of St. Patrick's, Wexford, may receive possessions, etc., for said church.
- c. 37 Confirmation of grant to SS. Peter and Paul, Wexford.
- c. 38 Archbishop of Dublin discharged of royal service, out of Coilacht, it being waste.
- c. 39 Coins to be struck at Dondory, Waterford.
- c. 40 Hugh Rocheford and others to appear before Mayor of Waterford, to answer to John Wadeyn.
- c. 41 Steps to be taken by Baron of Delvin for defence of the Barony.
- c. 42 Nicholas Nugent to account with Baron of Delvin for sums received on lands mortgaged.
- c. 43 Baron of Delvin to have royal service from Coladoghran, Ballymony, Cloghran.
- c. 44 People of Cork, Limerick, Waterford and Youghal, may barter with the Irish.
- c. 45 Elice, widow of Richard Bourk, of Caherconlish, to have her dower out of his lands.
- c. 46 Wexford town fund called “common share” to be expended on walling.
- c. 47
- c. 48 Confirmation of grants, etc., to Limerick.
- c. 49 Mayor, etc., of Limerick, to hear and determine action by William Comyn, of that City, against persons who disseised him of lands in the County.
- c. 50 Grant towards building the castle of Kilmahuke, County Kildare.
- c. 51 Lord Portlester to have the manor of Portlester.
- c. 52 Grant towards building a castle at Coole, County Wexford.
- c. 53 Dower of Margaret, wife of Patrick Corger, out of premises in Limerick City.
- c. 54 Christopher Plunket to have livery of lands in County Meath.
- c. 55 Bishop of Lismore and Waterford may purchase lands, etc.
- c. 56 Parson of St. Laurence, Dunmoe, Meath, to have Prestesrath, to support a chaplain in St. Katherine's chapel.
- c. 57
- c. 58 Letters to be sent to the King as to the services of the Earl of Desmond.
- c. 59 Distresses not to be taken in Donore, etc.
- c. 60 Abbey of St. Thomas, Dublin, to have church of St. Columba, of Confey.
- c. 61 Barnaby Chamberleyn, and others, to answer for murder of John Halton, etc.
- c. 62 Confirmation of grant of office of Chancellor of Ireland to Earl of Kildare.
- c. 63 Confirmation of grant of office of Lieutenant of Ireland to Duke of Clarence.
- c. 64 John Fitz Richard and others to answer to Alice Talbot, as to Glaspistol, etc.
- c. 65 Confirmation of grant of office as collectors of custom to Walter Delahide and others.
- c. 66 Confirmation of grant of office of Chancellor of Green Wax, etc., to Walter Delahyde and another.
- c. 67 100 marks to be levied for Lord Gormanston and others, in which they were bound.
- c. 68 Letters to be sent to the King as to the services of the Earl of Desmond.
- c. 69 Confirmation of grant of office of Chief Chamberlain, Exchequer, to Nicholas Strangways.
- c. 70 Prior of Errew in Connaught may receive grants in alms, rents, etc.
- c. 71 Repeal of earlier Act compelling Martyn Barnewall to present himself before the Constable of the Castle of Leixlip.
- c. 72 Repeal of earlier Act compelling Richard Fitz Richer to appear before the King's Chief Place (Court of Common Pleas).
- c. 73 Thomas Bermyngham restored to serjeanty of Meath.
- c. 74 Baldongan manor to be assessed in subsidies at half a ploughland.
- c. 75 Dean and Chapter of Kildare to appear in Parliament by a proctor.
- c. 76 Thomas Yong and others to enter on Stephenstown and other lands, County Meath.
- c. 77 Fercolyn, County Dublin, to belong to City of Dublin.
- c. 78
- c. 79 Rathescar, County Louth, assessed as a single ploughland.
- c. 80 Baron of Skreen to show title to Rathconnell manor.
- c. 81 Archbishop of Dublin restored to services out of Galmoreston, etc.
- c. 82 Repair of Babesbridge, County Meath.
- c. 83 Esmond Hay and others to satisfy John Clone for robbery.
- c. 84 Writ of dower for Elizabeth, wife of John Eustace, out of manor of Castleknock.
- c. 85 Indictment against John Eustace annulled.
- c. 86 Robbery of James White.
- c. 87 Richard Harrold to show title to Newtown, etc., County Dublin.
- c. 88 Philip Synnot and others to answer John Wadeyn.
- c. 89 Bill against Johannet Casse annulled.
- c. 90 Martin Bernevale to show title to Briggesend.
- c. 91 Confirmation of Act releasing Thorncastle, County Dublin, of rent.
- c. 92 Dower of wife of Thomas Sueterby.
- c. 93 Robert Castell to have yearly pension.
- c. 94 John Vale discharged of accounts in Exchequer.
- c. 95 James Brewer to have £10 from Manor, etc., of Waterford.
- c. 96 Robert St. Laurence, as heir of the Lord of Howth, to have livery of lands, etc.
- c. 97 Confirmation of grant of £20 yearly to Holy Trinity, Dublin.
- c. 98 As to debts due to Robert Yong, London.
- c. 99 Founding of a chantry in Dunboyne Church.
- c. 100 Chaplains of the new College of St. Mary, Youghal, may acquire lands, etc.
- c. 101 House of Friars Preachers, Naas, to have a water mill and water near Naas and Yagoestown.
- c. 102 Patent of pardon and release to the Sovereign portreeves, etc., of Ross.
- c. 103 Sheriff of County Cork to make levy, for payment of Knights of the Shire.
- c. 104 Drawing stones for building a tower at Kilmainham bridge.
- c. 105 Act of resumption by the taking back of certain offices by the King.

== 3 Edw. 4. Sess. 2 (1463) ==
This session was also traditionally cited as 3 E. 4.

- c. 1
- c. 2
- c. 3
- c. 4
- c. 5 Thomas Hay and others to answer for felonies, etc.
- c. 6 Deputy of the Lieutenant may appoint a deputy.
- c. 7
- c. 8
- c. 9
- c. 10 Regulations as to prises of wines to be taken by Sir William Welles, Chief Butler of Ireland.

== 5 Edw. 4 (1465) ==
This session was also traditionally cited as 5 E. 4.

- c. 1 An Act concerning challenges for kindred, or alliance between the Sheriffe and cestuy que vie. — repealed by Statute Law Revision (Ireland) Act 1878 (41 & 42 Vict. c. 57)
- c. 2 An Act that it shall be lawful to kill such as are found robbing, and to have head money for the same.
- c. 3 An Act that the Irish in the Counties of Dublin, Methe, Vriell and Kildare shall take English names, and use English apparell. — repealed by Statute Law Revision (Ireland) Act 1878 (41 & 42 Vict. c. 57)
- c. 4 An Act for the having of Bowes and arrowes. — repealed by Statute Law Revision (Ireland) Act 1878 (41 & 42 Vict. c. 57)
- c. 5 An Act for the chusing of a Constable in everie towne, and for Butts and Shooting. — repealed by Statute Law Revision (Ireland) Act 1878 (41 & 42 Vict. c. 57)
- c. 6 An Act that forreine ships shal not fish in the Irish countries without licence, and what custome every vessell shall pay.
- City of Cork Act 1465^{(Republic of Ireland)} Pardon of fee farm and grant of custom and cocket of the City of Cork to the mayor and commons there.
- c. 1 Liberties, customs, franchises, etc., of the Holy Church to be enjoyed without interference.
- c. 2 Ireland to have its liberties, etc.
- c. 3 Dublin, Waterford and Drogheda, etc., to enjoy their customs, etc.
- c. 4 Confirmation of grant of £30 yearly for a term, to John Bennet and others, to be expended on the walls, fosses and gates of Dublin
- c. 5 Patrick Cogle, Clerk of the Crown, to have 10 marks yearly
- c. 6 William Archer, sovereign, and other inhabitants of Kilkenny, pardoned their treasons, etc.
- c. 7 Judgments, attainders, etc., against Thomas Abbay annulled.
- c. 8 Judgments, attainders, etc., against John Clerne annulled.
- c. 9 Repeal of earlier Act for appearance of John Milton of Duleek.
- c. 10
- c. 11 John Drake and others of the County Meath to surrender themselves in Dublin.
- c. 12
- c. 13
- c. 14
- c. 15
- c. 16
- c. 17
- c. 18
- c. 19 Germyn Lynche, goldsmith, to coin money in Dublin, Trim, Waterford and Galway.
- c. 20 Confirmation of patent to Thomas, Earl of Desmond, of manors of Trim, etc., for his life.
- c. 21 Grant to Thomas, Earl of Desmond, confirmed.
- c. 22 Confirmation of deed from Esmond Botiller to Thomas, Earl of Kildare.
- c. 23 Confirmation of patent to Gerald fitz Gerrot.
- c. 24 Pardon of all treasons, etc., to Esmond Botiller, son of the Lord of Dunboyne.
- c. 25 Dr. John Fitz Rery may sue City of Dublin for an annuity of 8 marks.
- c. 26 Establishment of Friars Preachers of Kilkenny to be free from secular exaction.
- c. 27 William Saint Laurence to be restored to the office of Admiral of Ireland.
- c. 28 Sir Rowland FitzEustace and John, Lord Wenlock, to have custody of the manors of Newcastle Lyons and Saggart.
- c. 29 Confirmation of patent to Thomas Newbury of 10 marks yearly out of the Manor of Esker.
- c. 30 Confirmation of patent to Thomas Newbery of 10 marks yearly out of the Manor of Newcastle Lyons.
- c. 31 John Bennet to have £3 16 shillings and 8 pence for 60 years on condition of his continuing to erect a tower at Baltire.
- c. 32 Piers Cruys discharged of part of his chief rent out of Crumlin on account of his losses through being taken by the O'Brynnes.
- c. 33 Fraternity of brethren and sisters to be known as that of St. Nicholas the Bishop, of Dunsany.
- c. 34 Privy seals of the Duke of York for homage allowed.
- c. 35 Licence for James, Earl of Ormond, and others to found a Guild of Shoe-makers of Dublin, to be called the Guild of the Blessed Virgin Mary: also to found a chantry at St. Michael's Church, High Street, Dublin.
- c. 36 Establishment of company of men at arms for County Meath.
- c. 37 Michael, Archbishop of Dublin, accused of having assaulted Stephen FitzWilliam at Jobstown.
- c. 38
- c. 39
- c. 40 John, Archbishop of Armagh, indebted to Lombards of Medici Bank, London, to pay £551 6 shillings and 6 pence to James Welles.
- c. 41 Silver bullion coming to mints in Ireland to pay as before.
- c. 42 Confirmation of grant of £4 10 shillings yearly to Robert Rochefort.
- c. 43 Confirmation of Grant to Walron Wellesley of manors of Blackcastle and Donaghmore, County Meath.
- c. 44 Outlawry against John Bulle, Abbot of Navan, not to prejudice John, Archbishop of Armagh, formerly Abbot there.
- c. 45 John, Archbishop of Armagh, may appoint deputy in his office as Warden of the Peace for Uriell and Louth.
- c. 46 University of Drogheda.
- c. 47 £10 worth of silver to be levied and paid to Esmund Wellesley, Baron of Norragh, County Kildare, towards erecting a castle there.
- c. 48 Sheriff of County Meath to have £10 yearly, owing to expenses of the office.
- c. 49 Patent to be made granting Richard, Bishop of Kildare, leave of absence out of Ireland for three years.
- c. 50 Confirmation of grant to Friars Preachers of Dublin of 10 marks out of the fee farm of the City.
- c. 51 Confirmation of leave of absence out of Ireland for 4 years to John Alleyn, prebendary of Howth.
- c. 52 John Barnewall of Drimnagh and Eleanor his wife, to have 7 marks yearly.
- c. 53 Inquisition finding John Kevernok, Vicar of Lusk, an Irishman, annulled.
- c. 54 Margaret, Prioress of Lismullin, seised of Premises in Dunsink and Kellytown.
- c. 55 Laurence Nettervile of Duleek to surrender at Dublin Castle.
- c. 56 Confirmation of grant to Roger Rochford of the office of Chief Engrosser in the Exchequer.
- c. 57 Christopher Berford to enter into land at Oldtown Corbally, in the Barony of Navan, recently held by James, Earl of Ormond.
- c. 58 Patrick Flatisbery seised of Osberstown, Johnstown and Palmerstown, County Kildare.
- c. 59 Leave for Thomas Sherlok of Kilkenny to make an attorney in the Court of Common Pleas.
- c. 60 John Rooth, John Fowlyng and others who disturb John Fowlyng of Drogheda in his possessions in Kilkenny to appear in the Chief Place (Court of Common Pleas), to show title.
- c. 61 King's hands to be removed from premises in Fethard, County Tipperary.
- c. 62 Roger Penkeston of County Kildare to have £10 towards erecting a tower at Ballynagappagh.
- c. 63 Richard Taaff of County Louth to have £10 towards erecting a tower at Cookstown.
- c. 64 Pardon of trespasses, etc., to Henry Walshe of Carrickmines, and others.
- c. 65 Act commanding Robert Taillour of Swords to appear, annulled.
- c. 66 Attainders, etc., against James and Christopher Bellewe annulled.
- c. 67 Act commanding John Nugent to surrender himself made void.
- c. 68 Act commanding John Fleming to surrender himself made void.
- c. 69 Act commanding William Balfe to surrender himself made void.
- c. 70 Act commanding James Fleming to surrender himself made void.
- c. 71 Act attaining Walter Cruys of high treason made void.
- c. 72 James Pursell to submit to legal decision on title of William Saint John.
- c. 73 William and Elizabeth Davy restored to lands from which they had been ousted under an inquisition.
- c. 74 King’s hands removed from certain lands and James Fay to occupy them.
- c. 75 Confirmation of grant of office of controllers of customs and coket in Dublin and Drogheda to Gerrot Fitzgerrot and Thomas Walshe.
- c. 76 William Nugent discharged of surrendering himself at Dublin Castle.
- c. 77 Act requiring Robert Cusake, Nicholas Husse and Patrick Husse to surrender themselves at Dublin Castle, repealed.

== 7 Edw. 4 (1467) ==
This session was also traditionally cited as 7 E. 4.

- c. 1 An Act that the Govenour for the time being may pass into Islands. — repealed by Statute Law Revision (Ireland) Act 1878 (41 & 42 Vict. c. 57)
- c. 2 An Act that none shall purchase Benefices from Rome. — repealed for the Republic of Ireland by Statute Law Revision (Pre-Union Irish Statutes) Act 1962 (No. 29) and for Northern Ireland by the Statute Law Revision Act 1950 (14 Geo. 6.c. 6)
- c. 3 An Act whereby Letters Patents of Pardon from the King, to those that Sue to Rome for certain Benefices, is void.
- c. 4 An Act for the removing of the Exchequer and Common-Pleas.

== 7 & 8 Edw. 4 (1467) ==
This session was also traditionally cited as 7 & 8 E. 4.

- c. 1 Liberties, customs, franchises, etc., of the Holy Church to be enjoyed without interference. — repealed by Statute Law Revision (Ireland) Act 1878 (41 & 42 Vict. c. 57)
- c. 2 Ireland to have its liberties, etc. — repealed by Statute Law Revision Act 1950 (14 Geo. 6. c. 6)
- c. 3 Dublin, Waterford, Drogheda, etc., to have their franchises. — repealed by Statute Law Revision (Ireland) Act 1878 (41 & 42 Vict. c. 57)
- c. 4 Audit of accounts of levy on County Meath. — repealed by Statute Law Revision (Ireland) Act 1878 (41 & 42 Vict. c. 57)
- c. 5 Act 5 Edw. 4 c. 38 (Note: 5 Edw. 4. c. 38 (I)) as to English cloth, annulled.
- c. 6 “Black rent” hitherto paid to the King's enemies, to be paid to the King's lieutenant.
- c. 7 Coins deficient in weight to be taken, but deficiency to be supplied in current money.
- c. 8 Church to command subjects to be obedient to the King.
- c. 9 Money to be coined.
- c. 10 Hubbert Fitz Nicholas and others to surrender.
- c. 11 Indictments against Robert, Lord of Howth, and several of his servants and tenants annulled.
- c. 12 Recovery of presentation of vicarage of Skreen by John, Abbot of St. Mary's, Dublin, confirmed.
- c. 13 Licence to John, Earl of Worchester, and others, to found a chantry at the altar of St. Katherine in church of St. Secundinus, Dunshaughlin.
- c. 14 Execution to be made on William Lynton, prior of Holy Trinity, Dublin, at suit of William Dudley.
- c. 15 Archbishop of Dublin, as Lord of Dalkey, to appoint water bailiff there.
- c. 16 Attainders against William Herbrik void.
- c. 17 Earls of Desmond and Kildare and Edward Plunket attained of treason.
- c. 18a John, Earl of Worchester, to have Lambay Island.
- c. 18b John, Earl of Worchester, to have Seneschal, County Meath.
- c. 19
- c. 20 Lieutenant to have power to charge and discharge the Lords and Commons.
- c. 21
- c. 22
- c. 23
- c. 24 None to take any tanned hides out of the land.
- c. 25 Unions, etc., of the certain prebends and appropriations to precentorship, treasurership and archdeaconry of Glendalough in St. Patrick's, Dublin, etc.
- c. 26 Patent for Barnaby Barnewall to be 2nd Justice of Pleas confirmed.
- c. 27 Patent for John Alleyn, Dean of St. Patrick's.
- c. 28 Acts, attainders, etc., against James Butler, annulled.
- c. 29 Christopher, son of John Douedall, knight, to appear.
- c. 30 William Sutton to have 20 marks yearly during life.
- c. 31 Patrick Cogle to be Clerk of the Crown in Chancery.
- c. 32 John Darcy, Platin, to have a certiorari to certify King's right to certain manors.
- c. 33 Fethard, County Tipperary, to have customs for walling and paving the town.
- c. 34 John Plunket and others to surrender to answer Henry Dowedall.
- c. 35 William Grampey to pay £15 and costs to Matthew Philipp.
- c. 36 Esmund Fitz Richer pardoned all treasons, felonies, etc.
- c. 37 Pardon of Elizabeth Fleming, wife to Christopher Cruys.
- c. 38 Outlawries against Robert Taylor of Swords reversed.
- c. 39 £300 granted to Cross of Wexford for making towers of defence on Taghmon river, etc.
- c. 40 Inquisition against Joan Cristofore quashed; she to enter on premises in Walshstown.
- c. 41 Inquisition against Walter Proute and wife quashed; they to enter on premises in Garristown.
- c. 42 Attainders, etc., against John Drake of Rahood, annulled.
- c. 43 Attainders, etc., against Barnaby Chamberleyn annulled.
- c. 44 Attainders, etc., against John Weston annulled.
- c. 45 James Gernon, sheriff of Uriell, to appear and answer to Walter Verdon.
- c. 46 Thomas and Oliver Fannyng to surrender, to show right to certain lordships, etc., County Tipperary.
- c. 47 Obligation of Sir William Welles annulled.
- c. 48 Act of resumption of certain property into the King's hands, etc.
- c. 49 Roland Fitz-Eustace, Lord of Portlester, acquitted of accusation of treason.
- c. 50 Deputy lieutenant may authorise the Chancellor to adjourn, prorogue, etc., Parliament.
- c. 51 A liberty to be in Ulster with all ancillary powers, officers and jurisdiction.
- c. 52 Pardon of Robert Bold and others for passing clipped money.
- c. 53 Manor of Dardistown freed from charges.
- c. 54 Indictments, etc., under an Act regulating English cloth, annulled.
- c. 55 Robert Rocheford and John Nugent to appear, to show title.
- c. 56 Robert Fitz-Eustace, constable, to keep a sufficient guard in Ballymore Castle.
- c. 57 Pardon of Thomas, Earl of Kildare.
- c. 58 Mayor of Drogheda Act 1467^{(Republic of Ireland)} Patent for mayor, etc., of Drogheda.
- c. 59 Patent for Robert Bold to absent himself from Ireland for eight years.
- c. 60 Patent for Maurice Burghill to absent himself from Ireland for eight years.
- c. 61 John Alleyn, Dean of St. Patrick's, to have revenues of the deanery.
- c. 62 John Rothe and others to surrender, to answer John Fowlyng, as to title to certain premises.
- c. 63 Geffrey Delamare attained of treason.
- c. 64 Borough of Drogheda Act 1467^{(Republic of Ireland)} Patents to Drogheda confirmed.
- c. 65 Assessment of County Kildare for walling of Naas.
- c. 66 Assessment on County Kildare for building a castle at Kilcullen Bridge.
- c. 67 Assessment for reward of £40 to Nicholas Broun.
- c. 68 Ten marks granted to Friars Preachers, Drogheda.
- c. 69 Garret of Desmond attainted of treason.
- c. 70
- c. 71 Patent for Sir John Cornewalshe, Chief Baron, to receive yearly £23 6 shillings and 8 pence, confirmed.
- c. 72 Patent making Robert Bold Baron of Ratoath, confirmed.
- c. 73 Statute made in England against former Queen Margaret, James, former Earl of Wiltshire and others, confirmed.
- c. 74 oining the ford of Agane to build a castle for defence.
- c. 75 Sir Robert Dowdall to appear, to answer for erasing a record.
- c. 76
- c. 77 Sir Thomas Plunket and John Chevir to be Justices for Pleas.
- c. 78 Legacies to St. David’s Church, Kilsallaghan, to be in force.
- c. 79 Mayor, etc., of Drogheda pardoned all offences, etc.
- c. 80 William, Bishop of Emly, and others to appear, to answer Nicholas, prior of St. Mary’s, Kells, County Kilkenny, as to provision for holding said Priory in commendam.
- c. 81 Chapter acts of St. Patrick’s, Dublin, for extension of divine service and hospitality to be in force, as if made at foundation.
- c. 82 Union of the vicarage of Ardbraccan.
- c. 83 Carmelites of St. Mary’s, Drogheda, to have 10 shillings chief rent.
- c. 84 Town of Kells to charge certain customs for fortifying thereof.

== 8 Edw. 4 (1469) ==
This session was also traditionally cited as 8 E. 4.

- c. 1 An Act against Rape.
- c. 2 An Act against ingrossers and regrators of corne. — repealed by Statute Law Revision (Ireland) Act 1878 (41 & 42 Vict. c. 57)
- Confirmation of remissions and pardons previously made to Ismay Barnewall, now wife of Robert Bold.

== 8 & 9 Edw. 4 (1469-70) ==
This session was also traditionally cited as 8 & 9 E. 4.

- Confirmation of grants of land made by Kings Hen. 2 and John to St. Mary's Abbey, Dublin.

== 8-10 Edw. 4 (1469-70) ==
- St. Mary's Abbey, Dublin, discharged from payment of rents in County Dublin.
- Pardon to Barnaby Barnewall of all debts and accounts.

== 10 Edw. 4 (1470) ==
This session was also traditionally cited as 10 E. 4.

- c. 1 Liberties, customs, franchises, etc., of the Holy Church to be enjoyed without interference.
- c. 2 Ireland to have her liberties, etc.
- c. 3 Dublin, Waterford, Drogheda, etc., to have their franchises.
- c. 4 Regulations as to the coinage.
- c. 5 Coins being reduced in value by one half.
- c. 6 Acts, etc., against Thomas, Earl of Kildare, repealed.
- c. 7 On decease of Thomas, Earl of Kildare, King's hands to be removed from his lands, etc.
- c. 8 Those who have property of John, Earl of Worchester, to deliver up same.
- c. 9 Tenants of Saggart to surrender their truce with O'Toole.
- c. 10 Herring Fishery Act 1470 Protection for herring fishery at Dublin.
- c. 11 Taxes in aid of Galweston, Kildare.
- c. 12 Collection of subsidies in Harrold's country (discharging the collectors of subsidies in the barony of Newcastle).
- c. 13 Thomas Flemyng to have livery of manors, etc.
- c. 14 Esmond Plunket to have livery of manors, etc.
- c. 15 No charters of exemption for office of sheriff, County Dublin.
- c. 16 Sheriff of County Meath to have 20 marks for expenses.
- c. 17 Rents, etc., out of Newcastle Lyons granted to Guild of St. Mary, Mulhuddart.
- c. 18 Certain services released to St. Wolstan's, County Kildare.
- c. 19 Abbot of Duleek may repair the weir on the Boyne at the Grange.
- c. 20 Gifts, leases, etc., made by Tintern Abbey since Thomas Yong was Abbot to be, void.
- c. 21 Dame Margaret, late wife of William Butler, to have dower out of the manors of Dunboyne and Moymet.
- c. 23 Confirmation of patent to Patrick Cogley to occupy certain lands for his natural life.
- c. 24 Pardon of treasons, etc., to John fitz-Gerrot.
- c. 25 Pardoning of Nicholas Plunket for any unlawful behaviour and to restore him to possession of certain lands and tenements.
- c. 26 Seisin of lands, etc., of John Heywood void.
- c. 27 Repeal of Act compelling Thomas Hammond to appear before justices.
- c. 28 Archbishop of Dublin restored to his right in Lambay Island.
- c. 29 Levy for building a tower at Readstown, County Meath.
- c. 30 Levy for building a tower at Bellewstown, County Meath.
- c. 31 Sir Robert Bold released of all accounts in respect of Culmullin Manor.
- c. 32 Confirmation of patent (regarding rents to be paid to named individuals) to Robert Rocheford.
- c. 33 Cess for land of Propress of Lismullen.

== 11 & 12 Edw. 4 (1471) ==
This session was also traditionally cited as 11 & 12 E. 4.

- c. 80 Parliamentary Privilege Act 1471^{(Republic of Ireland)} Freedom from arrest of Lords coming to Parliament and their servants; servant of the Prior of the Hospital to be released.

== 12 Edw. 4 (1472) ==
This session was also traditionally cited as 12 E. 4.

- Staple Wares (Scotland) Act 1472 c. 1 An Act prohibiting Staple wares to be carried into Scotland without paying custome. — repealed by Statute Law Revision (Ireland) Act 1878 (41 & 42 Vict. c. 57)
- Bows Importation Act 1472 c. 2 An Act for bringing of Bowes by Merchants into this kingdome. — repealed by 10 Chas. 1. Sess. 3. c. 22 (I), confirmed by Repeal of Acts Concerning Importation Act 1822 (3 Geo. 4. c. 41)
- Corn Exportation Restriction Act 1472 c. 3 An Act to restraine the transportation of corne. — repealed by Statute Law Revision (Ireland) Act 1878 (41 & 42 Vict. c. 57)

== 14 Edw. 4 (1474) ==
This session was also traditionally cited as 14 E. 4.

- c. 5 St. Patrick's Cathedral Act 1474^{(Republic of Ireland)} Confirmation to St. Patrick's.

== 15 Edw. 4 (1475) ==
This session was also traditionally cited as 15 E. 4.

- c. 1 An Act prohibiting the taking of distresses contrary to the common law. — repealed by Criminal Statutes (Ireland) Repeal Act 1828 (9 Geo. 4. c. 53)

== 15 & 16 Edw. 4 (1475) ==
This session was also traditionally cited as 15 & 16 E. 4.

- c. 8 Taking of Pledges Act 1475^{(Republic of Ireland)} Taking of pledges contrary to the common law to be felony.

== 16 & 17 Edw. 4 (1476) ==
This session was also traditionally cited as 16 & 17 E. 4.

- c. 17 County of Louth Act 1476
- c. 22 Courts Act 1476^{(Republic of Ireland)} Lords to wear their robes in Parliament, judges and barons to wear their habits and coifs in term time.

== 18 Edw. 4 (1478) ==
This session was also traditionally cited as 18 E. 4.

- Distress for Rent Act 1478 c. 1 An Act whereby distresses for rent may be solde. — repealed by Landlord and Tenant Law Amendment (Ireland) Act 1860 (23 & 24 Vict. c. 154)
- c. 2 An Act concerning the choosing of Knights and Burgesses of Parliament. — repealed by Statute Law Revision (Ireland) Act 1878 (41 & 42 Vict. c. 57)
- Confirmation of rights: pestilence
- Saint Werburgh's Church Act 1478^{(Republic of Ireland)} Licence for grant of property in City of Dublin to the proctors of St. Werburgh's Church, Dublin.

== 18 Edw. 4 Sess. 1 (1478) ==
This session was also traditionally cited as 18 E. 4. Sess. 1.

- c. 8 Bog of Allen Act 1478^{(Republic of Ireland)} Freedom of drawing turf from the Bog of Allen, etc.

== 20 Edw. 4 (1480) ==
This session was also traditionally cited as 20 E. 4.

- c. 1 An Act to restraine the carrying of Hawkes out of this Kingdome. — repealed by Statute Law Revision (Ireland) Act 1878 (41 & 42 Vict. c. 57)

== 21 Edw. 4 (1481) ==
This session was also traditionally cited as 21 E. 4.

- Christ Church Lands Act 1481^{(Republic of Ireland)} Priory of Holy Trinity Dublin to have licence to retain and accept lands, etc.

== 21 & 22 Edw. 4 (1481) ==
This session was also traditionally cited as 21 & 22 E. 4.

- Christ Church Grants Act 1481^{(Republic of Ireland)} Confirmation of all grants made to Holy Trinity, Dublin.
- Town of Ardee Act 1481

== 1 & 2 Hen. 7 (1486) ==
This session was also traditionally cited as 1 & 2 H. 7.

- c. 1 Grant of reduction of subsidy to John Jordan and John Walsh.
- c. 3 Robert Lauleys and others spoiled at Wirral.
- c. 4 City of Dublin Act 1486 Inclusion of Little Cabragh within the franchises of Dublin.
- c. 5 Borough of Drogheda Act 1486^{(Republic of Ireland)} Inclusion of Barnatty within the franchises of Drogheda.
- c. 6 Confirmation of the appointment of Henry White to the office of Chief Remembrancer of the Exchequer.
- c. 7 Robert Taaf of Marshalrath and Nicholas Taaff of Ballybragan, Sheriff of Louth.

== 8 Hen. 7 (1492) ==
This session was also traditionally cited as 8 H. 7.

- [c. 1] (Annulment of all indictments and judgements against Walter, Archbishop of Dublin)
- (Protection of pilgrims visiting Christchurch Cathedral)
- Dublin Watercourse Act 1492 c. 1 [c. 6] An Act for the clensing of the water-course in S. Patricks streete. — repealed by Statute Law Revision (Ireland) Act 1878 (41 & 42 Vict. c. 57)
- c. 2 (Licence for Irishmen to be presented to benefices)
- c. 3 (Indictments against the mayor, bailiffs and commons of Waterford City to be void)
- c. 4 (Restoration of Maurice Wise to the lands of Islandikane and Ballydermody, County Waterford)
- c. 5 (Confirmation of the liberties of the Church and provision against those contravening them)
- c. 6
- c. 7 (Parish of Ballyboghil, County Dublin, to supply only one horse cart when necessary for expeditions of war)
- c. 8 (Pardon to the abbot of St. Mary's, Dublin, of all treasons and other offences)
- c. 9 (Ballydowd, in the parish of Esker, County Dublin, to be discharged from payment of rent)
- c. 10 (John Wyse, Chief Baron of the Exchequer, to be appointed special justice in counties Kilkenny and Waterford)
- c. 11 (Resumption of grants made by James, Earl of Ormond, and John, Earl of Ormond)
- c. 12 (Edward of Bermingham and his heirs to have the office of chief serjeant of County Meath)
- c. 13 (Deputy Lieutenant empowered to make provisos until the dissolution of the present Parliament)
- c. 14 (William Porter and John Beker to pay rents to Clement Fitz Lenes of Dublin)
- c. 15 (John and Margaret Fitz John to appear to show title to Osberstown and other lands in County Kildare)
- c. 16 (Repeal of all Acts against Christopher Barnewall)
- c. 17 (Repeal of Act against Christopher Barnewall)
- c. 18 (Elizabeth Barnewall, widow of Nicholas Hussey, baron of Galtrim, to have her dower)
- c. 19 (Simon Petit to appear to show title to Mullingar and the Irishtown there, at the request of Edmond Botiller, baron of Dunboyne)
- c. 20 (Act of resumption (seizing of all lands and entitlements rightfully belonging to the King))
- c. 21 (George Nettervill and others to surrender to answer for treasons, robberies and other offences)
- c. 22 (Annulment of Acts against Thomas and William Botiller)
- c. 23 (Licence of absence for John fitz Lenes, prebendary of Swords, studying at Oxford)
- c. 24 (Licence of absence for Richard Eustace, prebendary of Swords, studying at Oxford)
- c. 25 (Sir James Ormond to have waste lands in counties Kilkenny and Tipperary unless the heirs come to inhabit them)
- c. 26 (Dean of St. Patrick's, Dublin, his successors and tenants to be exempt from payment of taxes)
- c. 27 (Sir Roland fitz Eustace, former treasurer of Ireland, to appear and account for his term of office)
- c. 28 (Edmond Vale and others to appear to answer for the attack on Simon Murghell)
- c. 29 (Patrick Dillon to enter into possession of half of the lands of Staffordstown and Gillstown, County Meath)
- c. 30 (Manor of Moymurdry, County Meath, discharged from payment of coynye (billeting) and livery and other charges)
- c. 31 (Balscadden and other lands in County Dublin to be assessed as two ploughlands)
- c. 32 (Holmpatrick priory to receive new custom on fishing vessels called poundage to enable it to complete a harbour near Skerries)

== 9 Hen. 7 (1493) ==
This session was also traditionally cited as 9 H. 7.

- Distress etc. Act 1493 or Distress Act 1493^{(Republic of Ireland)} Distress.

== 10 Hen. 7 (1495) ==
This session was also traditionally cited as 10 H. 7.

- Treasurer's Officers Act (Ireland) 1495 c. 1 An Act Authorizing the Treasurer to make all Officers of the Treasurer of England doth.
- c. 2 An Act that the Chauncellor, Treasorer, Judges, Master of the Rolls, and officers accomptant, shall have their offices but at the Kings will. — repealed by Statute Law Revision (Ireland) Act 1878 (41 & 42 Vict. c. 57)
- c. 3 An Act adnulling a prescription claymed by traytors and rebells. — repealed by Statute Law Revision (Ireland) Act 1878 (41 & 42 Vict. c. 57)
- c. 4 Poynings' Law (on certification of acts) An Act that no Parliament be holden in this Land until the Acts be certified into England. — repealed by Statute Law Revision (Ireland) Act 1878 (41 & 42 Vict. c. 57)
- c. 5 An Act against Provisors to Rome. — repealed by Statute Law Revision (Ireland) Act 1878 (41 & 42 Vict. c. 57)
- c. 6 An Act that no citizen receive livery or wages of Lord or Gentleman. — repealed by Statute Law Revision (Ireland) Act 1878 (41 & 42 Vict. c. 57)
- c. 7 An Act that no man be admitted Alderman or freeman in no towne but where hee hath beene apprentice, or is inhabiting in the same. — repealed by Statute Law Revision (Ireland) Act 1878 (41 & 42 Vict. c. 57)
- c. 8 An Act for the confirmation of the Statutes of Kilkenny. — repealed by Statute Law Revision (Ireland) Act 1878 (41 & 42 Vict. c. 57)
- c. 9 An Act that the subjects of this Realme shall have Bowes and other armour. — repealed by Statute Law Revision (Ireland) Act 1878 (41 & 42 Vict. c. 57)
- c. 10 An Act that the Captaines of the Marches shall certifie the names of such as are in their retinue. — repealed by Statute Law Revision (Ireland) Act 1878 (41 & 42 Vict. c. 57)
- c. 11 An Act that no person shal take amends for the murder of his friend, other than the law will. — repealed by Statute Law Revision (Ireland) Act 1878 (41 & 42 Vict. c. 57)
- c. 12 An Act that no great ordnance be in any fortresse but by licence of the Deputie. — repealed by Statute Law Revision (Ireland) Act 1878 (41 & 42 Vict. c. 57)
- c. 13 An Act that no person stirre any of the Irishry to make warre.
- c. 14 An Act that none shall be Constable of the Castle of Dublin, and other castles, but such as are borne in England.
- c. 15 An Act touching the keeping of the records of the Earledomes of Connaught, Trym, and Ulster. — repealed by Statute Law Revision (Ireland) Act 1878 (41 & 42 Vict. c. 57)
- c. 16 An Act that the Lords of Parliament shall weare robes. — repealed by Statute Law Revision (Ireland) Act 1878 (41 & 42 Vict. c. 57)
- c. 17 An Act that no peace or warre shall be made without licence of the governour. — repealed by Criminal Statutes (Ireland) Repeal Act 1828 (9 Geo. 4. c. 53)
- c. 18 An Act against coyne and livery. — repealed by Statute Law Revision (Ireland) Act 1878 (41 & 42 Vict. c. 57)
- c. 19 An Act declaring what souldiers shall pay for their meat and drinke in time of hostilitie. — repealed by Statute Law Revision (Ireland) Act 1878 (41 & 42 Vict. c. 57)
- c. 20 An Act abolishing the words Cromabo and Butlerabo. — repealed by Statute Law Revision (Ireland) Act 1878 (41 & 42 Vict. c. 57)
- Murder Act (Ireland) 1495 c. 21 An Act whereby murder of malice pretensed is made treason.
- c. 22 Poynings' Act 1495^{(Republic of Ireland)} or Poynings' Law 1495^{(United Kingdom)} An Act confirming all the Statutes made in England. (still in force in the UK)
- Gormandstown Parliament Repeal Act 1495 c. 23 An Act Repealing a Parliament holden at Drogheda before Robert Preston Lord of Gormandstown. — repealed by Statute Law Revision (Ireland) Act 1878 (41 & 42 Vict. c. 57)
- c. 11 St. Patrick's Cathedral Act 1494^{(Republic of Ireland)} Lay Vicars of St. Patrick's not to be touched by the Act of resumption (seizure of lands rightfully belonging to the King).

== 14 Hen. 7 (1498) ==
This session was also traditionally cited as 14 H. 7.

- c. 1 An Act for punishing of Customers &c. for their misdemeanours. — repealed by Statute Law Revision (Ireland) Act 1878 (41 & 42 Vict. c. 57)
- c. 2 (Lords to ride in a saddle in the English manner or face fine)
- c. 3 (Compels lords to wear robes in parliament as in England)
- c. 4 (Poundage)
- c. 5 (Subsidy, tax on land(
- c. 6 (Restoration of the Earl of Kildare)
- c. 7 (Exception of Thomas, Earl of Ormond, from the Act of resumption)

== 15 Hen. 7 (1499) ==
This session was also traditionally cited as 15 H. 7.

- c. 1 An Act of pondage of 12.d in the pound of all merchandise, wine and oyle excepted. — repealed by Statute Law Revision (Ireland) Act 1878 (41 & 42 Vict. c. 57)
- c. 2
- c. 3
- c. 4
- c. 5
- c. 6
- c. 7
- c. 8 (Confirmation of the Statute of Henry fitz Empress)
- c. 9 (Re-enactment of the Statute relating to absentees)

== See also ==
- List of acts of the Parliament of Ireland
- List of acts of the Oireachtas
- List of legislation in the United Kingdom
