= Escheat (Procedure) Act 1887 =

Act of the Parliament of the United Kingdom

Escheat (Procedure) Act 1887 (Note: Section 1.)
- Act of Parliament
- Parliament of the United Kingdom
- Long title: An Act for repealing certain Enactments relating to Escheators and the Procedure in cases of Escheat; and for regulating the Procedure in such cases.
- Citation: 50 & 51 Vict. c. 53
- Territorial extent: United Kingdom

Dates
- Royal assent: 16 September 1887
- Commencement: 16 September 1887 (Note: The Acts of Parliament (Commencement) Act 1793.)
- Repealed: 16 November 1989
Other legislation
Amends	See § Repealed enactments
Repeals/revokes	See § Repealed enactments
Amended by	Statute Law Revision Act 1908; Crown Estate Act 1961; Statute Law (Repeals) Act 1986
Repealed by	Statute Law (Repeals) Act 1989
Relates to	Sheriffs Act 1887; Coroners Act 1887

Status: Repealed

Text of statute as originally enacted

The Escheat (Procedure) Act 1887 (50 & 51 Vict. c. 53) was an act of the Parliament of the United Kingdom that repealed enactments relating to escheators and the procedure in cases of escheat, and regulated the procedure in such cases.

== Provisions ==
=== Repealed enactments ===
Section 3 of the act repealed 11 enactments, listed in the schedule to the act.

Citation	Short title	Description	Extent of repeal
29 Edw. 1	Statutum de Escaetoribus	A statute for escheators.	The whole act.
14 Edw. 3. Stat. 1. c. 8	Escheators and coroners	Escheators: their number; appointment; continuance in office; Coroners: their sufficiency.	In part: namely, except so far as relates to Coroners. (Note: The whole act was repealed by section 45 of, and the third schedule to, the Coroners Act 1887 (50 & 51 Vict. c. 71).)
25 Edw. 3. Stat. 5. c. 2	Treason Act 1351	Declaration what offences shall be adjudged treason, &c.	In part, namely: from "and if in such case" to end of chapter.
36 Edw. 3. c. 13	Escheaters	Escheators shall have no fee of lands in wards, nor commit waste. Fine, and treble damages to the heir injured. Extended to lands seised by inquest of office. Such inquisitions may be traversed in Chancery. The land may be demised to the tenant until judgment. Escheators shall take inquests as directed by the statute 36 Edw. 3. c. 13 on penalty of fine and imprisonment. Escheators shall take no inquests but by persons returned by the sheriffs in their proper counties; on penalty of forty pounds.	The whole act.
8 Hen. 6. c. 16	Inquests by Escheators, etc. Act 1429	No lands seised into the King's hands upon inquests shall be let to farm until after inquests returned; if the party aggrieved traverse the inquests, within a month, the lands shall be let to farm to him, as under 36 Ed. 3. c. 13. All letters patent to the contrary void. Escheators shall return offices found before them within a month.	The whole act.
18 Hen. 6. c. 6	Crown Grants Act 1439	Recital of the statute 8 Hen. 6. c. 16 as to grant of lands by the King after office found. No grant of lands shall be made by the King, until office found and returned, if the King's title be not of record; nor within the month after such return, unless to the traverser.	The whole act.
18 Hen. 6. c. 7	Penalty on Escheators	Escheators not duly returning offices shall pay damages to the King, &c. above the penalty under Statute 8 Hen. 6. c. 16. Treasurer shall be associate with the Chancellor, &c.	The whole act.
23 Hen. 6. c. 16	Escheators	When and where escheators shall take inquests: Fees of escheators. Penalty. On traverse of inquest no protection in scire facias. Leases to traversers.	The whole act.
1 Hen. 8. c. 8	Escheators Act 1509	An Act against Escheators and Commissioners for making false returns of Office and Commissions.	The whole act.
1 Hen. 8. c. 10	Letting of Seized Lands Act 1509	An Act that no Lease shall be made of Land seized into the King's hands, but in certain cases.	The whole act.
2 & 3 Edw. 6. c. 8	Inquisitions of Escheator Act 1548	An Act touching the finding of Offices before the Escheator.	The whole act.

== Subsequent developments ==
The whole act was repealed by section 1(1) of, and group 5 of part I of schedule 1 to, the Statute Law (Repeals) Act 1989, which came into force on 16 November 1989.
