= List of acts of the Parliament of England from 1509 =

This is a list of acts of the Parliament of England for the year 1509.

For acts passed during the period 1707–1800, see the list of acts of the Parliament of Great Britain. See also the list of acts of the Parliament of Scotland, and the list of acts of the Parliament of Ireland.

For acts passed from 1801 onwards, see the list of acts of the Parliament of the United Kingdom. For acts of the devolved parliaments and assemblies in the United Kingdom, see the list of acts of the Scottish Parliament, the list of acts of the Northern Ireland Assembly, and the list of acts and measures of Senedd Cymru; see also the list of acts of the Parliament of Northern Ireland.

For medieval statutes, etc. that are not considered to be acts of Parliament, see the list of English statutes.

See also the List of ordinances and acts of the Parliament of England, 1642–1660 for ordinances and acts passed by the Long Parliament and other bodies without royal assent, and which were not considered to be valid legislation following the Restoration in 1660.

The number shown after each act's title is its chapter number. Acts are cited using this number, preceded by the years of the reign during which the relevant parliamentary session was held; thus the Union with Ireland Act 1800 is cited as "39 & 40 Geo. 3. c. 67", meaning the 67th act passed during the session that started in the 39th year of the reign of George III and which finished in the 40th year of that reign. The modern convention is to use Arabic numerals in citations (thus "41 Geo. 3" rather than "41 Geo. III"). Acts of the last session of the Parliament of Great Britain and the first session of the Parliament of the United Kingdom are both cited as "41 Geo. 3".

Acts passed by the Parliament of England did not have a short title; however, some of these acts have subsequently been given a short title by acts of the Parliament of the United Kingdom, such as the Short Titles Act 1896 (59 & 60 Vict. c. 14).

Acts passed by the Parliament of England were deemed to have come into effect on the first day of the session in which they were passed. Because of this, the years given in the list below may in fact be the year before a particular act was passed.

== 1 Hen. 8 ==
The 1st Parliament of King Henry VIII, which met from 21 January 1510 until 23 February 1510.

This session was also traditionally cited as 1 H. 8.

Note that cc. 16–20 were traditionally cited as private acts cc. 1–5.

Short title	Citation	Royal assent
Long title
Repeal of the Trade with Denmark Act 1429 Act 1509 (repealed)	1 Hen. 8. c. 1	23 February 1510
An Act for repealing of a Statute for fishing in Island. (Note: Trade with Denmark Act 1429 (8 Hen. 6. c. 2)) (Repealed by Statute Law Revision Act 1863 (26 & 27 Vict. c. 125))
Woollen Cloth Act 1509 (repealed)	1 Hen. 8. c. 2	23 February 1510
An Act concerning the making of Woollen Cloth. (Repealed by Statute Law Revision Act 1863 (26 & 27 Vict. c. 125))
Receivers General Act 1509 (repealed)	1 Hen. 8. c. 3	23 February 1510
An Act concerning Receivers. (Repealed by Statute Law Revision Act 1863 (26 & 27 Vict. c. 125))
Penal Statutes Act 1509 (repealed)	1 Hen. 8. c. 4	23 February 1510
An Act that Informations upon Penal Statutes mall be made within Three Years. (Repealed by Statute Law Revision Act 1863 (26 & 27 Vict. c. 125))
Customs Act 1509 (repealed)	1 Hen. 8. c. 5	23 February 1510
An Act for the true Payment of the King's Customs. (Repealed by Repeal of Acts Concerning Importation Act 1822 (3 Geo. 4. c. 41))
Justices of the Peace Act 1509 (repealed)	1 Hen. 8. c. 6	23 February 1510
An Act for repealing of a Statute concerning Justices of Peace. (Note: Offences against Statutes Act 1495 (11 Hen. 7. c. 3)) (Repealed by Statute Law Revision Act 1863 (26 & 27 Vict. c. 125))
Coroners Act 1509 (repealed)	1 Hen. 8. c. 7	23 February 1510
An Act concerning Coroners. (Repealed by Coroners Act 1887 (50 & 51 Vict. c. 71))
Escheators Act 1509 or the Act of Escheators 1509 (repealed)	1 Hen. 8. c. 8	23 February 1510
An Act against Escheators and Commissioners, for making false Returns of Offices and Commissions. (Repealed by Escheat (Procedure) Act 1887 (50 & 51 Vict. c. 53))
Staines Bridge Tolls Act 1509 (repealed)	1 Hen. 8. c. 9	23 February 1510
An Act for the taking of Toll at Staynes Bridge, for the repairing thereof. (Repealed by Staines Bridge Act 1791 (31 Geo. 3. c. 84))
Letting of Seized Lands Act 1509 (repealed)	1 Hen. 8. c. 10	23 February 1510
An Act that no Lease shall be made of Lands seised into the King's Hands but in certain Cases. (Repealed by Escheat (Procedure) Act 1887 (50 & 51 Vict. c. 53))
Perjury Act 1509 (repealed)	1 Hen. 8. c. 11	23 February 1510
An Act against Perjury. (Repealed by Statute Law Revision Act 1863 (26 & 27 Vict. c. 125))
Traverse of Certain Inquisitions Act 1509 (repealed)	1 Hen. 8. c. 12	23 February 1510
An Act for Admittance of a Traverse against an untrue Inquisition. (Repealed by Statute Law Revision Act 1863 (26 & 27 Vict. c. 125))
Exportation Act 1509 (repealed)	1 Hen. 8. c. 13	23 February 1510
An Act against carrying out of this Realm any Coin, Plate or Jewels. (Repealed by Statute Law Revision Act 1863 (26 & 27 Vict. c. 125))
Apparel Act 1509 (repealed)	1 Hen. 8. c. 14	23 February 1510
An Act against wearing of costly Apparel. (Repealed by Statute Law Revision Act 1863 (26 & 27 Vict. c. 125))
Lands of Empson and Dudley Act 1509 (repealed)	1 Hen. 8. c. 15	23 February 1510
An Act concerning Lands made in Trust to Empson and Dudley. (Repealed by Statute Law Revision Act 1953 (2 & 3 Eliz. 2. c. 5))
Expenses of King's Household Act 1509 (repealed)	1 Hen. 8. c. 16 (Note: This is the citation in The Statutes of the Realm.); 1 Hen. 8. c. 1 Pr. (Note: This is the citation in The Statutes at Large.)	23 February 1510
An Acte for the Expences of the Kinges Howsehold. (Repealed by Expenses of King's Household Act 1523 (14 & 15 Hen. 8. c. 19))
Expenses of King's Wardrobe Act 1509 (repealed)	1 Hen. 8. c. 17; 1 Hen. 8. c. 2 Pr.	23 February 1510
An Acte for the assignment of money for the Kinges greate Warderobe. (Repealed by Statute Law Revision Act 1863 (26 & 27 Vict. c. 125))
Dower of Queen Katherine Act 1509 (repealed)	1 Hen. 8. c. 18; 1 Hen. 8. c. 3 Pr.	23 February 1510
An Acte for confirmacion of tres Patentes made to Quene Katheryn for her Dower. (Repealed by Statute Law Revision Act 1953 (2 & 3 Eliz. 2. c. 5))
Restitution of Robert Ratcliffe Act 1509 (repealed)	1 Hen. 8. c. 19; 1 Hen. 8. c. 4 Pr.	23 February 1510
An Acte for the restitucion of Robte Ratclyffe Knight Lord Fitzwater. (Repealed by Statute Law (Repeals) Act 1977 (c. 18))
Taxation Act 1509 (repealed)	1 Hen. 8. c. 20; 1 Hen. 8. c. 5 Pr.	23 February 1510
An Acte for a Subsidy to be graunted to the Kyne. (Repealed by Statute Law Revision Act 1863 (26 & 27 Vict. c. 125))

=== Sources ===
- "1° Hen. VIII". The Statutes of the Realm. Vol. 3: 1509 to 1547. pp. 1–22 – via HathiTrust.
- "1° Hen. VIII". The Statutes of the Realm. Vol. 3: 1509 to 1547. pp. 1–22 – via Google Books.
- "Anno primo Henrici VIII". The Statutes at Large. Vol. 4 - 1 Richard III to 31 Henry VIII - 1483-4 to 1539. pp. 104–111 – via Internet Archive.
- "Anno primo Henrici VIII". The Statutes at Large. Vol. 4 - 1 Richard III to 31 Henry VIII - 1483-4 to 1539. pp. 104–111 – via Internet Archive.
- "Anno primo Henrici VIII". The Statutes at Large. Vol. 4 - 1 Richard III to 31 Henry VIII - 1483-4 to 1539. pp. 104–111 – via Internet Archive.
- Journal of the House of Lords. Vol. 1: 1509-1577. London: His Majesty's Stationery Office. 1830 – via British History Online.
- Chronological Table of and Index to the Statutes. Vol. 1: To the End of the Session 59 Vict. Sess. 2 (1895) (13th ed.). London: Her Majesty's Stationery Office. 1896. p. 43 – via Google Books.
- Chronological Table of the Statutes: Covering the Period from 1235 to the End of 1971. London: Her Majesty's Stationery Office. 1972. p. 38. ISBN 978-0-11-840096-1 – via Google Books.

== See also ==
- List of acts of the Parliament of England
