= Knight of the shire =

Formal title of MPs from county constituencies

Parliamentary Elections Act 1444
- Act of Parliament
- Parliament of England
- Long title: None
- Citation: 23 Hen. 6. c. 14
- Territorial extent: England and Wales; Ireland

Dates
- Royal assent: 1445
- Commencement: 25 February 1445 (Note: Start of session.)
- Repealed: England and Wales: 18 July 1972; Ireland: 10 August 1872

Other legislation
- Amended by: Parliamentary Elections (No. 2) Act 1774
- Repealed by: England and Wales: Ballot Act 1872; Ireland: Statute Law (Ireland) Revision Act 1872
- Relates to: Parliamentary Elections Act 1413; Electors of Knights of the Shires Act 1429; Electors of Knights of the Shire Act 1432

Status: Repealed

Text of statute as originally enacted

Knight of the shire (Latin: milites comitatus) was the formal title for a member of parliament (MP) representing a county constituency in the British House of Commons, from its origins in the medieval Parliament of England until the Redistribution of Seats Act 1885 ended the practice of each county (or shire) forming a single constituency. The corresponding titles for other MPs were burgess in a borough constituency (or citizen if the borough had city status) and baron for a Cinque Ports constituency. Knights of the shire had more prestige than burgesses, and sitting burgesses often stood for election for the shire in the hope of increasing their standing in Parliament.

The name "knight of the shire" originally implied that the representative had to be a knight, and the writ of election referred to a belted knight until the 19th century; but by the 14th century men who were not knights were commonly elected. An act of Henry VI, the Parliamentary Elections Act 1444 (23 Hen. 6. c. 14) stipulated that those eligible for election were knights and "such notable esquires and gentlemen as have estates sufficient to be knights, and by no means of the degree of yeoman".

So that the Knights of the Shires for the Parliament hereafter to be chosen, shall be notable Knights of the same Counties for the which they shall [so] be chosen, or otherwise such notable Esquires, Gentlemen [of birth] of the same Counties, as shall be able to be Knights; and no Man to be such Knight which standeth in the Degree of a Yeoman and under. — Parliamentary Elections Act 1444 (23 Hen. 6. c. 14)

From Simon de Montfort's Parliament in 1265, each shire sent two knights, and the number was standard until 1826 when Yorkshire gained two additional knights after the disfranchisement of Borough of Grampound. Under the Representation of the People Act 1832 (2 & 3 Will. 4. c. 65) counties with larger populations sent more knights than smaller ones. The Redistribution of Seats Act 1885 (48 & 49 Vict. c. 23) split each multiple-seat shire into multiple single-seat divisions. This change, together with the concomitant standardisation of the franchise, means that county and borough constituencies now differ only slightly, as to election expenses and their type of returning officer.

The term "knight of the shire" has been used more recently in a tongue-in-cheek manner for senior Conservative Party backbenchers representing rural constituencies in England and Wales.

== Middle Ages ==
The precursor to the English parliamentary system was a Magnum Concilium or great council, an advice chamber to the king consisting of peers, ecclesiastics, and knights of the shire (with the king summoning two of these from each county). In 1264, this council evolved to include representatives from the boroughs (burgesses), requiring that all members be elected (Montfort's Parliament). The parliament gained legislative powers in 1295 (the Model Parliament). In the following century, in 1341, Edward III split Parliament into its current bicameral structure, which includes the House of Commons and the House of Lords. It opted in 1376 to appoint Sir Peter de la Mare to convey to the Lords complaints about heavy taxes, demands for an accounting of the royal expenditures, and criticism of the king's management of the military. Although de la Mare was imprisoned for his actions, many recognised the value of a single representative voice for the Commons. Accordingly, an office of Speaker of the House of Commons was created. Mare was soon released after the death of Edward III and became the Speaker of the House again in 1377.

Before 1430, the franchise (electorate) for elections of knights of the shire was not restricted to forty-shilling freeholders. Discussing the original county franchise, historian Charles Seymour suggested, "It is probable that all free inhabitant householders voted and that the parliamentary qualification was, like that which compelled attendance in the county court, merely a 'resiance' or residence qualification." He goes on to explain why Parliament decided to legislate about the county franchise. "The Act of 1430," he said, "after declaring that elections had been crowded by many persons of low estate, and that confusion had thereby resulted, accordingly enacted that the suffrage should be limited to persons qualified by a freehold of 40s".

The Parliament of England legislated the new uniform county franchise, in the Electors of Knights of the Shires Act 1429 (8 Hen. 6. c. 7). It was included as a recital in the Electors of Knights of the Shire Act 1432 (10 Hen. 6. c. 2), which amended and re-enacted the 1430 law to make clear that the resident of a county had to have a forty-shilling freehold in that county in order to be a voter there.

Over the course of time, authorities began to consider a great number of different types of property as forty-shilling freeholds. Subsequently, the residence requirement disappeared.

== Reform ==
Until the Representation of the People Act 1832, each county continued to send two knights (apart from Yorkshire, which had its number of knights increased to four in 1826). How these knights were chosen varied from one county to the next and evolved over time. The 1832 act increased the number of knights sent by some populous counties to as many as six.

== Modern usage ==
The term became obsolete due to the final destruction of counties mentioned by the Redistribution of Seats Act 1885 and widened structure of electorate in the Representation of the People Act 1884, and in the Representation of the People Act 1918. The term rapidly died out during the 20th century in reference to Members of Parliament who represent county constituencies; for they no longer represented a whole county.

The term occasionally features as journalese to describe elderly Members of Parliament, usually any Conservative backbenchers with long service who possess a knighthood.

== See also ==
- House of Commons of England
- Parliament of Scotland
- Knights of Buckinghamshire

== Sources ==
- The text of the 1832 Reform Act
- Chronological Table of the Statutes: Part 1 1235-1962 (The Stationery Office Ltd 1999)
- Electoral Reform in England and Wales, by Charles Seymour (David & Charles Reprints 1970)
- The Statutes: Revised Edition, Vol. I Henry III to James II (printed by authority in 1876)
- The Statutes: Second Revised Edition, Vol. XVI 1884-1886 (printed by authority in 1900)
