= Coroners Act 1887 =

Act of the Parliament of the United Kingdom

Coroners Act 1887 (Note: Section 1.)
- Act of Parliament
- Parliament of the United Kingdom
- Long title: An Act to consolidate the Law related to Coroners.
- Citation: 50 & 51 Vict. c. 71
- Introduced by: Richard Webster MP (Commons); Hardinge Giffard, 1st Baron Halsbury (Lords)
- Territorial extent: England and Wales (Note: Section 2.)

Dates
- Royal assent: 16 September 1887
- Commencement: 16 September 1887 (Note: The Acts of Parliament (Commencement) Act 1793.)
- Repealed: 10 July 1988
Other legislation
Amends	See § Repealed enactments
Repeals/revokes	See § Repealed enactments
Amended by	Local Government Act 1888; Coroners Act 1892; Statute Law Revision Act 1908; Indictments Act 1915; Coroners (Amendment) Act 1926; Statute Law Revision Act 1950; Coroners Act 1954; Criminal Law Act 1967; Theft Act 1968; Courts Act 1971; Administration of Justice Act 1977; Coroners Act 1980; Coroners' Juries Act 1983
Repealed by	Coroners Act 1988
Relates to	Repeal of Obsolete Statutes Act 1856; See Statute Law Revision Act; Sheriffs Act 1887

Status: Repealed

History of passage through Parliament

Records of Parliamentary debate relating to the statute from Hansard

Text of statute as originally enacted

The Coroners Act 1887 (50 & 51 Vict. c. 71) was an act of the Parliament of the United Kingdom that consolidated for England and Wales enactments relating to coroners and repealed statutes from 1275 to 1882 which had ceased to be in force or had become necessary.

== Background ==
In the United Kingdom, acts of Parliament remain in force until expressly repealed. Blackstone's Commentaries on the Laws of England, published in the late 18th-century, raised questions about the system and structure of the common law and the poor drafting and disorder of the existing statute book.

From 1810 to 1825, The Statutes of the Realm was published, providing the first authoritative collection of acts. The first statute law revision act was not passed until 1856 with the Repeal of Obsolete Statutes Act 1856 (19 & 20 Vict. c. 64). This approach — focusing on removing obsolete laws from the statute book followed by consolidation — was proposed by Peter Locke King MP, who had been highly critical of previous commissions' approaches, expenditures, and lack of results.

Previous statute law revision acts
Year passed	Title	Citation	Effect
1861	Statute Law Revision Act 1861	24 & 25 Vict. c. 101	Repealed or amended over 800 enactments
1863	Statute Law Revision Act 1863	26 & 27 Vict. c. 125	Repealed or amended over 1,600 enactments for England and Wales
1867	Statute Law Revision Act 1867	30 & 31 Vict. c. 59	Repealed or amended over 1,380 enactments
1870	Statute Law Revision Act 1870	33 & 34 Vict. c. 69	Repealed or amended over 250 enactments
1871	Promissory Oaths Act 1871	34 & 35 Vict. c. 48	Repealed or amended almost 200 enactments
1871	Statute Law Revision Act 1871	34 & 35 Vict. c. 116	Repealed or amended over 1,060 enactments
1872	Statute Law Revision Act 1872	35 & 36 Vict. c. 63	Repealed or amended almost 490 enactments
1872	Statute Law (Ireland) Revision Act 1872	35 & 36 Vict. c. 98	Repealed or amended over 1,050 enactments
1872	Statute Law Revision Act 1872 (No. 2)	35 & 36 Vict. c. 97	Repealed or amended almost 260 enactments
1873	Statute Law Revision Act 1873	36 & 37 Vict. c. 91	Repealed or amended 1,225 enactments
1874	Statute Law Revision Act 1874	37 & 38 Vict. c. 35	Repealed or amended over 490 enactments
1874	Statute Law Revision Act 1874 (No. 2)	37 & 38 Vict. c. 96	Repealed or amended almost 470 enactments
1875	Statute Law Revision Act 1875	38 & 39 Vict. c. 66	Repealed or amended over 1,400 enactments
1876	Statute Law Revision (Substituted Enactments) Act 1876	39 & 40 Vict. c. 20	Updated references to repealed acts
1878	Statute Law Revision (Ireland) Act 1878	41 & 42 Vict. c. 57	Repealed or amended over 460 enactments passed by the Parliament of Ireland
1878	Statute Law Revision Act 1878	41 & 42 Vict. c. 79	Repealed or amended over 90 enactments.
1879	Statute Law Revision (Ireland) Act 1879	42 & 43 Vict. c. 24	Repealed or amended over 460 enactments passed by the Parliament of Ireland
1879	Civil Procedure Acts Repeal Act 1879	42 & 43 Vict. c. 59	Repealed or amended over 130 enactments
1881	Statute Law Revision and Civil Procedure Act 1881	44 & 45 Vict. c. 59	Repealed or amended or amended almost 100 enactments relating to civil procedure.
1883	Statute Law Revision Act 1883	46 & 47 Vict. c. 39	Repealed or amended over 475 enactments
1883	Statute Law Revision and Civil Procedure Act 1883	46 & 47 Vict. c. 49	Repealed or amended over 475 enactments
1887	Statute Law Revision Act 1887	50 & 51 Vict. c. 59	Repealed or amended over 200 enactments
1887	Sheriffs Act 1887	50 & 51 Vict. c. 55	Repealed or amended almost 75 enactments related to sheriffs

== Passage ==
The Coroners Bill had its first reading in the House of Lords on 19 July 1887, introduced by the Lord Chancellor, Hardinge Giffard, 1st Baron Halsbury. The bill had its second reading in the House of Lords on 21 July 1887 and was committed to a Committee of the Whole House, which met on 4 August and reported on 5 August 1887, with amendments. The amended Bill had its third reading in the House of Lords on 8 August 1887 and passed, without amendments.

The bill had its first reading in the House of Commons on 15 August 1887. The bill had its second reading in the House of Commons on 10 September 1887, introduced by the attorney general, Richard Webster MP. During debate, the bill was criticised for appearing late in the session, and for containing no provision for the fining of Coroners for neglect of duty. The bill was committed to a Committee of the Whole House, which was delayed several times, receiving criticism from MPs. The Committee which met and reported on 13 September 1887, with amendments. The bill had its third reading in the House of Commons on 13 September 1887 and passed, with amendments.

The amended bill was considered and agreed to by the House of Lords on 13 September 1887.

The bill was granted royal assent on 16 September 1887.

== Subsequent developments ==
Part of section 45 and the third schedule to the act were repealed by section 1 of, and the schedule to, the Statute Law Revision Act 1908 (8 Edw. 7. c. 49)), which came into force on 21 December 1908.

Section 31 of the act was repealed by section 1(1) of, and the first schedule to, the Statute Law Revision Act 1950 (14 Geo. 6. c. 6), which came into force on 23 May 1950.

Section 44 of the act was repealed by section 10(2) of, and part I of schedule 3 to, the Criminal Law Act 1967, which came into force on 1 January 1968.

The whole act was repealed by section 36(2) of, and schedule 4 to, the Coroners Act 1988, which came into force on 10 July 1988.

== Provisions ==
=== Repealed enactments ===
Section 45 of the act repealed 33 enactments, listed in the third schedule to the act.

Section 45 of the act included several safeguards to ensure that the repeal does not negatively affect existing rights or ongoing legal matters, including:

1. The continuation in office of coroners elected before the act's passing
2. The preservation of existing fee schedules and allowances until new ones were made
3. The protection of past operations of any repealed enactments
4. The preservation of rights, privileges, obligations, or liabilities acquired or incurred under repealed enactments
5. The continuation of penalties and punishments for offences committed against repealed enactments
6. The ability to continue any inquests, investigations, or legal proceedings that began before the act
7. The preservation of existing jurisdictions, offices, customs, and practices that were in force at the time of passing

Citation	Short title	Title	Extent of repeal
3 Edw. 1. c. 9	Pursuit of felons	The statutes of Westminster the first. Chapter nine; pursuit of felons. Punishment for neglect or corruption in officers.	The whole chapter, so far as relates to coroners.
3 Edw. 1. c. 10	Coroners	The statutes of Westminster the first. Chapter ten, who shall be chosen coroners. Their duty.	The whole chapter.
4 Edw. 1	Officium Coronatoris	The office of the coroner.	The whole statute.
12 Edw. 1. c. 5	Statuta Wallie	The statutes of Wales. Chapter five; of the office of coroner, that is to say, of the pleas of the Crown in Wales.	The whole chapter.
12 Edw. 1. c. 6	Statuta Wallie	The statutes of Wales. Chapter six; the form of the King's writs to be pleaded in Wales.	So much of the chapter as relates to the form of the writ for choosing a coroner.
28 Edw. 1. Articuli super Cartas c. 3	Inquests within Verge, etc. Act 1300	Articles upon the charter. Chapter three; of what things only the steward and marshal of the King's House shall hold pleas. What coroners shall inquire of the death of a man slain within the verge.	The whole chapter.
1 Edw. 3. stat. 2. c. 17	Indictments	Statutes made at Westminster. Statute the first. Indictments shall be taken by Indenture.	The whole chapter so far as it relates to coroners. (Note: This act was already repealed by the Sheriffs Act 1887 (50 & 51 Vict. c. 55))
14 Edw. 3. stat. 1. c. 8	Escheators and coroners	Statute the first. Chapter eight; coroners; their number, appointment, and office. Coroners; their sufficiency.	The whole chapter.
28 Edw. 3. c. 6	Election of Coroners Act 1354	Coroners shall be chosen by the commons of the counties.	The whole chapter.
23 Hen. 6. c. 9	Sheriffs and Bailiffs, Fees, etc. Act 1444	No sheriff shall let his county to ferm.	The whole chapter, so far as it relates to coroners.
3 Hen. 7. c. 2	Recognizances Act 1487	An Acte agaynst murderers.	The whole act, except from "And also be yt ordyned by the authority aforesaid," to the end of the chapter.
1 Hen. 8. c. 7	Coroners Act 1509	An Acte concerning coroners.	The whole act.
33 Hen. 8. c. 12	Offences within the Court Act 1541	An Acte for murther and malicious bloodshed within the Courte.	Section one from "And that all inquiricions upon the viewe of psons slayne," down to the end of the section, section eight, section nine, section ten from "or within two hundred" to the end of the section, and section eleven.
34 & 35 Hen. 8. c. 26	Laws in Wales Act 1542	An Acte for certaine ordinaunces in the Kinges Majesties dominion and principalitie of Wales.	Section twenty-five.
25 Geo. 2. c. 29	Coroners Act 1751	An Act for giving a proper reward to coroners for the due execution of their office, and for the removal of coroners upon a lawful conviction for certain misdemeanors.	So much as is unrepealed.
6 Geo. 4. c. 50	Juries Act 1825	An Act for consolidating and amending the laws relative to jurors and juries.	Section fifty-three, so far as relates to a coroner upon an inquest.
7 Geo. 4. c. 64	Criminal Law Act 1826	An Act for improving the administration of criminal justice in England.	Section four and so much of sections five and six as relates to coroners.
6 & 7 Will. 4. c. 87	Liberties Act 1836	An Act for extinguishing the secular jurisdiction of the Archbishop of York and the Bishop of Ely in certain liberties in the counties of York, Nottingham, and Cambridge.	Section ten from "and that the present coroner" to the end of the section, and section sixteen.
6 & 7 Will. 4. c. 89	Coroners (Ireland) Act 1836	An Act to provide for the attendance and remuneration of medical witnesses at coroners inquests.	The whole act, except so far as it relates to Ireland.
7 Will. 4 and 1 Vict. c. 64	County of Durham Coroners Act 1837	An Act for regulating the coroners of the county of Durham.	The whole act.
7 Will. 4 and 1 Vict. c. 68	Coroners' Inquests Expenses Act 1837	An Act to provide for payment of the expenses of holding coroners inquests.	The whole act.
6 & 7 Vict. c. 12	Coroners Act 1843	An Act for the more convenient holding of coroners inquests.	The whole act, so far as relates to England.
6 & 7 Vict. c. 83	Coroners (No. 2) Act 1843	An Act to amend the law respecting the duties of coroners.	The whole act.
7 & 8 Vict. c. 92	Coroners Act 1844	An Act to amend the law respecting the office of county coroner.	Sections eight to eighteen, sections twenty-two to twenty-six, and section thirty.
22 Vict. c. 33	Coroners' Inquests, Bail Act 1859	An Act to enable coroners in England to admit to bail persons charged with manslaughter.	The whole act.
22 & 23 Vict. c. 21	Queen's Remembrancer Act 1859	An Act to regulate the office of Queen's Remembrancer, and to amend the practice and procedure on the revenue side of the Court of Exchequer.	Section forty.
23 & 24 Vict. c. 116	County Coroners Act 1860	An Act to amend the law relating to the election, duties, and payment of county coroners.	Section one to section six, section seven from "hereby repealed and," and section nine.
29 & 30 Vict. c. 90	Sanitary Act 1866	The Sanitary Act, 1866.	Section twenty-eight from "and where any such place has been provided" to the end of the section, so far as it relates to any part of England.
31 & 32 Vict. c. 24	Capital Punishment Amendment Act 1868	The Capital Punishment Amendment Act, 1868.	Section five from "no officer of the prison" to the end of the section.
37 & 38 Vict. c. 88	Births and Deaths Registration Act 1874	The Births and Deaths Registration Act, 1874.	In section sixteen the words "the jury shall require of the particulars required to be registered concerning the death and," section seventeen from the first "upon holding an inquest" to "registry of the death and," and from "and except on holding an inquest" down to "shall be given by the coroner."
38 & 39 Vict. c. 55	Public Health Act 1875	The Public Health Act, 1875.	Section one hundred and forty-three from "and where any such place has been provided" to the end of the section.
40 & 41 Vict. c. 21	Prison Act 1877	The Prison Act, 1877.	Section forty-four.
45 & 46 Vict. c. 50	Municipal Corporations Act 1882	The Municipal Corporations Act, 1882.	Section one hundred and seventy-one from "and thereafter" down to "office of coroner," section one hundred and seventy-three, section one hundred and seventy-four.

== See also ==
- Statute Law Revision Act
