= Treason Act 1442 =

Act of the Parliament of England

- Act of Parliament
- Parliament of England
- Long title: It shall be high treason for Welshmen to take and carry away Englishmen or their goods into Wales, or there to withhold them
- Citation: 20 Hen. 6. c. 3
- Territorial extent: England and Wales; Ireland

Dates
- Royal assent: 27 March 1442
- Commencement: 25 January 1442 (Note: Start of session.)
- Repealed: England and Wales: 28 July 1863; Ireland: 10 August 1872
Other legislation
Amended by	Treason Act 1448
Repealed by	England and Wales: Statute Law Revision Act 1863; Ireland: Statute Law (Ireland) Revision Act 1872
Relates to	20 Hen. 4. c. 16

Status: Repealed

Text of statute as originally enacted

Treason Act 1448
- Act of Parliament
- Parliament of England
- Long title: A rehearsal and confirmation for three years of the statute of 26 Hen. Vi. cap. 3. provided against Welshmen that take any Englishmen, their goods and chattels, and carry them into Wales.
- Citation: 27 Hen. 6. c. 4
- Territorial extent: England and Wales; Ireland

Dates
- Royal assent: 16 July 1449
- Commencement: 12 February 1449 (Note: Start of session.)
- Repealed: England and Wales: 28 July 1863; Ireland: 10 August 1872
Other legislation
Amends	Treason Act 1442
Repealed by	England and Wales: Statute Law Revision Act 1863; Ireland: Statute Law (Ireland) Revision Act 1872

Status: Repealed

Text of statute as originally enacted

The Treason Act 1442 (20 Hen. 6. c. 3) was an act of the Parliament of England that made it high treason for any Welshman to "drive, bring, carry away, or withhold" any Englishman or any Englishman's horse, cattle or goods.

The act was due to expire after six years, but was renewed for a further six years by the Treason Act 1448 (27 Hen. 6. c. 4), after which it was allowed to expire.

== Subsequent developments ==
The act was extended to Ireland by Poynings' Law 1495 (10 Hen. 7. c. 22 (I)).

The whole act was repealed for England and Wales by section 1 of, and the schedule to, the Statute Law Revision Act 1863 (26 & 27 Vict. c. 125), which came into force on 28 July 1863.

The whole act was repealed for Ireland by section 1 of, and the schedule to, the Statute Law (Ireland) Revision Act 1872 (35 & 36 Vict. c. 98), which came into force on 10 August 1872.

== See also ==
- High treason in the United Kingdom
- Treason Act
