= Parliamentary Elections (No. 2) Act 1774 =

Act of the Parliament of Great Britain

- Act of Parliament
- Parliament of Great Britain
- Long title: An Act for repealing an Act made in the First Year of the Reign of King Henry the Fifth, and so much of several Acts of the Eighth, Tenth, and Twenty-third Years of King Henry the Sixth, as relates to the Residence of Persons to be elected Members to serve in Parliament, or of the Persons by whom they are to be chosen.
- Citation: 14 Geo. 3. c. 58
- Territorial extent: Great Britain

Dates
- Royal assent: 2 June 1774
- Commencement: 13 January 1774 (Note: Start of session.)
- Repealed: 21 August 1871

Other legislation
- Amends: Electors of Knights of the Shires Act 1429; Electors of Knights of the Shire Act 1432; Parliamentary Elections Act 1444
- Repeals/revokes: Parliamentary Elections Act 1413
- Repealed by: Statute Law Revision Act 1871

Status: Repealed

Text of statute as originally enacted

The Parliamentary Elections (No. 2) Act 1774 (14 Geo. 3. c. 58) was an act of the Parliament of Great Britain.

The act removed the requirement for residence for knights of the shire and burgesses to serve in parliament and abolished the outdated requirement that voters must reside in the county where their qualifying freehold property was located.

== Provisions ==
Section 1 of the act repealed the Parliamentary Elections Act 1413 (1 Hen. 5 c. 1) and so much of the Electors of Knights of the Shires Act 1429 (8 Hen. 6. c. 7), Electors of Knights of the Shire Act 1432 (10 Hen. 6. c. 2) and Parliamentary Elections Act 1444 (23 Hen. 6. c. 14) "as relates to the residence of persons to be elected members to serve in parliament, or of the persons by whom they are to be chosen".

== Subsequent developments ==
The whole act was repealed for England and Wales by section 1 of, and the schedule to, the Statute Law Revision Act 1871 (34 & 35 Vict. c. 116), which came into force on 21 August 1871.
