= List of acts of the Parliament of England, 1422–1460 =

This is a list of acts of the Parliament of England for the years 1411 until 1460.

For acts passed during the period 1707–1800, see the list of acts of the Parliament of Great Britain. See also the list of acts of the Parliament of Scotland and the list of acts of the Parliament of Ireland.

For acts passed from 1801 onwards, see the list of acts of the Parliament of the United Kingdom. For acts of the devolved parliaments and assemblies in the United Kingdom, see the list of acts of the Scottish Parliament, the list of acts of the Northern Ireland Assembly, and the list of acts and measures of Senedd Cymru; see also the list of acts of the Parliament of Northern Ireland.

For medieval statutes, etc. that are not considered to be acts of Parliament, see the list of English statutes.

The number shown after each act's title is its chapter number. Acts are cited using this number, preceded by the year(s) of the reign during which the relevant parliamentary session was held; thus the Union with Ireland Act 1800 is cited as "39 & 40 Geo. 3. c. 67", meaning the 67th act passed during the session that started in the 39th year of the reign of George III and which finished in the 40th year of that reign. Note that the modern convention is to use Arabic numerals in citations (thus "41 Geo. 3" rather than "41 Geo. III"). Acts of the last session of the Parliament of Great Britain and the first session of the Parliament of the United Kingdom are both cited as "41 Geo. 3".

Acts passed by the Parliament of England did not have a short title; however, some of these acts have subsequently been given a short title by acts of the Parliament of the United Kingdom (such as the Short Titles Act 1896).

Acts passed by the Parliament of England were deemed to have come into effect on the first day of the session in which they were passed. Because of this, the years given in the list below may in fact be the year before a particular Act was passed.

== 1422 (1 Hen. 6) ==
The 1st Parliament of King Henry VI, which met at Westminster from 9 November 1422 until 18 December 1422.

This session was also traditionally cited as 1 H. 6.

- (Mint) c. 1 The King's council may assign money to be coined in as many places as they will. — repealed for England and Wales by Statute Law Revision Act 1863 (26 & 27 Vict. c. 125) and for Ireland by Statute Law (Ireland) Revision Act 1872 (35 & 36 Vict. c. 98)
- (Purveyance) c. 2 All the statutes of purveyors shall be proclaimed in every county four times in the year. — repealed for England and Wales by Statute Law Revision Act 1863 (26 & 27 Vict. c. 125) and for Ireland by Statute Law (Ireland) Revision Act 1872 (35 & 36 Vict. c. 98)
- (Irishmen) c. 3 What sort of Irishmen only may come to dwell in England. — repealed by Repeal of Obsolete Statutes Act 1856 (19 & 20 Vict. c. 64)
- (Mint) c. 4 The master of the mint shall send to the mint to be coined all the gold and silver that shall come to his hands by exchange. — repealed for England and Wales by Statute Law Revision Act 1863 (26 & 27 Vict. c. 125) and for Ireland by Statute Law (Ireland) Revision Act 1872 (35 & 36 Vict. c. 98)
- c. 5 A certain allowance made to those which were retained to serve King Hen. V. in his wars. Provision for the redemption of the jewels mortgages by King. Hen. V. — repealed for England and Wales by Statute Law Revision Act 1863 (26 & 27 Vict. c. 125) and for Ireland by Statute Law (Ireland) Revision Act 1872 (35 & 36 Vict. c. 98)
- (Exchanges) c. 6 The stat. of 9. Hen. V. c. 9. (Note: Exchanges Act 1421 (9 Hen. 5. Stat. 2. c. 9)) touching security of exchanges to be made by merchants of the court of Rome, revived, and continued till the next parliament. — repealed for England and Wales by Statute Law Revision Act 1863 (26 & 27 Vict. c. 125) and for Ireland by Statute Law (Ireland) Revision Act 1872 (35 & 36 Vict. c. 98)

=== Sources ===
- Chronological Table of and Index to the Statutes. Vol. 1: To the End of the Session 59 Vict. Sess. 2 (1895) (13th ed.). London: Her Majesty's Stationery Office. 1896. p. 35 – via Google Books.
- Chronological Table of the Statutes: Covering the Period from 1235 to the End of 1971. London: Her Majesty's Stationery Office. 1972. p. 30. ISBN 978-0-11-840096-1 – via Google Books.

== 1423 (2 Hen. 6) ==
The 2nd Parliament of King Henry VI, which met at Westminster from 20 October 1423 until 28 February 1424.

This session was also traditionally cited as 2 H. 6.

- Confirmation of Liberties 1423 c. 1 A confirmation of the liberties of the church, and of all persons, cities, &c. —
  still in force
- St Leonard's Hospital York Act 1423 c. 2 A remedy for the master, &c. of the Hospital of St. Leonard in York, to recover a thrave of corn due to them, &c. — repealed by Statute Law Revision Act 1948 (11 & 12 Geo. 6. c. 62)
- Duke of Bedford Act 1423 c. 3 John duke of Bedford, being in the King's service in France, shall be received to defend his right by attorney. — repealed for England and Wales by Statute Law Revision Act 1863 (26 & 27 Vict. c. 125) and for Ireland by Statute Law (Ireland) Revision Act 1872 (35 & 36 Vict. c. 98)
- (Staple) c. 4 All merchanises of the staple passing out of England, Wales, and Ireland, shall be carried to Calais, so long as the staple is at Calais. — repealed for England and Wales by Statute Law Revision Act 1863 (26 & 27 Vict. c. 125) and for Ireland by Statute Law (Ireland) Revision Act 1872 (35 & 36 Vict. c. 98)
- (Exportation of Wools) c. 5 The penalty if any carry wools or fells not customed out of the realm to any place, saving to Calais. — repealed by Repeal of Acts Concerning Importation Act 1822 (3 Geo. 4. c. 41)
- (Exportation of Gold or Silver) c. 6 For what causes only gold or silver may be carried out of the realm. — repealed for England and Wales by Statute Law Revision Act 1863 (26 & 27 Vict. c. 125) and for Ireland by Statute Law (Ireland) Revision Act 1872 (35 & 36 Vict. c. 98)
- (Tanners) c. 7 The penalty of a cordwainer using the mystery of a tanner. — repealed for England and Wales by Statute Law Revision Act 1863 (26 & 27 Vict. c. 125) and for Ireland by Statute Law (Ireland) Revision Act 1872 (35 & 36 Vict. c. 98)
- (Irishmen) c. 8 Irishmen resorting into the realm, shall be put in surety for their good abearing. — repealed for England and Wales by Statute Law Revision Act 1863 (26 & 27 Vict. c. 125) and for Ireland by Statute Law (Ireland) Revision Act 1872 (35 & 36 Vict. c. 98)
- (Currency) c. 9 The money called blanks shall be wholly put out. — repealed for England and Wales by Statute Law Revision Act 1863 (26 & 27 Vict. c. 125) and for Ireland by Statute Law (Ireland) Revision Act 1872 (35 & 36 Vict. c. 98)
- (Embroidery) c. 10 A penalty on deceitful workers of gold and silver embroidery. — repealed for England and Wales by Statute Law Revision Act 1863 (26 & 27 Vict. c. 125) and for Ireland by Statute Law (Ireland) Revision Act 1872 (35 & 36 Vict. c. 98)
- (Certain Outlawries) c. 11 Concerning the reversal of outlawries pronounced against persons whilst abroad in the King's service. — repealed for England and Wales by Statute Law Revision Act 1863 (26 & 27 Vict. c. 125) and for Ireland by Statute Law (Ireland) Revision Act 1872 (35 & 36 Vict. c. 98)
- (River Thames) c. 12 The justices shall inquire into and remove certain nuisances on the Thames. — repealed for England and Wales by Statute Law Revision Act 1863 (26 & 27 Vict. c. 125) and for Ireland by Statute Law (Ireland) Revision Act 1872 (35 & 36 Vict. c. 98)
- (Patent Officers in Courts) c. 13 What manner of inferior officers shall be appointed in the King's courts. — repealed for England and Wales by Statute Law Revision Act 1863 (26 & 27 Vict. c. 125) and for Ireland by Statute Law (Ireland) Revision Act 1872 (35 & 36 Vict. c. 98)
- Measures Act 1423 c. 14 The several measures of vessels of wine, eels, herrings, and salmons. — repealed by Repeal of Acts Concerning Importation Act 1822 (3 Geo. 4. c. 41) and Weights and Measures Act 1824 (5 Geo. 4. c. 74)
- (Mint) c. 15 The office and duty of the King's assayer, controllour, and master of the mint. — repealed for England and Wales by Statute Law Revision Act 1863 (26 & 27 Vict. c. 125) and for Ireland by Statute Law (Ireland) Revision Act 1872 (35 & 36 Vict. c. 98)
- (Price of Silver) c. 16 The price of a pound of silver in plate, piece, or mass. — repealed for England and Wales by Continuance, etc. of Laws Act 1623 (21 Jas. 1. c. 28) and for Ireland by Statute Law (Ireland) Revision Act 1872 (35 & 36 Vict. c. 98)
- Quality and Marks of Silver Work Act 1423 c. 17 The Fineness of Harness of Silver, and the Marks with which it shall be marked. — repealed by Statute Law Revision Act 1953 (2 & 3 Eliz. 2. c. 5)
- (Labourers) c. 18 Justices may punish servants, masons, carpenters, &c. for taking unreasonable wages. — repealed for England and Wales by Statute Law Revision Act 1863 (26 & 27 Vict. c. 125) and for Ireland by Statute Law (Ireland) Revision Act 1872 (35 & 36 Vict. c. 98)
- (Fish) c. 19 No man shall fasten nets to any thing over rivers. — repealed for England and Wales by Salmon Fishery Act 1861 (24 & 25 Vict. c. 109) and for Ireland by Statute Law (Ireland) Revision Act 1872 (35 & 36 Vict. c. 98)
- (Real Actions) c. 20 Persons in the reversion may sue for the right to estates, notwithstanding any defaults committed by the former possessors. — repealed for England and Wales by Statute Law Revision Act 1863 (26 & 27 Vict. c. 125) and for Ireland by Statute Law (Ireland) Revision Act 1872 (35 & 36 Vict. c. 98)
- Escape Act 1423 c. 21 Persons indicted of high treason escaping out of prison shall be adjudged traitors. — repealed for England and Wales by Statute Law Revision Act 1863 (26 & 27 Vict. c. 125) and for Ireland by Statute Law (Ireland) Revision Act 1872 (35 & 36 Vict. c. 98)

=== Sources ===
- Chronological Table of and Index to the Statutes. Vol. 1: To the End of the Session 59 Vict. Sess. 2 (1895) (13th ed.). London: Her Majesty's Stationery Office. 1896. p. 35 – via Google Books.
- Chronological Table of the Statutes: Covering the Period from 1235 to the End of 1971. London: Her Majesty's Stationery Office. 1972. p. 30. ISBN 978-0-11-840096-1 – via Google Books.
- "Acts of the English Parliament from 1423". legislation.gov.uk. The National Archives.

== 1425 ==
=== 3 Hen. 6 ===
The 3rd Parliament of King Henry VI, which met at Westminster from 30 April 1425 until 14 July 1425.

This session was also traditionally cited as 3 H. 6.

- Labourers Act 1425 c. 1 Masons shall not confederate themselves in chapiters and assemblies. — repealed by Combinations of Workmen Act 1825 (6 Geo. 4. c. 129)
- (Exportation of Sheep) c. 2 Sheep shall not be transported beyond sea without the King's licence. — repealed by Repeal of Acts Concerning Importation Act 1822 (3 Geo. 4. c. 41)
- (Customs) c. 3 The penalty of a customer, &c. concealing the King's custom. — repealed by Customs Law Repeal Act 1825 (6 Geo. 4. c. 105)
- (Exportation of Butter, etc.) c. 4 Licence may be granted to convey butter and cheese to any place. — repealed by Repeal of Acts Concerning Importation Act 1822 (3 Geo. 4. c. 41)
- River Lee Navigation Act 1425 c. 5 Chancellor may award commissions to reform the River Lee. — repealed by Statute Law Revision Act 1948 (11 & 12 Geo. 6. c. 62)

==== Sources ====
- Chronological Table of and Index to the Statutes. Vol. 1: To the End of the Session 59 Vict. Sess. 2 (1895) (13th ed.). London: Her Majesty's Stationery Office. 1896. p. 35 – via Google Books.
- Chronological Table of the Statutes: Covering the Period from 1235 to the End of 1971. London: Her Majesty's Stationery Office. 1972. p. 31. ISBN 978-0-11-840096-1 – via Google Books.

=== 4 Hen. 6 ===
The 4th Parliament of King Henry VI (the 'Parliament of Bats'), which met at Leicester from 18 February 1426 until 1 June 1426.

This session was also traditionally cited as 4 H. 6.

- (Sheriffs) c. 1 Every sheriff shall return such writs as be directed to him at such days as they be returnable, and shall warn those jurors which be impannelled. — repealed for England and Wales by Statute Law Revision Act 1863 (26 & 27 Vict. c. 125) and for Ireland by Statute Law (Ireland) Revision Act 1872 (35 & 36 Vict. c. 98)
- (Continuance of Statutes) c. 2 A rehearsal and confirmation of the statute of 9 Hen. V. c. 3. (Note: Assizes Protection, etc. Act 1421 (9 Hen. 5. Stat. 1. c. 3)) touching protections granted to those who were in the wars in Normandy or France. — repealed for England and Wales by Statute Law Revision Act 1863 (26 & 27 Vict. c. 125) and for Ireland by Statute Law (Ireland) Revision Act 1872 (35 & 36 Vict. c. 98)
- (Amendment) c. 3 Justices in certain cases may amend their records according to former statutes. — repealed for England and Wales by Statute Law Revision and Civil Procedure Act 1883 (46 & 47 Vict. c. 49) and for Northern Ireland by Statute Law Revision Act 1950 (14 Geo. 6. c. 6)
- (Writs) c. 4 The writs, suits, and processes now depending of certain that were late made knights, shall not abate for that cause. — repealed for England and Wales by Statute Law Revision Act 1863 (26 & 27 Vict. c. 125) and for Ireland by Statute Law (Ireland) Revision Act 1872 (35 & 36 Vict. c. 98)
- (Corn) c. 5 Licence given to all the King's subjects to transport corn. — repealed for England and Wales by Statute Law Revision Act 1863 (26 & 27 Vict. c. 125) and for Ireland by Statute Law (Ireland) Revision Act 1872 (35 & 36 Vict. c. 98)

==== Sources ====
- Chronological Table of and Index to the Statutes. Vol. 1: To the End of the Session 59 Vict. Sess. 2 (1895) (13th ed.). London: Her Majesty's Stationery Office. 1896. p. 35 – via Google Books.
- Chronological Table of the Statutes: Covering the Period from 1235 to the End of 1971. London: Her Majesty's Stationery Office. 1972. p. 31. ISBN 978-0-11-840096-1 – via Google Books.

== 1427 (6 Hen. 6) ==
The 5th Parliament of King Henry VI, which met at Westminster from 13 October 1427 until 25 March 1428.

This session was also traditionally cited as 6 H. 6.

- (Exigent on Indictment) c. 1 Within what time a Capias awarded against any person indicted in the king's bench shall be returnable. — repealed by Administration of Justice (Miscellaneous Provisions) Act 1938 (1 & 2 Geo. 6. c. 63)
- (Assizes) c. 2 How long time the copies of panels in assise shall be delivered to the parties before the sessions to the justices. — repealed for England and Wales by Statute Law Revision Act 1863 (26 & 27 Vict. c. 125) and for Ireland by Statute Law (Ireland) Revision Act 1872 (35 & 36 Vict. c. 98)
- (Wages of Artificers) c. 3 The justices of peace, &c. shall assign the wages of artificers and workmen by proclamation; and the penalty of those that take more. — repealed for England and Wales by Statute Law Revision Act 1863 (26 & 27 Vict. c. 125) and for Ireland by Statute Law (Ireland) Revision Act 1872 (35 & 36 Vict. c. 98)
- Parliament Act 1427 c. 4 The sheriffs traverse to an inquest found touching returning knights of the shires for the parliament. — repealed by Repeal of Obsolete Statutes Act 1856 (19 & 20 Vict. c. 64)
- Sewers Act 1427 or the Commissioners of Sewers Act 1427 c. 5 Several commissions of sewers shall be granted. The form of the commission. — repealed for England and Wales by Statute Law Revision Act 1863 (26 & 27 Vict. c. 125) and for Ireland by Statute Law (Ireland) Revision Act 1872 (35 & 36 Vict. c. 98)
- (Wool) c. 6 All merchants may ship merchandise in Melcomb haven, and carry them to Calais. — repealed for England and Wales by Statute Law Revision Act 1863 (26 & 27 Vict. c. 125) and for Ireland by Statute Law (Ireland) Revision Act 1872 (35 & 36 Vict. c. 98)

=== Sources ===
- Chronological Table of and Index to the Statutes. Vol. 1: To the End of the Session 59 Vict. Sess. 2 (1895) (13th ed.). London: Her Majesty's Stationery Office. 1896. p. 36 – via Google Books.
- Chronological Table of the Statutes: Covering the Period from 1235 to the End of 1971. London: Her Majesty's Stationery Office. 1972. p. 31. ISBN 978-0-11-840096-1 – via Google Books.

== 1429 (8 Hen. 6) ==
The 6th Parliament of King Henry VI, which met at Westminster from 22 September 1429 until 23 February 1430.

This session was also traditionally cited as 8 H. 6.

- Privileges of Clergy Act 1492 c. 1 The clergy of the convocation shall have such liberty as the great men and commonalty which come to the parliament. — repealed for Northern Ireland by Statute Law Revision Act 1950 (14 Geo. 6. c. 6) and for England and Wales by Statute Law (Repeals) Act 1969 (c. 52)
- Trade with Denmark Act 1429 c. 2 No merchants of England shall enter into the dominion of the King of Denmark, but at Northbarn. — repealed for England and Wales by the Repeal of the Trade with Denmark Act 1429 Act 1509 (1 Hen. 8. c. 1), confirmed for the United Kingdom by Repeal of Acts Concerning Importation Act 1822 (3 Geo. 4. c. 41)
- Commissioners of Sewers Act 1492 c. 3 Commissioners of sewers may execute their own ordinance. — repealed for England and Wales by Statute Law Revision Act 1863 (26 & 27 Vict. c. 125) and for Ireland by Statute Law (Ireland) Revision Act 1872 (35 & 36 Vict. c. 98)
- (Liveries) c. 4 None shall buy nor wear a livery to have maintenance in any quarrel. — repealed for England and Wales by Continuance of Laws, etc. Act 1627 (3 Cha. 1. c. 5) and for Ireland by Statute Law (Ireland) Revision Act 1872 (35 & 36 Vict. c. 98)
- Weights, etc. Act 1429 c. 5 Every city and borough shall have a common balance and weight. Who may buy wool and yarn. — repealed for England and Wales by Statute Law Revision Act 1863 (26 & 27 Vict. c. 125) and for Ireland by Statute Law (Ireland) Revision Act 1872 (35 & 36 Vict. c. 98)
- Treason Act 1429 c. 6 If any threaten by casting of bills to burn a house, if money be not laid in a certain place; and after do burn the house: Such burning of houses shall be adjudged high treason. — repealed for England and Wales by Statute Law Revision Act 1863 (26 & 27 Vict. c. 125) and for Ireland by Statute Law (Ireland) Revision Act 1872 (35 & 36 Vict. c. 98)
- Electors of Knights of the Shires Act 1429, or the Forty Shilling Freeholder Act 1430 c. 7 What Sort of Men shall be Choosers, and who shall be chosen Knights of the Parliament. — repealed for Ireland by Statute Law (Ireland) Revision Act 1872 (35 & 36 Vict. c. 98) and for England and Wales by Parliamentary Elections (No. 2) Act 1774 (14 Geo. 3. c. 58), Ballot Act 1872 (35 & 36 Vict. c. 33) and Representation of the People Act 1918 (7 & 8 Geo. 5. c. 64)
- (Labourers) c. 8 The statute of 6 Hen. VI. c. 3. (Note: 6 Hen. 6. c. 3) confirmed, touching the wages of labourers, servants, artificers, and workmen. — repealed for England and Wales by Statute Law Revision Act 1863 (26 & 27 Vict. c. 125) and for Ireland by Statute Law (Ireland) Revision Act 1872 (35 & 36 Vict. c. 98)
- Forcible Entry Act 1429 c. 9 The duty of justices of the peace where land is entered upon or detained with force. — repealed by Criminal Law Act 1977 (c. 45)
- (Malicious Indictments, etc.) c. 10 Process awarded against those which dwelling in foreign counties be indicted or appealed. — repealed by Administration of Justice (Miscellaneous Provisions) Act 1938 (1 & 2 Geo. 6. c. 63)
- (Apprenticeship) c. 11 The citizens of London may take apprentices according to their ancient customs. — repealed for England and Wales by Statute Law Revision Act 1863 (26 & 27 Vict. c. 125) and for Ireland by Statute Law (Ireland) Revision Act 1872 (35 & 36 Vict. c. 98)
- Amendment Act 1429 c. 12 No Judgement or Record shall be reversed for any Writ, Process, &c. rased. What Defects in Records may be amended by the Judges, and what not. — repealed for England and Wales by Statute Law Revision and Civil Procedure Act 1883 (46 & 47 Vict. c. 49) and for Northern Ireland by Statute Law Revision Act 1950 (14 Geo. 6. c. 6)
- (Protections) c. 13 There shall not be excepted in the protections of those that shall go with the King into France, assise of Novel Disseisin. — repealed for England and Wales by Statute Law Revision Act 1863 (26 & 27 Vict. c. 125) and for Ireland by Statute Law (Ireland) Revision Act 1872 (35 & 36 Vict. c. 98)
- (Murders, etc.) c. 14 Riotous persons committing of felonies, and then fleeing into secret places. — repealed for England and Wales by Statute Law Revision Act 1863 (26 & 27 Vict. c. 125) and for Ireland by Statute Law (Ireland) Revision Act 1872 (35 & 36 Vict. c. 98)
- Amendment (No. 2) Act 1429 c. 15 The justices may in certain cases amend defaults in records. — repealed for England and Wales by Statute Law Revision and Civil Procedure Act 1883 (46 & 47 Vict. c. 49) and for Northern Ireland by Statute Law Revision Act 1950 (14 Geo. 6. c. 6)
- Inquests by Escheators, etc. Act 1429 c. 16 By what persons escheators shall find an office, and in what time he shall certify it. A patent made of lands seised upon an inquest. — repealed by the Escheat (Procedure) Act 1887 (50 & 51 Vict. c. 53)
- (The staple) c. 17 Wools, fells, &c. shipped out of England, Wales, or Ireland, for any place but Calais, shall be forfeited by the double, except by merchants of Genoa, Venice, &c. — repealed by Repeal of Acts Concerning Importation Act 1822 (3 Geo. 4. c. 41)
- (The staple) c. 18 Certain ordinances made for the prices of merchandises, and maintenance of the town and mint at Calais. — repealed by Repeal of Acts Concerning Importation Act 1822 (3 Geo. 4. c. 41)
- (Exportation) c. 19 If a mariner shall receive into his ship any merchandises, or carry them to any other place than to the staple at Calais, the goods and ship shall be forfeited. — repealed by Repeal of Acts Concerning Importation Act 1822 (3 Geo. 4. c. 41)
- Trade with Calais Act 1429 c. 20 No merchants of Calais shall buy beyond the sea any merchandise of the staple. — repealed by Repeal of Acts Concerning Importation Act 1822 (3 Geo. 4. c. 41)
- (Exportation) c. 21 A repeal of all licences granted to men of Newcastle and Berwick, to carry merchandises to other places than to Calais. The penalty for carrying of merchandises of the staple into Scotland. — repealed by Repeal of Acts Concerning Importation Act 1822 (3 Geo. 4. c. 41)
- (Wool) c. 22 What is requisite to be done in winding and packing of wool. None shall force, clack, or beard any wool. — repealed by Repeal of Obsolete Statutes Act 1856 (19 & 20 Vict. c. 64)
- (Exportation) No thrums of woolen yarn shall be carried out of the realm. c. 23 — repealed by Repeal of Acts Concerning Importation Act 1822 (3 Geo. 4. c. 41)
- Trade with Aliens Act 1429 c. 24 None shall pay merchants aliens in gold, but in silver, Merchandise shall not be sold to an alien but for present payment. — repealed by Repeal of Acts Concerning Importation Act 1822 (3 Geo. 4. c. 41)
- (Staple) c. 25 The mayor of the staple of Calais shall continue two years in his office. — repealed for England and Wales by Statute Law Revision Act 1863 (26 & 27 Vict. c. 125) and for Ireland by Statute Law (Ireland) Revision Act 1872 (35 & 36 Vict. c. 98)
- Franchises Act 1429 c. 26 The penalty if in any action the defendant make default to put the lords, mayors, &c. from their jurisdiction. — repealed for England and Wales by Statute Law Revision Act 1863 (26 & 27 Vict. c. 125) and for Ireland by Statute Law (Ireland) Revision Act 1872 (35 & 36 Vict. c. 98)
- (Robberies on the Severn) c. 27 A remedy for the inhabitants of Tewksbury in the county of Gloucester, against the commonality of the forest of Dean, &c. to prevent future robberies and injuries in the navigation on the Severn. — repealed for England and Wales by Statute Law Revision Act 1863 (26 & 27 Vict. c. 125) and for Ireland by Statute Law (Ireland) Revision Act 1872 (35 & 36 Vict. c. 98)
- (Ruffhead c. 28) (Note: "There is no c. 28 in the Statutes of the Realm; see note there, vol. 2 p. 261") (Note: "In the Old Printed Translations of the Statutes a Chapter is inserted, numbered XXVIII, respecting the Roads and Bridges at Burford and Culhamford in Oxfordshire; No such Chapter is inserted in the Old Printed French Copies; It appears to be in Effect the same as Chapter XI of the Statute 9 Hen. V. Stat. 2 which see, and the Note there.") There shall be a bridge made over the water of Burford, and another over the water of Culhamford, in the county of Oxford.
- (Inquests) c. 29 An inquest shall be De medietate lingæu, where an alien is party.— repealed for England and Wales by Statute Law Revision Act 1863 (26 & 27 Vict. c. 125) and for Ireland by Statute Law (Ireland) Revision Act 1872 (35 & 36 Vict. c. 98)

=== Sources ===
- Chronological Table of and Index to the Statutes. Vol. 1: To the End of the Session 59 Vict. Sess. 2 (1895) (13th ed.). London: Her Majesty's Stationery Office. 1896. p. 36 – via Google Books.
- Chronological Table of the Statutes: Covering the Period from 1235 to the End of 1971. London: Her Majesty's Stationery Office. 1972. p. 31. ISBN 978-0-11-840096-1 – via Google Books.

== 1430 (9 Hen. 6) ==
The 7th Parliament of King Henry VI, which met at Westminster from 12 January 1431 until 20 March 1431.

This session was also traditionally cited as 9 H. 6.

- (Adjournment of Assizes) c. 1 All assises and Nisi prius shall be adjourned during this parliament, until certain days. — repealed for England and Wales by Statute Law Revision Act 1863 (26 & 27 Vict. c. 125) and for Ireland by Statute Law (Ireland) Revision Act 1872 (35 & 36 Vict. c. 98)
- (Trade with Aliens) c. 2 English merchants may sell their merchandise to aliens, giving them only six months credit, notwithstanding the statute of 8 Hen. 6. c. 24. (Note: Trade with Aliens Act 1429 (8 Hen. 6. c. 24)) — repealed by Repeal of Acts Concerning Importation Act 1822 (3 Geo. 4. c. 41)
- (Proceedings against Owen Glendour made valid (saving for his heirs)) c. 3 — repealed by Statute Law Revision Act 1948 (11 & 12 Geo. 6. c. 62)
- (Indemptitate nominis by Executors) c. 4 An indentitate nominis maintainable by executors, &c. — repealed by Civil Procedure Acts Repeal Act 1879 (42 & 43 Vict. c. 59)
- (Free Passage on the Severn) c. 5 All men shall have free passage in Severn with goods, chattels, &c. — repealed by Statute Law Revision Act 1948 (11 & 12 Geo. 6. c. 62)
- (Weights (Dorchester)) c. 6 The burgesses of Dorchester shall have their weighing by twelve miles about, &c. — repealed by Weights and Measures Act 1824 (5 Geo. 4. c. 74)
- Sheriff of Herefordshire Act 1430 c. 7 No sheriff, &c. of the county of Hereford shall extort money, or do wrong in his turn, by colour of his office. — repealed for England and Wales by Statute Law Revision Act 1863 (26 & 27 Vict. c. 125) and for Ireland by Statute Law (Ireland) Revision Act 1872 (35 & 36 Vict. c. 98)
- (Weight of a Wey of Cheese) c. 8 The weight of a wey of cheese. — repealed by Weights and Measures Act 1824 (5 Geo. 4. c. 74)
- River Lee Navigation Act 1430 or River Lee (Conservancy Commission) Act 1430 c. 9 The chancellor of England may grant his commission to certain persons to scour, and amend the river Ley in the counties of Essex, Hertford, and Middlesex. — repealed by Statute Law Revision Act 1948 (11 & 12 Geo. 6. c. 62)
- (Attorneys) c. 10 A rehearsal and confirmation of the statute of 3 Hen. V. cap. 2. (Note: 3 Hen. 5. c. 2) authorizing certain abbots and other religious persons to make their attornies. — repealed for England and Wales by Statute Law Revision Act 1863 (26 & 27 Vict. c. 125) and for Ireland by Statute Law (Ireland) Revision Act 1872 (35 & 36 Vict. c. 98)
- (Bastardy) c. 11 Proclamations before a writ be awarded to the bishop to certify bastardy. — repealed for England and Wales by Statute Law Revision Act 1863 (26 & 27 Vict. c. 125) and for Ireland by Statute Law (Ireland) Revision Act 1872 (35 & 36 Vict. c. 98)
- (Northampton, highways and streets) Rot. Parl. vol. iv p. 373 (Note: This act is not listed in the Chronological Table of the Statutes.) An Act for Paving and Repairing certain Highways and Streets within the Town of Northampton. — repealed by Northampton Act 1988 (c. xxix)

=== Sources ===
- Chronological Table of and Index to the Statutes. Vol. 1: To the End of the Session 59 Vict. Sess. 2 (1895) (13th ed.). London: Her Majesty's Stationery Office. 1896. pp. 36–37 – via Google Books.
- Chronological Table of the Statutes: Covering the Period from 1235 to the End of 1971. London: Her Majesty's Stationery Office. 1972. pp. 31–32. ISBN 978-0-11-840096-1 – via Google Books.

== 1432 (10 Hen. 6) ==
The 8th Parliament of King Henry VI, which met at Westminster from 12 May 1432 until 17 July 1432.

This session was also traditionally cited as 10 H. 6.

- (Staple) c. 1 Recognisances taken before the mayor, &c. of Calais, shall be effectual in England. — repealed by Repeal of Acts Concerning Importation Act 1822 (3 Geo. 4. c. 41)
- Electors of Knights of the Shire Act 1432 c. 2 Certain things required in him who shall be a chooser of the knights of the parliament. — repealed for Ireland by Statute Law (Ireland) Revision Act 1872 (35 & 36 Vict. c. 98) and for England and Wales by Parliamentary Elections (No. 2) Act 1774 (14 Geo. 3. c. 58), Ballot Act 1872 (35 & 36 Vict. c. 33) and Representation of the People Act 1918 (7 & 8 Geo. 5. c. 64)
- (Letters of Request) c. 3 A letter of request shall be granted by the keeper of the privy seal to any of the King's subjects, from whom goods shall be taken by the subjects of Denmark. — repealed for England and Wales by Statute Law Revision Act 1863 (26 & 27 Vict. c. 125) and for Ireland by Statute Law (Ireland) Revision Act 1872 (35 & 36 Vict. c. 98)
- (Appearance of Plaintiffs) c. 4 The penalty of him that maketh a false entry, that the plaintiff doth offer himself in person, where his doth not. — repealed for England and Wales by Statute Law Revision Act 1863 (26 & 27 Vict. c. 125) and for Ireland by Statute Law (Ireland) Revision Act 1872 (35 & 36 Vict. c. 98)
- (Calais Beacons, etc.) c. 5 A rehearsal of the statute of 21 R. II. c. 18. (Note: 21 Ric. 2. c. 18) touching the maintenance of certain places about Calais. — repealed for England and Wales by Statute Law Revision Act 1863 (26 & 27 Vict. c. 125) and for Ireland by Statute Law (Ireland) Revision Act 1872 (35 & 36 Vict. c. 98)
- (8 Hen. 6. c. 10 (indictments) confirmed) c. 6 What process shall be awarded upon an indictment removed into the King's bench. — repealed by Administration of Justice (Miscellaneous Provisions) Act 1938 (1 & 2 Geo. 6. c. 63)
- (Exportation) c. 7 All wools and woolfells that shall be carried to any other place than to Calais, shall be forfeited to the King and the finder. — repealed by Repeal of Acts Concerning Importation Act 1822 (3 Geo. 4. c. 41)

=== 10 Hen. 6. Stat. 2 ===
This session was also traditionally cited as 10 Hen. 6. St. 2, 10 Hen. 6. st. 2, 10 H. 6. Stat. 2, 10 H. 6. St. 2, 10 H. 6. st. 2.

- (Payment of Judges, etc.) 10 Hen. 6. Stat. 2 — repealed for England and Wales by Statute Law Revision Act 1863 (26 & 27 Vict. c. 125) and for Ireland by Statute Law (Ireland) Revision Act 1872 (35 & 36 Vict. c. 98)

=== Sources ===
- Chronological Table of and Index to the Statutes. Vol. 1: To the End of the Session 59 Vict. Sess. 2 (1895) (13th ed.). London: Her Majesty's Stationery Office. 1896. p. 37 – via Google Books.
- Chronological Table of the Statutes: Covering the Period from 1235 to the End of 1971. London: Her Majesty's Stationery Office. 1972. p. 32. ISBN 978-0-11-840096-1 – via Google Books.

== 1433 (11 Hen. 6) ==
The 9th Parliament of King Henry VI, which met at Westminster from 8 July 1433.

This session was also traditionally cited as 11 H. 6.

- Stews in Southwark Act 1433 c. 1 They that dwell at the Stews in Southwark shall not be impanelled in Juries, nor keep any Inn or Tavern but there. — repealed by Repeal of Obsolete Statutes Act 1856 (19 & 20 Vict. c. 64)
- (Real Actions) c. 2 The penalty where a sheriff is named a dissesor in a assise. — repealed for England and Wales by Statute Law Revision Act 1863 (26 & 27 Vict. c. 125) and for Ireland by Statute Law (Ireland) Revision Act 1872 (35 & 36 Vict. c. 98)
- (Real Actions) c. 3 An assise, &c. maintainable against the pernor of the profits. — repealed for England and Wales by Statute Law Revision Act 1863 (26 & 27 Vict. c. 125) and for Ireland by Statute Law (Ireland) Revision Act 1872 (35 & 36 Vict. c. 98)
- (Attaints) c. 4 The plaintiffs in attaint shall recover their costs and damages. — repealed for England and Wales by Statute Law Revision Act 1863 (26 & 27 Vict. c. 125) and for Ireland by Statute Law (Ireland) Revision Act 1872 (35 & 36 Vict. c. 98)
- (Real Actions) c. 5 The remedy where a tenant granteth over his estate, taketh the profits, and committeth waste. — repealed for England and Wales by Statute Law Revision Act 1863 (26 & 27 Vict. c. 125) and for Ireland by Statute Law (Ireland) Revision Act 1872 (35 & 36 Vict. c. 98)
- (Continuance of Indictments) c. 6 No suit pending before any justices, &c. shall be discontinued by a new commission. — repealed by Justices of the Peace Act 1968 (c. 69)
- (Sheriff of Herefordshire) c. 7 The statute of 9 H. VI. c. 7. (Note: 9 Hen. 6. c. 7) which restrainth the sheriff of the county of Hereford to take money by extortion, &c. revived for three years. — repealed for England and Wales by Statute Law Revision Act 1863 (26 & 27 Vict. c. 125) and for Ireland by Statute Law (Ireland) Revision Act 1872 (35 & 36 Vict. c. 98)
- Weights and Measures Act 1433 c. 8 A confirmation of all statutes made touching weights and measures. — repealed for England and Wales by Statute Law Revision Act 1863 (26 & 27 Vict. c. 125) and for Ireland by Statute Law (Ireland) Revision Act 1872 (35 & 36 Vict. c. 98)
- (Cloths) c. 9 Of what length and breadth cloths called Streits shall be. — repealed for England and Wales by Woollen Manufacture Act 1809 (49 Geo. 3. c. 109) and for Ireland by Statute Law (Ireland) Revision Act 1872 (35 & 36 Vict. c. 98)
- (Staple) c. 10 He shall find sureties, &c. that sueth to defeat an execution upon a statute. — repealed for England and Wales by Statute Law Revision Act 1863 (26 & 27 Vict. c. 125) and for Ireland by Statute Law (Ireland) Revision Act 1872 (35 & 36 Vict. c. 98)
- Parliament Act 1433 c. 11 The punishment of those that make assault upon any that come to the parliament. — repealed for England and Wales by Offences Against the Person Act 1828 (9 Geo. 4. c. 31), for Ireland by Offences Against the Person (Ireland) Act 1829 (10 Geo. 4. c. 34) and for India by Criminal Law (India) Act 1828 (9 Geo. 4. c. 74)
- (Wax Chandlers) c. 12 What wax-chandlers shall take for their work of wax. — repealed for England and Wales by Continuance, etc. of Laws Act 1623 (21 Jas. 1. c. 28) and for Ireland by Statute Law (Ireland) Revision Act 1872 (35 & 36 Vict. c. 98)
- (Staple) c. 13 A confirmation for three years of the stat. of 8 Hen. VI. c. 18. (Note: 8 Hen. 6. c. 18) that wool, &c. brought to Calais shall be sold for ready money. — repealed by Repeal of Acts Concerning Importation Act 1822 (3 Geo. 4. c. 41)
- (Exportation) c. 14 It shall be felony to ship or carry any merchandises of the staple in creeks, during three years. — repealed by Repeal of Acts Concerning Importation Act 1822 (3 Geo. 4. c. 41)
- (Customs) c. 15 A customer shall discharge the merchant that hath paid his custom. — repealed for England and Wales by Statute Law Revision Act 1863 (26 & 27 Vict. c. 125) and for Ireland by Statute Law (Ireland) Revision Act 1872 (35 & 36 Vict. c. 98)
- (Customs) c. 16 The penalty for sealing of a blank cocket to deceive the King of his customs. — repealed for England and Wales by Statute Law Revision Act 1863 (26 & 27 Vict. c. 125) and for Ireland by Statute Law (Ireland) Revision Act 1872 (35 & 36 Vict. c. 98)

=== Sources ===
- Chronological Table of and Index to the Statutes. Vol. 1: To the End of the Session 59 Vict. Sess. 2 (1895) (13th ed.). London: Her Majesty's Stationery Office. 1896. p. 37 – via Google Books.
- Chronological Table of the Statutes: Covering the Period from 1235 to the End of 1971. London: Her Majesty's Stationery Office. 1972. p. 32. ISBN 978-0-11-840096-1 – via Google Books.

== 1435 (14 Hen. 6) ==
The 10th Parliament of King Henry VI, which met at Westminster from 10 October 1435 until 23 December 1435.

This session was also traditionally cited as 14 H. 6.

- (Judgment in Treason and Felony) c. 1 Justices of Nisi prius may give judgement of a man attainted or acquitted of felony. — repealed for England and Wales by Supreme Court of Judicature (Consolidation) Act 1925 (15 & 16 Geo. 5. c. 49) and for Northern Ireland by Statute Law Revision Act 1950 (14 Geo. 6. c. 6)
- (Staple) c. 2 Wools and fells shall not be exported but to Calais. Special exceptions in favour of the King, and his council, and the merchants of Venice, Genoa, &c. — repealed by Repeal of Acts Concerning Importation Act 1822 (3 Geo. 4. c. 41)
- (Cumberland Assizes) c. 3 Where the justices of assise of Cumberland shall hold their sessions. — repealed by Statute Law Revision Act 1948 (11 & 12 Geo. 6. c. 62)
- (Middlesex Sessions) c. 4 The justices of the peace of Middlesex may keep their sessions but twice in the year. — repealed for England and Wales by Statute Law Revision Act 1863 (26 & 27 Vict. c. 125) and for Ireland by Statute Law (Ireland) Revision Act 1872 (35 & 36 Vict. c. 98)
- (Exportation) c. 5 Merchandises of the staple shipped in creeks shall be forfeited to the King, &c. — repealed by Repeal of Acts Concerning Importation Act 1822 (3 Geo. 4. c. 41)
- (Alien Merchants) c. 6 None shall disturb an alien that bringeth in victuals to sell in gross, or by retail. — repealed by Repeal of Acts Concerning Importation Act 1822 (3 Geo. 4. c. 41)
- Alien Goods Act 1435 c. 7 Merchandises taken in Ships of the King's Enemies, though belonging to Foreigners in Amity with the King, shall not be restored. — repealed by Repeal of Acts Concerning Importation Act 1822 (3 Geo. 4. c. 41)
- Safe Conducts Act 1435 c. 8 The statute of 2. Hen. V. stat. 1. cap. 6. (Note: Safe Conducts Act 1414 (2 Hen. 5. Stat. 1. c. 6)) touching breakers of truce, suspended. — repealed for England and Wales by Statute Law Revision Act 1863 (26 & 27 Vict. c. 125) and for Ireland by Statute Law (Ireland) Revision Act 1872 (35 & 36 Vict. c. 98)

=== Sources ===
- Chronological Table of and Index to the Statutes. Vol. 1: To the End of the Session 59 Vict. Sess. 2 (1895) (13th ed.). London: Her Majesty's Stationery Office. 1896. p. 37 – via Google Books.
- Chronological Table of the Statutes: Covering the Period from 1235 to the End of 1971. London: Her Majesty's Stationery Office. 1972. p. 32. ISBN 978-0-11-840096-1 – via Google Books.

== 1436 (15 Hen. 6) ==
The 11th Parliament of King Henry VI, which met at Westminster from 21 January 1437 until 27 March 1437.

This session was also traditionally cited as 15 H. 6.

- Marshalsea Act 1436 c. 1 Where a suit before the marshal, the defendant may plead, that the plaintiff or he are not of the King's house. — repealed for England and Wales by Statute Law Revision Act 1863 (26 & 27 Vict. c. 125) and for Ireland by Statute Law (Ireland) Revision Act 1872 (35 & 36 Vict. c. 98)
- (Exportation of Corn) c. 2 Corn being of small price, viz. wheat at six shillings and eight-pence, and barley at three shillings the quarter, may be carried forth of the realm without licence. — repealed for England and Wales by Statute Law Revision Act 1863 (26 & 27 Vict. c. 125) and for Ireland by Statute Law (Ireland) Revision Act 1872 (35 & 36 Vict. c. 98)
- Safe Conducts Act 1436 c. 3 What things be requiste to make a safe conduct effectual. — repealed for England and Wales by Statute Law Revision Act 1863 (26 & 27 Vict. c. 125) and for Ireland by Statute Law (Ireland) Revision Act 1872 (35 & 36 Vict. c. 98)
- (Sub-poenas) c. 4 None shall sue a Subpœna until he find surety to satisfy the defendant his damages, if he do not verify his bill. — repealed for England and Wales by Statute Law Revision Act 1863 (26 & 27 Vict. c. 125) and for Ireland by Statute Law (Ireland) Revision Act 1872 (35 & 36 Vict. c. 98)
- (Attaints) c. 5 What sort of persons may be impanelled upon an attaint. — repealed for England and Wales by Statute Law Revision Act 1863 (26 & 27 Vict. c. 125) and for Ireland by Statute Law (Ireland) Revision Act 1872 (35 & 36 Vict. c. 98)
- Guilds and Fraternities Act 1436 c. 6 A restraint of unlawful orders made by masters of guilds, fraternities, and other companies. — repealed for England and Wales by Statute Law Revision Act 1863 (26 & 27 Vict. c. 125) and for Ireland by Statute Law (Ireland) Revision Act 1872 (35 & 36 Vict. c. 98)
- (Attorneys) c. 7 All persons religious and secular may make their general attornies to sue or plead for them in every hundred and wapentake. — repealed for England and Wales by Statute Law Revision Act 1863 (26 & 27 Vict. c. 125) and for Ireland by Statute Law (Ireland) Revision Act 1872 (35 & 36 Vict. c. 98)
- c. 8 No merchant shall ship any merchandises of the staple, but as wharfs assigned, &c. — repealed by Repeal of Acts Concerning Importation Act 1822 (3 Geo. 4. c. 41)

=== Sources ===
- Chronological Table of and Index to the Statutes. Vol. 1: To the End of the Session 59 Vict. Sess. 2 (1895) (13th ed.). London: Her Majesty's Stationery Office. 1896. p. 37 – via Google Books.
- Chronological Table of the Statutes: Covering the Period from 1235 to the End of 1971. London: Her Majesty's Stationery Office. 1972. p. 32. ISBN 978-0-11-840096-1 – via Google Books.

== 1439 (18 Hen. 6) ==
The 12th Parliament of King Henry VI, which met at Westminster from 12 November 1439.

This session was also traditionally cited as 18 H. 6.

- Dating of Letters Patent Act 1439 c. 1 Letters patents shall bear the date of the King's warrant delivered into the chancery. — repealed by Statute Law (Repeals) Act 1969 (c. 52)
- (Attaints) c. 2 They which have gavelkind lands to the yearly value of twenty pounds, may be returned in attaints. — repealed for England and Wales by Statute Law Revision Act 1863 (26 & 27 Vict. c. 125) and for Ireland by Statute Law (Ireland) Revision Act 1872 (35 & 36 Vict. c. 98)
- (Exportation) c. 3 Butter and cheese may be transported without licence. — repealed by Repeal of Acts Concerning Importation Act 1822 (3 Geo. 4. c. 41)
- Alien Merchants Act 1439 c. 4 No Merchant Alien shall sell any Merchandises in England to another Merchant Alien. Mayors, &c. of Cities and Towns to execute this Act. — repealed by Repeal of Acts Concerning Importation Act 1822 (3 Geo. 4. c. 41)
- (Taxation) c. 5 None appointed to be a collector of a fifteen in a city, shall be also collector in the same county, except he hath lands, &c. — repealed for England and Wales by Statute Law Revision Act 1863 (26 & 27 Vict. c. 125) and for Ireland by Statute Law (Ireland) Revision Act 1872 (35 & 36 Vict. c. 98)
- Crown Grants Act 1439 c. 6 No Lands shall be granted by Letters Patents, until the King's Title be found by Inquisition. — repealed by Escheat (Procedure) Act 1887 (50 & 51 Vict. c. 53)
- (Penalty on Escheators) c. 7 In what time an escheator shall return an office found before him. — repealed by Escheat (Procedure) Act 1887 (50 & 51 Vict. c. 53)
- (Captures at Sea) c. 8 What things be requisite to make the King's safe conduct good. — repealed for England and Wales by Statute Law Revision Act 1863 (26 & 27 Vict. c. 125) and for Ireland by Statute Law (Ireland) Revision Act 1872 (35 & 36 Vict. c. 98)
- (Appearance of Plaintiffs) c. 9 The warrant of attorney shall be recorded in the same term that the exigent is awarded. — repealed for England and Wales by Solicitors Act 1843 (6 & 7 Vict. c. 73) and for Ireland by Statute Law (Ireland) Revision Act 1872 (35 & 36 Vict. c. 98)
- (Commissions of Sewers) c. 10 Commissions of sewers shall be awarded where need shall require, during ten years. — repealed for England and Wales by Statute Law Revision Act 1863 (26 & 27 Vict. c. 125) and for Ireland by Statute Law (Ireland) Revision Act 1872 (35 & 36 Vict. c. 98)
- (Justices of the Peace) c. 11 Of what yearly value in lands a justice of peace ought to be. — repealed for England and Wales by Statute Law Revision Act 1863 (26 & 27 Vict. c. 125) and for Ireland by Statute Law (Ireland) Revision Act 1872 (35 & 36 Vict. c. 98)
- (Indictments, etc.) c. 12 Appeals or indictments of felony committed, in a place where there is none such. — repealed for England and Wales by Criminal Law Act 1826 (7 Geo. 4. c. 64) and for Ireland by Statute Law (Ireland) Revision Act 1872 (35 & 36 Vict. c. 98)
- Outlawries Act 1439 c. 13 A confirmation of the statute of 9 Hen. V. c. 2. (Note: Outlawries Act 1421 (9 Hen. 5. Stat. 1. c. 2)) concerning forfeitures on outlawries in the county of Lancaster. — repealed for England and Wales by Statute Law Revision Act 1863 (26 & 27 Vict. c. 125) and for Ireland by Statute Law (Ireland) Revision Act 1872 (35 & 36 Vict. c. 98)
- (Sheriffs) c. 14 It shall be felony to carry wool or woolfels to any other place than to Calais, saving such which pass the streights of Marrock. — repealed for England and Wales by Statute Law Revision Act 1863 (26 & 27 Vict. c. 125) and for Ireland by Statute Law (Ireland) Revision Act 1872 (35 & 36 Vict. c. 98)
- (Exportation) c. 15 The penalty of taking bribe in the arraying of a jury. — repealed by Repeal of Acts Concerning Importation Act 1822 (3 Geo. 4. c. 41)
- Cloth Measures Act 1439 c. 16 There shall be but one measure of cloth throughout the realm by the yard and the inch, and not by the yard and the handful, according to the London measure. — repealed for England and Wales by Statute Law Revision Act 1863 (26 & 27 Vict. c. 125) and for Ireland by Statute Law (Ireland) Revision Act 1872 (35 & 36 Vict. c. 98)
- Vessels of Wine, etc. Act 1439 c. 17 Vessels of wine, oil, and honey, shall be gauged. — repealed by Repeal of Acts Concerning Importation Act 1822 (3 Geo. 4. c. 41) and Weights and Measures Act 1824 (5 Geo. 4. c. 74)
- Soldiers Act 1439 c. 18 How much a captain shall forfeit that doth detain any part of his soldiers wages. — repealed by Repeal of Obsolete Statutes Act 1856 (19 & 20 Vict. c. 64)
- (Soldiers) c. 19 The penalty of a soldier not going with, or departing from, his captain without licence. — repealed for England and Wales by Statute Law Revision Act 1863 (26 & 27 Vict. c. 125) and for Ireland by Statute Law (Ireland) Revision Act 1872 (35 & 36 Vict. c. 98)

=== Sources ===
- Chronological Table of and Index to the Statutes. Vol. 1: To the End of the Session 59 Vict. Sess. 2 (1895) (13th ed.). London: Her Majesty's Stationery Office. 1896. pp. 37–38 – via Google Books.
- Chronological Table of the Statutes: Covering the Period from 1235 to the End of 1971. London: Her Majesty's Stationery Office. 1972. pp. 32–33. ISBN 978-0-11-840096-1 – via Google Books.

== 1442 (20 Hen. 6) ==
The 13th Parliament of King Henry VI, which met at Westminster from 25 January 1442 until 27 March 1442.

This session was also traditionally cited as 20 H. 6.

- Safe Conducts Act 1442 c. 1 All letters of safe conduct shall be inrolled in the chancery. — repealed for England and Wales by Statute Law Revision Act 1863 (26 & 27 Vict. c. 125) and for Ireland by Statute Law (Ireland) Revision Act 1872 (35 & 36 Vict. c. 98)
- Outlawries Act 1442 c. 2 No person outlawed within the county of Lancaster shall forfeit any goods or lands but those which he hath in the same county. — repealed for England and Wales by Statute Law Revision Act 1863 (26 & 27 Vict. c. 125) and for Ireland by Statute Law (Ireland) Revision Act 1872 (35 & 36 Vict. c. 98)
- Treason Act 1442 c. 3 It shall be high treason for Welshmen to take and carry away Englishmen or their goods into Wales, or there to withhold them. — repealed for England and Wales by Statute Law Revision Act 1863 (26 & 27 Vict. c. 125) and for Ireland by Statute Law (Ireland) Revision Act 1872 (35 & 36 Vict. c. 98)
- c. 4 What duties they shall pay to the King which carry wools to any other place than to the staples. — repealed for England and Wales by Statute Law Revision Act 1863 (26 & 27 Vict. c. 125) and for Ireland by Statute Law (Ireland) Revision Act 1872 (35 & 36 Vict. c. 98)
- c. 5 No customer, &c. shall have a ship of his own, use merchandise, keep a wharf or inn, or be a factor. — repealed by Repeal of Acts Concerning Importation Act 1822 (3 Geo. 4. c. 41)
- c. 6 A confirmation for ten years of the statute of 15 Hen. VI. cap. 2. (Note: 15 Hen. 6. c. 2) touching the transportation of corn being of certain prices. — repealed for England and Wales by Statute Law Revision Act 1863 (26 & 27 Vict. c. 125) and for Ireland by Statute Law (Ireland) Revision Act 1872 (35 & 36 Vict. c. 98)
- c. 7 If any carry merchandises into Wales, and after bring them into England not customed, he shall forfeit them. — repealed for England and Wales by Statute Law Revision Act 1863 (26 & 27 Vict. c. 125) and for Ireland by Statute Law (Ireland) Revision Act 1872 (35 & 36 Vict. c. 98)
- c. 8 In what case the King's purveyors that would take cattle, may be resisted. — repealed for England and Wales by Statute Law Revision Act 1863 (26 & 27 Vict. c. 125) and for Ireland by Statute Law (Ireland) Revision Act 1872 (35 & 36 Vict. c. 98)
- Peeresses Act 1441 c. 9 The order of trial of countesses, &c. being indicted of treason, &c. — repealed by Criminal Justice Act 1948 (11 & 12 Geo. 6. c. 58)
- c. 10 Four wardens of the worsted weavers of Norwich appointed yearly to inspect and regulate the worsted of that city, and two in Norfolk. The length and breadth of all sorts of worsteds made in Norwich and Norfolk assigned. — repealed for England and Wales by Statute Law Revision Act 1863 (26 & 27 Vict. c. 125) and for Ireland by Statute Law (Ireland) Revision Act 1872 (35 & 36 Vict. c. 98)
- c. 11 A repeal of so much of the statute of 2 Hen. V. stat. 1. cap. 6. (Note: Safe Conducts Act 1414 (2 Hen. 5. Stat. 1. c. 6)) as maketh the breaking of truce and safe conducts high treason. — repealed for England and Wales by Statute Law Revision Act 1863 (26 & 27 Vict. c. 125) and for Ireland by Statute Law (Ireland) Revision Act 1872 (35 & 36 Vict. c. 98)
- c. 12 A reformation of the partition money arising by the sale of wools and woolfels by the mayor and constable of Calais, ordered for seven years. — repealed for England and Wales by Statute Law Revision Act 1863 (26 & 27 Vict. c. 125) and for Ireland by Statute Law (Ireland) Revision Act 1872 (35 & 36 Vict. c. 98)

=== Sources ===
- Chronological Table of and Index to the Statutes. Vol. 1: To the End of the Session 59 Vict. Sess. 2 (1895) (13th ed.). London: Her Majesty's Stationery Office. 1896. p. 38 – via Google Books.
- Chronological Table of the Statutes: Covering the Period from 1235 to the End of 1971. London: Her Majesty's Stationery Office. 1972. p. 33. ISBN 978-0-11-840096-1 – via Google Books.

== 1444 (23 Hen. 6) ==
The 14th Parliament of King Henry VI, which met at Westminster from 25 February 1445 until 9 April 1445.

This session was also traditionally cited as 23 H. 6.

- (Purveyance) c. 1 In what case the King's purveyors, who are by the last precedent chapter to be termed buyers, may be resisted. — repealed for England and Wales by Statute Law Revision Act 1863 (26 & 27 Vict. c. 125) and for Ireland by Statute Law (Ireland) Revision Act 1872 (35 & 36 Vict. c. 98)
- (Exportation) c. 2 Whoever shall pack or ship thrums or threads to pass beyond the seas, during the three years next coming, shall forfeit the same, or the value. — repealed by Repeal of Acts Concerning Importation Act 1822 (3 Geo. 4. c. 41)
- (Worsteds) c. 3 Four wardens of worsted weavers shall be chosen yearly during the three years next coming, within the city of Norwich, and other four within the county of Norfolk, which shall set down orders for the true making of worsteds within Norwich and Norfolk, and Suffolk. — repealed for England and Wales by Statute Law Revision Act 1863 (26 & 27 Vict. c. 125) and for Ireland by Statute Law (Ireland) Revision Act 1872 (35 & 36 Vict. c. 98)
- (Welshmen) c. 4 Welshmen indicted of treason or felony, that do repair into Herefordshire, shall be apprehended and imprisoned, or else pursued by hue and cry, and a forfeiture of those which do not pursue them. — repealed by Repeal of Obsolete Statutes Act 1856 (19 & 20 Vict. c. 64)
- (Exportation) c. 5 A rehearsal of the statute of 15 Hen. 6. c. 2. (Note: 15 Hen. 6. c. 2) touching licence to transport corn, when wheat doth not exceed vi. s. viii. d. the quarter, and barley iii. s. iv. d. and the same statute made perpetual. — repealed for England and Wales by Statute Law Revision Act 1863 (26 & 27 Vict. c. 125) and for Ireland by Statute Law (Ireland) Revision Act 1872 (35 & 36 Vict. c. 98)
- (Sheriffs of Northumberland) c. 6 The gathering of head-pence by the sheriff of Northumberland shall cease. — repealed for England and Wales by Statute Law Revision Act 1863 (26 & 27 Vict. c. 125) and for Ireland by Statute Law (Ireland) Revision Act 1872 (35 & 36 Vict. c. 98)
- (Sheriffs (Tenure of Office)) c. 7 No man shall be sheriff, under-sheriff, &c. above a year. — repealed by Sheriffs Act 1887 (50 & 51 Vict. c. 55)
- (Commissions of Sewers) c. 8 The Chancellor of England may grant commissions of sewers during fifteen years. — repealed for England and Wales by Statute Law Revision Act 1863 (26 & 27 Vict. c. 125) and for Ireland by Statute Law (Ireland) Revision Act 1872 (35 & 36 Vict. c. 98)
- Sheriffs and Bailiffs, Fees, etc. Act 1444 c. 9 No Sheriff shall let to farm his County or any Bailiwick. The Sheriffs and Bailiffs Fees and Duties in several Cases. — repealed for England and Wales by Sheriffs Act 1887 (50 & 51 Vict. c. 55) and for Ireland by Statute Law (Ireland) Revision Act 1872 (35 & 36 Vict. c. 98)
- Wages of Knights of the Shire Act 1444 c. 10 The Order of levying the Wages of the Knights of the Parliament. — repealed for England and Wales by Statute Law Revision Act 1863 (26 & 27 Vict. c. 125) and for Ireland by Statute Law (Ireland) Revision Act 1872 (35 & 36 Vict. c. 98)
- (Foreign Pleas) c. 11 The trial shall be made when the tenant or defendant, after an issue joined, pleadeth a foreign plea, where the same writ is brought, and by the jury so returned. — repealed for England and Wales by Statute Law Revision Act 1863 (26 & 27 Vict. c. 125) and for Ireland by Statute Law (Ireland) Revision Act 1872 (35 & 36 Vict. c. 98)
- (Labourers) c. 12 A servant in husbandry purporting to depart from his master must give him half a year's warning, or else shall serve him the year following. The several wages of servants in husbandry, and of labourers, with meat and drink, and without. — repealed for England and Wales by Statute Law Revision Act 1863 (26 & 27 Vict. c. 125) and for Ireland by Statute Law (Ireland) Revision Act 1872 (35 & 36 Vict. c. 98)
- (Purveyance) c. 13 The penalty of a subject's taker, taking any thing without the owner's consent. — repealed for England and Wales by Statute Law Revision Act 1863 (26 & 27 Vict. c. 125) and for Ireland by Statute Law (Ireland) Revision Act 1872 (35 & 36 Vict. c. 98)
- Parliamentary Elections Act 1444 c. 14 Who shall be Knights for the Parliament. The Manner of their Election. The Remedy where one is chosen and another returned. — repealed for England and Wales by Ballot Act 1872 (35 & 36 Vict. c. 33) and for Ireland by Statute Law (Ireland) Revision Act 1872 (35 & 36 Vict. c. 98)
- (Gauge Penny) c. 15 The duty of a gauger, and when he shall have his gauge penny. — repealed by Repeal of Acts Concerning Importation Act 1822 (3 Geo. 4. c. 41)
- (Escheators) c. 16 When and where an escheator shall take his inquest of office, and his fee. — repealed by Escheat (Procedure) Act 1887 (50 & 51 Vict. c. 53)
- (Wines) c. 17 No new impositions shall be laid upon them which buy wines in Gascony or Guyen, by the King's officers in those parts, upon pain of forfeiture of twenty pounds, and treble damages. — repealed for England and Wales by Statute Law Revision Act 1863 (26 & 27 Vict. c. 125) and for Ireland by Statute Law (Ireland) Revision Act 1872 (35 & 36 Vict. c. 98)

=== Sources ===
- Chronological Table of and Index to the Statutes. Vol. 1: To the End of the Session 59 Vict. Sess. 2 (1895) (13th ed.). London: Her Majesty's Stationery Office. 1896. p. 38 – via Google Books.
- Chronological Table of the Statutes: Covering the Period from 1235 to the End of 1971. London: Her Majesty's Stationery Office. 1972. p. 33. ISBN 978-0-11-840096-1 – via Google Books.

== 1447 (25 Hen. 6) ==
The 15th Parliament of King Henry VI, which met at Bury St Edmunds from 10 February 1447 until 3 March 1447.

This session was also traditionally cited as 25 H. 6.

- (Wales) All statutes made against Welshmen confirmed. All grants of markets and fairs to any Welshmen shall be void. The King's villains in North Wales shall be constrained to such labour as their have done before. — repealed in England and Wales by Continuance, etc. of Laws Act 1623 (21 Jas. 1. c. 28) and for Ireland by Statute Law (Ireland) Revision Act 1872 (35 & 36 Vict. c. 98)

=== Sources ===
- Chronological Table of and Index to the Statutes. Vol. 1: To the End of the Session 59 Vict. Sess. 2 (1895) (13th ed.). London: Her Majesty's Stationery Office. 1896. p. 38 – via Google Books.
- Chronological Table of the Statutes: Covering the Period from 1235 to the End of 1971. London: Her Majesty's Stationery Office. 1972. p. 33. ISBN 978-0-11-840096-1 – via Google Books.

== 1448 (27 Hen. 6) ==
The 16th Parliament of King Henry VI, which met at Westminster from 12 February 1449 until 16 July 1449.

This session was also traditionally cited as 27 H. 6.

- (Importation) c. 1 If woolen cloths manufactured in England shall be prohibited in Brabant, Holland, and Zealand, then no merchandise growing or wrought there within the dominion of the duke of Burgoin shall come into England upon pain of forfeiture. — repealed by Repeal of Acts Concerning Importation Act 1822 (3 Geo. 4. c. 41)
- (Exportation) c. 2 No licence shall be available to carry wools, fells, or tin to any place out of the realm, but to Calais. — repealed by Repeal of Acts Concerning Importation Act 1822 (3 Geo. 4. c. 41)
- (Exportation (No. 2)) c. 3 Merchants aliens shall bestow all their money upon other merchandises, and carry forth no gold or silver, upon pain of forfeiture thereof. — repealed by Repeal of Acts Concerning Importation Act 1822 (3 Geo. 4. c. 41)
- Treason Act 1448 c. 4 A rehearsal and confirmation for three years of the statute of 20 Hen. VI. cap. 3. (Note: Treason Act 1442 (20 Hen 6. c. 3)) provided against Welshmen that take any Englishmen, their goods and chattels, and carry them into Wales. — repealed for England and Wales by Statute Law Revision Act 1863 (26 & 27 Vict. c. 125) and for Ireland by Statute Law (Ireland) Revision Act 1872 (35 & 36 Vict. c. 98)
- Sunday Fairs Act 1448 c. 5 Certain days wherein fairs and markets ought not to be kept. — repealed by Statute Law (Repeals) Act 1969 (c. 52)
- c. 6 The King's pardon granted to all priests, as well secular as religious, of several offences, forfeitures, &c. — repealed for England and Wales by Statute Law Revision Act 1863 (26 & 27 Vict. c. 125) and for Ireland by Statute Law (Ireland) Revision Act 1872 (35 & 36 Vict. c. 98)

=== Sources ===
- Chronological Table of and Index to the Statutes. Vol. 1: To the End of the Session 59 Vict. Sess. 2 (1895) (13th ed.). London: Her Majesty's Stationery Office. 1896. p. 38 – via Google Books.
- Chronological Table of the Statutes: Covering the Period from 1235 to the End of 1971. London: Her Majesty's Stationery Office. 1972. p. 33. ISBN 978-0-11-840096-1 – via Google Books.

== 1449 (28 Hen. 6) ==
The 17th Parliament of King Henry VI, which met at Westminster from 6 November 1449.

This session was also traditionally cited as 28 H. 6.

- (Importation) c. 1 A rehearsal and confirmation for seven years of the statute of 27 Hen. VI. cap. 1. (Note: 27 Hen. 6. c. 1) prohibiting the merchandises of Holland, Zealand, and Brabant to be brought into this realm, until English cloth may be sold there. — repealed by Repeal of Acts Concerning Importation Act 1822 (3 Geo. 4. c. 41)
- (Purveyance) c. 2 The penalty for taking any persons horses or cart without the delivery of the owner, or some officer, or for taking money to spare them. — repealed for England and Wales by Statute Law Revision Act 1863 (26 & 27 Vict. c. 125) and for Ireland by Statute Law (Ireland) Revision Act 1872 (35 & 36 Vict. c. 98)
- (Pardon) c. 3 The King's pardon to those that were sheriffs or clerks of the last year before, for occupying their places above one year, contrary to the statute of 23 Hen. VI. c. 8. (Note: 23 Hen. 6. c. 8) — repealed for England and Wales by Statute Law Revision Act 1863 (26 & 27 Vict. c. 125) and for Ireland by Statute Law (Ireland) Revision Act 1872 (35 & 36 Vict. c. 98)
- (Distress) c. 4 Felony for any Welsh or Lancashire man to take other men, their goods or chattels, under colour of distress, where they have no cause. — repealed for England and Wales by Statute Law Revision Act 1863 (26 & 27 Vict. c. 125) and for Ireland by Statute Law (Ireland) Revision Act 1872 (35 & 36 Vict. c. 98)
- (Customs) c. 5 The penalty of officers of the customs, which by colour of their offices shall distrain any man's ships or goods. — repealed by Repeal of Obsolete Statutes Act 1856 (19 & 20 Vict. c. 64)

=== Sources ===
- Chronological Table of and Index to the Statutes. Vol. 1: To the End of the Session 59 Vict. Sess. 2 (1895) (13th ed.). London: Her Majesty's Stationery Office. 1896. p. 39 – via Google Books.
- Chronological Table of the Statutes: Covering the Period from 1235 to the End of 1971. London: Her Majesty's Stationery Office. 1972. p. 33. ISBN 978-0-11-840096-1 – via Google Books.

== 1450 (29 Hen. 6) ==
The 18th Parliament of King Henry VI, which met at Westminster from 6 November 1450.

This session was also traditionally cited as 29 H. 6.

- Attainder of John Cade Act 1450 c. 1 John Cade attainted of treason, and his lands, tenements, &c. given to the King, and his blood corrupt. — repealed by Statute Law Revision Act 1948 (11 & 12 Geo. 6. c. 62)
- Safe Conducts Act 1450 c. 2 A Confirmation of the Statute of 2 Hen 5. Stat. 1. cap. 6. (Note: Safe Conducts Act 1414 (2 Hen. 5. Stat. 1. c. 6)) ordained against them which break Truces and Safe Conducts, and appointing Conservators of the same. — repealed for England and Wales by Statute Law Revision Act 1863 (26 & 27 Vict. c. 125) and for Ireland by Statute Law (Ireland) Revision Act 1872 (35 & 36 Vict. c. 98)
- (York (exemption from municipal office)) c. 3 All letters patents granted to the citizens of York to exempt them from certain offices, shall be void. The penalty of citizen who shall purchase such exemption. — repealed by Statute Law Revision Act 1948 (11 & 12 Geo. 6. c. 62)

=== Sources ===
- Chronological Table of and Index to the Statutes. Vol. 1: To the End of the Session 59 Vict. Sess. 2 (1895) (13th ed.). London: Her Majesty's Stationery Office. 1896. p. 39 – via Google Books.
- Chronological Table of the Statutes: Covering the Period from 1235 to the End of 1971. London: Her Majesty's Stationery Office. 1972. p. 33. ISBN 978-0-11-840096-1 – via Google Books.

== 1452 (31 Hen. 6) ==
The 19th Parliament of King Henry VI, which met at Reading from 6 March 1453.

This session was also traditionally cited as 31 H. 6.

- Attainder of John Cade Act 1452 c. 1 John Cade shall be adjudged a traitor, and all indictments and acts done by his authority shall be void. — repealed for England and Wales by Statute Law Revision Act 1863 (26 & 27 Vict. c. 125) and for Ireland by Statute Law (Ireland) Revision Act 1872 (35 & 36 Vict. c. 98)
- (Writs) c. 2 The penalties for those who shall disobey the King's writes, &c. or not appear before his council when warned by proclamation. — repealed for England and Wales by Statute Law Revision Act 1863 (26 & 27 Vict. c. 125) and for Ireland by Statute Law (Ireland) Revision Act 1872 (35 & 36 Vict. c. 98)
- (Attachments) c. 3 Attachments in the east and west marches shall be made in Cumberland, Westmerland, Northumberland, and the town of Newcastle only. — repealed for England and Wales by Statute Law Revision Act 1863 (26 & 27 Vict. c. 125) and for Ireland by Statute Law (Ireland) Revision Act 1872 (35 & 36 Vict. c. 98)
- Safe Conducts Act 1452 c. 4 The remedy for him who having a safe conduct is robbed upon the sea. — repealed for England and Wales by Statute Law Revision Act 1863 (26 & 27 Vict. c. 125) and for Ireland by Statute Law (Ireland) Revision Act 1872 (35 & 36 Vict. c. 98)
- c. 5 No customer, comptroller, &c. shall have any estate certain in his office. — repealed for England and Wales by Statute Law Revision Act 1863 (26 & 27 Vict. c. 125) and for Ireland by Statute Law (Ireland) Revision Act 1872 (35 & 36 Vict. c. 98)
- Outlawries Act 1452 c. 6 The statute of 20 Hen. VI. c. 2. (Note: Outlawries Act 1442 (20 Hen. 6. c. 2)) touching the forfeiture of them which be outlawed in the county of Lancaster, made perpetual. — repealed for England and Wales by Statute Law Revision Act 1863 (26 & 27 Vict. c. 125) and for Ireland by Statute Law (Ireland) Revision Act 1872 (35 & 36 Vict. c. 98)
- c. 7 Fees, wages, and rewards due to the King's officers, shall not be comprised within the statute of resumption made in the eighth and twentieth year of the King's reign. — repealed for England and Wales by Statute Law Revision Act 1863 (26 & 27 Vict. c. 125) and for Ireland by Statute Law (Ireland) Revision Act 1872 (35 & 36 Vict. c. 98)
- c. 8 A confirmation of a subsidy of wool, woolfels, and cloth transported, granted by a statute ordained 31 Hen. VI. not printed. — repealed for England and Wales by Statute Law Revision Act 1863 (26 & 27 Vict. c. 125) and for Ireland by Statute Law (Ireland) Revision Act 1872 (35 & 36 Vict. c. 98)
- c. 9 A remedy for a women inforced to be bound by statute or obligation. — repealed for England and Wales by Statute Law Revision Act 1863 (26 & 27 Vict. c. 125) and for Ireland by Statute Law (Ireland) Revision Act 1872 (35 & 36 Vict. c. 98)

=== Sources ===
- Chronological Table of and Index to the Statutes. Vol. 1: To the End of the Session 59 Vict. Sess. 2 (1895) (13th ed.). London: Her Majesty's Stationery Office. 1896. p. 39 – via Google Books.
- Chronological Table of the Statutes: Covering the Period from 1235 to the End of 1971. London: Her Majesty's Stationery Office. 1972. p. 33. ISBN 978-0-11-840096-1 – via Google Books.

== 1455 (33 Hen. 6) ==
The 20th Parliament of King Henry VI, which met at Westminster from 9 July 1455 until 12 March 1456.

This session was also traditionally cited as 33 H. 6.

- (Embezzlement) c. 1 A remedy for executors against servants that embezzle their masters goods after his death. — repealed for England and Wales by Criminal Statutes Repeal Act 1827 (7 & 8 Geo. 4. c. 27), for Ireland by Criminal Statutes (Ireland) Repeal Act 1828 (9 Geo. 4. c. 53) and for India by Criminal Law (India) Act 1828 (9 Geo. 4. c. 74)
- (Repeal of 31 Hen. 6. c. 6, jurors) c. 2 Jurors in an indictment in the county palatine of Lancaster. Of a foreigner dwelling in another county. — repealed for England and Wales by Statute Law Revision Act 1863 (26 & 27 Vict. c. 125) and for Ireland by Statute Law (Ireland) Revision Act 1872 (35 & 36 Vict. c. 98)
- (Exchequer) c. 3 A remedy for several extortions committed by the officers of the exchequer. — repealed for England and Wales by Statute Law Revision Act 1863 (26 & 27 Vict. c. 125) and for Ireland by Statute Law (Ireland) Revision Act 1872 (35 & 36 Vict. c. 98)
- (Brewing) c. 4 No person brewing ale or beer in Kent to be sold, shall, during five years, make above a hundred quarters of malt to his own use. — repealed for England and Wales by Statute Law Revision Act 1863 (26 & 27 Vict. c. 125) and for Ireland by Statute Law (Ireland) Revision Act 1872 (35 & 36 Vict. c. 98)
- Importation Act 1455 c. 5 No wrought silk belonging to the mystery of silkwomen shall be brought into this realm by the way of merchandise, during five years. — repealed for England and Wales by Statute Law Revision Act 1863 (26 & 27 Vict. c. 125) and for Ireland by Statute Law (Ireland) Revision Act 1872 (35 & 36 Vict. c. 98)
- (Fountain Abbey) c. 6 Certain privileges granted to the abbot of Fountain in the county of York. — repealed for England and Wales by Statute Law Revision Act 1863 (26 & 27 Vict. c. 125) and for Ireland by Statute Law (Ireland) Revision Act 1872 (35 & 36 Vict. c. 98)
- (Attorneys) c. 7 How many attornies may be in Norfolk, how many in Suffolk, and in Norwich. — repealed for England and Wales by Statute Law Revision Act 1863 (26 & 27 Vict. c. 125) and for Ireland by Statute Law (Ireland) Revision Act 1872 (35 & 36 Vict. c. 98)

=== Sources ===
- Chronological Table of and Index to the Statutes. Vol. 1: To the End of the Session 59 Vict. Sess. 2 (1895) (13th ed.). London: Her Majesty's Stationery Office. 1896. p. 39 – via Google Books.
- Chronological Table of the Statutes: Covering the Period from 1235 to the End of 1971. London: Her Majesty's Stationery Office. 1972. p. 33. ISBN 978-0-11-840096-1 – via Google Books.

== 1460 (39 Hen. 6) ==
The 22nd Parliament of King Henry VI, which met at Westminster from 7 October 1460.

This session was also traditionally cited as 39 H. 6.

- (Repeal of 38 Hen. 6) c. 1 The parliament holden at Coventry, 20 die Novembris, Anno 37 Hen. VI. repealed, and all acts, statutes, &c. made by authority of the same, reversed. — repealed for England and Wales by Statute Law Revision Act 1863 (26 & 27 Vict. c. 125) and for Ireland by Statute Law (Ireland) Revision Act 1872 (35 & 36 Vict. c. 98)
- (Livery of Women) c. 2 A woman at fourteen years of age at the death of her ancestor shall have livery of her land. — repealed for England and Wales by Statute Law Revision Act 1863 (26 & 27 Vict. c. 125) and for Ireland by Statute Law (Ireland) Revision Act 1872 (35 & 36 Vict. c. 98)

=== Sources ===
- Chronological Table of and Index to the Statutes. Vol. 1: To the End of the Session 59 Vict. Sess. 2 (1895) (13th ed.). London: Her Majesty's Stationery Office. 1896. p. 39 – via Google Books.
- Chronological Table of the Statutes: Covering the Period from 1235 to the End of 1971. London: Her Majesty's Stationery Office. 1972. p. 33. ISBN 978-0-11-840096-1 – via Google Books.

== See also ==
- List of acts of the Parliament of England
