= Safe Conducts Act 1414 =

Act of the Parliament of England

- Act of Parliament
- Parliament of England
- Long title: An Act for punishing Breakers of Truces and Safe Conducts: and for appointing Conservators in every Port.
- Citation: 2 Hen. 5. Stat. 1. c. 6
- Territorial extent: England and Wales; Ireland

Dates
- Royal assent: 29 May 1414
- Commencement: 30 April 1414 (Note: Start of session.)
- Repealed: England and Wales: 28 July 1863; Ireland: 10 August 1872

Other legislation
- Amended by: Safe Conducts Act 1435; Outlawries Act 1442; 20 Hen. 6. c. 11 (1442)
- Repealed by: England and Wales: Statute Law Revision Act 1863; Ireland: Statute Law (Ireland) Revision Act 1872
- Relates to: 4 Hen. 5 Stat. 2. c. 7 (1416); Safe Conducts Act 1435; 15 Hen. 6. c. 3 (1436); 18 Hen. 6. c. 8 (1439); 20 Hen. 6. c. 1 (1441); 29 Hen. 6. c. 2 (1450); 31 Hen. 6. c. 4 (1452); 14 Edw. 4. c. 4 (1475)

Status: Repealed

Text of statute as originally enacted

The Safe Conducts Act 1414 (2 Hen. 5. Stat. 1. c. 6) was an act of the Parliament of England. It made it high treason to break a truce or promise of safe conduct by killing, robbing or "spoiling" the victim. Unusually, the "voluntary receipt" or "concealing" of people who had violated this act was also stated to be treason.

Safe Conducts Act 1435
- Act of Parliament
- Parliament of England
- Long title: The statute of 2. Hen. V. stat. 1. cap. 6. touching breakers of truce, suspended.
- Citation: 14 Hen. 6. c. 8
- Territorial extent: Kingdom of England

Dates
- Royal assent: 23 December 1435
- Commencement: 10 October 1435
- Repealed: England and Wales: 28 July 1863; Ireland: 10 August 1872

Other legislation
- Amends: Safe Conducts Act 1414
- Repealed by: England and Wales: Statute Law Revision Act 1863; Ireland: Statute Law (Ireland) Revision Act 1872

Text of statute as originally enacted

The act was suspended for seven years by the Safe Conducts Act 1435 (14 Hen. 6. c. 8), and permanently repealed in 1442.

== Subsequent developments ==
The act was extended to Ireland by Poynings' Law 1495 (10 Hen. 7. c. 22 (I)).

The whole act was repealed for England and Wales by section 1 of, and the schedule to, the Statute Law Revision Act 1863 (26 & 27 Vict. c. 125), which came into force on 28 July 1863.

The whole act was repealed for Ireland by section 1 of, and the schedule to, the Statute Law (Ireland) Revision Act 1872 (35 & 36 Vict. c. 98), which came into force on 10 August 1872.

== See also ==
- Misprision of treason

== Related acts of 15th Century England ==
- Tomlins, Thomas Edlyne; Raithby, John (1811). Form of Safe Conduct Act 1436 [15 Hen. VI. - A.D. 1436 Chapter III]. The Statutes at Large, of England and of Great Britain: from Magna Carta to the Union of the Kingdoms of Great Britain and Ireland. Vol. II. London, Great Britain: George Eyre and Andrew Strahan. pp. 480–481. OCLC 1110419501 – via Internet Archive.
- Tomlins, Thomas Edlyne; Raithby, John (1811). Safe Conducts Act 1439 [18 Hen. VI. - A.D. 1439 Chapter VIII]. The Statutes at Large, of England and of Great Britain: from Magna Carta to the Union of the Kingdoms of Great Britain and Ireland. Vol. II. London, Great Britain: George Eyre and Andrew Strahan. pp. 496–499. OCLC 1110419501 – via Internet Archive.
- Tomlins, Thomas Edlyne; Raithby, John (1811). Letters of Safe Conduct Act 1441 [20 Hen. VI. - A.D. 1441 Chapter I]. The Statutes at Large, of England and of Great Britain: from Magna Carta to the Union of the Kingdoms of Great Britain and Ireland. Vol. II. London, Great Britain: George Eyre and Andrew Strahan. pp. 511–513. OCLC 1110419501 – via Internet Archive.
- Tomlins, Thomas Edlyne; Raithby, John (1811). Breakers of Truces and Safe Conducts Amendment 1450 [29 Hen. VI. - A.D. 1450 Chapter II]. The Statutes at Large, of England and of Great Britain: from Magna Carta to the Union of the Kingdoms of Great Britain and Ireland. Vol. II. London, Great Britain: George Eyre and Andrew Strahan. pp. 552–554. OCLC 1110419501 – via Internet Archive.
- Tomlins, Thomas Edlyne; Raithby, John (1811). Breach of Truce or Safe Conduct Act 1452 [31 Hen. VI. - A.D. 1452 Chapter IV]. The Statutes at Large, of England and of Great Britain: from Magna Carta to the Union of the Kingdoms of Great Britain and Ireland. Vol. II. London, Great Britain: George Eyre and Andrew Strahan. pp. 561–563. OCLC 1110419501 – via Internet Archive.
- Tomlins, Thomas Edlyne; Raithby, John (1811). Breaking of Truce and Safe Conducts Confirmation 1475 [14 Edw. IV. - A.D. 1475 Chapter IV]. The Statutes at Large, of England and of Great Britain: from Magna Carta to the Union of the Kingdoms of Great Britain and Ireland. Vol. II. London, Great Britain: George Eyre and Andrew Strahan. pp. 657–658. OCLC 1110419501 – via Internet Archive.
