= Justices of the Peace Act 1509 =

Act of the Parliament of England

- Act of Parliament
- Parliament of England
- Long title: An Act for repealing of a Statute concerning Justices of Peace.
- Citation: 1 Hen. 8. c. 6
- Territorial extent: England and Wales

Dates
- Royal assent: 23 February 1510
- Commencement: 21 January 1510 (Note: Start of session.)
- Repealed: 28 July 1863
Other legislation
Repeals/revokes	Offences against Statutes Act 1495
Repealed by	Statute Law Revision Act 1863

Status: Repealed

Text of statute as originally enacted

The Justices of the Peace Act 1509 (1 Hen. 8. c. 6) was an act of the Parliament of England that repealed the Offences against Statutes Act 1495 (11 Hen. 7. c. 3), which related to justices of the peace.

== Provisions ==
Section 1 of the act repealed the Offences against Statutes Act 1495 (11 Hen. 7. c. 3).

== Subsequent developments ==
The whole act was repealed by section 1 of, and the schedule to, the Statute Law Revision Act 1863 (26 & 27 Vict. c. 125), which came into force on 28 July 1863.
