= Peeresses Act 1441 =

Act of the Parliament of England

Peeresses Act 1441 (Note: The citation of this act by this short title was authorised by section 5 of, and the second schedule to, the Statute Law Revision Act 1948. Due to the repeal of those provisions, it is now authorised by section 19(2) of the Interpretation Act 1978.)
- Act of Parliament
- Parliament of England
- Long title: Recital of Magna Carta relating to trial by peers; Noble ladies shall be tried as peers of the realm are tried. (Note: These words are printed against this act in the second column of the second schedule to the Statute Law Revision Act 1948, which is headed "Title".)
- Citation: 20 Hen. 6. c. 9
- Territorial extent: England and Wales; Ireland

Dates
- Royal assent: 27 March 1442
- Commencement: 25 January 1442 (Note: Start of session.)
- Repealed: 13 September 1948 (Note: The Criminal Justice Act 1948 (Date of Commencement) Order 1948.)

Status: Repealed

Text of statute as originally enacted

The Peeresses Act 1441 (20 Hen. 6. c. 9) was an act of the Parliament of England. It is sometimes referred to as the Peeresses Act 1442 or the Trial of Peeresses Act 1441 or Trial of Peeresses Act 1442

== Subsequent developments ==
The whole act was repealed for England and Wales by section 83(3) of, and part I of the tenth schedule to, the Criminal Justice Act 1948 (11 & 12 Geo. 6. c. 58), which came into force on 18 April 1949.

The statute 20 Hen. 6, of which this chapter was part, was repealed for the Republic of Ireland by section 1 of, and Part 2 of the schedule to, the Statute Law Revision Act 1983.
