= List of acts of the Parliament of England, 1413–1421 =

This is a list of acts of the Parliament of England for the years 1413 until 1421.

For acts passed during the period 1707–1800, see the list of acts of the Parliament of Great Britain. See also the list of acts of the Parliament of Scotland and the list of acts of the Parliament of Ireland.

For acts passed from 1801 onwards, see the list of acts of the Parliament of the United Kingdom. For acts of the devolved parliaments and assemblies in the United Kingdom, see the list of acts of the Scottish Parliament, the list of acts of the Northern Ireland Assembly, and the list of acts and measures of Senedd Cymru; see also the list of acts of the Parliament of Northern Ireland.

For medieval statutes, etc. that are not considered to be acts of Parliament, see the list of English statutes.

The number shown after each act's title is its chapter number. Acts are cited using this number, preceded by the year(s) of the reign during which the relevant parliamentary session was held; thus the Union with Ireland Act 1800 is cited as "39 & 40 Geo. 3. c. 67", meaning the 67th act passed during the session that started in the 39th year of the reign of George III and which finished in the 40th year of that reign. Note that the modern convention is to use Arabic numerals in citations (thus "41 Geo. 3" rather than "41 Geo. III"). Acts of the last session of the Parliament of Great Britain and the first session of the Parliament of the United Kingdom are both cited as "41 Geo. 3".

Acts passed by the Parliament of England did not have a short title; however, some of these acts have subsequently been given a short title by acts of the Parliament of the United Kingdom (such as the Short Titles Act 1896).

Acts passed by the Parliament of England were deemed to have come into effect on the first day of the session in which they were passed. Because of this, the years given in the list below may in fact be the year before a particular Act was passed.

== 1413 (1 Hen. 5) ==
The 1st Parliament of King Henry V, which met at Westminster from 14 May 1413 until 9 June 1413.

This session was also traditionally cited as 1 H. 5.

- Parliamentary Elections Act 1413 c. 1 What sort of people shall be chosen, and who shall be the choosers of the knights and burgesses of the parliament. — repealed for England and Wales by Parliamentary Elections (No. 2) Act 1774 (14 Geo. 3. c. 58) and for Ireland by Statute Law (Ireland) Revision Act 1872 (35 & 36 Vict. c. 98)
- (Weirs) c. 2 A confirmation of former statutes touching wears, mills, kidels, &c. — repealed for England and Wales by Statute Law Revision Act 1863 (26 & 27 Vict. c. 125) and for Ireland by Statute Law (Ireland) Revision Act 1872 (35 & 36 Vict. c. 98)
- (Forgery) c. 3 The penalty for forging or publishing a false deed. — repealed for England and Wales by Statute Law Revision Act 1863 (26 & 27 Vict. c. 125) and for Ireland by Statute Law (Ireland) Revision Act 1872 (35 & 36 Vict. c. 98)
- (Bailiffs of sheriffs, etc.) c. 4 Sheriffs bailiffs shall not be in the same office in three years after. Sheriffs officers shall not be attornies. — repealed by Repeal of Obsolete Statutes Act 1856 (19 & 20 Vict. c. 64)
- (Statute of Additions (details on original writs and indictments)) c. 5 In which original writs additions of the defendants names shall be put. — repealed for England and Wales by Statute Law Revision and Civil Procedure Act 1883 (46 & 47 Vict. c. 49) and for Northern Ireland by Statute Law Revision Act 1950 (14 Geo. 6. c. 6)
- (Wales) c. 6 No Welshman shall take revenge against those Englishmen which did pursue their friends in the late rebellion. — repealed for England and Wales by Statute Law Revision Act 1863 (26 & 27 Vict. c. 125) and for Ireland by Statute Law (Ireland) Revision Act 1872 (35 & 36 Vict. c. 98)
- Restraint of Aliens Holding Benefices Act 1413 c. 7 A Confirmation of the Statute of 13 Rich. 2. c. 3. (Note: 13 Ric. 2. Stat. 2. c. 3) restraining Aliens to accept any Benefices in England. — repealed by Statute Law Revision Act 1948 (11 & 12 Geo. 6. c. 62)
- (Irish Mendicants, etc.) c. 8 All Irishmen and Irish clerks beggars, shall depart this realm before the first day of November, except graduates, serjeants, &c. — repealed for England and Wales by Statute Law Revision Act 1863 (26 & 27 Vict. c. 125) and for Ireland by Statute Law (Ireland) Revision Act 1872 (35 & 36 Vict. c. 98)
- (Grants of Revenues, etc. of Calais) c. 9 The revenues of Calais shall be employed to the maintenance of it. — repealed for England and Wales by Statute Law Revision Act 1863 (26 & 27 Vict. c. 125) and for Ireland by Statute Law (Ireland) Revision Act 1872 (35 & 36 Vict. c. 98)
- Corn Measure Act 1413 c. 10 An Act concerning the true Measure of Corn. — repealed for England and Wales by Statute Law Revision Act 1863 (26 & 27 Vict. c. 125) and for Ireland by Statute Law (Ireland) Revision Act 1872 (35 & 36 Vict. c. 98)

=== Sources ===
- Chronological Table of and Index to the Statutes. Vol. 1: To the End of the Session 59 Vict. Sess. 2 (1895) (13th ed.). London: Her Majesty's Stationery Office. 1896. pp. 33–34 – via Google Books.
- Chronological Table of the Statutes: Covering the Period from 1235 to the End of 1971. London: Her Majesty's Stationery Office. 1972. p. 29. ISBN 978-0-11-840096-1 – via Google Books.

== 1414 ==
=== 2 Hen. 5. Stat. 1 ===
The 2nd Parliament of King Henry V (the 'Fire and Faggot Parliament'), which met at Leicester from 30 April 1414 until 29 May 1414.

This session was also traditionally cited as 2 Hen. 5. stat. 1, 2 Hen. 5. St. 1, 2 Hen. 5. st. 1, 2 H. 5. Stat. 1, 2 Hen. 5. St. 1 or 2 H. 5. st. 1.

- (Visitation of Hospitals) c. 1 Ordinaries shall inquire of, and reform the estates of hospitals. — repealed by Statute Law Revision Act 1948 (11 & 12 Geo. 6. c. 62)
- (Certiorari) c. 2 A Corpus cum causa, or Certiorari to remove him who is in execution at another man's suit. — repealed by Civil Procedure Acts Repeal Act 1879 (42 & 43 Vict. c. 59)
- (Libels in Spiritual Courts) c. 3 A copy of the libel in the spiritual court shall be delivered. — repealed for Northern Ireland by Statute Law Revision Act 1950 (14 Geo. 6. c. 6) and for England and Wales by Ecclesiastical Jurisdiction Measure 1963 (No. 1)
- Quarter Sessions Act 1414 c. 4 What justices of peace must be resident in the same shire; and at what times they must hold their quarter-sessions. — repealed for England and Wales Statute Law Revision Act 1863 (26 & 27 Vict. c. 125), Criminal Justice Act 1925 (15 & 16 Geo. 5. c. 86) and Statute Law Revision Act 1948 (11 & 12 Geo. 6. c. 62) and for Ireland by Statute Law (Ireland) Revision Act 1872 (35 & 36 Vict. c. 98)
- (Outrages in certain franchises) c. 5 Process against felons dwelling in Tyndal or Exhamshire in Northumberland. — repealed for England and Wales by Statute Law Revision Act 1863 (26 & 27 Vict. c. 125) and for Ireland by Statute Law (Ireland) Revision Act 1872 (35 & 36 Vict. c. 98)
- Safe Conducts Act 1414 c. 6 Breaking of truce and safe conduct shall be high treason. In every port there shall be a conservator of the peace and safe conduct. — repealed for England and Wales by Statute Law Revision Act 1863 (26 & 27 Vict. c. 125) and for Ireland by Statute Law (Ireland) Revision Act 1872 (35 & 36 Vict. c. 98)
- Suppression of Heresy Act 1414 c. 7 The intent of the hereticks called Lollards. Magistrates shall assist the ordinaries in extirpating heresies and punishing hereticks. Penalty on hereticks convited. — repealed for England and Wales by Act of Supremacy 1558 (1 Eliz. 1. c. 1) and for Ireland by Statute Law (Ireland) Revision Act 1872 (35 & 36 Vict. c. 98)
- Riot Act 1414 c. 8 Commissions shall be awarded to enquire of a riot, and of the justices default therein. — repealed by Statute Law Revision Act 1948 (11 & 12 Geo. 6. c. 62) and Criminal Law Act 1967 (c. 58)
- (Murder, etc.) c. 9 A remedy to punish him that doth commit felony, and flee into an unknown place. — repealed for England and Wales by Statute Law Revision Act 1863 (26 & 27 Vict. c. 125) and for Ireland by Statute Law (Ireland) Revision Act 1872 (35 & 36 Vict. c. 98)

==== Sources ====
- Chronological Table of and Index to the Statutes. Vol. 1: To the End of the Session 59 Vict. Sess. 2 (1895) (13th ed.). London: Her Majesty's Stationery Office. 1896. p. 34 – via Google Books.
- Chronological Table of the Statutes: Covering the Period from 1235 to the End of 1971. London: Her Majesty's Stationery Office. 1972. p. 29. ISBN 978-0-11-840096-1 – via Google Books.

=== 2 Hen. 5. Stat. 2 ===
The 3rd Parliament of King Henry V, which met at Westminster from 19 November 1414.

This session was also traditionally cited as 2 Hen. 5. St. 2, 2 Hen. 5. st. 2, 2 H. 5. Stat. 2, 2 Hen. 5. St. 2 or 2 H. 5. st. 2.

- (Qualifications of justices of the peace) c. 1 What sort of men be justices of the peace. — repealed by Justices of the Peace Act 1949 (12, 13 & 14 Geo. 6. c. 101)
- (Chaplains) c. 2 The yearly wages of chaplain and parish priests settled. — repealed for England and Wales by Statute Law Revision Act 1863 (26 & 27 Vict. c. 125) and for Ireland by Statute Law (Ireland) Revision Act 1872 (35 & 36 Vict. c. 98)
- (Jurors) c. 3 On what estate those jurors must be, which are to pass touching the life of man, plea, real, or forty marks damages. — repealed for England and Wales by Statute Law Revision Act 1863 (26 & 27 Vict. c. 125) and for Ireland by Statute Law (Ireland) Revision Act 1872 (35 & 36 Vict. c. 98)
- Gilding of Silver Act 1414 c. 4 There shall be no gilding of silver ware, but of the allay of English sterling. — repealed by Repeal of Obsolete Statutes Act 1856 (19 & 20 Vict. c. 64)
- (Appearance of Welshmen) c. 5 If a Welshman, on process awarded against him for detaining an Englishman, refuse to appear, he shall be outlawed, and writs shall be issued to apprehend him. — repealed for England and Wales by Statute Law Revision Act 1863 (26 & 27 Vict. c. 125) and for Ireland by Statute Law (Ireland) Revision Act 1872 (35 & 36 Vict. c. 98)
- (Staple) c. 6 Merchandises of the Staple shall not be exported beyond Sea without the King's Licence, until they be first brought to the Staple. — repealed by Repeal of Acts Concerning Importation Act 1822 (3 Geo. 4. c. 41)

==== Sources ====
- Chronological Table of and Index to the Statutes. Vol. 1: To the End of the Session 59 Vict. Sess. 2 (1895) (13th ed.). London: Her Majesty's Stationery Office. 1896. p. 34 – via Google Books.
- Chronological Table of the Statutes: Covering the Period from 1235 to the End of 1971. London: Her Majesty's Stationery Office. 1972. p. 29. ISBN 978-0-11-840096-1 – via Google Books.

== 1415 ==
=== 3 Hen. 5 ===
The 4th Parliament of King Henry V, which met at Westminster from 4 November 1415 until 12 November 1415.

This session was also traditionally cited as 3 H. 5.

- Money Act 1415 c. 1 It shall be felony to import or offer in payment any sort of money forbidden by former statutes. — repealed for England and Wales by Statute Law Revision Act 1863 (26 & 27 Vict. c. 125) and for Ireland by Statute Law (Ireland) Revision Act 1872 (35 & 36 Vict. c. 98)

==== Sources ====
- Chronological Table of and Index to the Statutes. Vol. 1: To the End of the Session 59 Vict. Sess. 2 (1895) (13th ed.). London: Her Majesty's Stationery Office. 1896. p. 34 – via Google Books.
- Chronological Table of the Statutes: Covering the Period from 1235 to the End of 1971. London: Her Majesty's Stationery Office. 1972. p. 29. ISBN 978-0-11-840096-1 – via Google Books.

=== 4 Hen. 5. Stat. 1 ===
The 5th Parliament of King Henry V, which met at Westminster from 16 March 1416.

This session was also traditionally cited as 4 Hen. 5. St. 1, 4 Hen. 5. st. 1, 4 H. 5. Stat. 1, 4 Hen. 5. St. 1 or 4 H. 5. st. 1.

- 4 Hen. 5. Stat. 1 — cited in The Statutes at Large as 3 Hen. 5. Stat. 2
  - (Confirmation of Liberties) c. 1 A confirmation of the liberties of the church, and of all persons, cities, &c. — repealed for England and Wales by Statute Law Revision Act 1863 (26 & 27 Vict. c. 125) and for Ireland by Statute Law (Ireland) Revision Act 1872 (35 & 36 Vict. c. 98)
  - (Attorneys) c. 2 Privilege given to certain abbots, &c. to make their attornies in the courts of Stancliffe and Frendles. — repealed for England and Wales by Statute Law Revision Act 1863 (26 & 27 Vict. c. 125) and for Ireland by Statute Law (Ireland) Revision Act 1872 (35 & 36 Vict. c. 98)
  - (Bretons) c. 3 All Britons not made denizens shall depart the realm upon pain of death. — repealed for England and Wales by Statute Law Revision Act 1863 (26 & 27 Vict. c. 125) and for Ireland by Statute Law (Ireland) Revision Act 1872 (35 & 36 Vict. c. 98)
  - (Provisors) c. 4 All provisions, licences, and pardons of a benefice full of an incumbent shall be void. — repealed for England and Wales by Statute Law Revision Act 1863 (26 & 27 Vict. c. 125) and for Ireland by Statute Law (Ireland) Revision Act 1872 (35 & 36 Vict. c. 98)
  - (Attaint) c. 5 In which courts an attaint may be brought upon a false verdict given in the city of Lincoln, and by whom it shall be tried. — repealed for England and Wales by Statute Law Revision Act 1863 (26 & 27 Vict. c. 125) and for Ireland by Statute Law (Ireland) Revision Act 1872 (35 & 36 Vict. c. 98)
  - Treason Act 1415 c. 6 It shall be treason to clip, wash, or file money. — repealed by Coinage Offences Act 1832 (2 & 3 Will. 4. c. 34)
  - Forgery Act 1415 c. 7 What justices shall have authority to hear and determine the offences of falsifying of money. — repealed by Coinage Offences Act 1832 (2 & 3 Will. 4. c. 34)
  - (Proving of Testaments) c. 8 Ordinaries shall take no more for proving of testaments, with their inventories, than was taken in the time of King Edward the Third. — repealed for England and Wales by Statute Law Revision Act 1863 (26 & 27 Vict. c. 125) and for Ireland by Statute Law (Ireland) Revision Act 1872 (35 & 36 Vict. c. 98)

==== Sources ====
- Chronological Table of and Index to the Statutes. Vol. 1: To the End of the Session 59 Vict. Sess. 2 (1895) (13th ed.). London: Her Majesty's Stationery Office. 1896. p. 34 – via Google Books.
- Chronological Table of the Statutes: Covering the Period from 1235 to the End of 1971. London: Her Majesty's Stationery Office. 1972. p. 29. ISBN 978-0-11-840096-1 – via Google Books.

== 1416 (4 Hen. 5. Stat. 2) ==
The 6th Parliament of King Henry V, which met at Westminster from 19 October 1416 until 18 November 1416.

This session was also traditionally cited as 4 Hen. 5. St. 2,4 Hen. 5. st. 2, 4 H. 5. Stat. 2, 4 Hen. 5. St. 2 or 4 H. 5. st. 2.

- Confirmation of Charters and Statutes Act 1416 c. 1 A confirmation of all former statutes not repealed. —
  still in force
- (Sheriffs) c. 2 Sheriffs shall have allowance upon their accompts of things casual. — repealed for England and Wales by Statute Law Revision Act 1863 (26 & 27 Vict. c. 125) and for Ireland by Statute Law (Ireland) Revision Act 1872 (35 & 36 Vict. c. 98)
- Pattens Act 1416 c. 3 No man shall make any pattens of aspe, upon pain of an hundred shillings. — repealed for England and Wales by Continuance, etc. of Laws Act 1603 (1 Jas. 1. c. 25) and for Ireland by Statute Law (Ireland) Revision Act 1872 (35 & 36 Vict. c. 98)
- (Wages) c. 4 The penalty assigned by the statute of 12 Rich. II. cap. 4. (Note: 12 Ric. 2. c. 4) for giving or taking of excessive wages, shall be imposed upon the taker only. — repealed for England and Wales by Statute Law Revision Act 1863 (26 & 27 Vict. c. 125) and for Ireland by Statute Law (Ireland) Revision Act 1872 (35 & 36 Vict. c. 98)
- (Merchant strangers) c. 5 How merchant strangers shall be used, and hosts appointed for them. — repealed by Repeal of Acts Concerning Importation Act 1822 (3 Geo. 4. c. 41)
- (Irish) c. 6 Penalty on Irish prelates for collating an Irishman to a benefice in England, or bringing an Irishman to parliament to discover the counsel of Englishmen to rebels. — repealed by Repeal of Obsolete Statutes Act 1856 (19 & 20 Vict. c. 64)
- c. 7 In what case letters of marque may be granted. — repealed for England and Wales by Statute Law Revision Act 1863 (26 & 27 Vict. c. 125) and for Ireland by Statute Law (Ireland) Revision Act 1872 (35 & 36 Vict. c. 98)
- c. 8 The King's pardon of the suit of his peace, and of certain issues lost. — repealed for England and Wales by Statute Law Revision Act 1863 (26 & 27 Vict. c. 125) and for Ireland by Statute Law (Ireland) Revision Act 1872 (35 & 36 Vict. c. 98)

=== Sources ===
- Chronological Table of and Index to the Statutes. Vol. 1: To the End of the Session 59 Vict. Sess. 2 (1895) (13th ed.). London: Her Majesty's Stationery Office. 1896. p. 34 – via Google Books.
- Chronological Table of the Statutes: Covering the Period from 1235 to the End of 1971. London: Her Majesty's Stationery Office. 1972. p. 30. ISBN 978-0-11-840096-1 – via Google Books.
- "Acts of the English Parliament from 1416". legislation.gov.uk. The National Archives.

== 1417 (5 Hen. 5) ==
The 7th Parliament of King Henry V, which met at Westminster from 16 November 1417 until 17 December 1417.

This session was also traditionally cited as 5 H. 5.

- (Attorneys) All persons until the next parliament may make their attornies in wapentakes, hundreds, and court barons. — repealed for England and Wales by Statute Law Revision Act 1863 (26 & 27 Vict. c. 125) and for Ireland by Statute Law (Ireland) Revision Act 1872 (35 & 36 Vict. c. 98)

=== Sources ===
- Chronological Table of and Index to the Statutes. Vol. 1: To the End of the Session 59 Vict. Sess. 2 (1895) (13th ed.). London: Her Majesty's Stationery Office. 1896. p. 34 – via Google Books.
- Chronological Table of the Statutes: Covering the Period from 1235 to the End of 1971. London: Her Majesty's Stationery Office. 1972. p. 30. ISBN 978-0-11-840096-1 – via Google Books.

== 1419 (7 Hen. 5) ==
The 8th Parliament of King Henry V, which met at Westminster from 16 October 1419 until 13 November 1419.

This session was also traditionally cited as 7 H. 5.

- (Indictments, forgery) A remedy against those that indict others of felony committed in a place where there is none such. Process against makers, &c. of false deeds. — repealed for England and Wales by Criminal Law Act 1826 (7 Geo. 4. c. 64) and for Ireland by Statute Law (Ireland) Revision Act 1872 (35 & 36 Vict. c. 98)

=== Sources ===
- Chronological Table of and Index to the Statutes. Vol. 1: To the End of the Session 59 Vict. Sess. 2 (1895) (13th ed.). London: Her Majesty's Stationery Office. 1896. p. 34 – via Google Books.
- Chronological Table of the Statutes: Covering the Period from 1235 to the End of 1971. London: Her Majesty's Stationery Office. 1972. p. 30. ISBN 978-0-11-840096-1 – via Google Books.

== 1420 (8 Hen. 5) ==
The 9th Parliament of King Henry V, which met at Westminster from 2 December 1420.

This session was also traditionally cited as 8 H. 5.

- (Parliament) c. 1 Parliament writs being awarded in the name of the King's lieutenant, shall not be stayed by the King's return into England. — repealed for England and Wales by Statute Law Revision Act 1863 (26 & 27 Vict. c. 125) and for Ireland by Statute Law (Ireland) Revision Act 1872 (35 & 36 Vict. c. 98)
- (Gold and Silver) c. 2 Certain gold or silver shall be brought to the mint instead of wool or tin transported. — repealed by Repeal of Acts Concerning Importation Act 1822 (3 Geo. 4. c. 41)
- (Gold and Silver) c. 3 What things only may be gilded, and what laid on with silver. — repealed by Repeal of Obsolete Statutes Act 1856 (19 & 20 Vict. c. 64)

=== Sources ===
- Chronological Table of and Index to the Statutes. Vol. 1: To the End of the Session 59 Vict. Sess. 2 (1895) (13th ed.). London: Her Majesty's Stationery Office. 1896. p. 34 – via Google Books.
- Chronological Table of the Statutes: Covering the Period from 1235 to the End of 1971. London: Her Majesty's Stationery Office. 1972. p. 30. ISBN 978-0-11-840096-1 – via Google Books.

== 1421 ==
=== 9 Hen. 5. Stat. 1 ===
The 10th Parliament of King Henry V, which met at Westminster from 1 December 1421.

This session was also traditionally cited as 9 Hen. 5, 9 Hen. 5. St. 1, 9 Hen. 5. st. 1, 9 H. 5, 9 H. 5. Stat. 1, 9 Hen. 5. St. 1 or 9 H. 5. st. 1.

- (Indictments, etc.) c. 1 A continuance of the statute of 7 Hen. 5. (Note: 7 Hen. 5) touching indictments. — repealed for England and Wales by Criminal Law Act 1826 (7 Geo. 4. c. 64) and for Ireland by Criminal Statutes (Ireland) Repeal Act 1828 (9 Geo. 4. c. 53)
- Outlawries Act 1421 c. 2 No person outlawed in the county of Lancaster shall forfeit any lands or goods but such as he heath in the same county. — repealed for England and Wales by Statute Law Revision Act 1863 (26 & 27 Vict. c. 125) and for Ireland by Statute Law (Ireland) Revision Act 1872 (35 & 36 Vict. c. 98)
- Assizes Protection, etc. Act 1421 c. 3 Protections granted to them that be in the King's service in Normandy or France, or which shall pass with him into France. — repealed for England and Wales by Statute Law Revision Act 1863 (26 & 27 Vict. c. 125) and for Ireland by Statute Law (Ireland) Revision Act 1872 (35 & 36 Vict. c. 98)
- (Amendment) c. 4 The justices may amend defaults in records or process after judgment given. — repealed for England and Wales by Statute Law Revision and Civil Procedure Act 1883 (46 & 47 Vict. c. 49) and for Northern Ireland by Statute Law Revision Act 1950 (14 Geo. 6. c. 6)
- (Sheriffs, etc.) c. 5 During four years the King may assign sheriffs, &c. to continue in their offices above one year, notwithstanding the statute of Edward 3. stat. 1. cap. 7. (Note: 14 Edw. 3. Stat. 1. c. 7) — repealed for England and Wales by Statute Law Revision Act 1863 (26 & 27 Vict. c. 125) and for Ireland by Statute Law (Ireland) Revision Act 1872 (35 & 36 Vict. c. 98)
- (Mint at Calais) c. 6 The mint shall be at Calais. — repealed for England and Wales by Statute Law Revision Act 1863 (26 & 27 Vict. c. 125) and for Ireland by Statute Law (Ireland) Revision Act 1872 (35 & 36 Vict. c. 98)
- (Offenders in the Franchise of Ridesdale) c. 7 The statute provided 2. H. 5. stat. 1. c. 5. (Note: 2 Hen. 5. Stat. 1. c. 5) for offenders in Tyndal and Exhamshire, shall be extended against the like offenders in Ridesdale. — repealed by Statute Law Revision Act 1948 (11 & 12 Geo. 6. c. 62)
- (Offences by Scholars of Oxford) c. 8 Certain scholars of Oxford to be banished the university for certain offences. — repealed for England and Wales by Statute Law Revision Act 1863 (26 & 27 Vict. c. 125) and for Ireland by Statute Law (Ireland) Revision Act 1872 (35 & 36 Vict. c. 98)
- (Abbots, etc.) c. 9 No abbot or prior shall be appointed by any bishop to collect dismes or subsidies out of the county where he dwelleth. — repealed for England and Wales by Statute Law Revision Act 1863 (26 & 27 Vict. c. 125) and for Ireland by Statute Law (Ireland) Revision Act 1872 (35 & 36 Vict. c. 98)
- (Coal-keels at Newcastle) c. 10 Keels that carry sea-coals to Newcastle shall be measured and marked. — repealed by Repeal of Obsolete Statutes Act 1856 (19 & 20 Vict. c. 64)
- Gold Coin Act 1421 c. 11 No English Gold shall be received in Payment but by the King's Weight. — repealed for England and Wales by Statute Law Revision Act 1863 (26 & 27 Vict. c. 125) and for Ireland by Statute Law (Ireland) Revision Act 1872 (35 & 36 Vict. c. 98)
- Rochester Bridge Act 1421 c. 12 Writs purchases by the wardens of Rochester bridge, or against them, shall be good, though some of them die or be removed. — repealed by Rochester Bridge Act 1908 (8 Edw. 7. c. lvii)

==== Sources ====
- Chronological Table of and Index to the Statutes. Vol. 1: To the End of the Session 59 Vict. Sess. 2 (1895) (13th ed.). London: Her Majesty's Stationery Office. 1896. pp. 34–35 – via Google Books.
- Chronological Table of the Statutes: Covering the Period from 1235 to the End of 1971. London: Her Majesty's Stationery Office. 1972. p. 30. ISBN 978-0-11-840096-1 – via Google Books.

=== 9 Hen. 5. Stat. 2 ===
The 11th Parliament of King Henry V, which met at Westminster from 2 May 1421 until 23 May 1421.

This session was also traditionally cited as 9 Hen. 5. St. 2, 9 Hen. 5. st. 2, 9 H. 5. Stat. 2, 9 Hen. 5. St. 2 or 9 H. 5. st. 2.

- (Money) c. 1 A confirmation of all statutes made touching money. — repealed for England and Wales by Statute Law Revision Act 1863 (26 & 27 Vict. c. 125) and for Ireland by Statute Law (Ireland) Revision Act 1872 (35 & 36 Vict. c. 98)
- (Money) c. 2 All men may resort to the King's exchanges, or to the Tower, to have money new coined. — repealed for England and Wales by Statute Law Revision Act 1863 (26 & 27 Vict. c. 125) and for Ireland by Statute Law (Ireland) Revision Act 1872 (35 & 36 Vict. c. 98)
- (Money) c. 3 At the King's exchanges good money shall be delivered to the parties, or else he that doth receive it may refuse it. — repealed for England and Wales by Statute Law Revision Act 1863 (26 & 27 Vict. c. 125) and for Ireland by Statute Law (Ireland) Revision Act 1872 (35 & 36 Vict. c. 98)
- (Gold and Silver) c. 4 The officers of the exchanges shall bring to the Tower all the gold or silver which they buy or exchange. — repealed for England and Wales by Statute Law Revision Act 1863 (26 & 27 Vict. c. 125) and for Ireland by Statute Law (Ireland) Revision Act 1872 (35 & 36 Vict. c. 98)
- (Mint at Calais (No. 2)) c. 5 The mint shall be at Calais. — repealed for England and Wales by Statute Law Revision Act 1863 (26 & 27 Vict. c. 125) and for Ireland by Statute Law (Ireland) Revision Act 1872 (35 & 36 Vict. c. 98)
- (Money) c. 6 The allay and weight of money. — repealed for England and Wales by Statute Law Revision Act 1863 (26 & 27 Vict. c. 125) and for Ireland by Statute Law (Ireland) Revision Act 1872 (35 & 36 Vict. c. 98)
- (Gold Measure) c. 7 The weight of gold shall be sent to every city. — repealed for England and Wales by Statute Law Revision Act 1863 (26 & 27 Vict. c. 125) and for Ireland by Statute Law (Ireland) Revision Act 1872 (35 & 36 Vict. c. 98)
- (Weights) c. 8 Inquiry and punishment of falsities of weight. — repealed for England and Wales by Statute Law Revision Act 1863 (26 & 27 Vict. c. 125) and for Ireland by Statute Law (Ireland) Revision Act 1872 (35 & 36 Vict. c. 98)
- Exchanges Act 1421 c. 9 The law of exchange between the merchants of Rome and those of England. — repealed by Repeal of Acts Concerning Importation Act 1822 (3 Geo. 4. c. 41)
- (Tithes) c. 10 Collectors of dismes, &c. which be charged in account for their companions, shall have an action of debt against them. — repealed for England and Wales by Statute Law Revision Act 1863 (26 & 27 Vict. c. 125) and for Ireland by Statute Law (Ireland) Revision Act 1872 (35 & 36 Vict. c. 98)
- (Repair of roads and bridges between Abingdon and Dorchester) c. 11 Certain roads and bridges about Abingdon shall be repaired. — repealed by Statute Law (Repeals) Act 1978 (c. 45)

==== Sources ====
- Chronological Table of and Index to the Statutes. Vol. 1: To the End of the Session 59 Vict. Sess. 2 (1895) (13th ed.). London: Her Majesty's Stationery Office. 1896. p. 35 – via Google Books.
- Chronological Table of the Statutes: Covering the Period from 1235 to the End of 1971. London: Her Majesty's Stationery Office. 1972. p. 30. ISBN 978-0-11-840096-1 – via Google Books.

== See also ==
- List of acts of the Parliament of England
