= Launde Woods =

Nature reserve in Leicestershire, England

Coordinates: 52.624°N 0.842°W

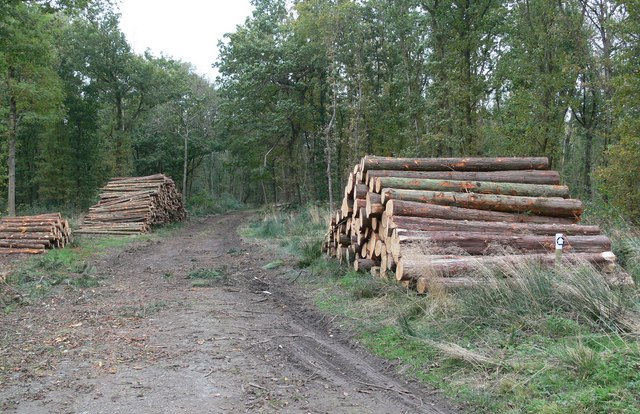
- Launde Park Wood
- Interactive map of Launde Woods
- Type: Nature reserve
- Location: Launde, Leicestershire
- OS grid: SK 785036
- Area: 99 hectares (240 acres)
- Manager: Leicestershire and Rutland Wildlife Trust

Launde Woods is a 99 hectares (240 acres) nature reserve north of Launde in Leicestershire. It is owned by the Leicester Diocesan Board of Finance and leased to the Leicestershire and Rutland Wildlife Trust. The site is in two areas, Launde Big Wood, which is a Site of Special Scientific Interest, and Launde Park Wood.

Launde Big Wood is ancient semi-natural woodland with a rich ground flora, including wood anemone, wood forget-me-not and sweet woodruff. Most of Launde Park Wood has been planted with conifers, but the northern third has the same range of plants as the Big Wood.

There is public access to the woods, which are located on either side of the road south of Launde Abbey.
