= Launde Big Wood =

Protected area in Leicestershire, England

Coordinates: 52.625°N 0.84°W

- Site of Special Scientific Interest
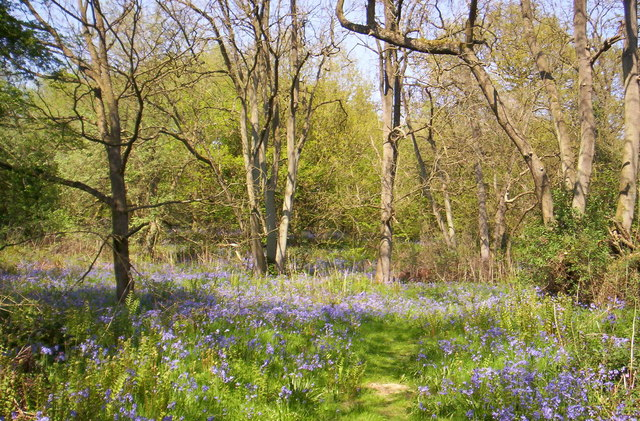
- Location of Launde Big Wood.
- Area of search: Leicestershire
- Grid reference: SK 786 037
- Interest: Biological
- Area: 41.1 hectares (102 acres)
- Notification date: 1983
- Location map: Magic Map

Launde Big Wood is a 41.1 hectares (102 acres) biological Site of Special Scientific Interest east of Leicester. It is part of Launde Woods nature reserve, which is owned by the Leicester Diocesan Board of Finance and managed by the Leicestershire and Rutland Wildlife Trust.

This wood on heavy clay is dominated by ash, and in some areas by wych elm. The ground layer has flora typical of ancient clay woods, such as bluebell, forget-me-not, yellow archangel and giant bellflower.

There is access to the site by a public footpath.
