= Launde =

Civil parish in Leicestershire, England

Coordinates: 52.629°N 0.830°W

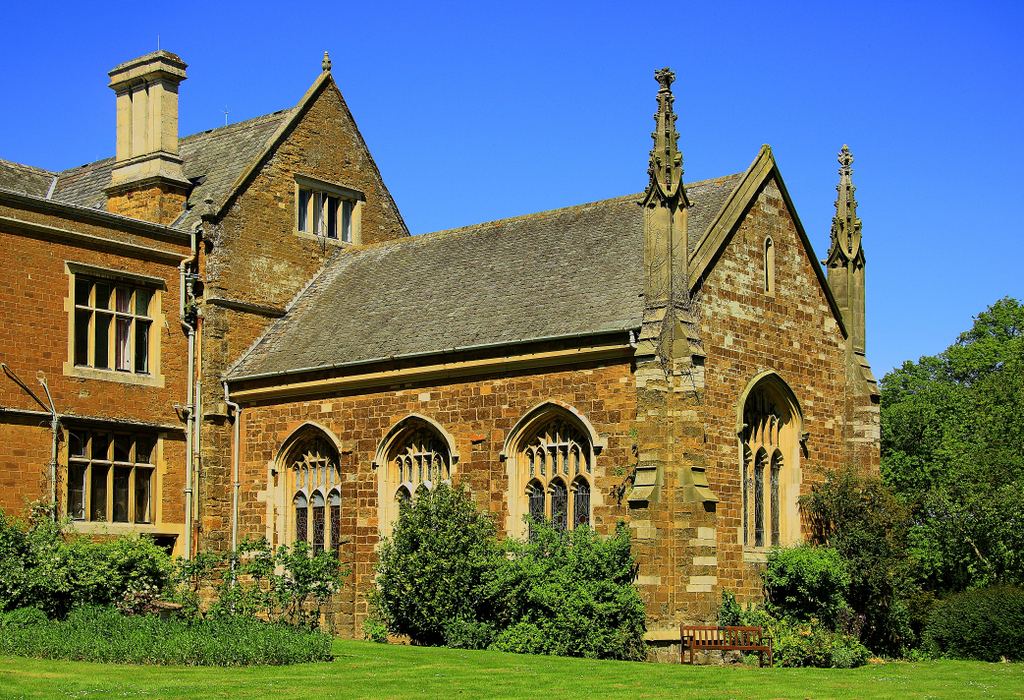
Launde chapel

Launde is a civil parish in the Harborough district of Leicestershire, bordering Rutland. The parish is the site of Launde Abbey. It gives its name to an electoral division of Leicestershire that stretches all the way from Scraptoft, Thurnby and Stoughton, near Leicester, to the border with Rutland. The civil parish population is included in the civil parish of Loddington.

Launde Park lies in the valley of the River Chater. The Elizabethan house embodies the relics of the old priory and is an E-shaped building of two storeys. The private chapel is from the Perpendicular period and contains some good stained glass. There are numerous memorials of the Simpson family who bought Launde in 1763 and enlarged the house and laid out the plantations. The estate was later owned by the Dawson family.

Launde Woods is a nature reserve managed by the Leicestershire and Rutland Wildlife Trust, and part of it is Launde Big Wood, which is a Site of Special Scientific Interest.
