= Schools Sites Act 1841 =

Act of the Parliament of the United Kingdom

Schools Sites Act 1841 (Note: The citation of this act by this short title was authorised by section 1 of, and the first schedule to, the Short Titles Act 1896. Due to the repeal of those provisions it is now authorised by section 19(2) of the Interpretation Act 1978.)
- Act of Parliament
- Parliament of the United Kingdom
- Long title: An Act to afford further Facilities for the Conveyance and Endowment of Sites for Schools.
- Citation: 4 & 5 Vict. c. 38
- Territorial extent: England and Wales; Scotland; (Note: Section 21.)

Dates
- Royal assent: 21 June 1841
- Commencement: 21 June 1841 (Note: The Acts of Parliament (Commencement) Act 1793.)

Other legislation
- Repeals/revokes: Sites for Schoolrooms Act 1836
- Amended by: Statute Law Revision Act 1874 (No. 2); Local Government Act 1933; Law Reform (Married Women and Tortfeasors) Act 1935; Rent Act 1965; Statute Law (Repeals) Act 1978; Commons Act 2006
- Relates to: Education (Scotland) Act 1942

Status: Partially repealed

Text of statute as originally enacted

Revised text of statute as amended

Text of the Schools Sites Act 1841 as in force today (including any amendments) within the United Kingdom, from legislation.gov.uk.

Schools Sites Act 1841

The Schools Sites Act 1841 (4 & 5 Vict. c. 38) is an act of the Parliament of the United Kingdom (the long title of which is An Act to afford further Facilities for the Conveyance and Endowment of Sites for Schools) which allowed land-owners to sell or donate a maximum of one acre of land to charities for the provision of schooling 'poor persons'. The act covered England and Wales and Scotland was also covered until the Education (Scotland) Act 1942 (although any donated land in Scotland under the act prior to this was not affected by the latter act).

The act was invoked 164 years later, on 27 October 2005, in the case of Fraser & Another v. Canterbury Diocesan Board of Finance. The board had sold land given under the act, mostly then used for residential development, and had kept the proceeds, despite a provision in the act that required funds raised from selling such land to be given back to the heirs of the original donor, should the land cease to be used for educational purposes. The case went all the way to the House of Lords, which ordered the proceeds of the sale to be paid to the descendants of the original donor of the land, as the act had required. The case of Fraser & Another appeared on the BBC One TV programme Heir Hunters.

== Subsequent developments ==
Sections 15 and 19 of the act were repealed by section 1(1) of, and part V of schedule 1 to, the Statute Law (Repeals) Act 1978, which came into force on 31 July 1978.
