= Medical Act 1860 =

Act of the Parliament of the United Kingdom

Medical Act 1860 (Note: The citation of this act by this short title was authorised by section 1 of, and the first schedule to, the Short Titles Act 1896. Due to the repeal of those provisions it is now authorised by section 19(2) of the Interpretation Act 1978.)
- Act of Parliament
- Parliament of the United Kingdom
- Long title: An Act to amend the Medical Act (1858).
- Citation: 23 & 24 Vict. c. 66
- Territorial extent: United Kingdom

Dates
- Royal assent: 6 August 1860
- Commencement: (Note: The Acts of Parliament (Commencement) Act 1793.)

Other legislation
- Amends: See § Repealed enactments
- Repeals/revokes: See § Repealed enactments
- Amended by: Statute Law Revision Act 1892; Statute Law (Repeals) Act 1973; Statute Law (Repeals) Act 1986

Status: Partially repealed

Text of statute as originally enacted

Revised text of statute as amended

Text of the Medical Act 1860 as in force today (including any amendments) within the United Kingdom, from legislation.gov.uk.

The Medical Act 1860 (23 & 24 Vict. c. 66) is an act of the Parliament of the United Kingdom that consolidated and amended laws relating to the medical profession in the United Kingdom .

== Provisions ==
Section 5 repealed so much of the Physicians Act 1523 (14 & 15 Hen. 8. c. 5) "as relates to the Elects of the said Royal College of Physicians of London, and their Powers and Functions".

== Subsequent developments ==
Section 1, and section 5, the words from " but this repeal " to " letters testimonial " and the words from " and the office " onwards, were repealed by section 1(1) of, and part XIII of schedule 1 to, the Statute Law (Repeals) Act 1973, which came into force on 18 July 1973.

In section 2 of the act, the words from "and any such new charter", where first occurring, onwards were repealed by section 1(1) of, and part VIII of schedule 1 to, the Statute Law (Repeals) Act 1986, which came into force on 2 May 1986.
