= Statute Law (Repeals) Act 1978 =

Act of the Parliament of the United Kingdom

Statute Law (Repeals) Act 1978 (Note: Section 4.)
- Act of Parliament
- Parliament of the United Kingdom
- Long title: An Act to promote the reform of the statute law by the repeal, in accordance with recommendations of the Law Commission and the Scottish Law Commission, of certain enactments which (except in so far as their effect is preserved) are no longer of practical utility; and to facilitate the citation of statutes.
- Citation: 1978 c. 45
- Introduced by: Lord Elwyn-Jones LC (Lords)
- Territorial extent: United Kingdom; Isle of Man (Note: Section 3(2). The Statute Law Repeals (Isle of Man) Order 1984 (SI 1984/1692).); (Note: Section 3.)

Dates
- Royal assent: 31 July 1978
- Commencement: 31 July 1978 (Note: The Acts of Parliament (Commencement) Act 1793.)

Other legislation
- Amends: School Sites 1841; School Grants Act 1855; Short Titles Act 1896; Public Records Act (Northern Ireland) 1923; See § Repealed enactments
- Repeals/revokes: See § Repealed enactments
- Amended by: Statute Law (Repeals) Act 1995; Statute Law (Repeals) Act 1998
- Relates to: See Statute Law (Repeals) Act

Status: Amended

Text of statute as originally enacted

The Statute Law (Repeals) Act 1978 (c. 45) is an act of the Parliament of the United Kingdom.

As of 2026, the act remains partly in force in the United Kingdom.

== Background ==
The act implemented recommendations contained in the ninth report on statute law revision, by the Law Commission and the Scottish Law Commission.

== Provisions ==
The power conferred by section 3(2) of the act was exercised by the Statute Law Repeals (Isle of Man) Order 1984 (SI 1984/1692).

=== Repealed enactments ===
Section 1(1) of the act repealed 357 enactments, listed in parts I to XVII of schedule 1 to the act.

==== Part I: Administration of Justice ====
Part I — Administration of Justice
Citation	Short title	Extent of repeal
6 Geo. 4. c. 62	Poor Prisoners (Scotland) Act 1825	The whole act.
6 & 7 Will. 4. c. 43	Judicial Ratifications (Scotland) Act 1836	The whole act.
32 & 33 Vict. c. 68	Evidence Further Amendment Act 1869	The whole act except as it applies to Northern Ireland.
34 & 35 Vict. c. 42	Citation Amendment (Scotland) Act 1871	The whole act.
40 & 41 Vict. c. 43	Justices Clerks Act 1877	Section 10.
45 & 46 Vict. c. 42	Civil Imprisonment (Scotland) Act 1882	Section 8.
15 & 16 Geo. 5. c. 49	Supreme Court of Judicature (Consolidation) Act 1925	In Schedule 4, the paragraph beginning with the words "For the purposes".
12, 13 & 14 Geo. 6. c. 27	Juries Act 1949	Sections 30 and 35(3). The whole act except as it applies to Scotland.
12, 13 & 14 Geo. 6. c. 101	Justices of the Peace Act 1949	Section 45(4). Section 46(2). In Schedule 7, Parts I and III.
14 Geo. 6. c. 27	Arbitration Act 1950	Section 43.
15 & 16 Geo. 6 & 1 Eliz. 2. c. 55	Magistrates' Courts Act 1952	In Schedule 4, in Part III, paragraph 3. In Schedule 5, the entry relating to the County Police Act 1840, and in the entry relating to the Summary Jurisdiction Act 1857 the word "eight".
2 & 3 Eliz. 2. c. 36	Law Reform (Limitation of Actions, &c.) Act 1954	The whole act.
2 & 3 Eliz. 2. c. 37	Superannuation (President of Industrial Court) Act 1954	The whole act.
7 & 8 Eliz. 2. c. 22	County Courts Act 1959	In section 89(3), the words "county borough". In section 147(2), the words from "notwithstanding" to "1968".
8 & 9 Eliz. 2. c. 65	Administration of Justice Act 1960	In section 18(4), the words from "but" onwards. In Schedule 3, the entry relating to the Criminal Justice Act 1948.
10 & 11 Eliz. 2. c. 15	Criminal Justice Administration Act 1962	Section 19. Schedule 1. In Schedule 4, the entry relating to the South Staffordshire Stipendiary Justice Act 1899.
1964 c. 42	Administration of Justice Act 1964	Section 31. In section 37(4), the words "section 8(5) of this Act" (where they first occur) and paragraph (a). In section 41(6), the words "section 31 and". In Schedule 3, paragraphs 8 and 12(3).
1965 c. 45	Backing of Warrants (Republic of Ireland) Act 1965	Section 9(2).
1969 c. 58	Administration of Justice Act 1969	In section 7(2), in subsection (3) added to section 89 of the County Courts Act 1959, the words "county borough". Sections 25(2), 26(2) and (3), 27(2), (4), (5), (6) and (7), 28 and 35(2). Schedule 2.

==== Part II: Charities ====
Part II — Charities
Citation	Short title	Description	Extent of repeal
11 Geo. 3. c. 10	Morden College, Kent Act 1771	An Act for carrying into Execution an Agreement made between Peter Burrell, Esquire, Surveyor-general of His Majesty's Lands, and the Trustees of Morden College, in the County of Kent, for enabling His Majesty, His Heirs and Successors, to grant Leases of Maidenstone Hill, in the Parish of East Greenwich in the County of Kent to the said Trustees, upon the Terms mentioned in the said Agreement; and for impowering the said Trustees to increase the Salaries and Pensions of the Treasurer, Chaplain, and poor Merchants, in the said College.	The whole act.
8 & 9 Eliz. 2. c. 58	Charities Act 1960	Charities Act 1960.	Section 49(2)(a) and (b).
Church Assembly Measure
1958 No. 1	Church Funds Investment Measure 1958	Church Funds Investment Measure 1958.	In section 5, in subsections (1) and (2) the words "the Minister of Education or", and in subsection (3) the words "said Minister or", and in the case of each subsection the references substituted for those words by article 3(2) of the Secretary of State for Education and Science Order 1964 and article 6(4) of the Transfer of Functions (Wales) Order 1970.

==== Part III: Constitutional Law ====
Part III — Constitutional Law
Citation	Short title	Extent of repeal
6 Ann. c. 41	Succession to the Crown Act 1707	Section 26.
56 Geo. 3. c. 98	Consolidated Fund Act 1816	Section 14.
9 Eliz. 2. c. 6	Ministers of the Crown (Parliamentary Secretaries) Act 1960	In section 4(1), the words from "being amendments" onwards. Section 5. In Schedule 1, the entry relating to the Ministry of National Insurance Act 1944.
10 & 11 Eliz. 2. c. 30	Northern Ireland Act 1962	Section 25(1)(d). In section 29(2), the words from "other" to "section".
1975 c. 24	House of Commons Disqualification Act 1975	In Part II of Schedule 1, the entry relating to the Appellate Tribunal constituted under the provisions of the National Service Act 1948 relating to conscientious objectors. In Part III of Schedule 1, the entry relating to the Chairman or Deputy Chairman of a Local Tribunal constituted under the provisions of the National Service Act 1948 relating to conscientious objectors and the entry relating to the Chairman or Reserve Chairman of a Military Service (Hardship) Committee constituted under Schedule 3 to that Act.

==== Part IV: Duchy of Cornwall ====
Part IV — Duchy of Cornwall
Citation	Short title	Description	Extent of repeal
11 Hen. 7. c. 34	Lands Assured to Prince of Wales Act 1495	An Acte for the assuering of certayne lands to the Prynce of Wales.	The whole act.
50 Geo. 3. c. 6	Duchy of Cornwall Act 1810	An Act to enable his Royal Highness George Prince of Wales, to grant Leases of certain Lands and Premises called Prince's Meadows, in the Parish of Lambeth, in the County of Surrey, Parcel of His said Royal Highnesses's Duchy of Cornwall, for the Purpose of building thereon.	The whole act.
52 Geo. 3. c. 123	Duchy of Cornwall Act 1812	Duchy of Cornwall Act 1812.	The whole act except sections 6 to 9.
1 & 2 Vict. c. 101	Duchies of Lancaster and Cornwall (Accounts) Act 1838	Duchies of Lancaster and Cornwall (Accounts) Act 1838.	In the title, the words from "revive" to "and to". The preamble. Section 1.
7 & 8 Vict. c. 105	Duchy of Cornwall (No. 2) Act 1844	Duchy of Cornwall (No. 2) Act 1844.	The whole act except sections 39, 40, 53 to 70 and 92 and the Schedules. In section 92, the definitions of "Oath" and "Conventionary Tenant".
11 & 12 Vict. c. 83	Assessionable Manors Award Act 1848	Assessionable Manors Award Act 1848.	The whole act except sections 6 and 14.
21 & 22 Vict. c. 109	Cornwall Submarine Mines Act 1858	Cornwall Submarine Mines Act 1858.	The preamble. Sections 1, 2, 7 and 9.
23 & 24 Vict. c. 53	Duchy of Cornwall Act 1860	Duchy of Cornwall Act 1860.	The whole act.

==== Part V: Education ====
Part V — Education
Citation	Short title	Description	Extent of repeal
10 Geo. 2. c. 19	Plays and Wine Licences Act 1736	An Act for the more effectual preventing the unlawful playing of Interludes within the Precincts of the two Universities in that Part of Great Britain called England, and the Places adjacent; and for explaining and amending so much of [the Act 9 Geo. 2. c. 23] as may affect the Privilege of the said Universities, with respect to licensing Taverns, and all other Publick Houses within the Precincts of the same.	The whole act.
56 Geo. 3. c. 136	Lands of Hertford College Act 1816	An Act to enable His Majesty to grant certain Lands, Tenements, and Hereditaments, escheated and devolved to His Majesty by the Dissolution of Hertford College, in the University of Oxford, and the Site of the said College and Buildings thereon, to the Chancellor, Masters and Scholars of the said University, in Trust for the Principal and other Members of Magdalen Hall, for the Purpose of their removing to such Site; and to enable the said Chancellor, Masters and Scholars of the said University, and the President and Scholars of Saint Mary Magdalen College, to do all necessary Acts for such Removal.	The whole act.
4 & 5 Vict. c. 38	School Sites Act 1841	School Sites Act 1841.	Sections 15 and 19.
19 & 20 Vict. c. xvii	Cambridge Award Act 1856	Cambridge Award Act 1856.	In section 11, the words "Tenth George the Second Chapter Nineteen, and".
7 Edw. 7. c. 43	Education (Administrative Provisions) Act 1907	Education (Administrative Provisions) Act 1907.	The whole act.
13 & 14 Geo. 5. c. 33	Universities of Oxford and Cambridge Act 1923	Universities of Oxford and Cambridge Act 1923.	Sections 2 to 4.
7 & 8 Geo. 6. c. 31	Education Act 1944	Education Act 1944.	Section 107. In section 120, subsection (2); and in the proviso to subsection (3), the words from "and Part II" onwards. In Schedule 8, Part I except the entries relating to sections 10 and 96 of the Children and Young Persons Act 1933; and Part II.
8 & 9 Geo. 6. c. 37	Education (Scotland) Act 1945	Education (Scotland) Act 1945.	In Schedule 4, the entries relating to the Unemployment Insurance Act 1935, sections 32, 50 and 65 of the Children and Young Persons (Scotland) Act 1937 and the Factories Act 1937.
9 & 10 Geo. 6. c. 50	Education Act 1946	Education Act 1946.	Sections 8(4) and 15. In Schedule 2, in Part I, the entry relating to section 86 of the Education Act 1944.
11 & 12 Geo. 6. c. 40	Education (Miscellaneous Provisions) Act 1948	Education (Miscellaneous Provisions) Act 1948.	Section 13. In Schedule 1, in Part I, the entry relating to section 48(3) of the Education Act 1944; and in the entry relating to section 116 of that Act the paragraph beginning with "In the provision".
1 & 2 Eliz. 2. c. 33	Education (Miscellaneous Provisions) Act 1953	Education (Miscellaneous Provisions) Act 1953.	Sections 13 and 19.
10 & 11 Eliz. 2. c. 12	Education Act 1962	Education Act 1962.	Section 11. In section 12(1), the words from "and 'the Scottish Act of 1946'" onwards. In section 14, subsection (3); and subsection (5) except the words "this Act shall not extend to Scotland".
10 & 11 Eliz. 2. c. 47	Education (Scotland) Act 1962	Education (Scotland) Act 1962.	In section 142(1), the words from "or under" to "1935".
1964 c. 82	Education Act 1964	Education Act 1964.	Sections 3 and 4. In section 5, in subsection (2) the words from "(except" to "thereof)"; subsection (3); in subsection (4) the words from "in" to "Wales"; and subsection (6) except the words "this Act shall not extend to Scotland".
1965 c. 3	Remuneration of Teachers Act 1965	Remuneration of Teachers Act 1965.	Section 6. In section 9(4), the words "except section 6 thereof".

==== Part VI: Elections ====
Part VI — Elections
Citation	Short title	Extent of repeal
42 & 43 Vict. c. 75	Parliamentary Elections and Corrupt Practices Act 1879	In section 2, the words from "Every certificate" onwards.
47 & 48 Vict. c. 70	Municipal Elections (Corrupt and Illegal Practices) Act 1884	The whole act.
49 & 50 Vict. c. 57	Parliamentary Elections (Returning Officers) Act (1875) Amendment Act 1886	The whole act.
7 & 8 Geo. 5. c. 64	Representation of the People Act 1918	In section 21(3), the words from "and the" onwards. Section 42. Schedule 6.
4 & 5 Geo. 6. c. 3	Local Elections and Register of Electors (Temporary Provisions) Act 1940	The whole act.
7 & 8 Geo. 6. c. 2	Local Elections and Register of Electors (Temporary Provisions) Act 1943	The whole act.
8 & 9 Geo. 6. c. 5	Representation of the People Act 1945	The whole act.
11 & 12 Geo. 6. c. 65	Representation of the People Act 1948	Section 55(1). In section 74, in subsection (1) the words from "and with respect" onwards; and in subsection (3) the words "or by the said Schedule". Section 75(1). In section 77(1), the definitions of "electoral area", "local government election", and "parish". Section 78(3). In section 80, subsections (2), (5) and (6), proviso (c) to subsection (7), and subsections (8), (9) and (10). In Schedule 10, in Part I, paragraph 6.
7 & 8 Eliz. 2. c. 22	County Courts Act 1959	Section 205(5)(e).

==== Part VII: Electricity Supply ====
Part VII — Electricity Supply
Citation	Short title	Extent of repeal
16 & 17 Geo. 5. c. 51	Electricity (Supply) Act 1926	In Schedule 6, the entry relating to section 1 of the Electricity (Supply) Act 1919, and in the entry relating to section 15 of that Act the words "by the Lord Chief Justice, or in Scotland" and "the Minister of Health (or, in the case of Scotland,".
6 & 7 Geo. 6. c. 32	Hydro-Electric Development (Scotland) Act 1943	In section 14(2), the words "or the growing produce thereof".
10 & 11 Geo. 6. c. 54	Electricity Act 1947	In Schedule 4, in Part I, the entries relating to sections 29 and 31 of the Electricity (Supply) Act 1919 and section 3 of the Electricity Supply (Meters) Act 1936.
2 & 3 Eliz. 2. c. 60	Electricity Reorganisation (Scotland) Act 1954	In section 10(2), the words from "and accordingly" onwards. Section 13. In Schedule 1, in Part II, the entries relating to sections 49 and 53 of the Electricity Act 1947.
5 & 6 Eliz. 2. c. 48	Electricity Act 1957	Section 39.
1972 c. 17	Electricity Act 1972	Sections 3 and 4(3). The Schedule.

==== Part VIII: Employment ====
Part VIII — Employment
Citation	Short title	Extent of repeal
2 & 3 Vict. c. 71	Metropolitan Police Courts Act 1839	Section 37.
10 & 11 Geo. 5. c. 65	Employment of Women, Young Persons and Children Act 1920	In the preamble, the words "and Part III" and "women and". In section 1, in subsection (3), the words "or woman" and the words "and Part III respectively"; and in subsection (6), paragraph (e). In section 3(1), the word "women". In section 4, the definition of "woman"; and in the definition of "industrial undertaking" the words "and women" and the words "and". In the Schedule, Part III.
25 & 26 Geo. 5. c. 8	Unemployment Insurance Act 1935	The whole act.
26 Geo. 5 & 1 Edw. 8. c. 22	Hours of Employment (Conventions) Act 1936	Section 1(3).
1 & 2 Geo. 6. c. 8	Unemployment Insurance Act 1938	The whole act.
8 & 9 Eliz. 2. c. 18	Local Employment Act 1960	The whole act.
1963 c. 19	Local Employment Act 1963	The whole act.
1966 c. 34	Industrial Development Act 1966	In section 16, subsections (1) and (2); and in subsection (3) the words from "and no grant" onwards. Sections 20 and 21.
1969 c. 44	National Insurance Act 1969	The whole act.
1972 c. 5	Local Employment Act 1972	Section 22(2). In Schedule 3, the entries relating to the Town and Country Planning Act 1962. Schedule 4.
Act of Parliament of Northern Ireland
1969 c. 6 (N.I.)	Mines Act (Northern Ireland) 1969	In Schedule 4, in paragraph 14, the word "women".

==== Part IX: Finance ====
Part IX — Finance
Citation	Short title	Extent of repeal
54 Geo. 3. c. 92	Probate and Legacy Duties (Ireland) Act 1814	The whole act.
56 Geo. 3. c. 98	Consolidated Fund Act 1816	Section 18.
5 & 6 Vict. c. 82	Stamp Duties (Ireland) Act 1842	The whole act.
16 & 17 Vict. c. 59	Stamp Act 1853	Section 20.
22 & 23 Vict. c. 21	Queen's Remembrancer Act 1859	Section 15. The Schedule.
31 & 32 Vict. c. 88	Court of Chancery and Exchequer Funds (Ireland) Act 1868	The whole act.
53 & 54 Vict. c. 21	Inland Revenue Regulation Act 1890	Sections 10, 14, 15, 23 and 33. In section 35(1), the words from "and order" to the end of the subsection. Sections 38(2) and 40.
7 & 8 Geo. 5. c. 31	Finance Act 1917	Section 34.
8 & 9 Geo. 5. c. 15	Finance Act 1918	Section 42.
9 & 10 Geo. 5. c. 37	War Loan Act 1919	Section 3(1).
22 & 23 Geo. 5. c. 51	Sunday Entertainments Act 1932	Section 2.
9 & 10 Geo. 6. c. 82	Cable and Wireless Act 1946	Sections 1(2) and (3), 2, 4(1), (2) and (3), 5, 6 and 7(6). Schedules 1, 2 and 3.
10 & 11 Geo. 6. c. 40	Industrial Organisation and Development Act 1947	Section 10.
12, 13 & 14 Geo. 6. c. 20	Cinematograph Film Productions (Special Loans) Act 1949	In section 9, subsection (1), and in subsection (2), the words "save as provided in subsection (1) of this section".
12, 13 & 14 Geo. 6. c. 47	Finance Act 1949	Section 15.
6 & 7 Eliz. 2. c. 11	Isle of Man Act 1958	Section 1(4).
9 & 10 Eliz. 2. c. 36	Finance Act 1961	In section 11(1), the words "and guns".
1966 c. 18	Finance Act 1966	Sections 29 and 53(6).
1972 c. 19	Sunday Cinema Act 1972	Sections 1, 3 and 4. The Schedule.
Act of Parliament of Ireland
35 Geo. 3. c. 28 (I)	Collection of Revenue Act (Ireland) 1795	The whole act.

==== Part X: Fisheries and Harbours ====
Part X — Fisheries and Harbours
Citation	Short title	Description	Extent of repeal
23 Hen. 8. c. 8	Tin (Maintenance of Ports in Devon and Cornwall) Act 1531	An Acte for the amendinge and mayntenance of the havens and portes of Plymouth, Dertmouth, Tynmouth, Falmouth and Fowey in the Counties of Devon and Cornwall.	The whole act.
27 Hen. 8. c. 23	Tin (Preservation of Ports in Devon and Cornwall) Act 1535	An Acte for the preservation of the Havens and Portes in the Counties of Devon and Cornwall.	The whole act.
30 Geo. 2. c. 21	Medway Fisheries Act 1757	An Act for the more effectual Preservation and Improvement of the Spawn and Fry of Fish in the River of Thames, and Waters of Medway; and for the better regulating the Fishery thereof.	The whole act.
22 & 23 Vict. c. 29	Repeal of Nore Tolls Act 1859	An Act to repeal a certain Toll levied upon Fishing Vessels passing the Nore.	The whole act.
24 & 25 Vict. c. 47	Harbours and Passing Tolls, &c. Act 1861	Harbours and Passing Tolls, &c. Act 1861.	Parts II and III. Sections 21, 44, 48, 54 and 56 to 64. Schedules 1 and 3.
26 & 27 Vict. c. 114	Salmon Fishery (Ireland) Act 1863	Salmon Fishery (Ireland) Act 1863.	The whole act.
31 & 32 Vict. c. 123	Salmon Fisheries (Scotland) Act 1868	Salmon Fisheries (Scotland) Act 1868.	In section 34, the words from the beginning to "Provided, that".
3 Edw. 7. c. 31	Board of Agriculture and Fisheries Act 1903	Board of Agriculture and Fisheries Act 1903.	Section 1(5).
3 & 4 Eliz. 2. c. 7	Fisheries Act 1955	Fisheries Act 1955.	Sections 3(1), 4 and 6(1).
1964 c. 72	Fishery Limits Act 1964	Fishery Limits Act 1964.	Section 3(2).

==== Part XI: Highways ====
Part XI — Highways
Citation	Short title	Description	Extent of repeal
9 Hen. 5. Stat. 2. c. 11	N/A	For the Repair of bridges at Burford and Culhamford between Abingdon and Dorchester.	The whole act.
2 & 3 Vict. c. 47	Metropolitan Police Act 1839	Metropolitan Police Act 1839.	Section 10.
10 Edw. 7 & 1 Geo. 5. c. 7	Development and Road Improvement Funds Act 1910	Development and Road Improvement Funds Act 1910.	Section 3.
1 Edw. 8 & 1 Geo. 6. c. 5	Trunk Roads Act 1936	Trunk Roads Act 1936.	In section 6(7), the words from "and subsection (1)" to "conveniences" and the word "respectively". Section 12(7), (8) and (11). In Schedule 2, the entry relating to section 3 of the Bridges Act 1929. In Schedule 4, paragraph 8. In Schedule 5, paragraphs 3 and 5 to 9.
9 & 10 Geo. 6. c. 30	Trunk Roads Act 1946	Trunk Roads Act 1946.	Section 9.
14 Geo. 6. c. 39	Public Utilities Street Works Act 1950	Public Utilities Street Works Act 1950.	In section 33(2), the words from the beginning to the word "and" immediately following paragraph (d). In Schedule 5, the entries relating to the Metropolis Management Act 1855, the Metropolis Gas Act 1860, the Local Government Act 1888 and the Public Health (Scotland) Act 1897.
14 & 15 Geo. 6. c. 25	Supplies and Services (Defence Purposes) Act 1951	Supplies and Services (Defence Purposes) Act 1951.	The whole act.
6 & 7 Eliz. 2. c. 30	Land Powers (Defence) Act 1958	Land Powers (Defence) Act 1958.	Section 1(3).
8 & 9 Eliz. 2. c. 63	Road Traffic and Roads Improvement Act 1960	Road Traffic and Roads Improvement Act 1960.	Section 22(1).

==== Part XII: Local Government and Housing ====
Part XII — Local Government and Housing
Citation	Short title	Extent of repeal
34 & 35 Vict. c. 70	Local Government Board Act 1871	In section 2, the words from "vested in" (where they first occur) to "Acts, or"; the words from "or vested in or imposed on Her" to "said schedule" and the words from "and except" onwards. In section 7, the words "according to circumstances" and "the Poor Law Board"; and the words from "or Her" onwards. In the Schedule, in Part I, the entries relating to the Registration of Births, Deaths, and Marriages enactments and the Public Improvements enactment.
46 & 47 Vict. c. 18	Municipal Corporations Act 1883	Section 12. In section 25(2), the words "and of the other parts of this Act". Section 27.
50 & 51 Vict. c. 55	Sheriffs Act 1887	In Schedule 2, the words "or of her franchises" and the words "or of his franchises".
51 & 52 Vict. c. 41	Local Government Act 1888	In section 79(3), the word "administrative". Section 82. Section 87(2) and (4). In section 100, the definitions of "county", "entire county", "administrative county", "borough", "quarter sessions borough", "parliamentary county", "parliamentary election", "parliamentary voters", "existing", "district council", "county district" and "urban authority"; the words from "where an area" to "county rate"; the definitions of "property", "expenses" and "costs"; the paragraph relating to the costs of petty sessions; and the definition of "the divisions of Lincolnshire". Section 109.
56 & 57 Vict. c. 73	Local Government Act 1894	In section 21, paragraph (1). Section 25(1). In section 26(7), the words from "and the" onwards. Sections 32, 35, 66 and 71. In section 75(2), the definitions of "parochial elector", "election", "trustees", "parochial charity", "county", "county council", "elementary school" and "prescribed". Section 84.
11 & 12 Geo. 6. c. 26	Local Government Act 1948	In section 94, in subsection (2) the words "for England and Wales or, as the case may be," (in both places), and in subsection (4) paragraph (a). In section 100, in subsection (1), the words from "rating authorities" to "for the benefit of". In section 109, in subsection (1), the words "the Minister", where they first occur, and the words from "or the Minister" to "are concerned". In section 110, the words "the Minister and as respects Scotland,". Section 143.
11 & 12 Geo. 6. c. 29	National Assistance Act 1948	Section 58.
3 & 4 Eliz. 2. c. 24	Requisitioned Houses and Housing (Amendment) Act 1955	The whole act.
5 & 6 Eliz. 2. c. 56	Housing Act 1957	In Schedule 10, the entry relating to the Requisitioned Houses and Housing (Amendment) Act 1955.
6 & 7 Eliz. 2. c. 33	Disabled Persons (Employment) Act 1958	In the Schedule, in paragraph 1(1)(d), the words "and fifty-eight".
6 & 7 Eliz. 2. c. 55	Local Government Act 1958	In section 56(1), the word "county" in "county district". Section 61. In section 63(1), the words from the beginning to "of this Act". In section 64, the words "an order or rules or". In section 66, in subsection (1), the definitions of "Act of 1955", "Area Board", "borough", "joint board", "Minister", "appropriate Minister", "parish" and "relevant expenditure"; in subsection (2), the words "Parts II to IV of", the words "county borough or county" and the words from "and in the said" onwards; and subsection (3). In section 67, proviso (f). In Schedule 8, paragraphs 27 and 28, and in paragraph 35 the words "19" and "27".
8 & 9 Eliz. 2. c. 20	Requisitioned Houses Act 1960	The whole act.
10 & 11 Eliz. 2. c. 50	Landlord and Tenant Act 1962	Section 2(2).
10 & 11 Eliz. 2. c. 56	Local Government (Records) Act 1962	Section 7(2).
1963 c. 33	London Government Act 1963	In section 1(6), the words from "(and" to "1933)" and the words from "and the council" onwards. Section 8(2). Section 62(3). In Schedule 2, paragraph 31(i) and (ii).
1966 c. 42	Local Government Act 1966	Section 37. In section 39, the words from "and the power" onwards. In section 41(1), in the definition of "local authority", the words "county borough".
1968 c. 46	Health Services and Public Health Act 1968	In section 45(5), in paragraph (b), the words "and 58".
1970 c. 42	Local Authority Social Services Act 1970	In Schedule 1, the entry relating to section 58 of the National Assistance Act 1948.
1972 c. 66	Poisons Act 1972	In section 11(2), in paragraph (a) of the definition of "local authority", the words "county borough".
1972 c. 70	Local Government Act 1972	In section 88(2), the words from the beginning to "council" (where first occurring). In Schedule 2, paragraphs 6(4), 7(3) and 8 and Part II.
1973 c. 65	Local Government (Scotland) Act 1973	Section 171(3).
1977 c. 42	Rent Act 1977	In Schedule 23, paragraph 21.

==== Part XIII: Museums and Galleries ====
Part XIII — Museums and Galleries
Citation	Short title	Extent of repeal
29 & 30 Vict. c. 83	National Gallery Enlargement Act 1866	The whole act, except sections 1, 3, 16, 17, 20 and 29.
30 & 31 Vict. c. 41	National Gallery Enlargement Act 1867	The whole act.
52 & 53 Vict. c. 25	National Portrait Gallery Act 1889	The whole act.
1 Edw. 7. c. 16	National Gallery (Purchase of Adjacent Land) Act 1901	The whole act.
22 & 23 Geo. 5. c. 34	British Museum Act 1932	Section 2(2).
1963 c. 24	British Museum Act 1963	Section 13(3).

==== Part XIV: Property ====
Part XIV — Property
Citation	Short title	Description	Extent of repeal
11 Hen. 7. c. 35	Lands Assured to Duke of York Act 1495	(Lands assured to Duke of York).	The whole act.
11 Hen. 7. c. 36	Estates of Duchess of Bedford Act 1495	(Estates of Duchess of Bedford).	The whole act.
11 Hen. 7. c. 37	Estates of Marquis of Dorset and Wife Act 1495	(Estates of Marquis of Dorset and Wife).	The whole act.
11 Hen. 7. c. 39	Estates of Earl of Suffolk Act 1495	(Estates of Earl of Suffolk).	The whole act.
11 Hen. 7. c. 40	Estates of Earl of Surrey Act 1495	(Estates of Earl of Surrey).	The whole act.
12 Hen. 7. c. 8 (Note: This is the citation in The Statutes of the Realm.)	Feoffments Made by the King Act 1496	(Feoffments made by the King).	The whole act.
19 Hen. 7. c. 26	Prince of Wales Act 1503	(Prince of Wales).	The whole act.
19 Hen. 7. c. 29	Monastery of Syon Act 1503	(Monastery of Syon).	The whole act.
19 Hen. 7. c. 30	Partition of Lands (Barkley and Earl of Surrey) Act 1503	(Partition of Lands: Barkley and Earl of Surrey).	The whole act.
19 Hen. 7. c. 33	Estates of Lord Wells Act 1503	(Estates of Lord Wells).	The whole act.
3 Hen. 8. c. 16	Estates of Earl of Surrey Act 1511	(Estates of Earl of Surrey).	The whole act.
3 Hen. 8. c. 18	Grant to William Compton Act 1511	(Grant to William Compton).	The whole act.
4 Hen. 8. c. 10	Grant to Earl and Countess of Devon Act 1512	(Grant to Earl and Countess of Devon).	The whole act.
4 Hen. 8. c. 11	Countess of Devon and Hugh Conway Act 1512	(Countess of Devon and Hugh Conway).	The whole act.
4 Hen. 8. c. 12	Countess of Devon and William Knyvet Act 1512	(Countess of Devon and William Knyvet).	The whole act.
4 Hen. 8. c. 13	Estates of Earl of Surrey Act 1512	(Estates of Earl of Surrey).	The whole act.
5 Hen. 8. c. 9	Creation of Duke of Norfolk Act 1513	The Creacion of the Duke of Norfolk.	The whole act.
5 Hen. 8. c. 10	Creation of Duke of Suffolk Act 1513	The Creacion of the Duke of Suffolk.	The whole act.
5 Hen. 8. c. 11	Creation of Earl of Surrey Act 1513	The Creacion of the Erle of Surrey.	The whole act.
5 Hen. 8. c. 14	Dowry of Countess of Oxford Act 1513	An Acte concernyng the Dourey of the Countesse of Oxford.	The whole act.
5 Hen. 8. c. 18	Sir Edward Poynings Act 1513	An Acte concernyng Sir Edwarde Poynynges.	The whole act.
6 Hen. 8. c. 19	Grant to Duke of Norfolk Act 1514	Ratificacion of the Kings graunte made to the Duke of Norfolk.	The whole act.
6 Hen. 8. c. 20	Letters Patent to Duke of Suffolk Act 1514	Ratificacion of the Kings letters patents to the Duke of Suffolk.	The whole act.
6 Hen. 8. c. 23	Assurance of Manor of Hanworth Act 1514	Thassuraunce of the titles of the Kings Manour of Hanworth.	The whole act.
14 & 15 Hen. 8. c. 18	Royal Manor of Beaulieu Act 1523	Thacte concernyng the Kynges Honour of Beuleu.	The whole act.
14 & 15 Hen. 8. c. 24	Sale of Land to Sir William Compton Act 1523	(Sale of land to Sir William Compton).	The whole act.
14 & 15 Hen. 8. c. 25	Sale of Land to Thomas Kitson Act 1523	(Sale of land to Thomas Kitson).	The whole act.
14 & 15 Hen. 8. c. 26	Sale of Land to Sir Richard Sacheverell Act 1523	(Sale of land to Sir Richard Sacheverell).	The whole act.
14 & 15 Hen. 8. c. 27	Grant to Lord Marney Act 1523	(Grant to Lord Marny).	The whole act.
14 & 15 Hen. 8. c. 30	Grant to Earl of Northumberland Act 1523	(Grant to Earl of Northumberland).	The whole act.
14 & 15 Hen. 8. c. 31	Grants to Sir Andrew Windsor and Anthony Windsor Act 1523	(Grants to Sir Andrew Windsor and Anthony Windsor).	The whole act.
14 & 15 Hen. 8. c. 33	Grant to Earl of Shrewsbury Act 1523	(Grant to Earl of Shrewsbury).	The whole act.
14 & 15 Hen. 8. c. 34	Jointure of Elizabeth Talboys Act 1523	(Jointure of Elizabeth Talboys).	The whole act.
21 Hen. 8. c. 22	Assurance to Duke of Norfolk Act 1529	An Acte for thassuraunce of dyvers Mannors Landes and Tenements to Thomas Duke of Norfolk, and theires males of his bodye lawfullie begotten.	The whole act.
21 Hen. 8. c. 26	Assurance to Duchess of Norfolk Act 1529	An Acte for thassuraunce of certaine Landes to Elizabeth Duches of Norfolk duringe hir life and after hir decease to Thomas Duke of Norfolk hir housbonde for ever and his heires.	The whole act.
22 Hen. 8. c. 17	Duke of Richmond Act 1530	An Acte concernyng the Duke of Rychemond.	The whole act.
22 Hen. 8. c. 19	Assurance to Heirs of Sir William Fyloll Act 1530	An Acte concernyng the assuraunce of certen Londs to the Heyres of Syr William Fyloll.	The whole act.
22 Hen. 8. c. 21	Exchange between King and Heirs of Lord Montague Act 1530	An Acte of Exchaung betwene the Kyngs Highnes and the heyres of the Lord Marques Mountegue.	The whole act.
22 Hen. 8. c. 22	Annuities Granted out of Bishopric of Winchester Act 1530	An Acte concernyng certen Anuytes graunted oute of the Bysshopriche of Wynchester.	The whole act.
22 Hen. 8. c. 23	Jointure of Countess of Derby Act 1530	An Acte concernyng the assuraunce of the Joyntor of the Lady Dorathie Countesse of Derby.	The whole act.
23 Hen. 8. c. 21	Exchange of Lands between the King and Abbot of Westminster Act 1531	An Acte concernyng an Exchaung of certeyn londz betwene the Kings Highnes & the Abbot of Westminster.	The whole act.
23 Hen. 8. c. 22	Exchange of Lands between the King and Christ's College, Cambridge Act 1531	An Acte concernyng an Exchaung of Londz betwene the Kyngs Highnes & the Master Fellowes & Scolers of Crystes Colledg in Cambrydg.	The whole act.
23 Hen. 8. c. 23	Exchange of Lands between the King and Abbot of Waltham Act 1531	An Acte concernyng an Exchaung of Londz betwene the Kyngs Highnes & the Abbot of Waltham of Holy Crosse.	The whole act.
23 Hen. 8. c. 24	Exchange of Lands between the King and Provost of Eton Act 1531	An Acte concernyng an Exchaung of certen Londz betwene the Kyngz Highnes & the Provost of Eton.	The whole act.
23 Hen. 8. c. 25	Exchange of Lands between the King and Abbot of St Albans Act 1531	An Acte concernyng an Exchaung of Londz betwene the Kyngs Highnes & the Abbot of Seynt Albones.	The whole act.
23 Hen. 8. c. 26	Exchange of Lands between the King and Prior of St John of Jerusalem Act 1531	An Acte concernyng the Exchaung of certen Londz betwene the Kyngz Highnes & the Lord of Seynt Johns.	The whole act.
23 Hen. 8. c. 27	Exchange of Lands between the King and Prior of Sheene Act 1531	An Acte concernyng an Exchaung of Landz betwene the Kyngs Highnes & the Pryour of Shene.	The whole act.
23 Hen. 8. c. 28	Exchange of Lands between the King, the Duke of Richmond and Lord Lumley Act 1531	An Acte concernyng an Exchaunge of Londs betwene the Kyngs Highnes the Duke of Rychemond & the Lorde Lumley.	The whole act.
23 Hen. 8. c. 29	Lands of Earl of Surrey Act 1531	An Acte concernyng the Assuraunce of certen Londz unto Henry Erle of Surrey in consyderacyon of his Maryage.	The whole act.
23 Hen. 8. c. 30	Manor of Hunsdon Act 1531	An Acte concernyng the Manour of Hunsdon from hensforth to be called the Honoure of Hunesdon.	The whole act.
23 Hen. 8. c. 31	Jointure of Countess of Wiltshire Act 1531	An Acte concernyng the Assuraunce of the Joynture of the Lady Elizabeth Countes of Wiltshyre.	The whole act.
23 Hen. 8. c. 32	Award to heirs of Earl of Oxford Act 1531	An Acte concernyng an Award made by the Kyngs Highnes of Coopcenory unto the heyres generall of the Erle of Oxford.	The whole act.
23 Hen. 8. c. 33	Jointure of Dowager Countess of Oxford and Countess of Oxford Act 1531	An Acte concernyng the Assuraunce of the Joyntures of the Lady Anne & the Lady Elizabeth Counteses of Oxford.	The whole act.
24 Hen. 8. c. 14	Lands of Walter Walsh Act 1532	An Acte concernyng the Assuraunce of certen Londs unto Walter Wallsh and Dame Elizabeth his wyff late the wyff of Syr Willyam Compton knyght decessed.	The whole act.
25 Hen. 8. c. 23	Discharge of Payment by Plymouth to Plympton Monastery Act 1533	An Acte concernyng the Towne of Plymmouthe.	The whole act.
25 Hen. 8. c. 24	Exchange of Lands, Duke of Norfolk and Earl of Oxford Act 1533	An Acte of Exchaung of certen Londz betwene the Duke of Norfolk & the heyres generall of the Erle of Oxford.	The whole act.
25 Hen. 8. c. 26	Exchange of Lands, King and Abbot of Waltham Act 1533	An Acte concernyng an Exchaung of certeyn Londs betwene the Kyngs Highnes & the Abbott of Walltham.	The whole act.
25 Hen. 8. c. 30	Exchange between King, Duke of Richmond and Lord Lumley Act 1533	An Acte betwene the Kyngz Highnes the Duke of Rychemond & the Lord Lumley.	The whole act.
25 Hen. 8. c. 31	Assurance of Manor of Pyssowe Act 1533	An Acte concernyng the assuraunce of the Maner of Pyssowe to the Kings Highnes and his heires.	The whole act.
25 Hen. 8. c. 33	Assurance of Christchurch, London to the King Act 1533	An Acte concernyng the Assuraunce of Christ Churche in London to the Kyngs Highnes and to his heires.	The whole act.
26 Hen. 8. c. 20	Assurance of Lands to Duke of Norfolk Act 1534	An Acte concernyng the assurance of certen Londz unto Thomas Duke of Norfolk & others.	The whole act.
26 Hen. 8. c. 21	Assurance of Lands to Duke of Richmond Act 1534	An Acte concernyng the assuraunce of certen Londes unto the Duke of Rychemond and his heires.	The whole act.
26 Hen. 8. c. 24	Exchange between the King and Abbot of Waltham Act 1534	An Acte of exchaunge betwene the Kyng and Thabbott of Waltham.	The whole act.
27 Hen. 8. c. 29	Assurance of Manor of Grenes Norton Act 1535	An Acte concernyng the assuraunce of the Maner of Grenes Norton to the Kyngs Highnes and his heires.	The whole act.
27 Hen. 8. c. 30	Jointure of Lady Elizabeth Vaux Act 1535	An Acte concernyng the assuraunce of certen Londs to the Lady Elizabeth Vaulx in recompence of her Joynture.	The whole act.
27 Hen. 8. c. 31	Lands of Lord Awdeley Act 1535	An Acte concernyng the assuraunce of certen Londs to the Kyngs Highnes and his heyres late apperteynyng unto John Tuchet Knyght Lorde Awdeley.	The whole act.
27 Hen. 8. c. 32	Agreement, Earl of Rutland and City of York Act 1535	An Acte conteynyng a concord and agrement betwene the Erle of Rutlond & the Cyte of Yorke and others.	The whole act.
27 Hen. 8. c. 33	Exchange of Lands, King, Duke of Norfolk and Prior of Thetford Act 1535	An Acte concernyng an exchaunge of certen Londs betwene the Kyngs Highnes the Duke of Norfolk & the Priour & Covent of Thetford.	The whole act.
27 Hen. 8. c. 34	Exchange of Lands, King and Archbishop of Canterbury Act 1535	An Acte concernyng an exchaunge of certen Londs betwene the Kyngs Highnes and the Archebisshop of Canterburye.	The whole act.
27 Hen. 8. c. 36	Jointure of Lady Clifford Act 1535	An Acte concernyng the assuraunce of the Lady Elianour Clyffordes Joynture.	The whole act.
27 Hen. 8. c. 37	Pardon to Duke of Suffolk Act 1535	An Acte concernyng the Kyngs gracyouse pardon graunted unto the Duke of Suffolk.	The whole act.
27 Hen. 8. c. 38	Exchange of Lands, King, Duke of Suffolk and Earl of Northumberland Act 1535	An Acte concernyng an exchaunge of certen londs betwene the Kyngs Highnes the Duke of Suffolk and Therle of Northumberland.	The whole act.
27 Hen. 8. c. 39	Assurance of Lands to King and Duke of Suffolk Act 1535	An Acte concernyng the assuraunce of the Duke of Suffolk place in Southwerk to the Kyngs Highnes and his Heyres; and concernyng also the assuraunce of Norwiche place unto the Duke of Suffolk and his Heires.	The whole act.
27 Hen. 8. c. 40	Agreement, Duke of Suffolk and Sir Christopher Willoughby Act 1535	An Acte conteynyng an agreament betwene Charles Duke of Suffolk and Sir Crystofer Wylloughby.	The whole act.
27 Hen. 8. c. 43	Award Sir Piers Dutton and Sir William Molineux Act 1535	An Acte betwene Syr Pers Dutton & others.	The whole act.
27 Hen. 8. c. 44	Partition of Lands between the heirs of Lord Broke Act 1535	An Acte concernyng the partycyon of Londs betwene the heyres of the Lord Broke.	The whole act.
27 Hen. 8. c. 45	Assurance to King of temporalities of See of Norwich Act 1535	An Acte concernyng the assuraunce of all the Temporaltyes belonging unto the Bisshopptriche of Norwiche unto the Kings Highnes and his heires.	The whole act.
27 Hen. 8. c. 46	Partition of Lands Lord Thomas Howard and Sir Thomas Poynings Act 1535	An Acte concernyng the particyon of certen Londs betwene the Lord Thomas Howard and Sir Thomas Ponyngs Knyght.	The whole act.
27 Hen. 8. c. 47	Assurance to King of land of Earl of Northumberland Act 1535	An Acte concernyng thassuraunce of the possessyons of the Erle of Northumberland to the Kyngs Highnes & his Heyres.	The whole act.
27 Hen. 8. c. 48	Assurance of Lands to Lord Chancellor Awdeley Act 1535	An Acte concernyng the assuraunce of certen Londs unto Sir Thomas Awdeley Knight Lorde Chauncellour of Englond and his heyres.	The whole act.
27 Hen. 8. c. 49	Assurance of Lands in Cheape to City of London Act 1535	An Acte concernyng the Assuraunce of a voyde plotte of grounde being in Chepe in London to the Mayer and Comynaltye of the sayd Cyte of London and their Successours.	The whole act.
27 Hen. 8. c. 50	Assurance of Manor of Halynge to King Act 1535	An Acte concernyng the assuraunce of the maner of Halyng to the Kings Highnes and his heires.	The whole act.
27 Hen. 8. c. 51	Assurance of Manor of Collyweston to Queen Act 1535	An Acte concernyng the Assuraunce of the Lordship and Maner of Collyweston to the Quenes Grace for terme of her lyffe.	The whole act.
27 Hen. 8. c. 52	Exchange of Lands, King and Corpus Christi College, Oxford Act 1535	An Acte concernyng an exchaunge of Londs betwene the Kyngs Highnes and the Presydent and Scolers of Corpus Christi College in the Universyte of Oxford.	The whole act.
27 Hen. 8. c. 53	Exchange of Lands, King and Prior of Marton Abbey Act 1535	An Acte concernyng an exchaung of Londs betwene the Kyngs Highnes and the Prior and Covent of Marten Abbaye.	The whole act.
27 Hen. 8. c. 54	Assurance of Lands to Sir Arthur Darcy Act 1535	An Acte concernyng the assuraunce of certen Londs unto Sir Arthure Darcy Knyght & his heyres.	The whole act.
27 Hen. 8. c. 55	Assurance of Lands to Anne Fitzwilliam Act 1535	An Acte concernyng the assuraunce of certen Londs unto Anne Fittzwilliam in recompence of her Joynture.	The whole act.
27 Hen. 8. c. 56	Assurance of Land to Lord William Howard Act 1535	An Acte concernyng the assuraunce of certen Londs unto the Lord William Howarde for William Howarde for terme of his lyffe.	The whole act.
27 Hen. 8. c. 57	Assurance of Lands to Thomas Pope Act 1535	An Acte concernyng the assuraunce of certen Londs unto Thomas Pope.	The whole act.
27 Hen. 8. c. 58	Annulment of Feoffment by Sir Thomas More Act 1535	An Acte adnullyng aswell a Dede of Feoffement as also an Indenture fraudelently made by Sir Thomas More Knight of his purchased Londs in Chelseth or ellswhere in the Countye of Middlesex.	The whole act.
27 Hen. 8. c. 61	Assurance of Manor of Bromhill to King Act 1535	An Acte concernyng the assuraunce of the Maner of Bromhill to the Kyngs Highnes and unto his heyres.	The whole act.
28 Hen. 8. c. 19	Assurance of Lands to St. Saviour's Bermondsey, to King Act 1536	An Acte concernyng the assuraunce of the Maner or Hyde of Southwark unto the Kyngs Highnes his heyres and Successours, late belongyng to the Monastery or House of Seynt Savyour of Barmondesey.	The whole act.
28 Hen. 8. c. 20	Assurance of Lands to Dame Grace Parker Act 1536	An Acte concernyng the assuraunce of certeyn Londes unto Dame Grace, wyfe unto Sir Henry Parker sonne and heyre apparaunt unto Henry Lord Morley, in recompence of her Joynture.	The whole act.
28 Hen. 8. c. 21	Exchange of Lands between the King and Prior of St. John of Jerusalem Act 1536	An Acte concernyng an exchaunge of certeyn Londes betwene the Kyngs Highnes and the Lord Pryour of Seynt Johns Jerusalem in Englond and his Cobrethern.	The whole act.
28 Hen. 8. c. 22	Assurance of Lands of Earl of Warwick to King Act 1536	An Acte concernyng the assuraunce of certen Londs unto the Kyngs Highnes somtyme belongyng to the Erldom of Warwike.	The whole act.
28 Hen. 8. c. 25	Assurance of Lands to Lord Beauchamp Act 1536	An Acte concernyng the assuraunce of certen Londs unto Sir Edward Seymor Knyght Vicount Beauchamp.	The whole act.
28 Hen. 8. c. 26	Assurance of Lands at Kew to Lord Beauchamp Act 1536	An Acte concernyng assuraunce of a messuage and certen Londs in Kewe unto Sir Edward Semer Vicount Beauchamp, & to the Lady Anne his Wyfe.	The whole act.
28 Hen. 8. c. 28	Assurance of Richard's Castle to John Onley Act 1536	An Acte concernyng the assuraunce of the moitie of Ricardes Castell unto John Onley and unto his heires.	The whole act.
28 Hen. 8. c. 29	Exchange of Lands between the King and Abbot of Westminster Act 1536	An Acte concernyng an exchaunge of certen Londs betwene the Kyngs Highnes and the Abbott of Westminster, for Covent Gardeyn.	The whole act.
28 Hen. 8. c. 30	Assurance of Stanton Barrey to King Act 1536	An Acte concernyng the assuraunce of Stanton Barrey to the Kyngs Highnes and his heyres.	The whole act.
28 Hen. 8. c. 32	Assurance of lands to King from Sir William Essex and others Act 1536	An Acte concernyng the assuraunce of certen Londs unto the Kyngs Highnes and his heyres from Sir William Essex Sir Hugh Vaughan William Jenyns & others.	The whole act.
28 Hen. 8. c. 33	Exchange between the King and Bishop of Durham Act 1536	An Acte concernyng an exchaung betwene the Kyngs Highnes and the Bisshop of Duresme for Duresme Place.	The whole act.
28 Hen. 8. c. 34	Assurance of Baynard's castle to Duke of Richmond Act 1536	An Acte concernyng the assuraunce of Bayneyards Castell unto the Duke of Richemond and unto his heyres.	The whole act.
28 Hen. 8. c. 35	Exchange of Lands between the King and Lord Sandys Act 1536	An Acte concernyng an exchaunge of certen Londs bethweyne the Kyngs Highnes and the Lord Sandes.	The whole act.
28 Hen. 8. c. 36	Award to Sir Adrian Fortescue and Sir Walter Stonor Act 1536	An Acte ratefyeng of an Awarde made by the Kyngs Highnes betwene Syr Adryan Fortescue and Syr Walter Stoner.	The whole act.
28 Hen. 8. c. 37	Marriage of Richard Devereux Act 1536	An Acte concernyng a mariage to be hadd betwene Richard Deveroux sonne and heyre apparaunt of Walter Deveroux Knyght Lorde Ferrers and Lady Dorathie doughter unto the Erle of Huntyngton.	The whole act.
28 Hen. 8. c. 38	Assurance of Manors of Southwark and Parysgarden Hyde to the Queen Act 1536	An Acte concernyng the assuraunce of the Maners of Parysgarden Hyde and others to the Quenys Grace.	The whole act.
28 Hen. 8. c. 39	Assurance of lands of Earldom of March to King Act 1536	An Acte concernyng the assuraunce of certen Londs unto the Kyngs Majestie and unto his heires somtyme belongyng unto the Erldome of Marche.	The whole act.
28 Hen. 8. c. 40	Assurance of Manor of Kyrteling to Edward North Act 1536	An Acte concernyng the assuraunce of the Maner of Kyrtelyng unto Edward Northe and his heires.	The whole act.
28 Hen. 8. c. 41	Assurance of Manor of Birmingham to King Act 1536	An Acte concernyng the assuraunce of the Maner of Birmyngeham to the Kyngs Highnes and his heyres.	The whole act.
28 Hen. 8. c. 42	Exchange of lands, King and Abbot of Abingdon Act 1536	An Acte concernyng an Exchaunge of certen Londes betwene the Kyngs Highnes the Abbott of Abyngdon and others.	The whole act.
28 Hen. 8. c. 43	Assurance of lands to Thomas Jermyn Act 1536	An Acte concernyng the Assuraunce of certen Londs unto Thomas Jermyn and his heyres.	The whole act.
28 Hen. 8. c. 44	Assurance of Manor of Haslingfield to Prior of Charterhouse Act 1536	An Acte concernyng the assuraunce of the Maner of Haselyngfeld unto the Priour and Covent of Charter House nyghe London and to there successours for ever.	The whole act.
28 Hen. 8. c. 46	Assurance of lands to Thomas Hatcliffe Act 1536	An Acte concernyng the assuraunce of certen Londs unto Thomas Hatclyff Squyer & unto his heires.	The whole act.
28 Hen. 8. c. 47	Assurance of lands to John Gostwick Act 1536	An Acte concernyng the assuraunce of certen Londs unto John Gostwyke and his heires.	The whole act.
28 Hen. 8. c. 48	Marriage of Lord Bulbeck Act 1536	An Acte concernyng a mariage to be hadd and solemnyzed betwene the Lord Bulbeke sonne and heyre apparaunt unto the Erle of Oxford and the Lady Dorathie eldest Daughter of the Erle of Westmoreland.	The whole act.
28 Hen. 8. c. 49	Exchange of lands, King and Abbot of Westminster Act 1536	An Acte concernyng an Exchaunge of Londs betwene the Kyngs Highnes and the Abbot and Covent of Westminster.	The whole act.
28 Hen. 8. c. 50	Exchange of lands, King, Archbishop of Canterbury and Thomas Cromwell Act 1536	An Acte concernyng an exchaung of Londs betwene the Kings Highnes, the Archebisshop of Caunterburye, and Thomas Crumwell Esquyre the Kyngs chieff Secretory.	The whole act.
28 Hen. 8. c. 51	Assurance of lands to Duchess of Suffolk Act 1536	An Acte concernyng thassuraunce of certayn Londs unto the Lady Katheryn Duches of Suffolk, in recompence of her Jointure.	The whole act.
31 Hen. 8. c. 5	Manor of Hampton Court Act 1539	An Acte wherby the Manor of Hampton Courte is made an Honor.	The whole act.
33 Hen. 8. c. 26	Conveyances by Sir John Shelton Made Void Act 1541	A Bill towching thannihilating off certayne conveyances devised by Sir Jhon Shelton.	The whole act.
33 Hen. 8. c. 37	Honour of Ampthill Act 1541	An Acte touchinge the Honor of Ampthill.	The whole act.
33 Hen. 8. c. 38	Honour of Grafton Act 1541	An Acte concerninge the Honor of Grafton.	The whole act.
34 & 35 Hen. 8. c. 21	Confirmation of Grants Act 1542	An Acte for the confirmacon of letters patents notwithstanding mysnaming of any thing conteyned in the same.	The whole act.
37 Hen. 8. c. 18	Crown Lands (Honours of Westminster, Kingston, Saint Osyth's, and Donington) Act 1545	An Acte for the ereccon of the Honors of Westminster Kingeston St. Osithes & Donyngton.	The whole act.
2 & 3 Edw. 6. c. 12	Assurance of Lands of Duke of Somerset Act 1548	An Acte for the assuraunce to the Tenantes of Graunts and Leases made of the Duke of Somersetts demene Londs.	The whole act.
21 Jas. 1. c. 30	Exchange of Lands (King and Archbishop of York) Act 1623	An Acte for the assuring of a Messuag called Yorke Howse & other Tenements to the Kinge, and for other Lands to the Archbysshopp of Yorke in leiwe thereof.	The whole act.
3 Cha. 1. c. 6	Lands at Bromfield and Yale, Denbighshire Act 1627	An Act for the establishing of the Estates of the tenants of Bromfeild and Yale in the Countie of Denbigh and of the Tenures Rents and Services thereuppon reserved according to a late Composicion made for the same with the Kings most Excellent Majestie then Prince of Wales.	The whole act.
11 Will. 3. c. 2	Crown Lands (Forfeited Estates) Act 1698	An Act for granting an Aid to His Majesty by Sale of the forfeited and other Estates and Interests in Ireland and by a Land Tax in England for the severall Purposes therein mentioned.	The whole act.
3 & 4 Ann. c. 4	Grant to Duke of Marlborough Act 1704	An Act for the better enabling Her Majesty to grant the Honor and Mannor of Woodstock with the Hundred of Wooton to the Duke of Marlborough and his Heires in Consideration of the eminent Services by him performed to Her Majestye and the Publick.	The whole act.
7 Ann. c. 29	Earl of Clanriccard's Estates Act 1708	An Act for the Relief of the Earl of Clanriccard (lately called Lord Bophin) of the Kingdom of Ireland in relation to his Estate and for the more effectual selling or setting the Estate of the said Earl to Protestants.	The whole act.
28 Geo. 2. c. 54	Dean's Yard, Westminster Act 1755	An Act to enable the Reverend William Markham, Doctor of Laws, and Thomas Salter, Esquire, to build Houses, and open a Square in and upon a certain Piece of Ground called Dean's Yard, Westminster, and several Pieces of Ground contiguous thereto.	The whole act.
31 Geo. 2. c. 16	Crown Lands (Forfeited Estates) Act 1757	An Act to enforce and render more effectual [the Act 25 Geo. 2. c. 41].	The whole act.
2 Geo. 3. c. 17	Crown Lands (Forfeited Estates) Act 1762	An Act for Relief of the Vassals of the several Estates which are or may be annexed to the Crown, by virtue of [the Act 25 Geo. 2. c. 41], and for carrying the Purposes of the said Act more effectually into Execution; and for enforcing and carrying into Execution so much of [the Act 1 Geo. 3. c. 19] as relates to the paying and discharging the Wadsetts affecting the Estate of Lovat.	The whole act.
10 Geo. 3. c. 13	Grant of Manor of Corsham to Paul Methuen Act 1770	An Act for enabling His Majesty to grant the Inheritance in Fee Simple of the Manor of Cosham, in the County of Wilts, with the Rights, Members, and Appurtenances thereof, now held, under a Demise by Letters Patent under the Seal of His Majesty's Court of Exchequer, in Trust for Paul Methuen Esquire, unto the said Paul Methuen, and his Heirs, upon a full and adequate Consideration to be paid for the same.	The whole act.
11 Geo. 3. c. 56	Crown Lands in Meath to Vest in Gerald Fitzgerald Act 1771	An Act for divesting out of the Crown, and to vest in Gerald Fitzgerald of Rathrone, in the County of Meath, in the Kingdom of Ireland, Esquire, and his Heirs, the Reversion in Fee of and in several Lands in Ireland therein mentioned.	The whole act.
12 Geo. 3. c. 19	Crown Lands in Fenchurch Street, London Act 1772	An Act to enable His Majesty to grant certain Houses in Fenchurch Street and Addle Street, in the City of London, escheated to the Crown by the Death of Lieutenant-general John Brown, without Heir, unto Frederick Montagu Esquire, and his Heirs, upon the Trusts therein mentioned.	The whole act.
12 Geo. 3. c. 35	Crown Lands at Richmond, Surrey Act 1772	An Act for enabling Their Majesties to enfranchise Copyhold Lands holden of the Manor of Richmond, in the County of Surrey, and for enabling His Majesty to shut up a Lane leading from Richmond Green to the River Thames, and to sell and exchange certain Lands within the Manors of Richmond and Wimbleton.	The whole act.
12 Geo. 3. c. 43	Crown Lands in Holborn, London Act 1772	An Act for vesting Ely House, in Holbourn, in His Majesty, His Heirs and Successors, and for applying the Purchase-money, with another Sum therein mentioned, in the purchasing of a Freehold Piece of Ground in Dover Street, and in the building and fitting up another House thereon, for the future Residence of the Bishops of Ely, and the Surplus to the Benefit of the See; and for other Purposes therein mentioned.	The whole act.
12 Geo. 3. c. 44	Crown Lands (Grant to James Archibald Stuart) Act 1772	An Act to enable His Majesty to grant the Reversion or Remainder in Fee-simple, now vested in His Majesty, of and in an Annual or Fee-farm Rent of One hundred and thirteen pounds, One of the several Fee-farm Rents granted to the Right Honourable Edward, heretofore Earl of Sandwich, by His late Majesty King Charles the Second, unto the Honourable James Archibald Stuart, and his Heirs, upon a full and adequate Consideration to be given by him, or His Heirs, for the same.	The whole act.
12 Geo. 3. c. 59	Crown Lands at Richmond, Surrey (No. 2) Act 1772	An Act for vesting in His Majesty certain Hereditaments at Richmond, in the County of Surrey, belonging to Catharine Viscountess Fitzwilliam, and held by Lease from the Crown; and for vesting the Freehold and Inheritance of certain Leasehold and Copyhold Hereditaments at Richmond aforesaid in Trustees, and their Heirs, in Trust for the said Catharine Viscountess Fitzwilliam, as a Part of the Compensation for the same, and for other Purposes therein mentioned.	The whole act.
17 Geo. 3. c. 17	Crown Lands at Enfield, Middlesex Act 1776	An Act for dividing the Chase of Enfield, in the County of Middlesex; and for other Purposes therein mentioned.	The whole act. (Note: This act repeal was rescinded by section 2 of the Statute Law (Repeals) Act 1993.)
18 Geo. 3. c. 61	Crown Lands (Forfeited Estates) (Ireland) Act 1778	An Act for repealing certain Provisions in Two Acts [namely, 1 Anne c. 26 and 1 Anne Stat. 2. c. 18].	The whole act.
23 Geo. 3. c. 61	Lands of Earl of Pembroke Act 1783	An Act for vesting in Henry Earl of Pembroke, his Heirs and Assigns, for ever, the Fee-simple and Inheritance of the Hundred of Kynwardston, and certain Lands and Hereditaments in the Parishes of Great Bedwyn and Burbage, in the County of Wilts; and for settling other Lands and Hereditaments in lieu thereof to the same Uses.	The whole act.
25 Geo. 3. c. 98	Crown Lands at North Scotland Yard, Middlesex Act 1785	An Act to enable His Majesty to grant the Inheritance of certain Lands, Tenements, and Hereditaments, situate in or near North Scotland Yard, in the County of Middlesex, in Exchange for the Inheritance of certain Buildings or Barracks, and Land adjoining thereto, and also of certain Ground contiguous to Tinmouth Castle, in the County of Northumberland, belonging to the Duke of Northumberland, or for such further or other Compensation as shall be a full Consideration for the same; and also to impower the said Duke to make such Exchange.	The whole act.
26 Geo. 3. c. 27	Forfeited Estates (Scotland) Act 1786	An Act for authorising the Lord Chief Baron, and remanet Barons of the Court of Exchequer in Scotland, out of the unappropriated Money arising from the forfeited and lately annexed Estates in Scotland, to pay a certain Sum to the Society in Scotland for propagating Christian Knowledge for the Purposes, and under the Conditions therein mentioned.	The whole act.
28 Geo. 3. c. 63	Charles Radcliffe's Estates Act 1788	An Act for charging several Estates in the Counties of Northumberland, Cumberland, and Durham, settled upon the late Charles Radcliffe deceased, for Life, with Remainder to his First and other Sons, in Tail Male, with the Payment of a clear yearly Rent Charge of Two thousand five hundred Pounds, payable to the Grandson of the said Charles Radcliffe, the Right Honourable Anthony James Earl of Newburgh, and the Heirs Male of his Body to be begotten.	The whole act.
30 Geo. 3. c. 51	Crown Lands at Catterick and Tunstall, Yorkshire Act 1790	An Act for divesting out of the Crown the Reversion in Fee of and in certain Hereditaments, heretofore the Estate of Sir Roger Strickland Knight, deceased, in Catterick and Tunstall, in the County of York; and for vesting the same in the several Persons entitled to the said Hereditaments; and for extinguishing and destroying a certain Term of One hundred Years, for which the said Hereditaments were limited in Trust for His late Majesty King George the First, His Heirs and Successors.	The whole act.
32 Geo. 3. c. 24	Crown Lands in Privy Garden, Westminster Act 1792	An Act to repeal so much of [the Act 27 Geo. 3. c. 22] as relates to the Sale of the House in the Privy Garden, heretofore used as an Office for the Commissioners of the Lottery; and to enable His Majesty to grant the said Premises.	The whole act.
33 Geo. 3. c. 46	Crown Lands, Forfeited Estates in Ireland Act 1793	An Act for vesting in His Majesty certain forfeited Estates in Ireland, subject to the Disposition of the Parliament of Ireland.	The whole act.
35 Geo. 3. c. 40	Crown Lands in Northamptonshire, Grant to Earl of Upper Ossory Act 1795	An Act to enable His Majesty to grant to the Right Honourable John Earl of Upper Ossory in the Kingdom of Ireland, Baron Upper Ossory, of Ampthill, in the County of Bedford, His Heirs and Assigns, in Fee Simple, all the Estate, Right, Title, and Interest, remaining in His Majesty, in and upon the Haye or Walk of Farming Woods, in the Forest of Rockingham, in the County of Northampton, and also the Reversion of certain Offices, Rents, and other Hereditaments in the said County of Northampton, to which the said Earl of Upper Ossory is entitled for Three Lives, under a Grant from His present Majesty, upon a full and adequate Consideration to be paid for the same.	The whole act.
36 Geo. 3. c. 62	Crown Lands in Northamptonshire (Grant to Earl of Westmorland) Act 1796	An Act to enable His Majesty to grant to John Earl of Westmorland, His Heirs and Assigns, in Fee Simple, all the Estate, Right, Title, and Interest, remaining in His Majesty in and upon the Hayes or Walks of Sulehay Fermes, and Shortwood, and Morebay, in the Forest of Rockingham, in the County of Northampton, upon a full and adequate Consideration to be paid for the same.	The whole act.
36 Geo. 3. c. 63	Crown Lands in Northamptonshire (Grant to Earl of Exeter) Act 1796	An Act to enable His Majesty to grant to Henry Earl of Exeter, his Heirs and Assigns, in Fee Simple, all the Estate, Right, Title and Interest, remaining in His Majesty in and upon the Haye or Walk of Westhay, in the Forest of Rockingham, in the County of Northampton, upon a full and adequate Consideration to be paid for the same.	The whole act.
37 Geo. 3. c. 47	John Yeldham's Estate Act 1797	An Act for discharging the Estates of John Yeldham Esquire, from certain Demands of the Crown, upon the Conditions therein mentioned.	The whole act.
44 Geo. 3. c. 25	Crown Lands at Byfleet, Weybridge, etc., Surrey Act 1804	An Act to enable His Majesty to grant the Inheritance, in Fee Simple, of certain Manors, Messuages, Lands and Hereditaments, in the Parishes of Byfleet, Weybridge, Walton, Walton Leigh, and Chertsey, in the County of Surrey, to His Royal Highness Frederick Duke of York and Albany, for a valuable Consideration.	The whole act.
45 Geo. 3. c. 116	Crown Lands at Shilston Bay, Devon Act 1805	An Act for enabling His Majesty to grant a certain Creek, called Chelson Bay, otherwise Shilston Bay, in or near the Parish of Plympton Saint Mary, in the County of Devon; and for vesting the same, for a valuable Consideration, in the Right Honourable Lord Boringdon, and his Heirs.	The whole act.
47 Geo. 3 Sess. 2. c. 77	Crown Lands at Egham, Exchange King and David Jebb Act 1807	An Act for confirming Articles of Agreement for an Exchange of Lands between His Majesty and David Jebb Esquire, in the Parish of Egham, in the County of Surrey.	The whole act.
52 Geo. 3. c. 124	Vesting in Crown of Lands at Sandhurst Act 1812	An Act for vesting in His Majesty, His Heirs and Successors, certain Lands or Grounds, formerly Part of the Wastes of the Manor of Sandhurst, in the County of Berks, freed and discharged of Commonable and other Rights.	The whole act.
55 Geo. 3. c. 188	Grant of Feu Duties to John Francis Erskine Act 1815	An Act for enabling His Majesty to grant to John Francis Erskine of Mar Esquire, and his Heirs and Assigns, the Feu Duties and Quit Rents arising in the Lordship of Stirling, in Discharge of a Debt of greater Value created upon the said Feu Duties by a Grant from His Majesty King George the First.	The whole act.
57 Geo. 3. c. 129	Manor of Rialton and Retraighe Act 1817	An Act for vesting in His Majesty a certain Part of the Open Commons and Waste Lands within the Manor or Royalty of Rialton and Retraighe alias Reterth in the Parish of Saint Columb Major, in the County of Cornwall.	The whole act.
4 Geo. 4. c. 75	Land at Kew Green, Surrey Act 1823	An Act for enabling His Majesty to inclose Part of Kew Green, and for dividing and extinguishing Rights of Common over certain Lands in the Parish of Kew, in the County of Surrey.	The whole act.
1 & 2 Will. 4. c. 50	Fresh Wharf, London Act 1831	An Act to enable the Commissioners of His Majesty's Treasury to make a Conveyance of Fresh Wharf in the City of London.	The whole act.
5 & 6 Vict. c. 78	Exchange, Crown and Eton College Act 1842	An Act for effecting an Exchange between Her Majesty and the Provost and College of Eton.	The whole act.
6 & 7 Vict. c. 19	Thatched House Court and Little St. James's Street, Westminster Act 1843	An Act to empower the Commissioners of Her Majesty's Woods to appropriate to Building Purposes the Area of Thatched House Court, and to widen and improve Little Saint James's Street, in the Parish of Saint James Westminster.	The whole act.
8 & 9 Vict. c. 104	Darby Court, Westminster Act 1845	An Act to empower the Commissioners of Her Majesty's Woods to appropriate to building Purposes the Area of Darby Court, in the Parish of Saint James Westminster.	The whole act.
21 & 22 Vict. c. 36	Lands of the Commissioners for the Exhibition of 1851 Act 1858	An Act for releasing the Lands of the Commissioners for the Exhibition of 1851, upon the Repayment of Monies granted in aid of their Funds.	The whole act.

==== Part XV: Railways ====
Part XV — Railways
Citation	Short title	Description	Extent of repeal
31 Geo. 2. c. 22 Pr.	Middleton Railway Act 1757	An Act for establishing Agreements, made between Charles Brandling Esquire, and other Persons, Proprietors of Lands, for laying down a Waggon Way, in order for the better supplying the Town and Neighbourhood of Leeds, in the County of York, with Coals.	The whole act.
19 Geo. 3. c. 11	Leeds Coal Supply Act 1779	An Act for rendering more beneficial [the Act 31 Geo. 2. c. 22].	The whole act.
33 Geo. 3. c. 86	Leeds Coal Supply Act 1793	An Act for amending and enlarging the Powers of Two Acts [namely, 31 Geo. 2. c. 22 and 19 Geo. 3. c. 11].	The whole act.
43 Geo. 3. c. xii	Leeds Coal Supply Act 1803	An Act for amending and enlarging the Powers of several Acts [namely, 31 Geo. 2. c. 22, 19 Geo. 3. c. 11 and 33 Geo. 3. c. 86].	The whole act.
5 & 6 Vict. c. 55	Railway Regulation Act 1842	Railway Regulation Act 1842.	Section 20, including that section as applied by any other enactment.
46 & 47 Vict. c. 34	Cheap Trains Act 1883	Cheap Trains Act 1883.	The whole act, including the Act as applied by any other enactment.
11 & 12 Geo. 5. c. 55	Railways Act 1921	Railways Act 1921.	Section 14. In section 68, in subsection (1) the proviso, and subsection (3). Section 70(2). In section 71(1), the proviso. Section 86(2). Schedules 3 and 9.
13 & 14 Geo. 5. c. 27	Railway Fires Act (1905) Amendment Act 1923	Railway Fires Act (1905) Amendment Act 1923.	Section 4.
12, 13 & 14 Geo. 6. c. 11	Railway and Canal Commission (Abolition) Act 1949	Railway and Canal Commission (Abolition) Act 1949.	Sections 6 and 7.
1 & 2 Eliz. 2. c. 13	Transport Act 1953	Transport Act 1953.	Section 24.
10 & 11 Eliz. 2. c. 46	Transport Act 1962	Transport Act 1962.	In section 57(3)(b), the words "and section twenty-four of the Transport Act 1953".

==== Part XVI: Religious Disabilities ====
Part XVI — Religious Disabilities
Citation	Short title	Extent of repeal
31 Geo. 3. c. 32	Roman Catholic Relief Act 1791	The whole act.
10 Geo. 4. c. 7	Roman Catholic Relief Act 1829	The preamble. Sections 2, 5 and 11. In section 16, the words from "or any office", where they first occur, to "within this realm". Sections 23 and 24.
30 & 31 Vict. c. 75	Office and Oath Act 1867	The whole act.

==== Part XVII: Miscellaneous ====
Part XVII — Miscellaneous
Citation	Short title	Description	Extent of repeal
33 Hen. 8. c. 35	Gloucester Water Supply Act 1541	The Bill for the Conduyettes at Gloucester.	The whole act.
31 Geo. 2. c. 25	Westminster Corn and Grain Market Act 1757	An Act for establishing a free Market for the Sale of Corn and Grain within the City or Liberty of Westminster.	The whole act.
32 Geo. 2. c. 61	Manchester (School Mills) Act 1758	An Act for discharging the Inhabitants of the Town of Manchester, in the County Palatine of Lancaster, from the Custom of grinding their Corn and Grain, except Malt, at certain Water Corn Mills in the said Town, called the School Mills; and for making a proper Recompence to the Feoffees for such Mills.	The whole act.
17 Geo. 3. c. 24	York Buildings Company (Sale of Scottish Estates) Act 1776	An Act for expediting the Sale of Estates in Scotland belonging to the York Buildings Company, for the Relief of their Creditors.	The whole act.
24 Geo. 3. Sess. 1. c. 19	Isle of Wight (Carriage Rates) Act 1783	An Act for settling the Rates for the Carriage of Passengers and Goods for Hire to and from the Isle of Wight.	The whole act.
39 Geo. 3. c. 34	Partridges Act 1799	Partridges Act 1799.	The whole act.
1 & 2 Vict. c. 43	Dean Forest (Mines) Act 1838	Dean Forest (Mines) Act 1838.	In section 56, the words from "subject to" to "signified as aforesaid".
32 & 33 Vict. c. 10	Colonial Prisoners Removal Act 1869	Colonial Prisoners Removal Act 1869.	In section 2, the words "or within British India".
35 & 36 Vict. c. 94	Licensing Act 1872	Licensing Act 1872.	Section 39.
38 & 39 Vict. c. 55	Public Health Act 1875	Public Health Act 1875.	In Schedule 5, in Part III, in the paragraph relating to section 35 of the Act 35 & 36 Vict. c. 79 the words from "under" (where it first occurs) to "same, and"; and the paragraphs relating to section 37 of that Act.
52 & 53 Vict. c. 30	Board of Agriculture Act 1889	Board of Agriculture Act 1889.	In Part II of Schedule 1, the entries relating to the London (City) Tithes Act 1879, the Commonable Rights Compensation Act 1882, the Allotments Act 1887, the Public Schools (Eton College Property) Act 1873, the Improvement of Lands (Ecclesiastical Benefices) Act 1884 and the Settled Lands Acts (Amendment) Act 1887.
63 & 64 Vict. c. 15	Burial Act 1900	Burial Act 1900.	The whole act.
2 Edw. 7. c. 8	Cremation Act 1902	Cremation Act 1902.	In sections 2 and 3, the definition of "burial authority".
8 & 9 Geo. 5. c. 59	Termination of the Present War (Definition) Act 1918	Termination of the Present War (Definition) Act 1918.	The whole act.
9 & 10 Geo. 5. c. 20	Scottish Board of Health Act 1919	Scottish Board of Health Act 1919.	In Schedule 1, paragraphs 2 and 3.
10 & 11 Geo. 5. c. 5	War Emergency Laws (Continuance) Act 1920	War Emergency Laws (Continuance) Act 1920.	The whole act.
15 & 16 Geo. 5. c. 19	Trustee Act 1925	Trustee Act 1925.	Section 69(3). Schedule 1.
15 & 16 Geo. 5. c. 61	Allotments Act 1925	Allotments Act 1925.	Section 3(2).
24 & 25 Geo. 5. c. 36	Petroleum (Production) Act 1934	Petroleum (Production) Act 1934.	In the Schedule, the entries relating to the licences dated 16th December 1930 and 20th July 1931.
10 & 11 Geo. 6. c. 39	Statistics of Trade Act 1947	Statistics of Trade Act 1947.	Section 19(3).
14 & 15 Geo. 6. c. 39	Common Informers Act 1951	Common Informers Act 1951.	In the Schedule, the entry relating to the Partridges Act 1799.
15 & 16 Geo. 6 & 1 Eliz. 2. c. 31	Cremation Act 1952	Cremation Act 1952.	Section 4.
4 & 5 Eliz. 2. c. 19	Friendly Societies Act 1955	Friendly Societies Act 1955.	Section 5.
4 & 5 Eliz. 2. c. 48	Sugar Act 1956	Sugar Act 1956.	Section 18(7) and (8). Section 34. In section 35, subsection (1), and in subsection (2) the definition of "the Government".
6 & 7 Eliz. 2. c. 70	Slaughterhouses Act 1958	Slaughterhouses Act 1958.	The whole act.
1964 c. 26	Licensing Act 1964	Licensing Act 1964.	In Schedule 14, paragraphs 5 and 7.
1965 c. 36	Gas Act 1965	Gas Act 1965.	In section 28(4), the proviso. Section 31(2).
1965 c. 56	Compulsory Purchase Act 1965	Compulsory Purchase Act 1965.	In Schedule 6, the entry relating to the Local Government Act 1933.
1971 c. 17	Industry Act 1971	Industry Act 1971.	Section 1. In section 3(2), the words "1 or" and paragraph (a). Schedule 1. In Schedule 2, Part I, and in Part II the entries relating to the House of Commons Disqualification Act 1957 and the Transport Act 1968.
1971 c. 40	Fire Precautions Act 1971	Fire Precautions Act 1971.	In section 28(5), the proviso.
1971 c. 66	Friendly Societies Act 1971	Friendly Societies Act 1971.	Section 11(6).
1976 c. 16	Statute Law (Repeals) Act 1976	Statute Law (Repeals) Act 1976.	In Schedule 2, in Part I, in the entry relating to the Inebriates Act 1898, the words "and the Licensing (Scotland) Act 1959, section 160".
1976 c. 66	Licensing (Scotland) Act 1976	Licensing (Scotland) Act 1976.	In section 50(2), the words from "and an application" onwards.
1977 c. 49	National Health Service Act 1977	National Health Service Act 1977.	In Schedule 14, in paragraph 13(1)(b), the word "48". In Schedule 15, paragraphs 11 and 68.

=== Consequential amendments ===
Schedule 2 to the act made amendments to the School Sites Act 1841 (4 & 5 Vict. c. 38), the School Grants Act 1855 (18 & 19 Vict. c. 131), and the Public Records Act (Northern Ireland) 1923 (c. 20 (N.I.)).

=== Short titles ===
Section 2 of, and paragraph 1 of schedule 3 to, the act authorised the citation by short titles of three acts passed between 1554 and 1854.

Three acts passed between 1554 and 1854
Citation	Short title	Title
1 Mar. Sess. 3. c. 4	Lord Steward Act 1554	An Acte for thestablishing of thoffice of the L. Steward of the Quenes Majesties most Honourable Housholde.
52 Geo. 3. c. 123	Duchy of Cornwall Act 1812	An Act for amending an enlarging the Powers of an Act passed in the Fiftieth Year of His Present Majesty, to enable His Royal Highness the Prince of Wales to grant Leases of certain Lands and Premises called Prince's Meadows, in the Parish of Lambeth, in the County of Surrey, Parcel of His said Royal Highness's Duchy of Cornwall, for the purpose of building thereon.
17 & 18 Vict. c. 93	Duchy of Cornwall Office Act 1854	An Act for the Exchange of the Office of Somerset House of the Duchy of Cornwall for an Office to be erected in Pimlico on the Hereditary Possessions of the Crown.

Section 2 of, and paragraph 2 of schedule 3 to, the act amended the citation of the Clerk of Parliaments Act 1824 (5 Geo. 4. c. 82) in the Short Titles Act 1896 (59 & 60 Vict. c. 14) to become the Clerk of the Parliaments Act 1824.

== Subsequent developments ==
The repeal of the Enfield Chase Act 1777 (17 Geo. 3. c. 17) was reversed by the Statute Law (Repeals) Act 1993.

Section 2 of, and schedule 3 to, the act was repealed by section 1(1) of, and part IV of schedule 1 to, the Statute Law (Repeals) Act 1995, which came into force on 8 November 1995.

Section 1(1) of, in section 3(2), the words "or the Isle of Man", and schedule 1 to, the act were repealed by section 1(1) of, and group 2 of part IX of schedule 1 to, the Statute Law (Repeals) Act 1998, which came into force on 19 November 1998. The orders in council made under section 3(2) have lapsed because of the repeal made to that section by the 1998 act.

== See also ==
- Statute Law (Repeals) Act
