= List of acts of the Parliament of England from 1523 =

This is a list of acts of the Parliament of England for the year 1523.

For acts passed during the period 1707–1800, see the list of acts of the Parliament of Great Britain. See also the list of acts of the Parliament of Scotland, and the list of acts of the Parliament of Ireland.

For acts passed from 1801 onwards, see the list of acts of the Parliament of the United Kingdom. For acts of the devolved parliaments and assemblies in the United Kingdom, see the list of acts of the Scottish Parliament, the list of acts of the Northern Ireland Assembly, and the list of acts and measures of Senedd Cymru; see also the list of acts of the Parliament of Northern Ireland.

For medieval statutes, etc. that are not considered to be acts of Parliament, see the list of English statutes.

See also the List of ordinances and acts of the Parliament of England, 1642–1660 for ordinances and acts passed by the Long Parliament and other bodies without royal assent, and which were not considered to be valid legislation following the Restoration in 1660.

The number shown after each act's title is its chapter number. Acts are cited using this number, preceded by the years of the reign during which the relevant parliamentary session was held; thus the Union with Ireland Act 1800 is cited as "39 & 40 Geo. 3. c. 67", meaning the 67th act passed during the session that started in the 39th year of the reign of George III and which finished in the 40th year of that reign. The modern convention is to use Arabic numerals in citations (thus "41 Geo. 3" rather than "41 Geo. III"). Acts of the last session of the Parliament of Great Britain and the first session of the Parliament of the United Kingdom are both cited as "41 Geo. 3".

Acts passed by the Parliament of England did not have a short title; however, some of these acts have subsequently been given a short title by acts of the Parliament of the United Kingdom, such as the Short Titles Act 1896 (59 & 60 Vict. c. 14).

Acts passed by the Parliament of England were deemed to have come into effect on the first day of the session in which they were passed. Because of this, the years given in the list below may in fact be the year before a particular act was passed.

== 14 & 15 Hen. 8 ==
The 4th Parliament of King Henry VIII which met at Blackfriars Priory, City of London and at Westminster from 15 April 1523 until 13 August 1523.

This session was also traditionally cited as 14 & 15 H. 8.

Note that cc. 15, 16–19 were traditionally cited as private acts cc. 5 and 6, 1-4.

Short title	Citation	Royal assent
Long title
Cloths Act 1523 (repealed)	14 & 15 Hen. 8. c. 1	13 August 1523
The Act concerning the conveying, transporting and carrying of Broad White Woollen Cloths out of this Realm. (Repealed by Repeal of Acts Concerning Importation Act 1822 (3 Geo. 4. c. 41))
Aliens Act 1523 (repealed)	14 & 15 Hen. 8. c. 2	13 August 1523
The Act concerning the taking of Apprentices by Strangers. (Repealed by Repeal of Obsolete Statutes Act 1856 (19 & 20 Vict. c. 64))
Worsteds (Great Yarmouth) Act 1523 (repealed)	14 & 15 Hen. 8. c. 3	13 August 1523
The Act concerning the draping of Worsteds, Sayes and Stamins, for the Town of Great Yarmouth. (Repealed by Repeal of Obsolete Statutes Act 1856 (19 & 20 Vict. c. 64))
Customs Act 1523 (repealed)	14 & 15 Hen. 8. c. 4	13 August 1523
An Act for Payment of Custom. (Repealed by Repeal of Acts Concerning Importation Act 1822 (3 Geo. 4. c. 41))
Physicians Act 1523 or the Privileges and Authority of Physicians in London Act 1523 (repealed)	14 & 15 Hen. 8. c. 5	13 August 1523
An Act concerning Physicians. (Repealed by Medical Act 1860 (23 & 24 Vict. c. 66) and Statute Law Revision Act 1948 (11 & 12 Geo. 6. c. 62))
Weald of Kent Highways (Diversion) Act 1523 (repealed)	14 & 15 Hen. 8. c. 6	13 August 1523
An Act for George Guldeford to lay out a new Way. (Repealed by Statute Law Revision Act 1948 (11 & 12 Geo. 6. c. 62))
Cross-bows Act 1523 (repealed)	14 & 15 Hen. 8. c. 7	13 August 1523
The Act for shooting in Cross Bows and Hand Guns. (Repealed by Statute Law Revision Act 1863 (26 & 27 Vict. c. 125))
Six Clerks in Chancery Act 1523 (repealed)	14 & 15 Hen. 8. c. 8	13 August 1523
An Act that the Six Clerks of the Chancery may marry. (Repealed by Statute Law Revision Act 1863 (26 & 27 Vict. c. 125))
Cordwainers Act 1523 (repealed)	14 & 15 Hen. 8. c. 9	13 August 1523
An Act concerning Cordwainers. (Repealed by Statute Law Revision Act 1863 (26 & 27 Vict. c. 125))
Killing Hares Act 1523 (repealed)	14 & 15 Hen. 8. c. 10	13 August 1523
An Act against tracing of Hares. (Repealed by Game Act 1831 (1 & 2 Will. 4. c. 32))
Cloths (No. 2) Act 1523 (repealed)	14 & 15 Hen. 8. c. 11	13 August 1523
An Act for the Clothiers in Suffolk. (Repealed by Statute Law Revision Act 1863 (26 & 27 Vict. c. 125))
Coining Act 1523 (repealed)	14 & 15 Hen. 8. c. 12	13 August 1523
An Act concerning coining of Money. (Repealed by Repeal of Obsolete Statutes Act 1856 (19 & 20 Vict. c. 64))
Port of Southampton Act 1523 (repealed)	14 & 15 Hen. 8. c. 13	13 August 1523
An Act for the Haven or Port of Southampton. (Repealed by Salmon Fishery Act 1861 (24 & 25 Vict. c. 109))
Service in War Act 1523 (repealed)	14 & 15 Hen. 8. c. 14	13 August 1523
An Act of Privilege for such Persons as are in the King's Wars. (Repealed by Statute Law Revision Act 1863 (26 & 27 Vict. c. 125))
Surveyors of Crown Lands, etc. Act 1523 (repealed)	14 & 15 Hen. 8. c. 15 (Note: This is the citation in The Statutes of the Realm.); 14 & 15 Hen. 8. cc. 5 Pr., 6 Pr. (Note: This is the citation in The Statutes at Large.)	13 August 1523
An Acte for the Kyngs Generall Surveyours. (Repealed by Crown Debts Act 1541 (33 Hen. 8. c. 39))
Subsidy Act 1523 (repealed)	14 & 15 Hen. 8. c. 16; 14 & 15 Hen. 8. c. 1 Pr.	13 August 1523
An Act for a subsidy to be granted to the King. (Repealed by Statute Law Revision Act 1863 (26 & 27 Vict. c. 125))
Act of General Pardon 1523 (repealed)	14 & 15 Hen. 8. c. 17; 14 & 15 Hen. 8. c. 2 Pr.	13 August 1523
An Act for the King's general pardon. (Repealed by Statute Law Revision Act 1863 (26 & 27 Vict. c. 125))
Royal Manor of Beaulieu Act 1523 (repealed)	14 & 15 Hen. 8. c. 18; 14 & 15 Hen. 8. c. 3 Pr.	13 August 1523
An Act for uniting divers manors to the King's manor royal of Beaulieu. (Repealed by Statute Law (Repeals) Act 1978 (c. 45))
Expenses of King's Household Act 1523 (repealed)	14 & 15 Hen. 8. c. 19; 14 & 15 Hen. 8. c. 4 Pr.	13 August 1523
An Act concerning the expences of the King's houshold. (Repealed by Statute Law Revision Act 1863 (26 & 27 Vict. c. 125))
Attainder of Edward late Duke of Buckingham Act 1523 (repealed)	14 & 15 Hen. 8. c. 20; 14 & 15 Hen. 8. c. 7 Pr.	13 August 1523
Thacte of Atteynder of Edward late Duke of Buckingham. (Repealed by Statute Law (Repeals) Act 1977 (c. 18))
Act of Auctorite 1523 (repealed)	14 & 15 Hen. 8. c. 21; 14 & 15 Hen. 8. c. 8 Pr.	13 August 1523
Thacte of Autorite. (Note: King's power to reverse attainders.) (Repealed by Statute Law (Repeals) Act 1977 (c. 18))
Allowance to Duchess of Buckingham Act 1523 (repealed)	14 & 15 Hen. 8. c. 22; 14 & 15 Hen. 8. c. 9 Pr.	13 August 1523
An Act concerning the duchess of Buckingham. (Repealed by Statute Law Revision Act 1953 (2 & 3 Eliz. 2. c. 5))
Restitution of Henry Stafford Act 1523 (repealed)	14 & 15 Hen. 8. c. 23; 14 & 15 Hen. 8. c. 10 Pr.	13 August 1523
An Acte for Henry Stafford and Ursula his Wyfe. (Repealed by Statute Law (Repeals) Act 1977 (c. 18))
Sale of Land to Sir William Compton Act 1523 (repealed)	14 & 15 Hen. 8. c. 24; 14 & 15 Hen. 8. c. 11 Pr.	13 August 1523
An Act for Sir William Compton for his more sure enjoying of certain lands. (Repealed by Statute Law (Repeals) Act 1978 (c. 45))
Sale of Land to Thomas Kitson Act 1523 (repealed)	14 & 15 Hen. 8. c. 25; 14 & 15 Hen. 8. c. 12 Pr.	13 August 1523
An Act for Thomas Kitson citizen and merchant of London. (Repealed by Statute Law (Repeals) Act 1978 (c. 45))
Sale of Land to Sir Richard Sacheverell Act 1523 (repealed)	14 & 15 Hen. 8. c. 26; 14 & 15 Hen. 8. c. 13 Pr.	13 August 1523
An Act for Sir Richard Sacheverell knight. (Repealed by Statute Law (Repeals) Act 1978 (c. 45))
Grant to Lord Marney Act 1523 (repealed)	14 & 15 Hen. 8. c. 27; 14 & 15 Hen. 8. c. 14 Pr.	13 August 1523
An Act for Sir John Marney, lord Marney. (Repealed by Statute Law (Repeals) Act 1978 (c. 45))
Tenure by Castle Ward Service (as of Dover Castle) Act 1523 (repealed)	14 & 15 Hen. 8. c. 28; 14 & 15 Hen. 8. c. 15 Pr.	13 August 1523
An Act that such manors as were formerly holden of the castle of Dover in Kent, should be holden of the King. (Repealed by Statute Law Revision Act 1948 (11 & 12 Geo. 6. c. 62))
Saving for the Merchants of the Hanse Act 1523 (repealed)	14 & 15 Hen. 8. c. 29; 14 & 15 Hen. 8. c. 16 Pr.	13 August 1523
An Act containing a provision for the merchants of the Hanse of Almayne. (Repealed by Statute Law Revision Act 1948 (11 & 12 Geo. 6. c. 62))
Grant to Earl of Northumberland Act 1523 (repealed)	14 & 15 Hen. 8. c. 30; 14 & 15 Hen. 8. c. 17 Pr.	13 August 1523
An Act for the earl of Northumberland. (Repealed by Statute Law (Repeals) Act 1978 (c. 45))
Grants to Sir Andrew Windsor and Anthony Windsor Act 1523 (repealed)	14 & 15 Hen. 8. c. 31; 14 & 15 Hen. 8. c. 18 Pr.	13 August 1523
An Act for Sir Andrew Windsoure and Anthony Windsoure. (Repealed by Statute Law (Repeals) Act 1978 (c. 45))
Sir H. Wyatt's Lands in Kent Disgavelled Act 1523 (repealed)	14 & 15 Hen. 8. c. 32; 14 & 15 Hen. 8. c. 19 Pr.	13 August 1523
An Act for Sir Henry Wyatt, knight. (Repealed by Statute Law Revision Act 1948 (11 & 12 Geo. 6. c. 62))
Grant to Earl of Shrewsbury Act 1523 (repealed)	14 & 15 Hen. 8. c. 33; 14 & 15 Hen. 8. c. 20 Pr.	13 August 1523
An Act for George earl of Shrewsbury. (Repealed by Statute Law (Repeals) Act 1978 (c. 45))
Jointure of Elizabeth Talboys Act 1523 (repealed)	14 & 15 Hen. 8. c. 34; 14 & 15 Hen. 8. c. 21 Pr.	13 August 1523
An Act for the jointure of Elizabeth Taylboys, wife of Gilbert Taylboys. (Repealed by Statute Law (Repeals) Act 1978 (c. 45))
Keeper of Common Bench Records (Tenure of Office) Act 1523 (repealed)	14 & 15 Hen. 8. c. 35; 14 & 15 Hen. 8. c. 22	13 August 1523
An Act that George Roll clerk, and keeper of the King's records of the common bench at Westminster, shall hold his place during life. (Repealed by Statute Law Revision Act 1948 (11 & 12 Geo. 6. c. 62))

=== Sources ===
- "14° & 15° Hen. VIII". The Statutes of the Realm. Vol. 3: 1509 to 1547. pp. 206–281 – via HathiTrust.
- "14° & 15° Hen. VIII". The Statutes of the Realm. Vol. 3: 1509 to 1547. pp. 206–281 – via Google Books.
- "Anno xiv. & xv. Henrici VIII". The Statutes at Large. Vol. 4 - 1 Richard III to 31 Henry VIII - 1483-4 to 1539. pp. 145–164 – via Internet Archive.
- "Anno xiv. & xv. Henrici VIII". The Statutes at Large. Vol. 4 - 1 Richard III to 31 Henry VIII - 1483-4 to 1539. pp. 145–164 – via Internet Archive.
- "Anno xiv. & xv. Henrici VIII". The Statutes at Large. Vol. 4 - 1 Richard III to 31 Henry VIII - 1483-4 to 1539. pp. 145–164 – via Internet Archive.
- Journal of the House of Lords. Vol. 1: 1509-1577. London: His Majesty's Stationery Office. 1830 – via British History Online.
- Chronological Table of and Index to the Statutes. Vol. 1: To the End of the Session 59 Vict. Sess. 2 (1895) (13th ed.). London: Her Majesty's Stationery Office. 1896. p. 45 – via Google Books.
- Chronological Table of the Statutes: Covering the Period from 1235 to the End of 1971. London: Her Majesty's Stationery Office. 1972. pp. 40–41. ISBN 978-0-11-840096-1 – via Google Books.

== See also ==
- List of acts of the Parliament of England
