= Duchy of Cornwall Act 1812 =

Act of the Parliament of the United Kingdom

Duchy of Cornwall Act 1812 (Note: The citation of this act by this short title was authorised by section 2 of, and schedule 3 to, the Statute Law (Repeals) Act 1978.)
- Act of Parliament
- Parliament of the United Kingdom
- Long title: An Act for amending and enlarging the Powers of an Act passed in the Fiftieth Year of His Present Majesty, to enable his Royal Highness the Prince of Wales to grant Leases of certain Lands and Premises called Prince's Meadows, in the Parish of Lambeth, in the County of Surrey, Parcel of His said Royal Highness's Duchy of Cornwall, for the purpose of building thereon.
- Citation: 52 Geo. 3. c. 123
- Territorial extent: United Kingdom

Dates
- Royal assent: 13 July 1812
- Commencement: 13 July 1812 (Note: The Acts of Parliament (Commencement) Act 1793.)
Other legislation
| Amends | Duchy of Cornwall Act 1810 |
| Amended by | Statute Law (Repeals) Act 1978 |

Status: Partially repealed

Text of statute as originally enacted

The Duchy of Cornwall Act 1812 (52 Geo. 3. c. 123) is an act of the Parliament of the United Kingdom. It is a public general act. It was omitted from the third revised edition of the statutes because of its local and personal nature.

As of 2026, the act remains partly in force in the United Kingdom

== Subsequent developments ==
The whole act was repealed by section 1(1) of, and part IV of schedule 1 to, the Statute Law (Repeals) Act 1978, which came into force on 31 July 1978.
