= Duchies of Lancaster and Cornwall (Accounts) Act 1838 =

Act of the Parliament of the United Kingdom

Duchies of Lancaster and Cornwall (Accounts) Act 1838 (Note: The citation of this act by this short title was authorised by section 5 of, and the second schedule to, the Statute Law Revision Act 1948. Due to the repeal of those provisions, it is now authorised by section 19(2) of the Interpretation Act 1978.)
- Act of Parliament
- Parliament of the United Kingdom
- Long title: An Act to revive and continue an Act of the First and Second Years of His late Majesty, to enable His Majesty to make Leases, Copies, and Grants of Offices, Lands, and Hereditaments Parcel of the Duchy of Cornwall or annexed to the same; and to make Provision for rendering to Parliament annual Accounts of the Receipts and Disbursements of the Duchies of Cornwall and Lancaster. (Note: These words are printed against this act in the second column of the second schedule to the Statute Law Revision Act 1948, which is headed "Title".)
- Citation: 1 & 2 Vict. c. 101
- Territorial extent: United Kingdom

Dates
- Royal assent: 14 August 1838
- Commencement: 14 August 1838 (Note: The Acts of Parliament (Commencement) Act 1793.)
Other legislation
| Amends | Duchy of Cornwall Lands Act 1831 |
| Amended by | Statute Law (Repeals) Act 1978; Duchy of Cornwall Management Act 1982 |

Status: Amended

Text of statute as originally enacted

Revised text of statute as amended

Text of the Duchies of Lancaster and Cornwall (Accounts) Act 1838 as in force today (including any amendments) within the United Kingdom, from legislation.gov.uk.

The Duchies of Lancaster and Cornwall (Accounts) Act 1838 (1 & 2 Vict. c. 101) is an act of the Parliament of the United Kingdom.

Section 2 of the act requires the Duchy of Cornwall and the Duchy of Lancaster to present their annual accounts to the Lords Commissioners of the Treasury and to present them to both Houses of Parliament.

As of 2026, the act remains partly in force in the United Kingdom.

== Subsequent developments ==
In the title, the words from "revive" to "and to", the preamble to, and section 1 of, the act were repealed by section 1(1) of, and part IV of schedule 1 to, the Statute Law (Repeals) Act 1978, which came into force on 31 July 1978.

An Act to ~~revive and continue an Act of the First and Second Years of His late Majesty, to enable His Majesty to make Leases, Copies, and Grants of Offices, Lands, and Hereditaments Parcel of the Duchy of Cornwall or annexed to the same; and to~~ make Provision for rendering to Parliament annual Accounts of the Receipts and Disbursement of the Duchies of Cornwall and Lancaster.

Section 2 of the act was amended by section 9(1) of the Duchy of Cornwall Management Act 1982, which came into force on 28 October 1982. The 1982 act adjusted the deadline for the presentation of the accounts from the Duchy of Cornwall from being one calendar month after Parliament first meets each year to a fixed annual date of 30 June.
