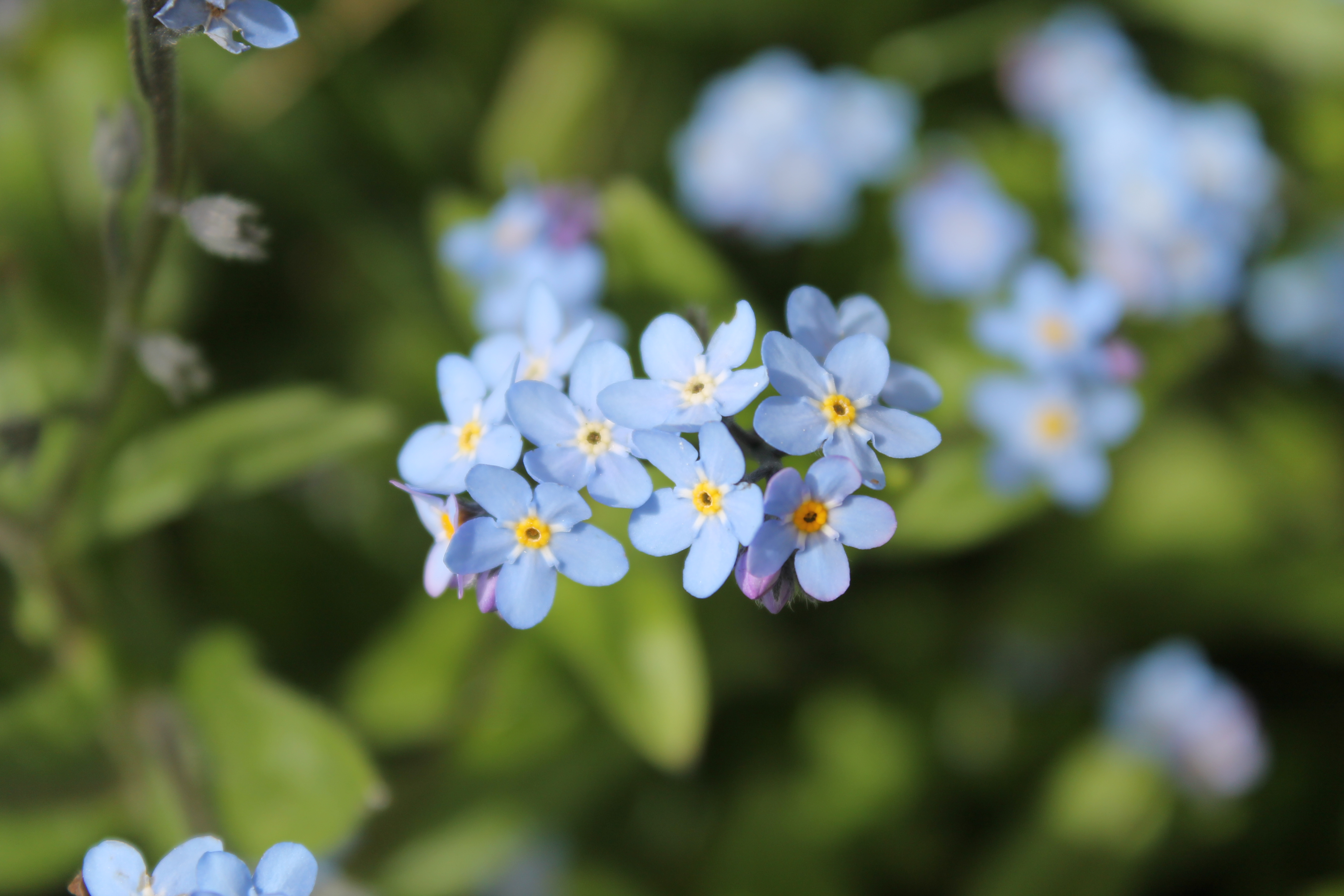

Scientific classification
- Kingdom: Plantae
- Clade: Embryophytes
- Clade: Tracheophytes
- Clade: Spermatophytes
- Clade: Angiosperms
- Clade: Eudicots
- Clade: Asterids
- Order: Boraginales
- Family: Boraginaceae
- Genus: Myosotis
- Species: M. sylvatica

Binomial name
- Myosotis sylvatica Ehrh.

= Myosotis sylvatica =

Species of flowering plant in the borage family

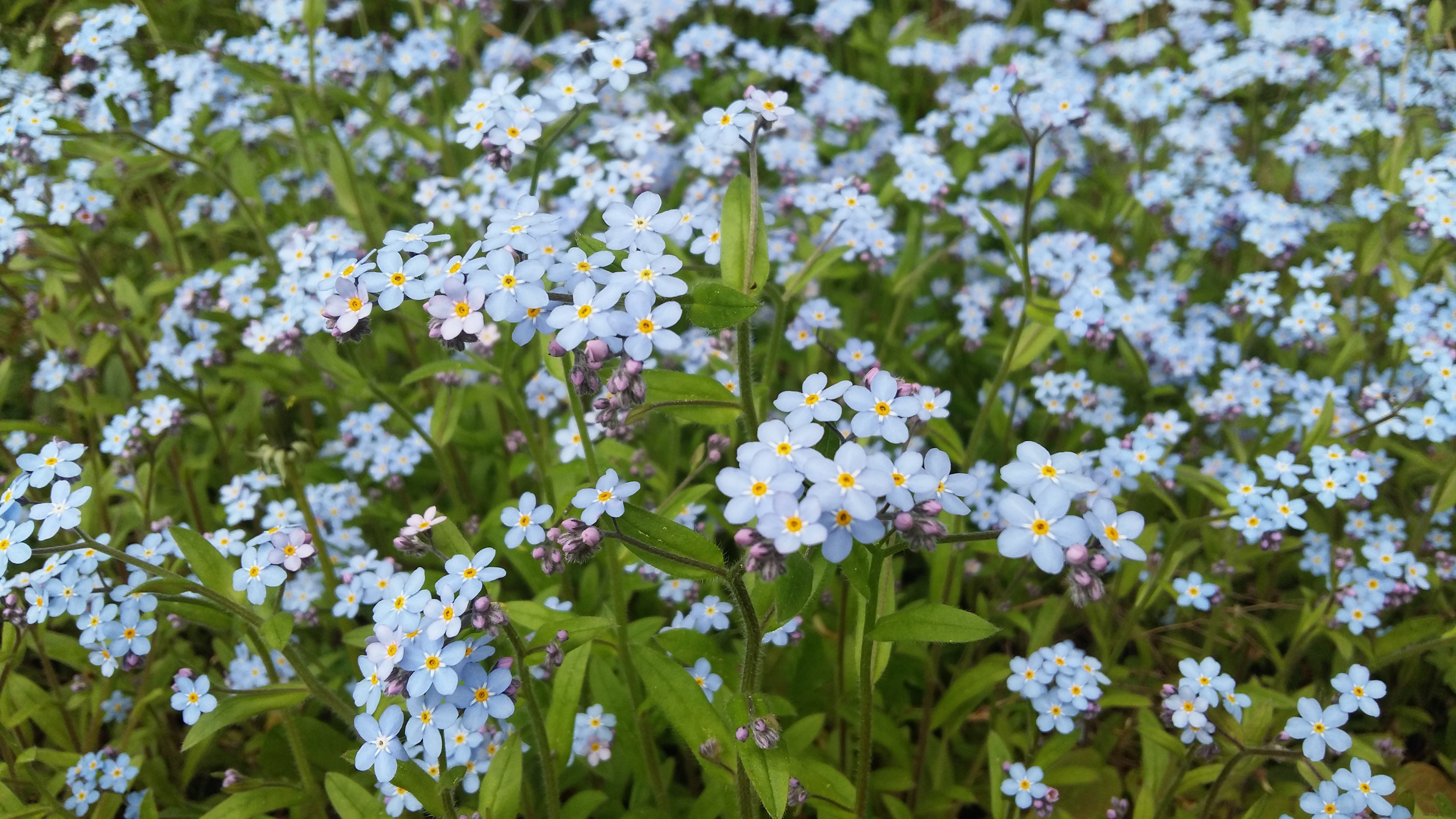

Myosotis sylvatica, the wood forget-me-not or woodland forget-me-not, is a species of flowering plant in the family Boraginaceae, native to Europe. This spring-flowering plant and its cultivars, typically with blue flowers, are the familiar forget-me-nots of gardens.

== Description ==
It is a short-lived herbaceous perennial plant, growing to 12–30 cm (5–12 in) tall by 15 cm (6 in) wide, with hairy leaves and a profusion of flowers with petals longer than their tube, pink in bud then opening disc-shaped, intensely sky-blue with yellow centres in spring.

Stace (2011) describes this plant as having the following characteristics:

- Upright, to 50 cm; softly hairy, with hairs at more-or-less right-angles to the main stem.
- Flowers sky-blue, to 6–10 mm across, flat in profile; sepal tube with hooked hairs; April–July.
- Mature fruit dark brown, shiny.
- Mature calyx on spreading stalks longer than sepal tube; calyx teeth spreading to expose the ripe fruit.
- Basal leaves stalked, in a rosette; upper leaves not stalked.
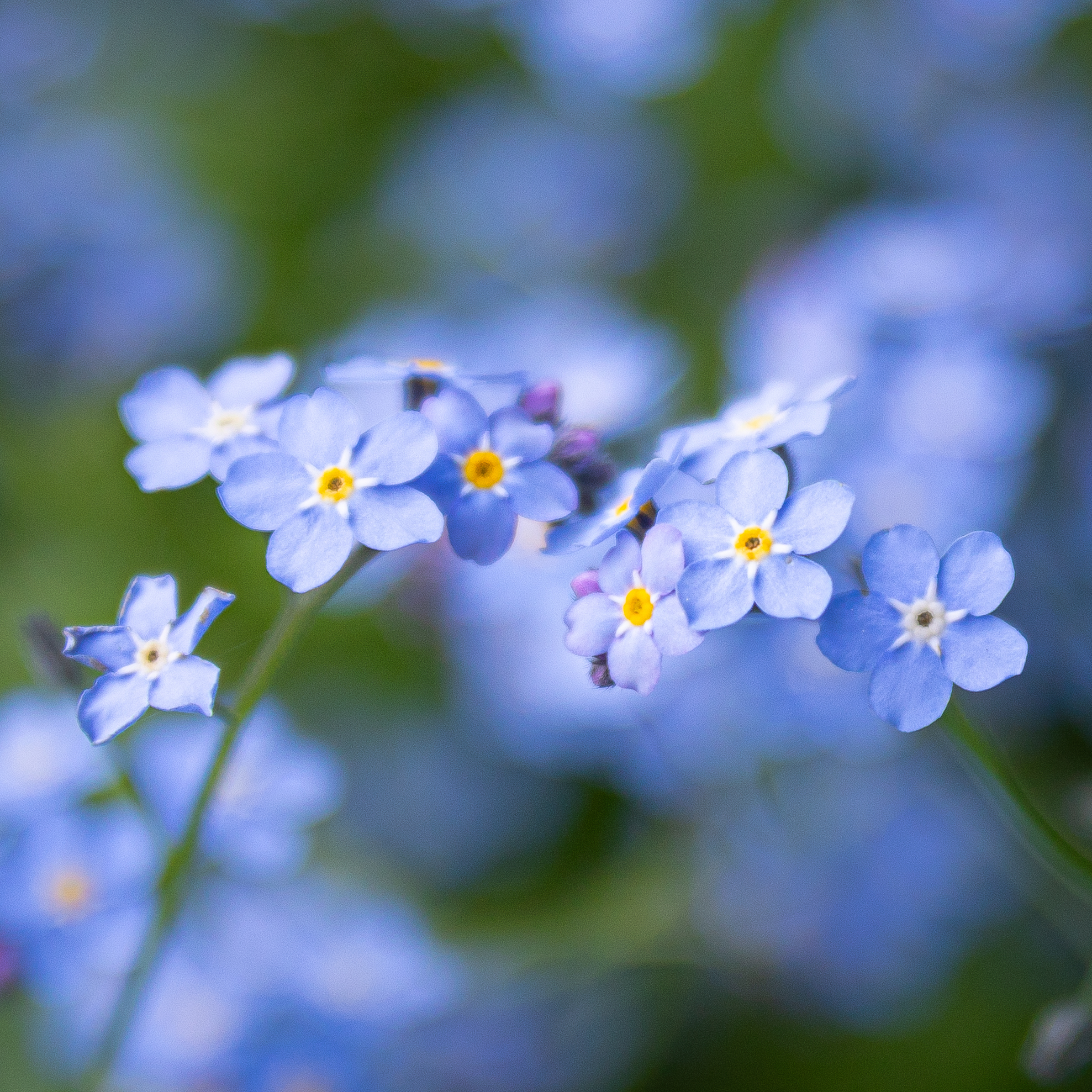
- Inflorescence of Myosotis sylvatica
  Generally found in woods, scree and rock ledges; common throughout the British Isles.

== Cultivation ==
Widely cultivated throughout the temperate world, it is particularly associated with spring bedding schemes involving other spring-flowering subjects, notably daffodils, tulips, wallflowers, and primulas. Typically seeds are sown one year to flower the next. Though short-lived, plants readily self-seed in favourable situations. Plants maintain leaf growth throughout winter.

M. sylvatica is also a parent of numerous cultivars in shades of pink, blue and white. The cultivars 'Bluesylva' and the compact 'Blue Ball' have gained the Royal Horticultural Society's Award of Garden Merit.

Other cultivars include:

- 'Blue Basket', a taller variety with deeper blue flowers
- 'Music', erect and large flowered
- 'Pompadour', compact, ball-shaped with large rose-pink flowers
- 'Snowball', white flowers
- 'Ultramarine', dwarf with very deep blue flowers
- 'Victoria Rose', bright pink flowers

== British Isles ==
As plants readily self-seed, it is often difficult to establish whether plants seen in the wild are in fact garden escapes.

It is widespread in England, Wales, and the Isle of Man, although less frequent further north. It can be found along much of the east coast of Scotland and areas in the South West, although missing from most of the Highlands, Orkney, Shetland, and the Outer Hebrides. In Ireland it is mostly found in Northern Ireland, although there are a few spots in the Republic of Ireland.

== Gallery ==
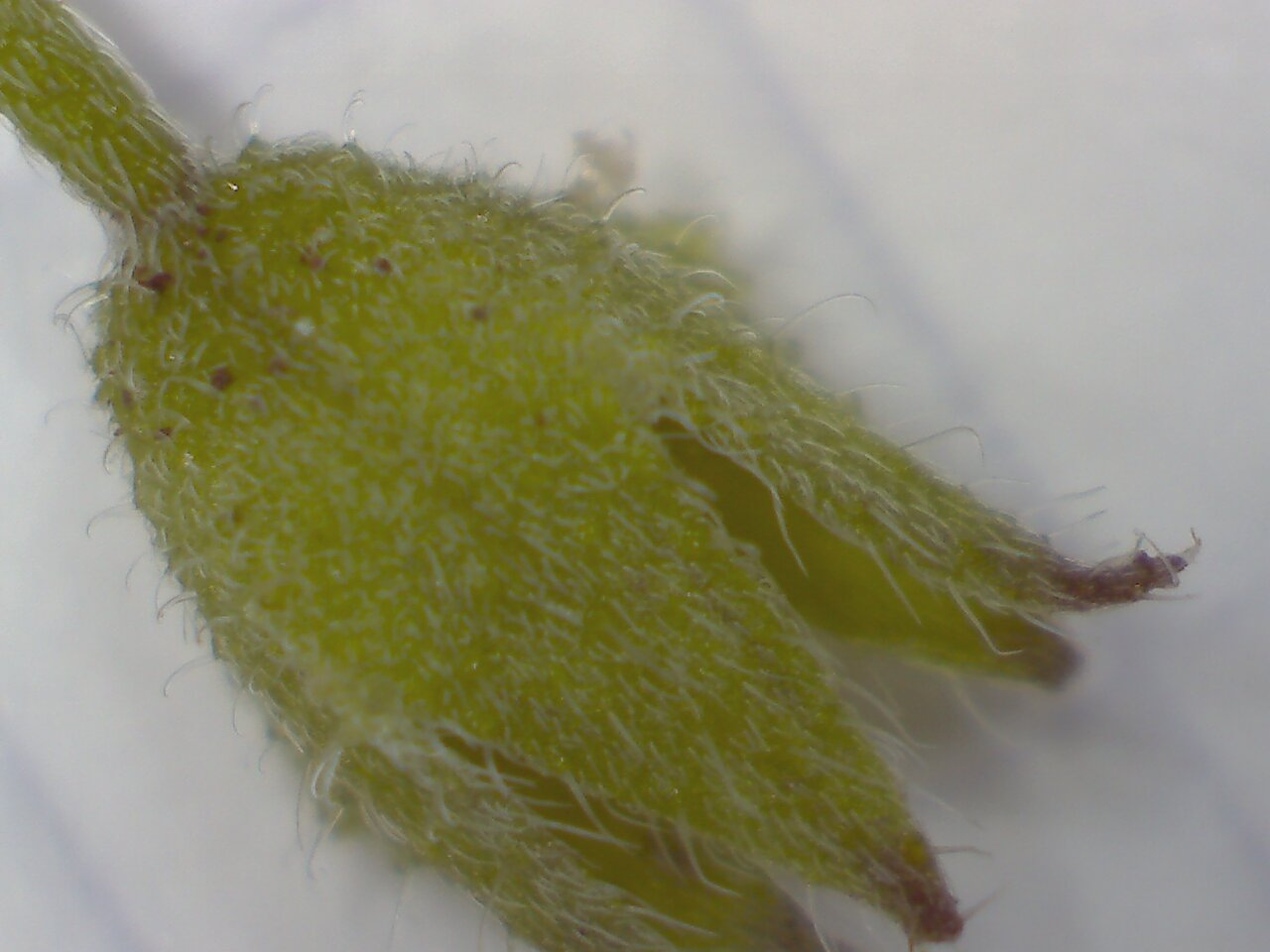
Close up of calyx, background lines are 5mm apart

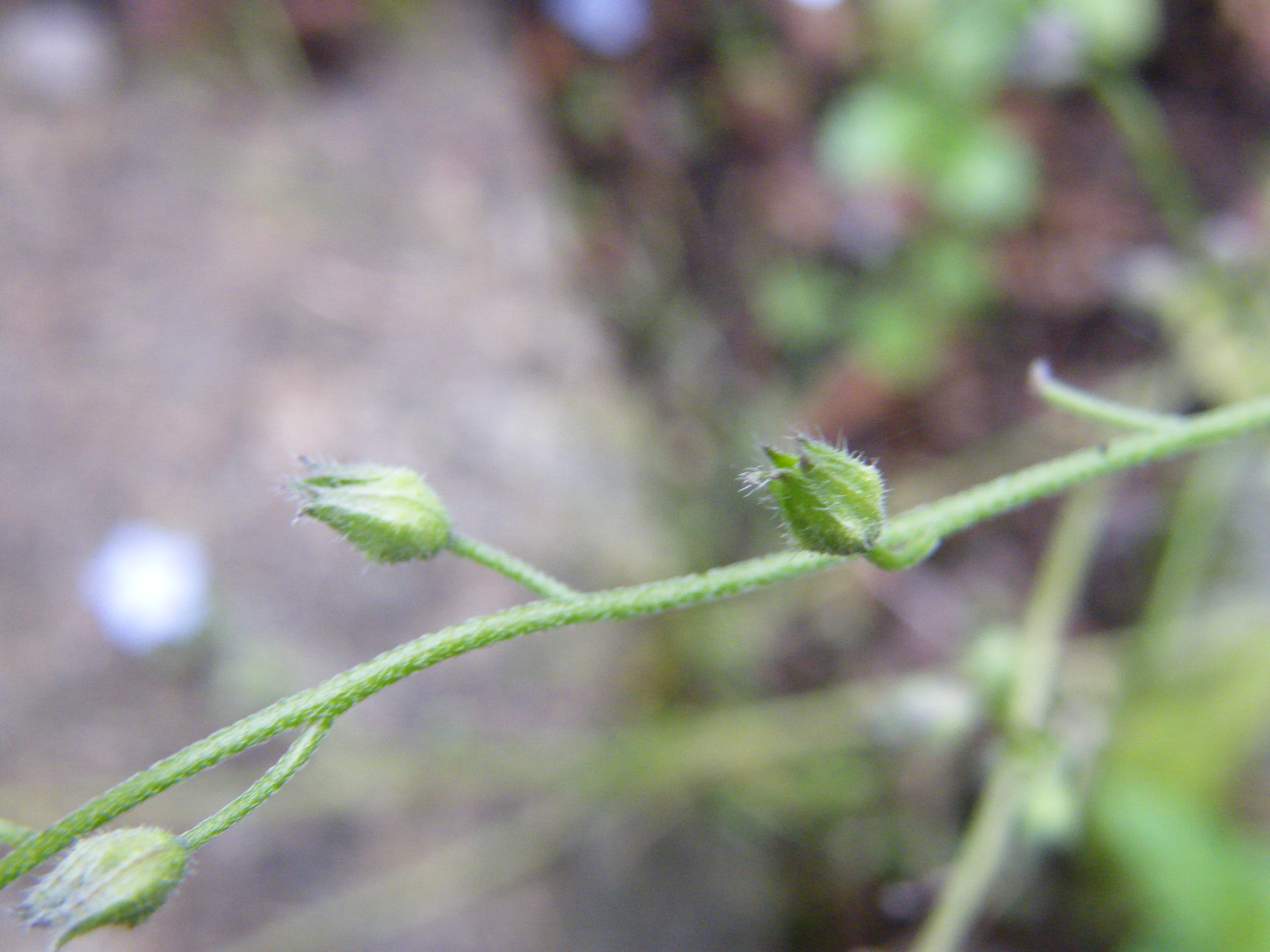
Calyx in its stem

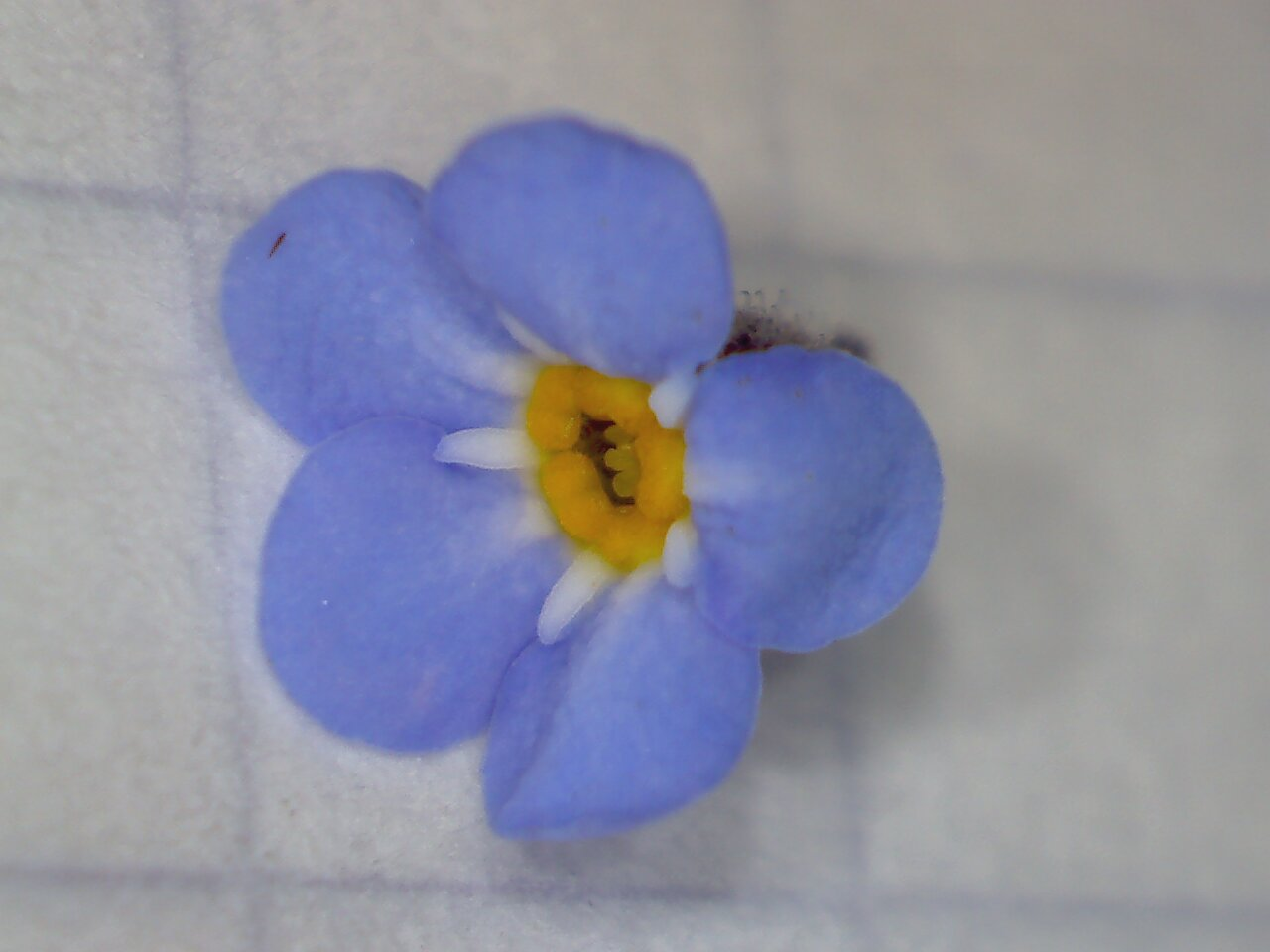
Close up of flower, background square is 5mm across

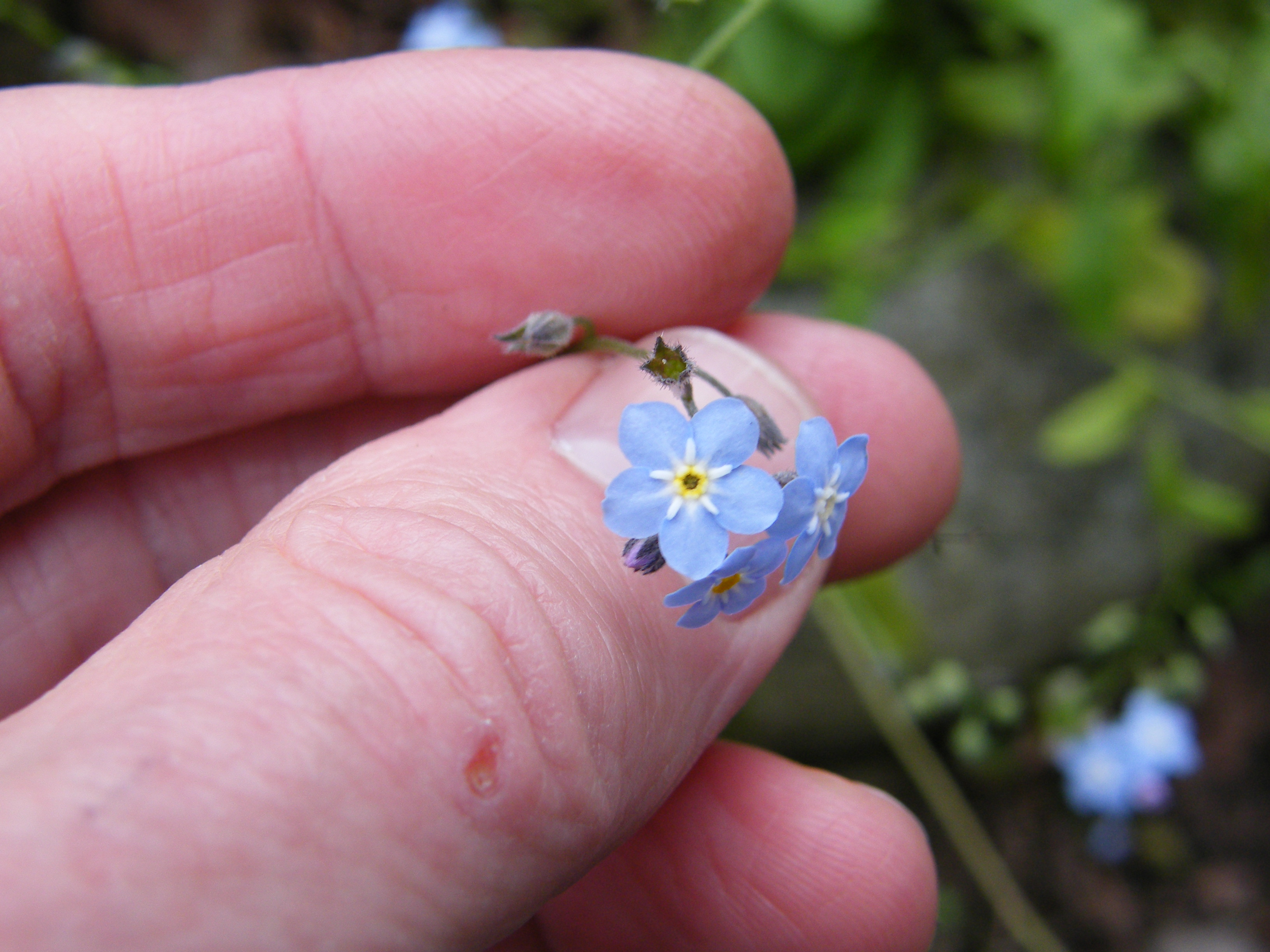
Flower head - note how flat the petals are

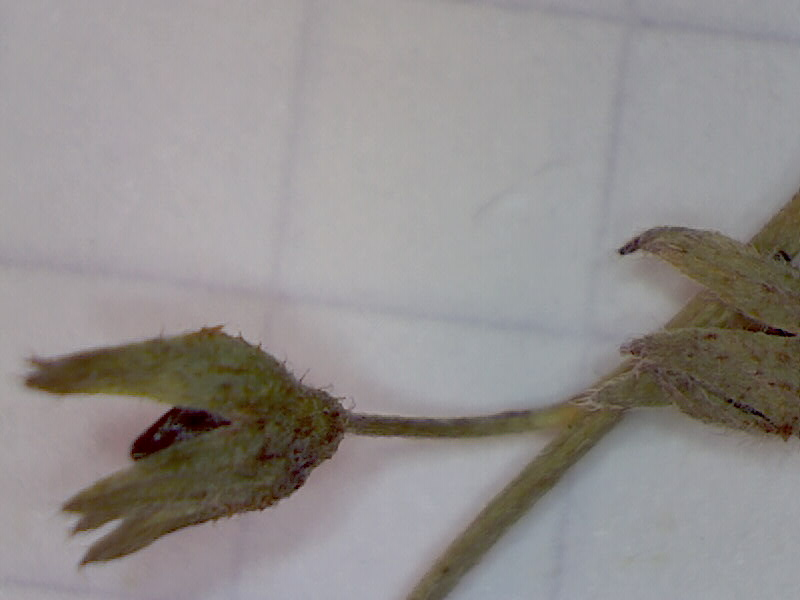
Calyx with mature fruit inside, background lines are 5mm apart

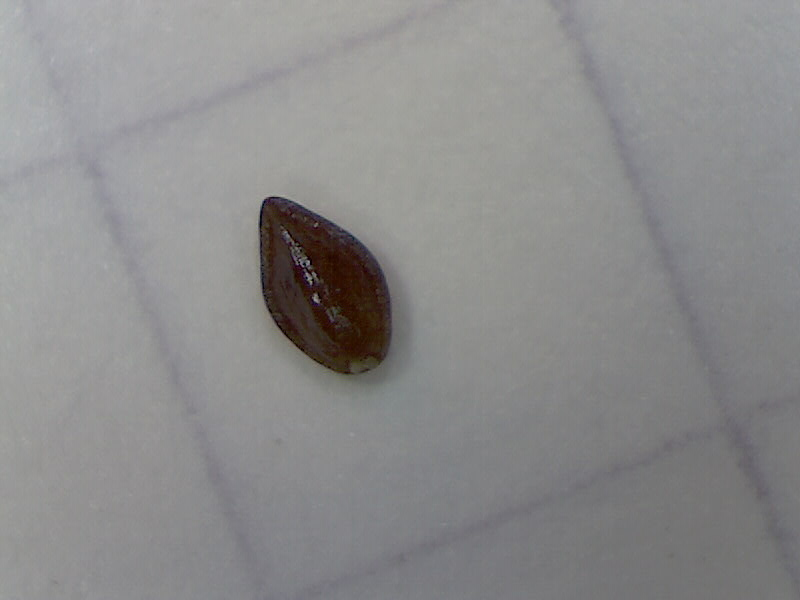
Side 1 of mature fruit, background lines are 5mm apart

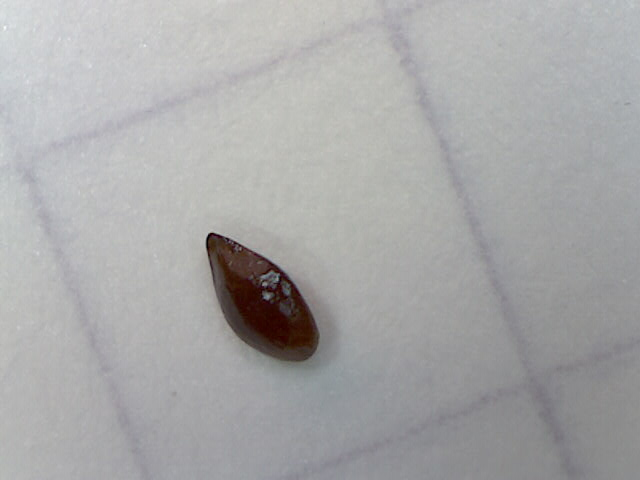
Side 2 of mature fruit, background lines are 5mm apart

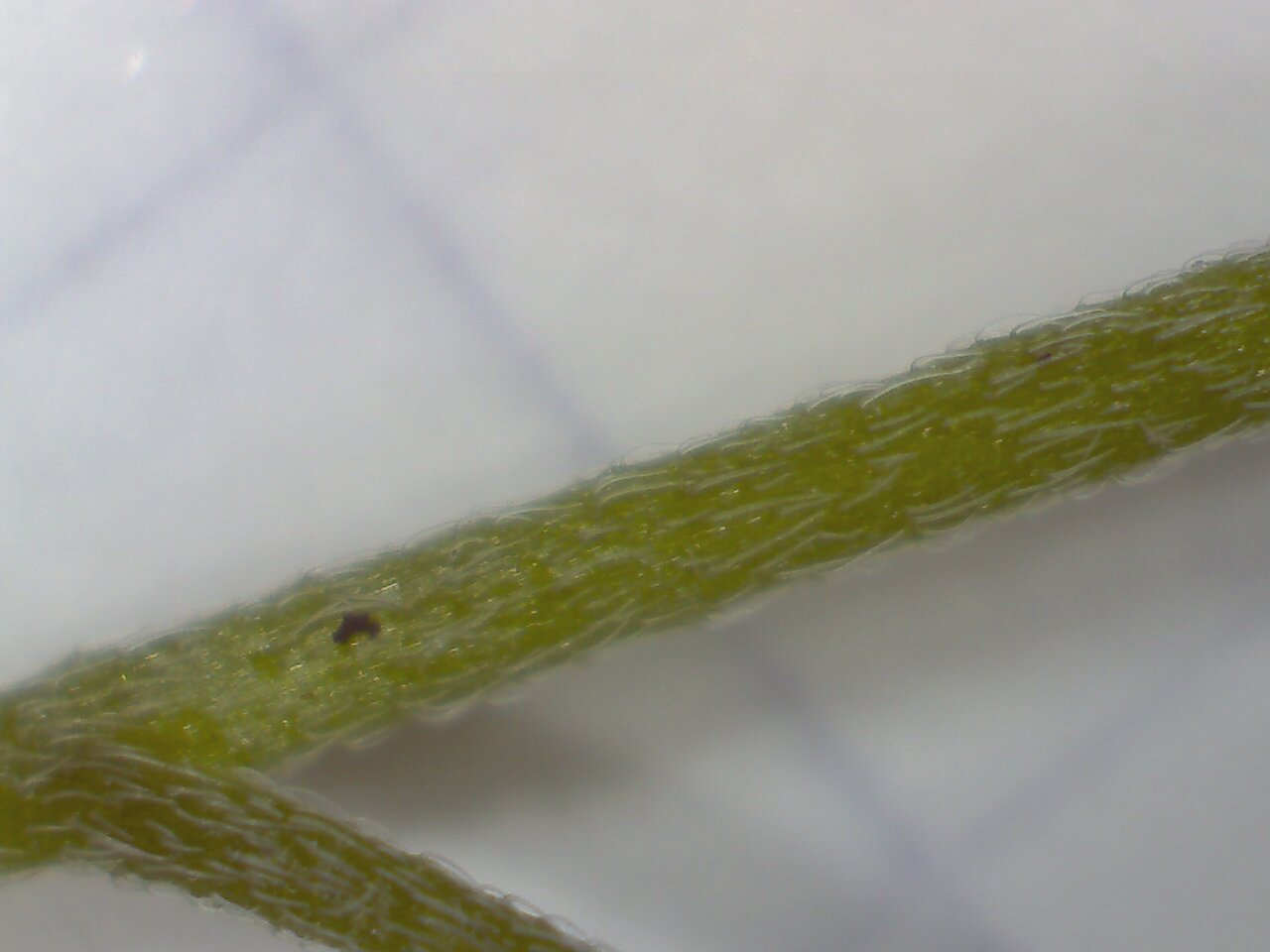
Close up of stem, background square is 5mm across
