= Diocesan Board of Finance =

A Diocesan Board of Finance, often abbreviated to DBF, is an institution of the Church of England which owns land and controls a number of financial matters in each of the Church's dioceses.

Such boards have existed in every diocese of the Church since 1926, their creation having been required by the Diocesan Boards of Finance Measure 1925, a measure passed by the National Assembly of the Church of England "to make provision for the Powers, Duties and Constitution of Diocesan Boards of Finance". However, some were established before that, by local initiatives.

A Diocesan Board of Finance is constituted by the Diocesan Synod and must be incorporated as a company under the Companies Acts. It must be registered under the Companies Act 2006, and also as a charitable organization. For example, Salisbury DBF was incorporated in 1882 and established as a charity in 1923.

As laid down by the Diocesan Stipends Funds Measure 1953, one function of a Diocesan Board of Finance is to maintain a capital account and an income account for the diocesan stipends fund.

By virtue of the Endowments and Glebe Measure 1976, with effect from 1 April 1978 all glebe land of the Church of England, which until then had belonged to the individual incumbents of benefices, became vested "without any conveyance or other assurance" in the Diocesan Board of Finance of the diocese to which the benefice belonged, even if the land was in another diocese.

The case of Fraser and another v. Canterbury Diocesan Board of Finance [2005] UKHL 65, decided by the Appellate Committee of the House of Lords in October 2005, concerned land in Maidstone given for a school site in 1866, under the Schools Sites Act 1841. The Diocesan Board of Finance argued that it was entitled to keep the sale proceeds for its own purposes, as any claim for return of the land was statute barred. However, Lord Nicholls of Birkenhead, Lord Hoffmann, Lord Hope of Craighead, Lord Walker of Gestingthorpe, and Lord Brown of Eaton-under-Heywood all found against the Diocesan Board of Finance and ordered that it must return the proceeds of the sale to the heirs of the original donors.
