= Vagabonds Act =

Vagabonds Act may refer to:

- Vagabonds Act 1383 (7 Ric. 2. c. 5), Act of the Parliament of England under Richard II
- Vagabonds Act 1530 (22 Hen. 8. c.12), Act of the Parliament of England, a part of Henry VIII's "Tudor Poor Laws"
- Vagabonds Act 1536 (27 Hen. 8. c. 25), Act of the Parliament of England, a part of Henry VIII's "Tudor Poor Laws"
- Vagabonds Act 1547 (1 Edw. 4. c. 3), Act of the Parliament of England under Edward VI
- Vagabonds Act 1549 (3 & 4 Edw. 6. c. 16), Act of the Parliament of England under Edward VI
- Vagabonds Act 1572 (14 Eliz. 1. c. 5), Act of the Parliament of England, a part of Elizabeth I's "Tudor Poor Laws"
- Vagabonds Act 1597 (39 Eliz. 1. c. 3), Act of the Parliament of England, a part of Elizabeth I's "Tudor Poor Laws"

== See also ==
- Statute of Cambridge 1388 (12 Ric. 2. c. 7), Act of the Parliament of England under Richard II
- Vagabonds and Beggars Act 1494 (11 Hen. 7. c. 2), Act of the Parliament of England under Henry VII
- Tudor Poor Laws, through the Tudor era (1485–1603)
- Poor Relief Act 1601 (43 Eliz. 1. c. 2), Act of the Parliament of England under Elizabeth I, the "Elizabethan Poor Law"
- Pedlars Act 1871 (34 & 35 Vict. c. 96), Act of the Parliament of the United Kingdom under Queen Victoria
- Prevention of Crimes Act 1871 (34 & 35 Vict. c. 112), Act of the Parliament of the United Kingdom under Queen Victoria
- Penal Servitude Act 1891 (54 & 55 Vict. c. 69), Act of the Parliament of the United Kingdom under Queen Victoria
- Vagrancy Act (disambiguation)
