= Vagrancy Act =

Vagrancy Act may refer to:

== Kingdom of England ==
- Vagabonds and Beggars Act 1494 (11 Hen. 7. c. 2), act of the Parliament of England
- Vagabonds Act 1530 (22 Hen. 8. c. 12), act of the Parliament of England
- Vagabonds Act 1547 (1 Edw. 6. c. 3), act of the Parliament of England
- Vagabonds Act 1572 (14 Eliz. 1. c. 5), act of the Parliament of England
- Vagabonds Act 1597 (39 Eliz. 1. c. 4), act of the Parliament of England

== United Kingdom ==
- Vagrancy Act 1824 (5 Geo. 4. c. 83), act of the Parliament of the United Kingdom
- Vagrancy Act 1838 (1 & 2 Vict. c. 38), act of the Parliament of the United Kingdom
- Vagrancy Act 1898 (61 & 62 Vict. c. 39), act of the Parliament of the United Kingdom
- Vagrancy Act 1935 (25 & 26 Geo. 5. c. 20), act of the Parliament of the United Kingdom
