= Tudor poor laws =

Tudor laws regarding poor relief

The Tudor poor laws were the laws regarding poor relief in the Kingdom of England around the time of the Tudor period (1485–1603). The Tudor Poor Laws ended with the passing of the Elizabethan Poor Law in 1601, two years before the end of the Tudor dynasty, a piece of legislation which codified the previous Tudor legislation.

During the Tudor period it is estimated that up to one-third of the population lived in poverty. The population doubled in size between the reigns of Henry VIII and Elizabeth I. The earliest Tudor poor laws were very much focused on punishing beggars and vagabonds. For example, the Vagabonds and Beggars Act 1495 passed by Henry VII decreed that idle persons should be placed in the stocks and then returned to the hundred where he last dwelled or was born.

The closing of the monasteries in the 1530s after the Reformation increased poverty as the church had previously helped the poor, both as an institution and by encouraging its parishioners towards Christian charity. However, the church reforms of Henry VIII marked a national shift, where philanthropy became increasingly secular, rather than meted out by the Church.

The Vagabonds Act 1530 mandated that only licensed beggars could beg legally. Justices of the peace had the power to license the "impotent" poor to beg. In practice, this meant that only the elderly and disabled could beg and also prevented the able-bodied from begging. A few years later, the Vagabonds Act 1536 was passed. This more severe law stated that those caught outside of their parish without work would be punished by being whipped through the streets. If caught a second time they could lose an ear and if caught a third time they could be executed. However officers of the law were reluctant to enforce such a draconian provision.

Additional poor laws were passed throughout the 16th century by Henry VIII's successors. King Edward VI passed the Vagabonds Act 1547, which continued weekly parish collections for the poor.

The Poor Act 1551 creating Registers of the Poor and parishes gained the power to raise local taxes through rates. However, help was only available to those considered deserving of poor relief. The deserving poor were those who were willing to work but were unable to find employment as well as those too old, young, or ill to work. Beggars were not considered deserving of poor relief and could be whipped through the town until they altered their behaviour. In a further effort to control the poor, Mary I passed the Poor Act 1555 (2 & 3 Ph. & M. c. 5), requiring licensed beggars to display badges.

The Vagabonds Act 1572 provided comprehensive reform that would become the basis for the 1597 and 1601 Elizabethan poor laws. It provided additional structure for the registration of poor and parish collections. The Poor Act 1575 required that each parish had to have a store of "wool, hemp, flax, iron" so that the poor could be set to work.

Although the phrase "Elizabethan poor laws" is generally used to refer to the 1598 and 1601 poor laws passed by Queen Elizabeth I and subsequent statutes, Elizabeth I passed laws early in her reign that are a part of the earlier Tudor poor laws. Her Poor Act 1562 required all parish residents to contribute to poor collections, and further provided for the punishment of refusal to contribute.
