= Poor Act 1551 =

Act of the Parliament of England

- Act of Parliament
- Parliament of England
- Long title: An Act for the Provision and Relief of the Poor.
- Citation: 5 & 6 Edw. 6. c. 2
- Territorial extent: England and Wales

Dates
- Royal assent: 15 April 1552
- Commencement: 23 January 1552 (Note: Start of session)
- Repealed: 28 July 1863
Other legislation
Amended by	Continuance of Acts Act 1553; Continuance of Laws Act 1553; Continuance of Laws Act 1554; Poor Act 1555
Repealed by	Statute Law Revision Act 1863
Relates to	Vagabonds Act 1530; Vagabonds Act 1536; Vagabonds Act 1547

Status: Repealed

Text of statute as originally enacted

The Poor Act 1551 (5 & 6 Edw. 6. c. 2) was an act of the Parliament of England passed during the reign of King Edward VI. It is a part of the Tudor Poor Laws and reaffirms previous poor laws, including the Vagabonds Act 1536 (27 Hen. 8. c. 25), the Vagabonds Act 1547 (1 Edw. 6. c. 3), and 1549 which focused primarily on the punishment of vagabonds.

The act designated a new position, "collector of alms," in each parish. Local authorities and residents elected two alms collectors to request, record, and distribute charitable donations for poor relief. It further provided that each parish would keep a register of all its “impotent, aged, and needy persons” and the aid they received. Parish authorities were directed to “gently exhort” any person that could contribute but would not, referring them to the Bishop of the Diocese if they continued to refuse. Punishment for neglecting poor relief obligations was adopted in the Poor Act 1562 (5 Eliz. 1. c. 3) and reliance on charity was replaced by a system of taxation in the Poor Relief Act 1597 (39 Eliz. 1. c. 3). Under the assumption that all poor would be cared for, begging openly was now forbidden. Licensed begging would be reinstated by the Marian Parliament of 1555 with the requirement that legal beggars wear badges.

== Social context ==
During the Tudor period, cultural perceptions began to shift away from the medieval theological belief that poverty was a virtue. The philosophical influence of Renaissance humanism and the emergence of a Protestant work ethic and rogue literature contributed to views encouraging industriousness and the stewardship of wealth and vilifying idleness, begging, and vagrancy. As poverty rates and the costs of poor relief rose, communities attempted to define and limit who qualified for aid, restricting support by locality and moral conduct.

== Economic context ==
The rise of poverty rates during the Tudor period can be attributed to a confluence of factors. Rebellions in 1549 hampered harvest efforts and crop shortages in the following years contributed to price inflation. A series of coin debasements between 1544-1551 undermined economic confidence. Rapid population growth and the effects of Tudor enclosure policies led to the supply of labour exceeding demand and agricultural and industrial wages falling sharply. High birth-rates also meant a large percentage of the population were too young to contribute economically. Additionally, the dissolution of the monasteries removed all Catholic Church-operated charities, religious guilds, and lay fraternities that provided formal and informal aid and confiscated parish lands and livestock which had also been used to provide poor relief. The process of replacing these institutions was often slow and uneven.

== Provisions ==
Section 6 of the act provided that the act would remain in force until the end of the next parliament.

== Subsequent developments ==
The whole act was continued until the end of the next parliament by section 1 of the Continuance of Acts Act 1553 (7 Edw. 6. c. 11).

The whole act was continued until the end of the next parliament by section 1 of the Continuance of Laws Act 1553 (1 Mar. Sess. 2. c. 13).

The whole act was continued until the end of the next parliament by section 1 of the Continuance of Laws Act 1554 (1 Mar. Sess. 3. c. 12).

The whole act was repealed by section 1 of, and the schedule to, the Statute Law Revision Act 1863 (26 & 27 Vict. c. 125), which came into force on 28 July 1863.
