= Poor relief in England =

British government and ecclesiastical action to relieve poverty

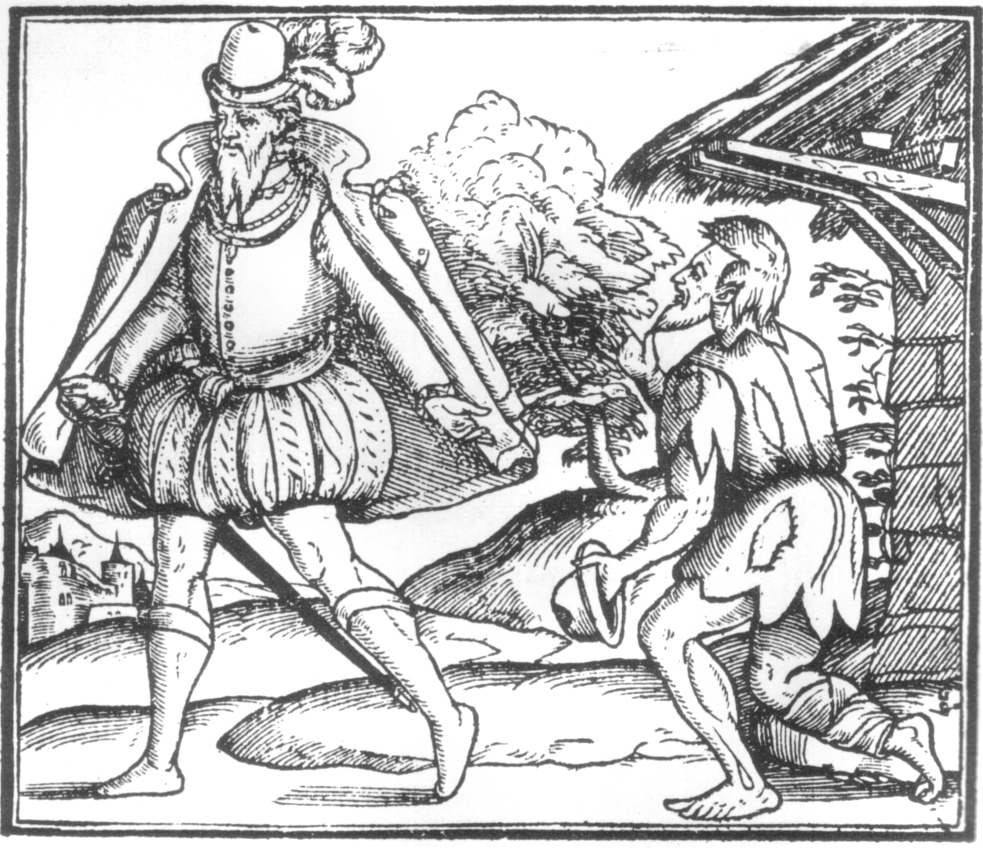
Woodcut-16th century: gentleman giving alms to beggar

In English and British history, poor relief refers to government and ecclesiastical action to relieve poverty, particularly before the Liberal welfare reforms beginning in 1906. Beginning in 1551, the Parliaments of England and of Great Britain and the United Kingdom made legal provision for government and ecclesiastical funds to be used to alleviate extreme poverty. The Poor Relief Act 1601 established the system that would operate without major changes until the Poor Law Amendment Act 1834, which reorganized the system, aiming to curb abuses and cut overall spending on relief.

Beginning in the late 19th century, changing attitudes to poverty and the widening of the franchise to include at first some and then all working-class people through a series of Representation of the People Acts led to the development of the first predecessors of the modern welfare state. Between 1906 and 1914, the Liberal Party created a suite of basic welfare programs that reduced dependence on the Poor Law system but did not abolish it. The vestiges of the system remained until 1948 with the passage of the Attlee ministry’s National Assistance Act, which transferred non-National Insurance poor relief efforts to the new National Assistance programme. Today, welfare benefits such as Universal Credit provide financial resources for those with little or no income.

== Tudor era ==
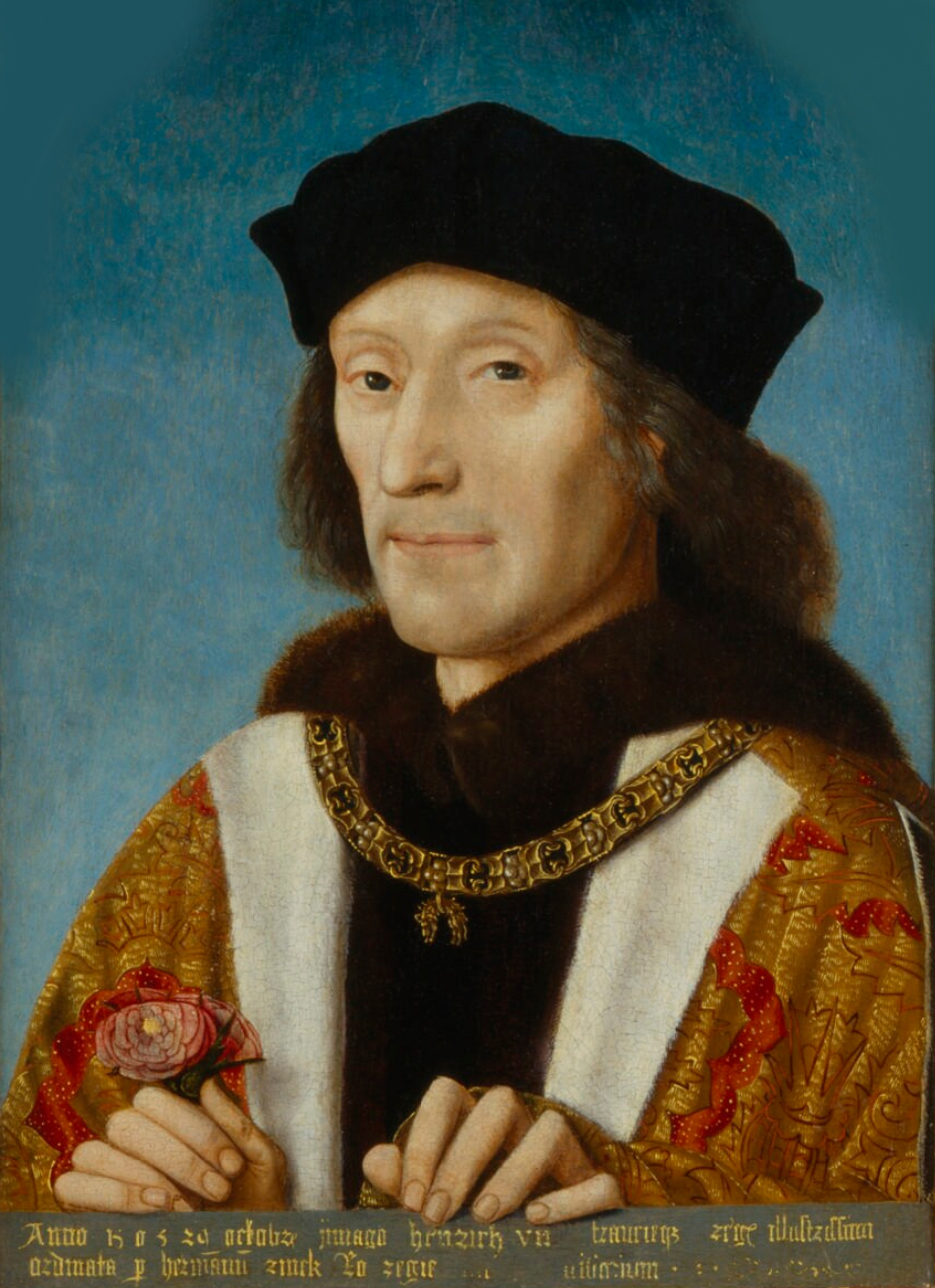
Henry VII of England

In the late 15th century, Parliament took action on the growing problem of poverty, focusing on punishing people for being "vagabonds" and for begging. In 1495, during the reign of King Henry VII, Parliament enacted the Vagabonds and Beggars Act 1494. This provided for officers of the law to arrest and hold "all such vagabonds, idle and suspect persons living suspiciously and them so taken to set in stocks, there to remain three nights and to have none other sustenance but bread and water; and after the said three days and three nights, to be had out and set at large and to be commanded to avoid the town." As historian Mark Rathbone has discussed in his article "Vagabond!", this act of Parliament relied on a very loose definition of a vagabond and did not make any distinction between those who were simply unemployed and looking for employment and those who chose to live the life of a vagabond. In addition, the act failed to recognise the "impotent poor": those who could not provide for themselves. These included the sick, the elderly, and disabled people. This lack of a precise definition of a vagabond would hinder the effectiveness of the Vagabonds and Beggars Act 1494 for years to come.

=== Dissolution of the Monasteries ===
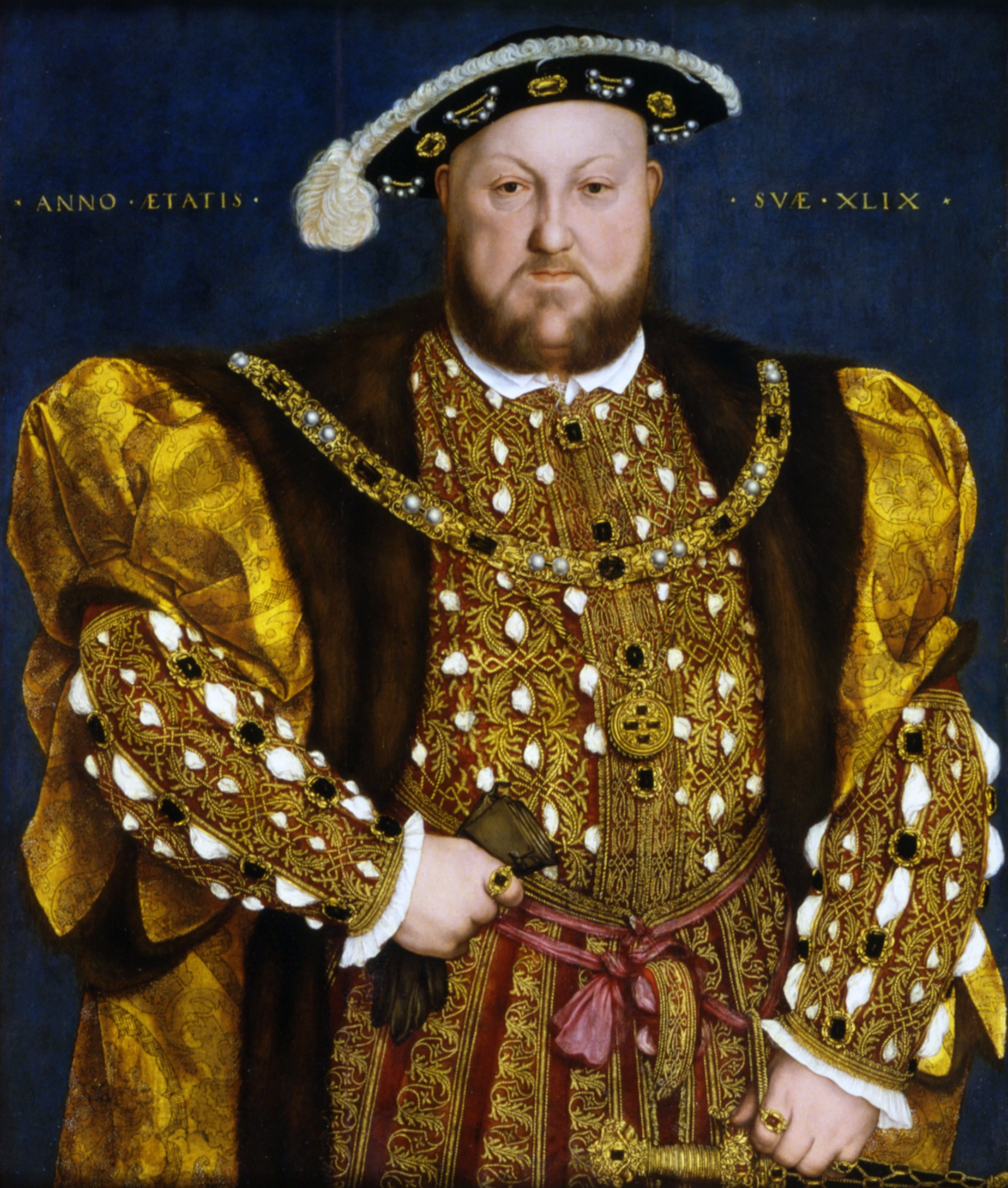
Henry VIII of England

The problem of poverty in England was exacerbated during the early 16th century by a dramatic increase in the population. This rose "from little more than 2 million in 1485, ... [to] about 2.8 million by the end of Henry VII's reign (1509)". The population was growing faster than the economy's ability to provide employment opportunities. The problem was made worse because during the English Reformation, Henry VIII severed the ecclesiastical governance of his kingdoms of England and Ireland and made himself the Supreme Head of the Church of England. This involved the Dissolution of the Monasteries in England and Wales: the assets of hundreds of rich religious institutions, including their great estates, were taken by the Crown. This had a devastating impact on poor relief. According to the historian Paul Slack, prior to the Dissolution "it has been estimated that monasteries alone provided 6,500 pounds a year in alms before 1537 [equivalent to £4,600,000 in 2025]; and that sum was not made good by private benefactions until after 1580." In addition to the closing of the monasteries, most hospitals (which in the 16th century were generally almshouses rather than medical institutions) were also closed, as they "had come to be seen as special types of religious houses". This left many of the elderly and sick without accommodation or care.

=== Vagabonds Acts ===
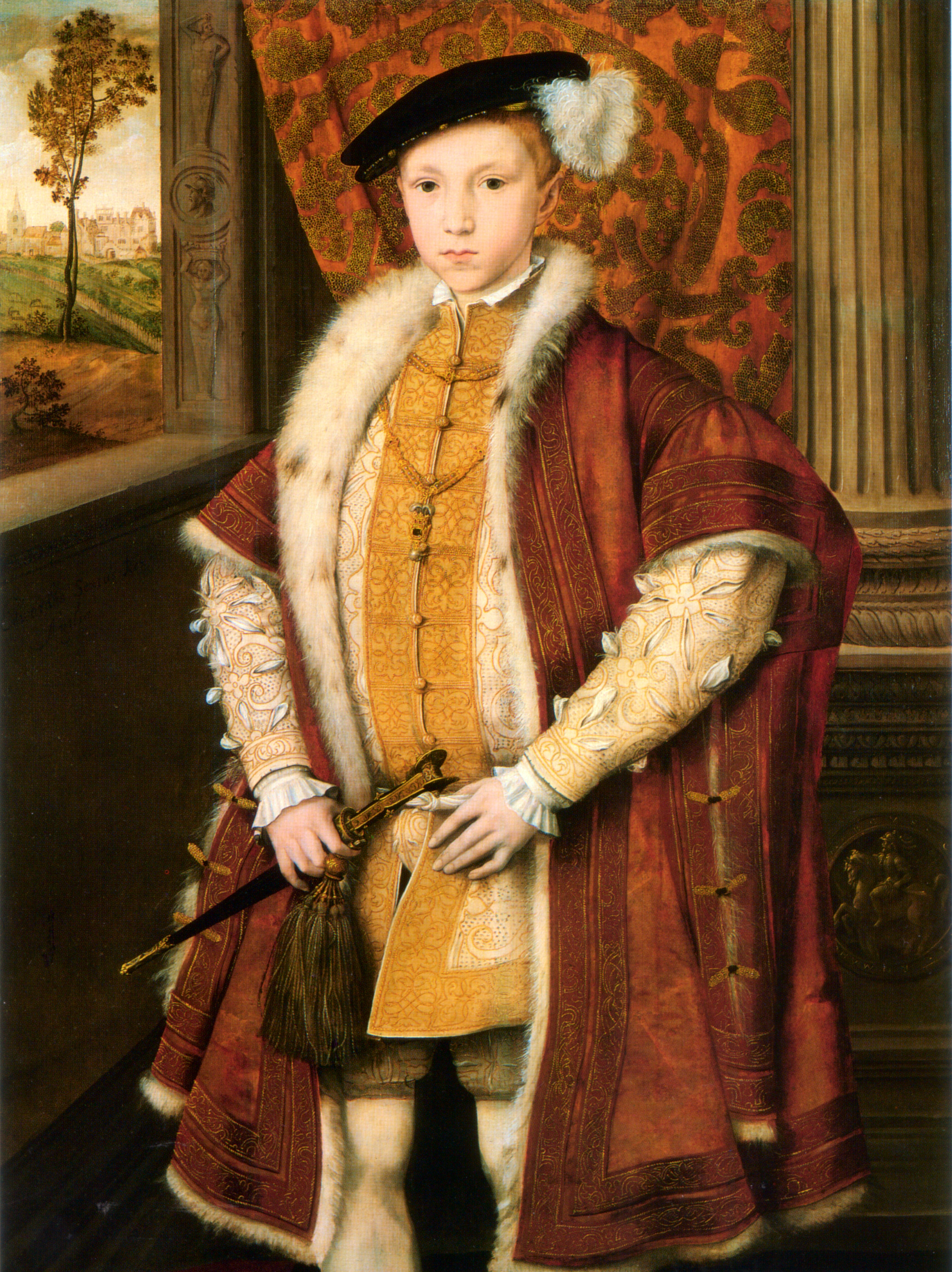
Edward VI of England

In 1531, the Vagabonds and Beggars Act 1494 was revised, and a new act, the Vagabonds Act 1530, was passed by Parliament which did make some provision for the different classes of the poor. The sick, the elderly, and disabled people were to be issued with licences to beg. But those who were out of work and in search of employment were still not spared punishment. Throughout the 16th century, a fear of social unrest was the primary motive for much legislation that was passed by Parliament. This fear of social unrest carried into the reign of Edward VI. A new level of punishment was introduced in the Duke of Somerset's Vagabonds Act 1547. "Two years' servitude and branding with a 'V' was the penalty for the first offense, and attempts to run away were to be punished by lifelong slavery and, there for a second time, execution." However, "there is no evidence that the Act was enforced." In 1550 these punishments were revised in a new act. The Vagabonds Act 1549 makes a reference to the limited enforcement of the punishments established by the Vagabonds Act 1547 by stating "the extremity of some [of the laws] have been occasion that they have not been put into use."

=== Parliament and the parish ===
Following the revision of the Vagabonds Act 1547, Parliament passed the Poor Act 1551. This focused on using the parishes as a source of funds to combat the increasing poverty epidemic. This statute appointed two "overseers" from each parish to collect money to be distributed to the poor who were considered to belong to the parish. These overseers were to 'gently ask' for donations for poor relief; refusal would ultimately result in a meeting with the local bishop, who would 'induce and persuade' the recalcitrant parishioners. However, at times even such a meeting with the bishop would often fail to achieve its object.

Sensing that voluntary donation was ineffective, Parliament passed new legislation, the Poor Act 1562, in 1563, and once this act took effect parishioners could be brought by the bishop before the justices, and continued refusal could lead to imprisonment until contribution was made. However, even the Poor Act 1562 still suffered from shortcomings, because individuals could decide for themselves how much money to give in order to gain their freedom.

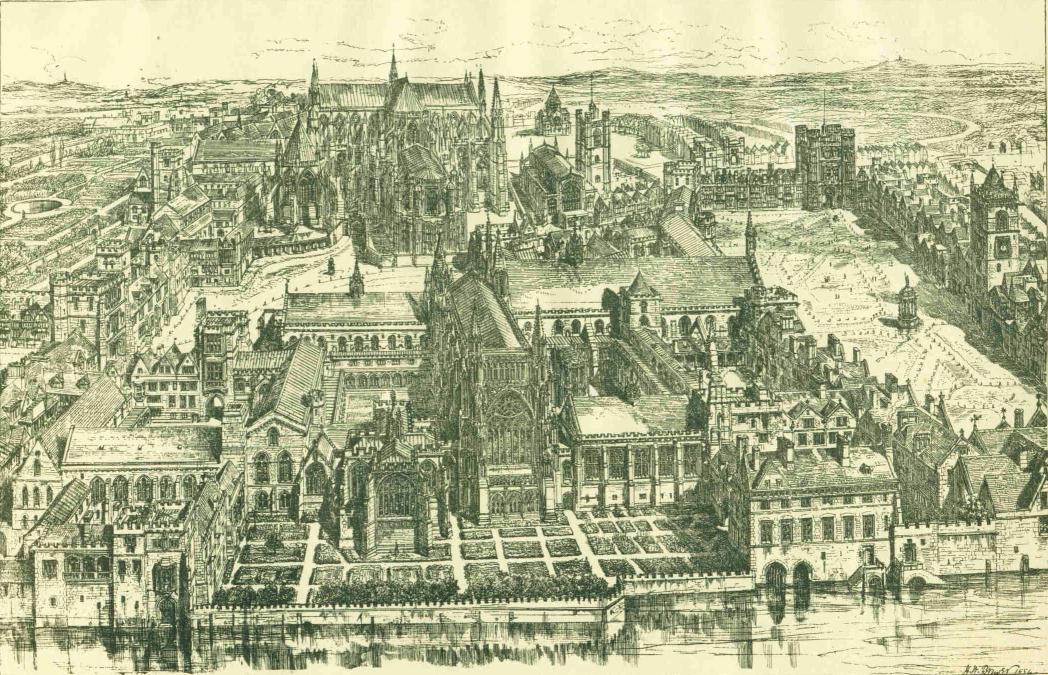
Palace of Westminster in the 16th century

A more structured system of donations was established by the Vagabonds Act 1572. After determining the amount of funds needed to provide for the poor of each parish, justices of the peace were granted the authority to determine the amount of the donation from each parish's more wealthy property-owners. This act finally turned these donations into what was effectively a local tax.

In addition to creating these new imposed taxes, the Vagabonds Act 1572 created a new set of punishments to inflict upon the population of vagabonds. These included being "bored through the ear" for a first offense and hanging for "persistent beggars". Unlike the previous brutal punishments established by the Vagabonds Act 1547, these extreme measures were enforced with great frequency.

However, despite its introduction of such violent actions to deter vagabonding, the Vagabonds Act 1572 was the first time that Parliament had passed legislation which began to distinguish between different categories of vagabonds. "Peddlers, tinkers, workmen on strike, fortune tellers, and minstrels" were not spared these gruesome acts of deterrence. This law punished all able bodied men "without land or master" who would neither accept employment nor explain the source of their livelihood. In this newly established definition of what constituted a vagabond, men who had been discharged from the military, released servants, and servants whose masters had died were specifically exempted from the act's punishments. This legislation did not establish any means to support these individuals.

=== A new approach ===
A system to support individuals who were willing to work, but who were having difficulty in finding employment, was established by the Poor Act 1575. As provided for in this, justices of the peace were authorized to provide any town which needed it with a stock of flax, hemp, or other materials on which paupers could be employed and to erect a "house of correction" in every county for the punishment of those who refused work. This was the first time Parliament had attempted to provide labour to individuals as a means to combat the increasing numbers of "vagabonds".

Two years after the Poor Act 1575 was passed into law, yet more dramatic changes were made to the methods to fight vagabondage and to provide relief to the poor. The Act of 1578 transferred power from the justices of the peace to church officials in the area of collecting the new taxes for the relief of poverty established in the Vagabonds Act 1572. In addition, this Act of 1578 also extended the power of the church by stating that "vagrants were to be summarily whipped and returned to their place of settlement by parish constables." By eliminating the need for the involvement of the Justices, law enforcement was streamlined.

== End of the Elizabethan era to 1750 ==
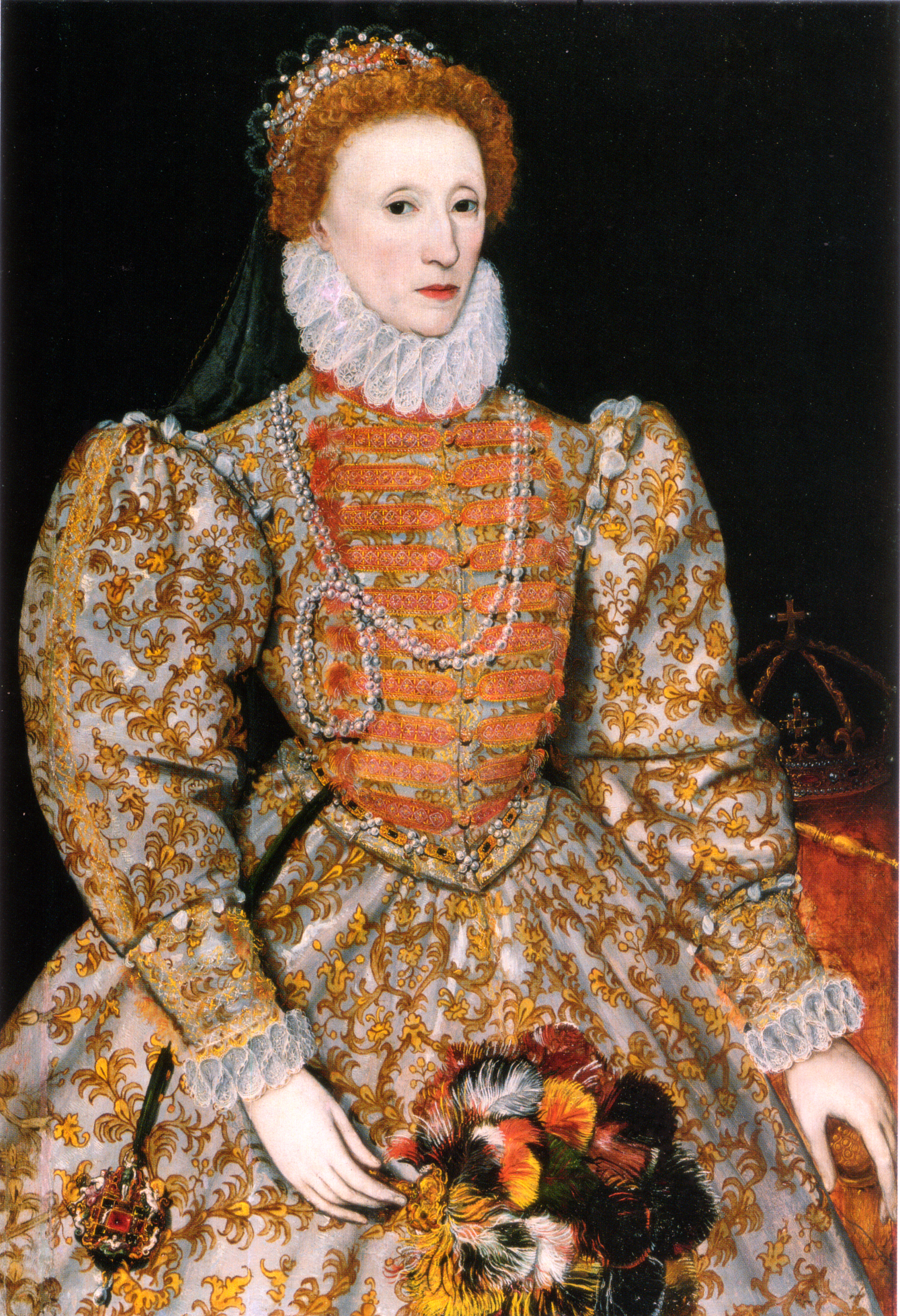
Elizabeth I of England

Starting as early as 1590, public authorities began to take a more selective approach to supporting the poor. Those who were considered to be legitimately needy, sometimes called the "deserving poor" or "worthy poor", were allowed assistance, while those who were idle were not. People incapable of providing for themselves, such as young orphans, the elderly, and the mentally and physically handicapped, were seen to be deserving, whereas those who were physically able but were too lazy to work were considered as "idle" and were seen as of bad moral character, and thus undeserving of help. Most poor relief in the 17th century came from voluntary charity which mostly was in the form of food and clothing. Parishes distributed land and animals. Institutionalized charities offered loans to help craftsmen to alms houses and hospitals.

The Poor Relief Act 1597 provided the first complete code of poor relief, established overseers of the poor and was later amended by the Poor Relief Act 1601, which was one of the longest-lasting achievements of her reign, left unaltered until 1834. This law made each parish responsible for supporting the legitimately needy in their community. It taxed wealthier citizens of the country to provide basic shelter, food and clothing, though they were not obligated to provide for those outside of their community.

Parishes responsible for their own community caused problems because some were more generous than others. This caused the poor to migrate to other parishes that were not their own. In order to counteract this problem, the Poor Relief Act 1662, also known as the Settlement Act, was implemented. This created many sojourners, people who resided in different settlements that were not their legal one. The Settlement Act allowed such people to be forcefully removed, and garnered a negative reaction from the population. In order to fix the flaws of the 1662 act, the Poor Relief Act 1691 came into effect such that it presented methods by which people could gain settlement in new locations. Such methods included "owning or renting property above a certain value or paying parish rates, but also by completing a legal apprenticeship or a one-year service while unmarried, or by serving a public office" for that identical length of time.

During the 16th and 17th centuries, the population of England nearly doubled. Capitalism in the agricultural and manufacturing arenas started to emerge, and trade abroad significantly increased. Despite this flourishing of expansion, sufficient employment rates had yet to be attained by the late 1600s. The population increased at alarming rates, outpacing the increase in productivity, which resulted inevitably in inflation. Concurrently, wages decreased, declining to a point roughly half that of average wages of a century before.

"The boom-and-bust nature of European trade in woolen cloth, England's major manufacture and export" caused a larger fraction of the population of England to fall under poverty. With this increase in poverty, all charities operated by the Catholic Church were abolished due to the impact of protestant reformation.

=== Workhouse Test Act ===
A law passed by the Parliament of Great Britain and sponsored by Sir Edward Knatchbull in 1723 required people to join workhouses to be eligible to receive aid, known as a "workhouse test". The act was intended to reduce the number of frivolous claims on poor rates.

== The Industrial Revolution ==
=== Child labour ===
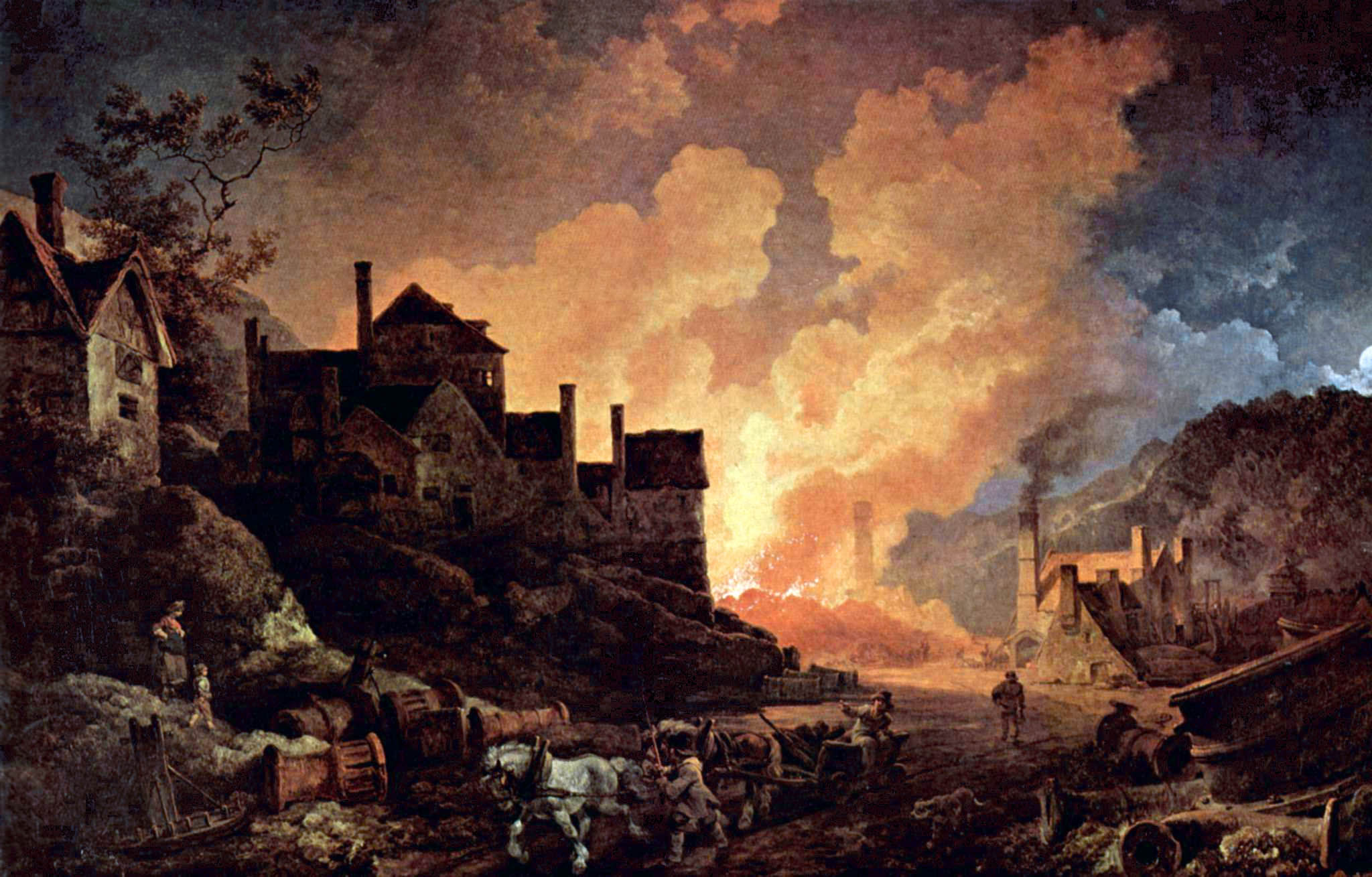
Coalbrookdale by Night, 1801

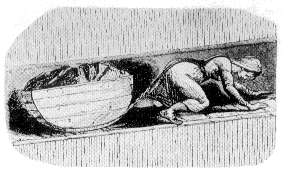
Girl pulling a coal tub in mine. From an official report of a UK parliamentary commission.

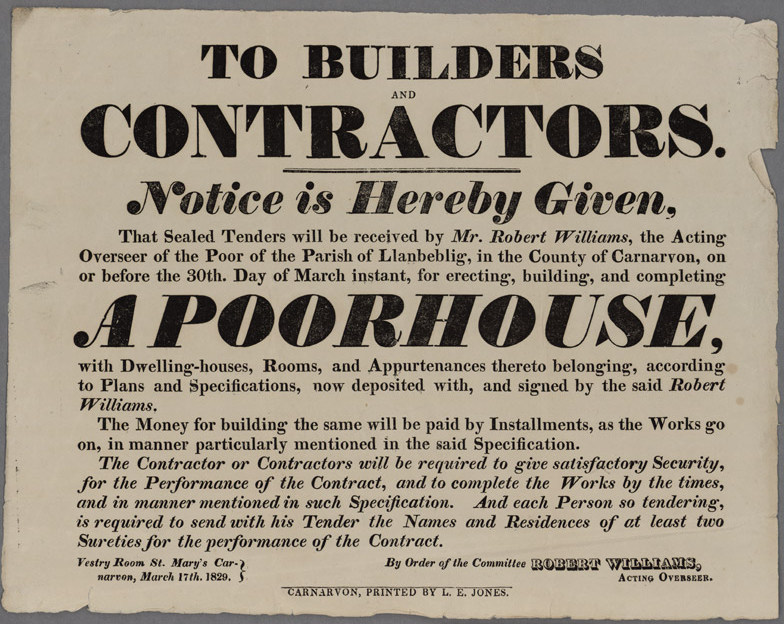
Advertisement for builders to build a new poorhouse in north Wales, 1829

By the mid to late 18th century most of the British Isles was involved in the process of industrialization in terms of production of goods, manner of markets and concepts of economic class. In some cases, factory owners "employed" children without paying them, thus exacerbating poverty levels. Furthermore, the Poor Laws of this era encouraged children to work through an apprenticeship, but by the end of the 18th century the situation changed as masters became less willing to apprentice children, and factory owners then set about employing them to keep wages down. This meant that there were not many jobs for adult labourers. For those who could not find work there was the workhouse as a means of sustenance.

=== Gilbert's Act ===
The 1782 poor relief law proposed by Thomas Gilbert aimed to organise poor relief on a county basis, counties being organised into parishes which could set up workhouses between them. However, these workhouses were intended to help only the elderly, sick and orphaned, not the able-bodied poor. The sick, elderly and infirm were cared for in poorhouses whereas the able-bodied poor were provided with poor relief in their own homes.

=== Speenhamland system ===
The Speenhamland system was a form of outdoor relief intended to mitigate rural poverty at the end of the 18th century and during the early 19th century. The system was named after a 1795 meeting at the Pelican Inn in Speenhamland, Berkshire, where a number of local magistrates devised the system as a means to alleviate the distress caused by high grain prices. The increase in the price of grain most probably occurred as a result of a poor harvest in the years 1795–96, though at the time this was subject to great debate. Many blamed middlemen and hoarders as the ultimate architects of the shortage.

The authorities at Speenhamland approved a means-tested sliding scale of wage supplements in order to mitigate the worst effects of rural poverty. Families were paid extra to top up wages to a set level according to a table. This level varied according to the number of children and the price of bread.

In 1834, the Report of the Royal Commission into the Operation of the Poor Laws 1832 called the Speenhamland System a "universal system of pauperism". The system allowed employers, including farmers and the nascent industrialists of the town, to pay below subsistence wages, because the parish would make up the difference and keep their workers alive. So the workers' low income was unchanged and the poor rate contributors subsidised the farmers.

=== New Poor Law of 1834 ===
==== Indoor relief versus outdoor relief ====
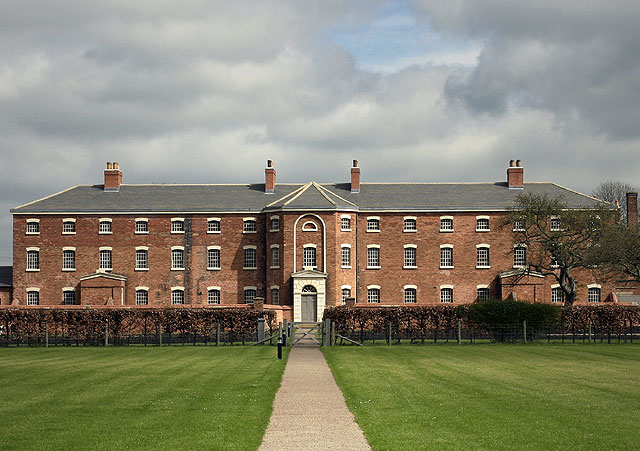
The Workhouse, Southwell, Nottinghamshire, UK

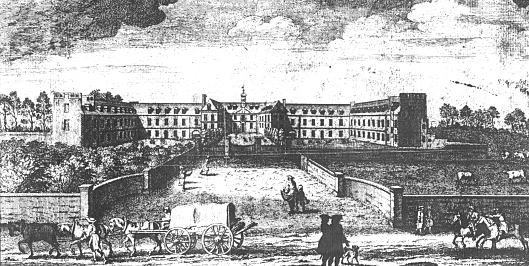
Exeter Work House 1744

Following the onset of the Industrial Revolution, in 1834 the Parliament of the United Kingdom revised the Poor Relief Act 1601 after studying the conditions found in 1832. Over the next decade they began phasing out outdoor relief and pushing the paupers towards indoor relief. The differences between the two was that outdoor relief was a monetary contribution to the needy, whereas indoor relief meant the individual was sent to one of the workhouses.

=== The Great Famine (Ireland) ===
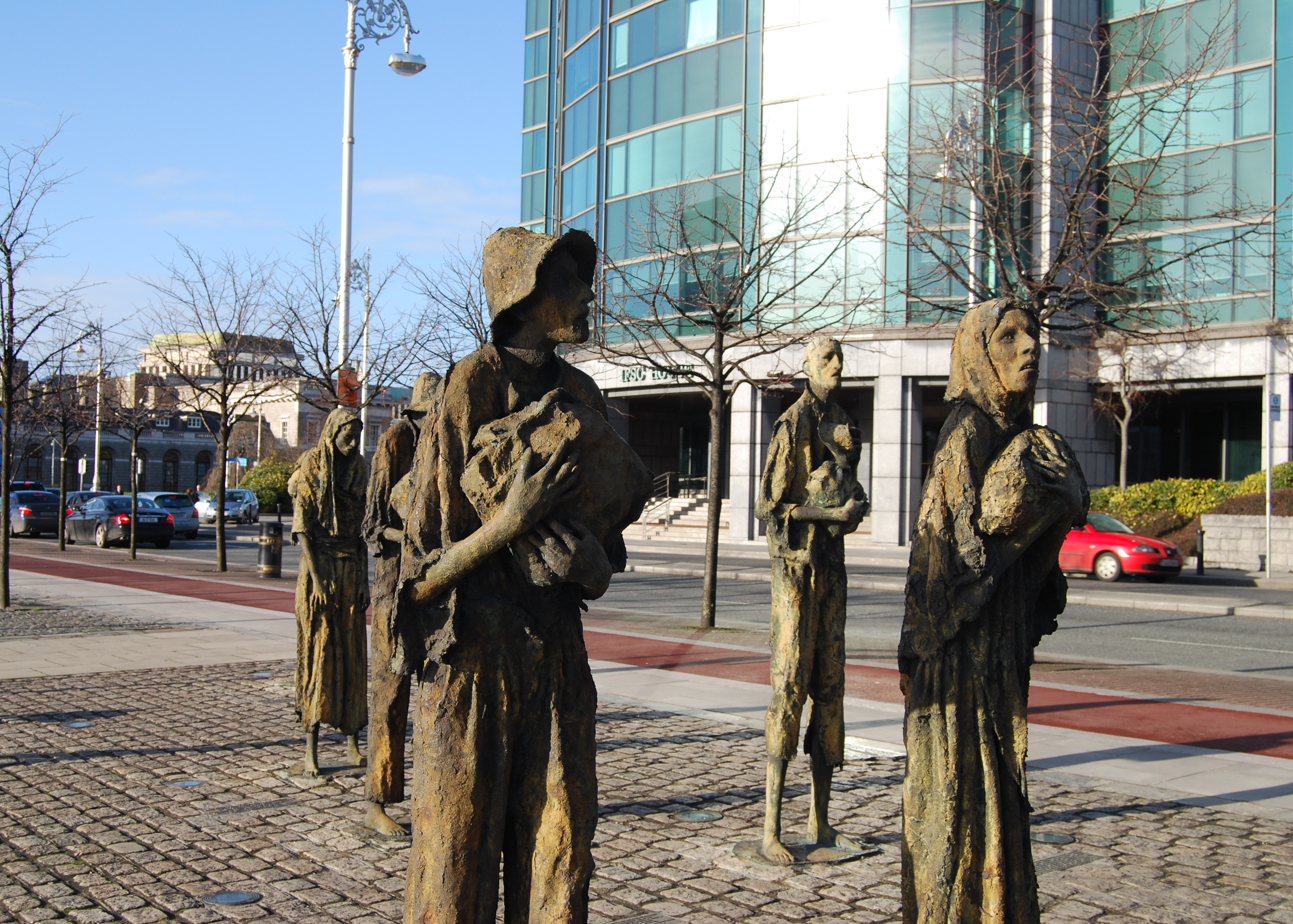
The Famine Memorial in Dublin, Republic of Ireland

Following the reformation of the Poor Laws in 1834, Ireland experienced a severe potato blight that lasted from 1845 to 1849 and killed an estimated 1.5 million people. The effects of the famine lasted until 1851. During this period the people of Ireland lost much land and many jobs, and appealed to the Westminster Parliament for aid. This aid generally came in the form of establishing more workhouses as indoor relief. Some people argue that as the United Kingdom of Great Britain and Ireland was in its prime as an empire, it could have given more aid in the form of money, food or rent subsidies.

In other parts of the United Kingdom, amendments to and adoptions of poor laws came in and around the same time. In Scotland, for example, the Poor Law (Scotland) Act 1845 revised the Poor Laws that were implemented under the 1601 Acts.

== See also ==
- Alms
- Debt relief
- Poverty in the United Kingdom
- History of poverty in the United Kingdom
- Poverty reduction
