= Civic Government (Scotland) Act 1982 =

Act of the Parliament of the United Kingdom

Civic Government (Scotland) Act 1982 (Note: Section 137(1).)
- Act of Parliament
- Parliament of the United Kingdom
- Long title: An Act to make provision as regards Scotland for the licensing and regulation of certain activities; for the preservation of public order and safety and the prevention crime; for prohibiting the taking of and dealing with indecent photographs of children; as to certain powers of constables and others; as to lost and abandoned property and property in the possession of persons taken into police custody; as to the rights and duties of the owners and users of certain land, buildings and other structures; as to the making by local authorities of byelaws; and to enable them to make management rules applying to land or premises under their control; as to certain other functions of local authorities and their officers; as to the time when the Burgh Police (Scotland) Acts 1892 to 1911 and certain local statutory provisions cease to have effect; and for connected purposes.
- Citation: 1982 c. 45
- Territorial extent: Scotland; England and Wales (section 16); (Note: Section 137(9).)

Dates
- Royal assent: 28 October 1982
- Commencement: 1 April 1983 (Note: The Civic Government (Scotland) Act 1982 (Commencement) Order 1983 (SI 1983/201), amended by the Civic Government (Scotland) Act 1982 (Commencement) Amendment Order 1984 (SI 1984/573) and Civic Government (Scotland) Act 1982 (Commencement) (Amendment No. 2) Order 1984 (SI 1984/774).); 1 July 1984; 1 January 1985 (Note: The Civic Government (Scotland) Act 1982 (Commencement) (Amendment No. 2) Order 1984 (SI 1984/774).); (Note: Section 137(2).)

Other legislation
- Amends: Children and Young Persons (Scotland) Act 1937; Public Passenger Vehicles Act 1981; Indecent Displays (Control) Act 1981
- Repeals/revokes: Vagrancy Act 1824; Licensing (Scotland) Act 1903
- Amended by: Public Order Act 1986; Coal Industry Act 1987; Housing (Scotland) Act 1987; Tribunals and Inquiries Act 1992; Statute Law (Repeals) Act 1993; Coal Industry Act 1994; Private Hire (London) Act 1998; Crime and Disorder Act 1998

Status: Amended

Text of statute as originally enacted

Revised text of statute as amended

Text of the Civic Government (Scotland) Act 1982 as in force today (including any amendments) within the United Kingdom, from legislation.gov.uk.

The Civic Government (Scotland) Act 1982 (c. 45) is an act of the Parliament of the United Kingdom which makes provision for a wide range of civic government matters.

== Provisions ==
Parts I and II of the act deal with licensing by local authorities of a range of activities including taxis and private hire cars, second-hand dealers, metal dealers, boat hire, street traders, market operators, public entertainment, indoor sports entertainment and window cleaners.

Part III deals with the control of sex shops.

Part IV sets out a range of public nuisance offences, including soliciting and importuning by prostitutes, urination or defecation in public places, dog fouling, dangerous animals, drunkenness, display, publication etc. of obscene material, obstruction by pedestrians, ticket touting, causing annoyance by playing of instruments, radios &c. Sections 52 and 52A create offences of possession, making and distribution etc. of indecent images of children.

Part V deals with public processions.

Part VI, VII and VIIA deal with lost or abandoned property, and the property of people taken into police custody.

Part VIII deals with local authorities' powers as regards buildings in need of maintenance and maintenance of common stairs.
