= Stass Paraskos obscenity trial =

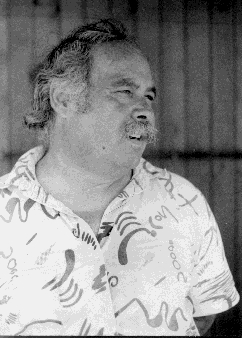
Stass Paraskos (family photograph)

Lovers and Romances by Stass Paraskos, 1966

The Stass Paraskos obscenity trial was a notorious court case held in the northern English city of Leeds in 1966 involving an exhibition of paintings by the Cyprus-born artist Stass Paraskos.

== Background ==
Stass Paraskos was born in Cyprus in 1933, but moved to England in 1953. Settling in the city of Leeds he enrolled for classes at Leeds College of Art and became a painter. In 1961 he began teaching at Leeds College of Art, and in 1966 an exhibition of his work, under the title Lovers and Romances, was organised for him by fellow artists and Leeds College of Art lecturers, Patrick Hughes and Robin Page, in the art college's gallery, known as the Leeds Institute Gallery.

== Obscenity trial ==
When the exhibition opened it was allegedly visited by local school group, but the teacher leading the group objected to the painting called Lovers and Romances and two colour sketches on the grounds that they showed a woman manually stimulating a man. The teacher reported the exhibition to the local police force and the exhibition was raided by the police and closed down. Although initially the Chief Constable of City of Leeds Police decided no action should be taken, during the Chief Constable's absence on vacation a decision was made to prosecute Paraskos after all. Consequently, Paraskos was charged under Section 4 of Vagrancy Act 1824 and Section 2 of the Vagrancy Act 1838, and under the Obscene Publications Act 1959.

Following this, Paraskos was summonsed to appear in court in Leeds on a charge of displaying paintings that were 'lewd and obscene', in contravention of the Vagrancy Acts and that the images were likely to ‘corrupt and deprave' anyone who saw them. This court case was one of a number of important legal challenges to the freedom of the arts in the 1960s and 70s, starting with the Lady Chatterley trial in 1960, and ending with the Oz magazine trial in 1971. However, 1966 appears to have been a key year in attempts by the British legal authorities to place restrictions on artistic freedom, with attempted and actual prosecutions that year of an exhibition at the Robert Fraser Gallery in London of paintings by Jim Dine, and a display of prints by the Victorian artist, Aubrey Beardsley, at the Victoria and Albert Museum, London, in addition to the Paraskos trial.

As with these other examples, the Paraskos trial became an international cause célèbre, with articles commenting on and protesting against the prosecution appearing in both the national British press, and internationally. It was also cited in the report of the Working Party convened, under the chairmanship of John Montgomerie, by the Arts Council of Great Britain in 1968, to review the obscenity laws in England and Wales.

Despite luminaries of the art world speaking in Paraskos's defence, including Herbert Read and Norbert Lynton, and messages of support from Britain's Home Secretary Roy Jenkins, Paraskos lost the trial and was fined twenty-five pounds making him the last artist to be successfully prosecuted in Britain for obscenity under Section 4 of the Vagrancy Act 1824 and Section 2 of the Vagrancy Act 1838.

== Aftermath ==
As a result of the trial, Paraskos was invited in 1967 to take part in a group exhibition, Fantasy and Figuration, alongside Pat Douthwaite, Herbert Kitchen and Ian Dury at the Institute of Contemporary Arts in London. Dury was later to become a close friend as they both began teaching at Canterbury College of Art in 1970.

In 2007 the Tate Gallery in London acquired two of the colour sketches that led to the prosecution, and these are now in the collection of the Tate Archive.

In 2016 the Tetley Arts Centre in Leeds staged a reconstruction of the raided exhibition, comprising several of the original paintings, along with archive material, from Britain's National Archives, relating to the trial.

In 2022 the trial featured in the BBC television documentary, Mary Beard's Forbidden Art, presented by Mary Beard.
