= Vagabonds Act 1549 =

Act of the Parliament of England

- Act of Parliament
- Parliament of England
- Long title: An Act touching the Punishment of Vagabonds, and other idle Persons.
- Citation: 3 & 4 Edw. 6. c. 16
- Territorial extent: England and Wales

Dates
- Royal assent: 1 February 1550
- Commencement: 4 November 1549 (Note: Start of session.)
- Repealed: 19 February 1624
Other legislation
Amends	Vagabonds Act 1530
Repeals/revokes	Vagabonds Act 1547
Amended by	Poor Act 1555; Poor Act 1562
Repealed by	Continuance, etc. of Laws Act 1623

Status: Repealed

Text of statute as originally enacted

The Vagabonds Act 1549 (3 & 4 Edw. 6. c. 16) was an act of the Parliament of England.

== Provisions ==
Section 1 of the act repealed the Vagabonds Act 1547 (1 Edw. 6. c. 3) and revived and made perpetual the Vagabonds Act 1530 (22 Hen. 8. c. 12).

== Subsequent developments ==
According to historian Mark Rathbone, "there is no evidence that the Act was enforced."

The act proved to be impractical to implement. The Tudor Vagabond Acts had an emphasis on punishments for the impotent poor. The English Poor Laws, that followed, built on the Tudor acts to provide a comprehensive system for poor relief, that was paid for by a system of compulsory taxation.

The whole act was repealed by section 11 of the Continuance, etc. of Laws Act 1623 (21 Jas. 1. c. 28).

== Bibliography ==
- Rathbone, Mark (2005). "Vagabond!". History Review. History Today: 8–13.
- Slack, Paul (1990). The English Poor Law 1531–1782. London: Mackmillan. ISBN 0-333-34869-9.

== See also ==
- Vagabonds Act
