= Vagabonds Act 1383 =

Act of Parliament of England

- Act of Parliament
- Parliament of England
- Long title: For Punishment of Vagabonds.
- Citation: 7 Ric. 2. c. 5
- Territorial extent: England and Wales; Ireland

Dates
- Royal assent: 1383
- Commencement: 26 October 1383 (Note: Start of session.)
- Repealed: England and Wales: 19 February 1624; Ireland: 10 August 1872

Other legislation
- Amended by: Vagabonds and Beggars Act 1495; Vagabonds Act 1597; Vagrancy (Ireland) Act 1847
- Repealed by: England and Wales: Continuance, etc. of Laws Act 1623; Ireland: Statute Law Revision (Ireland) Act 1872
- Relates to: Arrest, etc., of Night Walkers, etc. Act 1331

Status: Repealed

Text of statute as originally enacted

The Vagabonds Act 1383 (7 Ric. 2. c. 5), also known as the Beggars Act 1383, or the Vagrancy Act, was an act of the Parliament of England made at Westminster in 1383, after the Peasants' Revolt (1381).

The act empowered Justices of Assize, justices of the peace or county sheriffs to bind over vagabonds for good behaviour, or to commit them to the assizes if sureties could not be given.

The effect of this act was modified by a proclamation of 18 February 1493, which is included in the patent roll PR (C66/574/4d), and by the Vagabonds and Beggars Act 1495 (11 Hen. 7. c. 2)

Tomlins gives the title of this act as "For Punishment of Vagabonds". Ruffhead and Pickering give the title as "Justices, &c. shall examine Vagabonds, and bind them to their good abearing, or commit them to Prison", The Statute Law Revision (Ireland) Act 1872 describes this act as "Justices shall examine Vagabonds" and The Law Reports: Public General Statutes says this is the subject matter. The Chronological Table gives this act the title "Vagabonds".

The act includes references to faitors (feitors), drawlatches and roberdesmen.

== Subsequent developments ==
The act was extended to Ireland by Poynings' Law 1495 (10 Hen. 7. c. 22 (I)).

The act was repealed as to vagabonds by the Vagabonds Act 1597 (39 Eliz. 1. c. 4). The act was repealed for England and Wales by section 11 of the Continuance, etc. of Laws Act 1623 (21 Jas. 1. c. 28). The act was virtually repealed by the Vagrancy (Ireland) Act 1847 (10 & 11 Vict. c. 84).

The whole act was repealed for Ireland by section 1 of, and the schedule to, the Statute Law (Ireland) Revision Act 1872 (35 & 36 Vict. c. 98), which came into force on 10 August 1872.

== See also ==
- Nightwalker statute
- England in the Middle Ages
