= William Worsley (priest) =

Dean of St Paul's (Restitution) Act 1495
- Act of Parliament
- Parliament of England
- Long title: Pro Decano Sci Pauli.
- Citation: 11 Hen. 7. c. 52
- Territorial extent: England and Wales

Dates
- Royal assent: 22 December 1495
- Commencement: 14 October 1495 (Note: Start of session.)
- Repealed: 30 July 1949
Other legislation
Repealed by	Statute Law Revision Act 1948

Status: Repealed

Text of statute as originally enacted

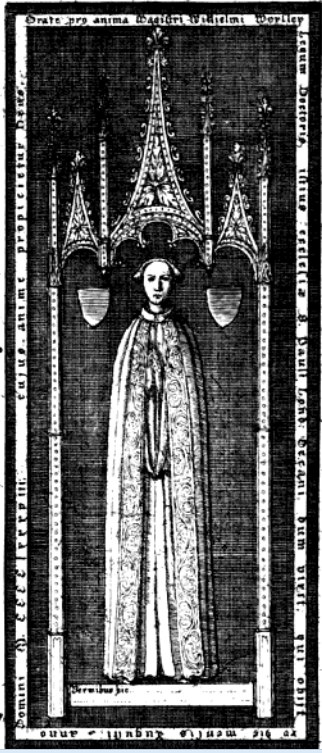
Dean William Worsley tomb slab at St Paul's Cathedral

William Worsley (1435?−1499), was a dean of St. Paul's cathedral.

He is assumed to have been educated at Cambridge, as he is not mentioned in Wood; he is described as ‘sanctæ theologiæ’ ‘professor,’ but in his epitaph states ‘doctor of laws.’ On 29 April 1449 he was advanced to the prebend of Tachbrook in Lichfield Cathedral, on 30 March 1453 to Norwell Overall in Southwell, and in 1457 to South Cave in York Cathedral. These preferments were apparently conferred on him during his minority by his uncles, for it was not till 20 Sept. 1460 that he was ordained priest. On 19 May 1467 he was moved to the rectory of Eakring, Nottinghamshire. On 28 Sept. 1476 he became archdeacon of Nottingham, and on 22 Jan. 1478−9 he was elected dean of St. Paul's in succession to Thomas Winterbourne; he retained with it the archdeaconry of Nottingham and the prebend of Willesden in St. Paul's, and from 1493 to 1496 was also archdeaconry of Taunton.

Worsley held the deanery throughout the reigns of Edward V and Richard III, but in 1494 he became involved with the revolutionary movement by Perkin Warbeck. He was arrested in November, confessed before a commission of Oyer and terminer, and was found guilty of high treason on the 14th (Rot. Parl. vi. 489b). The lay conspirators were put to death, but Worsley was saved by his order, and on 6 June 1495 he was pardoned (Gairdner, Letters and Papers, ii. 375). In the following October, the Parliament of England passed an act, the 'Dean of St Paul's (Restitution) Act 1495 (11 Hen. 7. c. 52) restoring him in blood (Statutes of the Realm, ii. 619). He had retained his ecclesiastical preferments, and died in possession of them on 14 August 1499, being buried in St. Paul's Cathedral; his epitaph and a very pessimistic copy of Latin verses are printed by Weever (Funerall Monuments, p. 368; Gough, Sepulchral Mon. ii. 337). Fabyan describes Worsley as ‘a famous doctour and precher’ (Chronicle, p. 685). His will, dated 12 Feb. 1498−9, was proved at Lambeth on 8 Nov. 1499, and at York on 27 March 1500, and is printed in ‘Testamenta Eboracensia,’ iv. 155−6; by it he left money for an obit in St. Paul's.

== Personal ==
Born probably about 1435, is believed to have been the son of Sir Robert Worsley of Booths in Eccles, Lancashire, and his wife Maude, daughter of Sir John Gerard of Bryn, Lancashire. His brother Robert married Margaret, niece of William Booth and Lawrence Booth, both of them Archbishops of York, to whose influence William owed most of his preferments.
