= Indecent Displays (Control) Act 1981 =

Act of the Parliament of the United Kingdom

Indecent Displays (Control) Act 1981 (Note: Section 9(1).)
- Act of Parliament
- Parliament of the United Kingdom
- Long title: An Act to make fresh provision with respect to the public display of indecent matter; and for purposes connected therewith.
- Citation: 1981 c. 42
- Territorial extent: England and Wales; Scotland; (Note: Section 9(4).)

Dates
- Royal assent: 27 July 1981
- Commencement: 27 October 1981 (Note: Section 9(5).)
Other legislation
Amends	Vagrancy Act 1824; Metropolitan Police Act 1839; Town Police Clauses Act 1847; Burgh Police (Scotland) Act 1892; Public Health Acts Amendment Act 1907; Criminal Justice Act 1967; Theatres Act 1968
Repeals/revokes	Vagrancy Act 1838; Indecent Advertisements Act 1889; Indecent Advertisements (Amendment) Act 1970
Amended by	Civic Government (Scotland) Act 1982; Police and Criminal Evidence Act 1984; Cinemas Act 1985; Broadcasting Act 1990; Statute Law (Repeals) Act 1993; Licensing Act 2003

Status: Amended

Text of statute as originally enacted

Revised text of statute as amended

Text of the Indecent Displays (Control) Act 1981 as in force today (including any amendments) within the United Kingdom, from legislation.gov.uk.

The Indecent Displays (Control) Act 1981 (c. 42) is an act of the Parliament of the United Kingdom covering Scotland, England and Wales but not Northern Ireland. It is concerned with preventing the display of "indecent" material to the unsuspecting public. As with the Protection of Children Act, the act does not define indecency, although it does give some directions as to how a display can be considered indecent. It establishes that "If any indecent matter is publicly displayed the person making the display and any person causing or permitting the display to be made shall be guilty of an offence", making exceptions for the following:

- material that is in a shop behind a warning notice (intended to protect sex shops for adults who wished to use them)
- anything for a paying adult audience only
- cinemas, theatres, and broadcasting, which are regulated separately
- displays by "the Crown or any local authority"
- museums and art galleries
- the actual human body, which is again subject to other controls

The maximum sentence under the act for making an indecent display is two years imprisonment. Various older pieces of legislation dealing with similar matters were repealed by the act, but it was directed that other legislation in Scotland was to remain in force alongside it, including provisions that later became part of the Civic Government (Scotland) Act 1982.

== Applicability ==
Prosecutions under the act are rare. In response to a parliamentary question in 2006, it was revealed that proceedings in England and Wales in the years 2002–2004 had run at three, six and two cases, with only three guilty verdicts, all in 2004.

The type of material covered by the definition "indecent" could be any material that does not meet a standard of decency in English or Scots law, a category considerably lower than that of "obscenity", which makes material illegal to sell, even in private. Under one of the act's predecessors, the album Never Mind the Bollocks, Here's the Sex Pistols was unsuccessfully prosecuted, and it has been displayed in shops ever since. In 2004, a nude sculpture was concealed from outside view after a warning about the act. In the case of advertisements, such as the fcuk campaign, the Advertising Standards Authority deals with complaints on a self-regulatory basis.
