= Vagrancy Act 1824 =

Act of the Parliament of the United Kingdom

Vagrancy Act 1824 (Note: The citation of this act by this short title was authorised by section 1 of, and the first schedule to, the Short Titles Act 1896. Due to the repeal of those provisions it is now authorised by section 19(2) of the Interpretation Act 1978.)
- Act of Parliament
- Parliament of the United Kingdom
- Long title: An Act for the Punishment of idle and disorderly Persons, and Rogues and Vagabonds, in that Part of Great Britain called England.
- Citation: 5 Geo. 4. c. 83
- Territorial extent: England and Wales (Note: Section 22.); Scotland (section 4); Ireland (section 4)

Dates
- Royal assent: 21 June 1824
- Commencement: 21 June 1824 (Note: The Acts of Parliament (Commencement) Act 1793.)
- Repealed: Scotland: 1 April 1983 (Note: The Civic Government (Scotland) Act 1982 (Commencement) Order 1983 (SI 1983/201).); England and Wales: 29 June 2026 (Note: The Police, Crime, Sentencing and Courts Act 2022 (Commencement No. 9) Regulations 2026 (SI 2026/690).)
Other legislation
Amended by	List: Universities Act 1825; Vagrancy Act 1838; Limitations of Actions and Costs Act 1842; Prevention of Crimes Act 1871; Statute Law Revision Act 1873; Summary Jurisdiction Act 1884; Statute Law Revision (No. 2) Act 1888; Statute Law Revision Act 1890; Penal Servitude Act 1891; Public Authorities Protection Act 1893; Vagrancy Act 1898; Costs in Criminal Cases Act 1908; Criminal Justice Act 1925; Poor Law Act 1927; Vagrancy Act 1935; Criminal Justice Act 1948; National Assistance Act 1948; Statute Law Revision Act 1950; Fraudulent Mediums Act 1951; Criminal Procedure (Attendance of Witnesses) Act 1965; Statute Law Revision Act 1966; Criminal Law Act 1967; Criminal Justice Act 1967; Theft Act 1968; Courts Act 1971; Criminal Procedure (Scotland) Act 1975; Criminal Attempts Act 1981; Indecent Displays (Control) Act 1981; Civic Government (Scotland) Act 1982; Criminal Justice Act 1982; Police and Criminal Evidence Act 1984; Public Order Act 1986; Statute Law (Repeals) Act 1989; Sexual Offences Act 2003; Serious Organised Crime and Police Act 2005; Justice Act (Northern Ireland) 2011
Repealed by	Scotland: Civic Government (Scotland) Act 1982; England and Wales: Police, Crime, Sentencing and Courts Act 2022

Status: Partially repealed

Text of statute as originally enacted

Revised text of statute as amended

Text of the Vagrancy Act 1824 as in force today (including any amendments) within the United Kingdom, from legislation.gov.uk.

The Vagrancy Act 1824 (5 Geo. 4. c. 83) is an act of the Parliament of the United Kingdom that makes it an offence to sleep rough or beg in England and Wales. The legislation was passed in Georgian England to combat the increasing number of people forced to live on the streets due to the conclusion of the Napoleonic Wars and the social effects of the Industrial Revolution. Critics of the law included politician and abolitionist, William Wilberforce, who condemned the act for making it a catch-all offence for vagrancy with no consideration of the circumstances as to why an individual might be homeless.

The act was formally repealed for England and Wales on 29 June 2026. Part of section 4 remains in force in Northern Ireland.

== Background ==
The act was enacted to deal with the increasing numbers of homeless and penniless urban poor in England and Wales. Following the conclusion of the Napoleonic Wars in 1815, the Industrial Revolution, implementation of the Corn Laws, and inclosure acts, thousands of people had been forced off the land. Destitute people gravitated to the expanding urban areas in the hope of finding employment.

Cities in England, especially London, Birmingham and Liverpool had become saturated with people living rough on the streets or in makeshift camps. The demographics of these groups included large numbers of soldiers and sailors who had been discharged following the Battle of Waterloo in 1815. Secretary at War, Viscount Palmerston had then ordered a massive reduction in size of the peacetime British Army and Royal Navy, resulting in thousands of ex-servicemen being left without occupation or accommodation. At the same time a massive influx of economic migrants from Ireland and Scotland arrived in England, especially into London, in search of work. Politicians in the unreformed House of Commons became concerned that parish constables were becoming ineffective in controlling these "vagrants". Furthermore the medieval pass laws which gave itinerant travelling people free movement through a given district were considered to be no longer effective.

The problem of vagrancy led to the creation of the Mendicity Society. Led by powerful members of the British establishment, it started a campaign to lobby Sir Robert Peel which successfully resulted in criminalising homelessness.

== Offences ==
First page of the text of the act

Punishment for the wide definition of vagrancy (including prostitution) was up to one month's hard labour.

== Subsequent developments ==
The act was amended several times, most notably by the Vagrancy Act 1838 (1 & 2 Vict. c. 38), which introduced a number of new public order offences covering acts that were deemed at the time to be likely to cause moral outrage. It contained a provision for the prosecution of "every Person wilfully exposing to view, in any Street ... or public Place, any obscene Print, Picture, or other indecent Exhibition".

Although the act originally applied only to England and Wales, section 4 of the act, which dealt mainly with vagrancy and begging, was extended to Scotland and Ireland by section 15 of the Prevention of Crimes Act 1871 (34 & 35 Vict. c. 112). Part of this section was repealed (in England and Wales only) by the Criminal Attempts Act 1981.

Section 19 of the act was repealed by section 2 of, and the schedule to, the Public Authorities Protection Act 1893 (56 & 57 Vict. c. 61), which came into force on 1 January 1894.

The Vagrancy Act 1898 (61 & 62 Vict. c. 39) prohibited soliciting or importuning for immoral purposes. Originally intended as a measure against prostitution, in practice the legislation was almost solely used to convict men for gay sex.

The Criminal Law Amendment Act 1912 (2 & 3 Geo. 5. c. 20), extended provisions of the Vagrancy Act 1824 to Scotland and Ireland, and suppressed brothels.

Section 15 of the act was repealed by section 1(1) of, and the first schedule to, the Statute Law Revision Act 1950 (14 Geo. 6. c. 6), which came into force on 23 May 1950.

The entire act was repealed in Scotland by section 137(8) of, and schedule 4 to, the Civic Government (Scotland) Act 1982, which came into force on 1 April 1983. An attempt was made in 1981 to repeal section 4 (and so, in effect, decriminalise begging and homelessness) in England and Wales, but the bill (the Vagrancy Offences (Repeal) Bill) did not progress beyond first reading.

In Ireland, section 18 of the Firearms and Offensive Weapons Act 1990 repealed section 4 of the 1824 act (begging and vagrancy).

Under the act, discharged military personnel were be granted exemption certificates allowing them to appeal for alms under certain circumstances.

In June 2025, the Secretary of State for Housing, Communities and Local Government, Angela Rayner, announced plans to repeal the 1824 act within one year. The government announced on 28 June 2026 that the Act would be repealed on 29 June.

The whole act was repealed for England and Wales by section 81(1) of the Police, Crime, Sentencing and Courts Act 2022, which came into force on 29 June 2026.

== Modern use ==
In 1988 some 573 people were prosecuted and convicted under the act in England and Wales, rising to 1,396 by 1989. In May 1990 the National Association of Probation Officers carried out a survey of prosecutions under the act. That survey revealed that 1,250 prosecutions had been dealt with in 14 magistrates courts in Central London in 1988, which represented an enormous leap in the number of prosecutions under the act, especially in London.

In 2014 three men were arrested and charged under section 4 of the Vagrancy Act 1824 for stealing food that had been put in skips and bins outside an Iceland supermarket in Kentish Town, North London. Three individuals were due to stand trial after allegedly taking cheese, tomatoes and cakes worth £33 from bins behind the shop. The Iceland chain denied any involvement in contacting the police, and in a public statement it questioned why the Crown Prosecution Service (CPS) felt that it was in the public interest to pursue a case against the three individuals. The three men, all of no fixed address, were due to attend a hearing at Highbury Magistrates' Court on 3 February 2014. However, before that date the CPS announced its decision to drop the case, stating that it felt it had not given due weight to the public interest factors tending against prosecution.

In 2020, 573 people were prosecuted under the act and calls for reform of the law in England increased, with pressure placed on Government by homelessness campaigners, members of parliament and other NGOs. This led to comments from some senior figures in the UK Government that the act should be repealed.

In April 2022, the Police, Crime, Sentencing and Courts Act 2022 was enacted and given royal assent. It contains a provision to repeal the Vagrancy Act 1824, but this provision was not brought into force by the Secretary of State until 2026. At the time, the government stated it did not intend to commence this repealing provision until appropriate replacement legislation had been passed.

In 2023, the number of prosecutions fell to 79. Following the 2024 General Election, the government stated that the Vagrancy Act 1824 will be repealed regardless of whether or not replacement legislation is passed.

== See also ==
- Criminalization of homelessness
- UK Vagrancy Acts
- Vagrancy
