= Poor Act 1562 =

Act of the Parliament of England

- Act of Parliament
- Parliament of England
- Long title: An Act for the relief of the poor.
- Citation: 5 Eliz. 1. c. 3
- Territorial extent: England and Wales

Dates
- Royal assent: 10 April 1563
- Commencement: 11 January 1563 (Note: Start of session.)
- Repealed: 24 August 1572
Other legislation
Amends	Vagabonds Act 1530; Vagabonds Act 1549; Poor Act 1555
Amended by	Continuance of Laws Act 1571
Repealed by	Vagabonds Act 1572

Status: Repealed

Text of statute as originally enacted

The Poor Act 1562 (5 Eliz. 1. c. 3) or Act for the Relief of the Poor was an act of the Parliament of England passed under Elizabeth I. It is a part of the Tudor Poor Laws.

The act extended the Poor Act 1555 (2 & 3 Ph. & M. c. 5). The act further provided that those who refused, after exhortation by the bishop, to contribute to poor relief could be bound over by a justice of the peace and assessed fines.

== Text of the act ==
A reviver of the statute of 22 H. 8. c. 12. and 3 & 4 Ed. 6. c. 16. touching relieving poor and impotent persons, and punishment of vagabonds. The poor and impotent persons of every parish shall be relieved of that which every person will of their charity give weekly; and the same relief shall be gathered in every parish by collectors assigned, and weekly distributed to the poor for none of them shall openly go or sit begging. And if any parishioner shall obstinately refuse to pay reasonably towards the relief of the said poor, or shall discourage others; then the justices of peace at the quarter-sessions may tax him to a reasonable weekly sum; which if he refuse, to pay they may commit him to prison. And if any parish have in it more impotent poor persons than they are able to relieve, then the justices of the peace of the county may licence so many of them as they shall think good, to beg in one or more hundreds of the same county. And if any poor beg in any other place than he is licensed, he shall be punished as a vagabond according to the stat of 22 H. 8. To endure to the end of the first session of the next parliament.

== Legacy ==
The act was continued until the end of the next session of parliament by the Continuance of Laws Act 1571 (13 Eliz. 1. c. 25).

The whole act was repealed by section 1 of the Vagabonds Act 1572 (14 Eliz. 1. c. 5).
