= Vagrancy Act 1838 =

Act of the Parliament of the United Kingdom

Vagrancy Act 1838 (Note: The citation of this act by this short title was authorised by section 1 of, and the first schedule to, the Short Titles Act 1896. Due to the repeal of those provisions it is now authorised by section 19(2) of the Interpretation Act 1978.)
- Act of Parliament
- Parliament of the United Kingdom
- Long title: An Act to amend an Act for punishing idle and disorderly Persons and Rogues and Vagabonds.
- Citation: 1 & 2 Vict. c. 38
- Territorial extent: United Kingdom

Dates
- Royal assent: 27 July 1838
- Commencement: 1 August 1838 (Note: Section 3.)
- Repealed: 27 October 1981
Other legislation
Amends	Vagrancy Act 1824
Amended by	Statute Law Revision Act 1874 (No. 2); Statute Law Revision (No. 2) Act 1890; Courts Act 1971; Indecent Displays (Control) Act 1981
Repealed by	Indecent Displays (Control) Act 1981

Status: Repealed

Text of statute as originally enacted

The Vagrancy Act 1838 (1 & 2 Vict. c. 38) was an act of the Parliament of the United Kingdom. It amended the Vagrancy Act 1824 (5 Geo. 4. c. 83) to provide that any person discharged from custody pending an appeal against a conviction under that act who did not then reappear to prosecute the appeal could be recommitted. It also provided that the penalty established by that Act for exposing indecent prints in a street or highway would extend to those who exposed the same material in any part of a shop or house.

This latter part of the act was to prove significant in a number of prosecutions of artists for allegedly exhibiting obscene works of art, even when those exhibitions took place in a private space such as an art gallery. One of the most notorious successful prosecutions of an artist under the act was in 1929, when thirteen paintings by D. H. Lawrence at the Warren Gallery, London, were seized by the police. A ban was placed on the paintings being shown in England, which is technically still in force, but they were shown again in London in December 2003.

The last artist to be successfully prosecuted under the 1838 act was Stass Paraskos in 1966, following a police raid on an exhibition of Paraskos's work at Leeds College of Art. Again a ban was placed on showing the offending paintings and drawings in England, which is also still legally valid. However one of the paintings was shown at Leeds City Art Gallery in 1993, and again at Scarborough Art Gallery in 2000, and several others are now owned by the Tate Gallery, London. In 1969 a total of 35 people were prosecuted under section 2 of the act and section 4 of the 1824 act for acts of public display of obscene images in shop windows and exhibitionism.

== Subsequent developments ==
Although aspects of the act had been repealed in a piecemeal fashion by subsequent legislation, the whole act was repealed by section 5(2) of, and the schedule to, the Indecent Displays (Control) Act 1981, which came into force on 27 October 1981. This was partly due to the lack of clarity in distinguishing between indecency and obscenity. For example the advertising of contraceptives was considered obscene from 1857, but fell under the ambit of the new act of 1981.

== Bibliography ==
- Alison, A. (1840). The Principles of Population Growth and Development. Vol. 2 vols. Edinburgh.
- Elliot, J. H. (1 September 1868). "The Increase of Material Prosperity and of Moral Agents Compared with the State of Crime and Pauperism'". Journal of the Statistical Society. xxxi: 209.
- Engels, Friedrich (1892). Conditions of the Working People in England in 1844. London.
- Stephen, J. F. (1883). History of the Criminal Law of England. Vol. 3 vols.
