= List of statutory instruments of the United Kingdom, 1984 =

This is an incomplete list of statutory instruments of the United Kingdom in 1984.

== Statutory instruments ==
=== 1-499 ===
==== 1–100 ====
- East Hertfordshire and Stevenage (Areas) Order 1984 (SI 1984/60)
- Bristol, Wansdyke and Woodspring (Areas) Order 1984 (SI 1984/66)
- Yeovil (Parishes) Order 1984 (SI 1984/67)
- Badenoch and Strathspey District (Electoral Arrangements) Amendment Order 1984 (SI 1984/68)
- Cumbernauld and Kilsyth District (Electoral Arrangements) Order 1983 (SI 1984/69)
- Basildon and Castle Point (Areas) Order 1984 (SI 1984/89)

== 101–200 ==
- Yorkshire Water Authority (Local Enactments) Order 1984 (SI 1984/108)
- Waverley (Parishes) Order 1984 (SI 1984/115)
- South Wight (Parishes) Order 1984 (SI 1984/116)
- Bassetlaw (Parishes) Order 1984 (SI 1984/117)
- Amber Valley (Parishes) Order 1984 (SI 1984/118)
- County of Leicestershire (Electoral Arrangements) Order 1984 (SI 1984/119)
- Royal County of Berkshire (Electoral Arrangements) Order 1984 (SI 1984/120)
- Rushcliffe (Parishes) Order 1984 (SI 1984/151)
- Newcastle-Under-Lyme (Parishes) Order 1984 (SI 1984/152)
- Kyle and Carrick District (Electoral Arrangements) Amendment Order 1984 (SI 1984/160)
- Gaming Act (Variation of Fees) Order 1984 (SI 1984/166)

== 201–300 ==
- Legal Advice and Assistance (Scotland) Amendment Regulations 1984 S.I. 1984/210
- Seeds (National Lists of Varieties) (Fees) (Amendment) Regulations 1984 S.I. 1984/243
- Gaming Act (Variation of Monetary Limits) Order 1984 S.I. 1984/247
- Gaming Clubs (Hours and Charges) Regulations 1984 S.I. 1984/248
- High Court of Justiciary Fees Order 1984 S.I. 1984/252
- Court of Session etc. Fees Order 1984 S.I. 1984/256
- The Peterborough (Parishes) Order 1984 S.I. 1984/258
- Supreme Court Funds (Amendment) Rules 1984 S.I. 1984/285
- National Health Service (Charges for Drugs and Appliances) Amendment Regulations 1984 S.I. 1984/298

== 301–400 ==
- Gaming Act (Variation of Fees) (Scotland) Order 1984 S.I. 1984/338
- The Test Valley (Parishes) Order 1984 S.I. 1984/348
- Occupational Pension Schemes (Contracting-out) Regulations 1984 S.I. 1984/380
- The Kirkcaldy District (Electoral Arrangements) Amendment Order 1984 S.I. 1984/382
- The North Wiltshire (Parishes) Order 1984 S.I. 1984/387

== 401–500 ==
- Merchant Shipping (Health and Safety: General Duties) Regulations 1984 S.I. 1984/408
- The Guildford (Parishes) Order 1984 S.I. 1984/411
- Seed Potatoes Regulations 1984 S.I. 1984/412
- Prevention of Terrorism (Supplemental Temporary Provisions) Order 1984 S.I. 1984/418
- Town and Country Planning (Control of Advertisements) Regulations 1984 S.I. 1984/421
- The Moray District (Electoral Arrangements) Amendment Order 1984 S.I. 1984/425
- Education (Grants for Further Training of Teachers) (Scotland) Regulations 1984 S.I. 1984/432
- The Dumfries and Galloway Region Nithsdale District (Electoral Arrangements) Amendment Order 1984 S.I. 1984/448
- The Strathclyde Region and Clydesdale District (Electoral Arrangements) Amendment Order 1984 S.I. 1984/449
- Social Security (Adjudication) Regulations 1984 S.I. 1984/451
- Social Security Adjudication (Consequential Amendments) Regulations 1984 S.I. 1984/458
- Aberdeen and District Milk Marketing Scheme 1984 S.I. 1984/464
- Gaming Act (Variation of Monetary Limits) (Scotland) Order 1984 S.I. 1984/468
- Gaming Clubs (Hours and Charges) (Scotland) Regulations 1984 S.I. 1984/470
- The Arfon (Communities) Order 1984 S.I. 1984/473

== 501–600 ==
- Third Country Fishing (Enforcement) Order 1984 (SI 1984/516)
- Legal Aid (Scotland) (Fees in Civil Proceedings) Regulations 1984 (SI 1984/519)
- Legal Aid (Scotland) (Fees in Criminal Proceedings) Regulations 1984 (SI 1984/520)
- County of Suffolk (Electoral Arrangements) Order 1984 (SI 1984/538)
- Llangollen and Corwen Light Railway Order 1984 (SI 1984/558)

== 601–700 ==
- Social Security (Adjudication) Amendment Regulations 1984 (SI 1984/613)
- Driving Licences (Exchangeable Licences) Order 1984 (SI 1984/672)

== 701–800 ==
- Agriculture (Miscellaneous Provisions) (Northern Ireland) Order 1984 S.I. 1984/702 (N.I. 2)
- Fines and Penalties (Northern Ireland) Order 1984 S.I. 1984/703 (N.I. 3)
- Stock Exchange (Listing) Regulations 1984 S.I. 1984/716
- The Glyndwr (Communities) Order 1984 S.I. 1984/739
- Local Government (Compensation for Redundancy and Premature Retirement) Regulations 1984 S.I. 1984/740
- Value Added Tax (Imported Goods) Relief Order 1984 S.I. 1984/746
- The Borough of Aberconwy (Electoral Arrangements) Order 1984 S.I. 1984/757
- The Borough of Rhondda (Electoral Arrangements) Order 1984 S.I. 1984/758
- The Meirionnydd (Communities) Order 1984 S.I. 1984/797

== 801–900 ==
- Merchant Shipping (Reception Facilities) Order 1984 (SI 1984/862)

== 901–1000 ==
- Supplementary Benefit (Miscellaneous Amendments) Regulations 1984 (SI 1984/938)
- Adoption Agencies (Scotland) Regulations 1984 (SI 1984/984)

== 1001–1100 ==
- Town and Country Planning (Crown Land Applications) Regulations 1984 (SI 1984/1015)
- Wireless Telegraphy (Broadcast Licence Charges and Exemption) Regulations 1984 (SI 1984/1053)
- Civil Courts (Amendment No. 2) Order 1984 (SI 1984/1075)

== 1101–1200 ==
- Poisonous Substances in Agriculture Regulations 1984 S.I. 1984/1114
- Fishing Vessels (Certification of Deck Officers and Engineer Officers) Regulations 1984 S.I. 1984/1115
- Financial Provisions (Northern Ireland) Order 1984 S.I. 1984/1157 (N.I. 7)
- Health and Social Security (Northern Ireland) Order 1984 S.I. 1984/1158 (N.I. 8)
- Industrial Training (Northern Ireland) Order 1984 S.I. 1984/1159 (N.I. 9)
- University of Ulster (Northern Ireland) Order 1984 S.I. 1984/1167 (N.I. 10)
- The Housing (Right to Buy) (Prescribed Persons) Order 1984 S.I. 1984/1173

== 1201–1300 ==
- Severn Valley Light Railway Order 1984 (SI 1984/1202)
- Merchant Shipping (Navigational Equipment) Regulations 1984 (SI 1984/1203)
- Merchant Shipping (Passenger Ship Construction and Survey) Regulations 1984 (SI 1984/1216)
- Merchant Shipping (Cargo Ship Construction and Survey) Regulations 1984 (SI 1984/1217)
- Merchant Shipping (Fire Protection) Regulations 1984 (SI 1984/1218)
- Secure Tenancies (Notices) (Amendment) Regulations 1984 (SI 1984/1224)
- Classification, Packaging and Labelling of Dangerous Substances Regulations 1984 (SI 1984/1244)
- Cosmetic Products (Safety) Regulations 1984 (SI 1984/1260)
- Agricultural Holdings (Arbitration on Notices) (Variation) Order 1984 (SI 1984/1300)

== 1301–1400 ==
- Pensions Increase (Review) Order 1984 (SI 1984/1307)
- Agricultural Holdings (Forms of Notice to Pay Rent or to Remedy) Regulations 1984 (SI 1984/1308)

== 1401–1500 ==
- Motor Vehicles (Type Approval and Approval Marks) (Fees) Regulations 1984 (SI 1984/1404)
- Taff-Ely (Communities) Order 1984 (SI 1984/1441)

== 1501–1600 ==
- Valuation Timetable (Scotland) Order 1984 (SI 1984/1504)
- Food Labelling (Scotland) Regulations 1984 (SI 1984/1519)
- The Tandridge (Parishes) Order 1984 (SI 1984/1560)
- The Ogwr (Communities) Order 1984 (SI 1984/1562)
- National Health Service Functions (Directions to Authorities and Administration Arrangements) Amendment Regulations 1984 (SI 1984/1577)
- Land Registration (District Registries) Order 1984 (SI 1984/1579)
- Construction (Metrication) Regulations 1984 (SI 1984/1593)

== 1601–1700 ==
- Remuneration of Teachers (Primary and Secondary Education) (Amendment) Order 1984 (SI 1984/1650)
- Chester-le-Street (Parishes) Order 1984 (SI 1984/1682)
- Statute Law Repeals (Isle of Man) Order 1984 (SI 1984/1692)

== 1701–1800 ==
- County of Norfolk (Electoral Arrangements) Order 1984 (SI 1984/1752)
- Alyn and Deeside (Communities) Order 1984 (SI 1984/1782)
- Sedgemoor and Taunton Deane (Areas) Order 1984 (SI 1984/1793)
- Borough of Arfon (Electoral Arrangements) Order 1984 (SI 1984/1799)

== 1801–1900 ==
- Transfer of Functions (Social Security Commissioners) Order 1984 (SI 1984/1818)
- Fire Services (Northern Ireland) Order 1984 (SI 1984/1821) (N.I. 11)
- General Consumer Council (Northern Ireland) Order 1984 (SI 1984/1822) (N.I. 12)
- The Lothian and Borders Regions and East Lothian and Berwickshire Districts (Monynut and Bothwell Valleys) Boundaries Amendment Order 1984 (SI 1984/1855) (S. 144)
- The Kyle and Carrick District and Cunninghame District (Drybridge and Barassie/Gailes Foreshore) Boundaries Amendment Order 1984 (SI 1984/1856) (S. 145)
- The Rhymney Valley (Communities) Order 1984 (SI 1984/1875)
- The South Cambridgeshire (Parishes) Order 1984 (SI 1984/1877)
- Fresh Meat Export (Hygiene and Inspection) (Scotland) Amendment Regulations 1984 (SI 1984/1885)
- Freight Containers (Safety Convention) Regulations 1984 (SI 1984/1890)

== 1901–2000 ==
- The Humberside and North Yorkshire (Areas) Order 1984 S.I. 1984/1906
- The Blaenau Gwent (Communities) Order 1984 S.I. 1984/1930
- The Central and Tayside Regions and Clackmannan District and Perth and Kinross District (Backhill, Glendevon) Boundaries Amendment Order 1984 S.I. 1984/1938 (S. 153)
- The Monklands and Strathkelvin Districts (Gartcosh Steel Works and Whitehill, Gartcosh) Boundaries Amendment Order 1984 S.I. 1984/1939 (S. 154)
- The East Kilbride and Hamilton Districts (Greenhall Estate, Blantyre and Torrance House, East Kilbride) Boundaries Amendment Order 1984 S.I. 1984/1940 (S. 155)
- The Inverclyde and Renfrew Districts (Heathmount, Kilmacolm and Knockmountain Farm) Boundaries Amendment Order 1984 S.I. 1984/1941 (S. 156)
- The County of Cambridgeshire (Electoral Arrangements) Order 1984 S.I. 1984/1944
- Child Benefit (Claims and Payments) Regulations 1984 S.I. 1984/1960
- Family Law (Miscellaneous Provisions) (Northern Ireland) Order 1984 S.I. 1984/1984 (N.I. 14)
- Road Traffic, Transport and Roads (Northern Ireland) Order 1984 S.I. 1984/1986 (N.I. 15)
- Social Security (Adjudication) Amendment (No. 2) Regulations 1984 S.I. 1984/1991

== 2001–2100 ==
- The Mid Bedfordshire (Parishes) Order 1984 S.I. 1984/2003
- Offshore Installations (Safety Zones) (No. 100) Order 1984 S.I. 1984/2011
- The Bedfordshire (Areas) Order 1984 S.I. 1984/2023
- The East Hampshire (Parishes) Order 1984 S.I. 1984/2025
- The Gravesham (Parishes) Order 1984 S.I. 1984/2026
- The Nairn and Inverness Districts (Croy) Boundaries Amendment Order 1984 S.I. 1984/2030 (S. 161)
- The Bolton (Parishes) Order 1984 S.I. 1984/2044
- The Scarborough (Parishes) Order 1984 S.I. 1984/2045
- The Suffolk Coastal District (Parishes) Order 1984 S.I. 1984/2046
- The Tunbridge Wells (Parishes) Order 1984 S.I. 1984/2047
- The Delyn (Communities) Order 1984 S.I. 1984/2049

== See also ==
- List of statutory instruments of the United Kingdom
