= Poor Act 1555 =

Act of the Parliament of England

- Act of Parliament
- Parliament of England
- Long title: An Act for the Relief of the Poor.
- Citation: 2 & 3 Ph. & M. c. 5
- Territorial extent: England and Wales

Dates
- Royal assent: 9 December 1555
- Commencement: 21 October 1555 (Note: Start of session)
- Repealed: 28 July 1863

Other legislation
- Amends: Vagabonds Act 1530; Vagabonds Act 1549; Poor Act 1551
- Amended by: Continuance of Laws Act 1558
- Repealed by: Statute Law Revision Act 1863

Status: Repealed

Text of statute as originally enacted

The Poor Act 1555 (2 & 3 Ph. & M. c. 5) was an act of the Parliament of England passed by Queen Mary I. It is a part of the Tudor Poor Laws.

The act extended the Poor Act 1551 (5 & 6 Edw. 6. c. 2) and added a provision that licensed beggars must wear badges. The provision requiring badges was added to shame local community members into donating more alms to their parish for poor relief.

== Provisions ==
Section 10 of the act provided that the act would remain in force until the end of the next parliament.

== Subsequent developments ==
The whole act was continued until the end of the next parliament by the Continuance of Laws Act 1558 (1 Eliz. 1. c. 18).

The whole act was repealed by section 1 of, and the schedule to, the Statute Law Revision Act 1863 (26 & 27 Vict. c. 125), which came into force on 28 July 1863.
