= Vagabonds Act 1536 =

Act of the Parliament of England

- Act of Parliament
- Parliament of England
- Long title: An Act for Punishment of sturdy Vagabonds and Beggars.
- Citation: 27 Hen. 8. c. 25
- Territorial extent: England and Wales

Dates
- Royal assent: 14 April 1536
- Commencement: 4 February 1536 (Note: Start of session.)
- Repealed: 28 July 1863

Other legislation
- Repealed by: Statute Law Revision Act 1863

Status: Repealed

Text of statute as originally enacted

The Act for Punishment of Sturdy Vagabonds and Beggars (27 Hen. 8. c. 25) was an act of the Parliament of England passed in Tudor England by Henry VIII. It is part of the Tudor Poor Laws. It was the earliest English Poor Law to provide for structured collections for the poor.

The act provided that “sturdy” vagabonds should be set to work after being punished. It also provided that local mayors, bailiffs, constables, and other officers were responsible for ensuring that the poor in their parish were cared for such that they need not beg. Although they could not use municipal funds nor levy a compulsory tax on the parish to raise this money, they organized collections in a common box. In addition, voluntary contributions to the poor other than through the common box were made illegal; the goal of this latter provision was to control discriminatory giving.

Although this act lapsed later in 1536, its designation of the parish as the administrator of charitable giving lasted into future poor law reforms.
