= List of acts of the Parliament of England from 1495 =

This is a list of acts of the Parliament of England for the year 1495.

For acts passed during the period 1707–1800, see the list of acts of the Parliament of Great Britain. See also the list of acts of the Parliament of Scotland, and the list of acts of the Parliament of Ireland.

For acts passed from 1801 onwards, see the list of acts of the Parliament of the United Kingdom. For acts of the devolved parliaments and assemblies in the United Kingdom, see the list of acts of the Scottish Parliament, the list of acts of the Northern Ireland Assembly, and the list of acts and measures of Senedd Cymru; see also the list of acts of the Parliament of Northern Ireland.

For medieval statutes, etc. that are not considered to be acts of Parliament, see the list of English statutes.

See also the List of ordinances and acts of the Parliament of England, 1642–1660 for ordinances and acts passed by the Long Parliament and other bodies without royal assent, and which were not considered to be valid legislation following the Restoration in 1660.

The number shown after each act's title is its chapter number. Acts are cited using this number, preceded by the years of the reign during which the relevant parliamentary session was held; thus the Union with Ireland Act 1800 is cited as "39 & 40 Geo. 3. c. 67", meaning the 67th act passed during the session that started in the 39th year of the reign of George III and which finished in the 40th year of that reign. The modern convention is to use Arabic numerals in citations (thus "41 Geo. 3" rather than "41 Geo. III"). Acts of the last session of the Parliament of Great Britain and the first session of the Parliament of the United Kingdom are both cited as "41 Geo. 3".

Acts passed by the Parliament of England did not have a short title; however, some of these acts have subsequently been given a short title by acts of the Parliament of the United Kingdom, such as the Short Titles Act 1896 (59 & 60 Vict. c. 14).

Acts passed by the Parliament of England were deemed to have come into effect on the first day of the session in which they were passed. Because of this, the years given in the list below may in fact be the year before a particular act was passed.

== 11 Hen. 7 ==
The 5th Parliament of King Henry VII, which met from 14 October 1495 until 22 December 1495.

This session was also traditionally cited as 11 H. 7.

Short title	Citation	Royal assent
Long title
Treason Act 1495	11 Hen. 7. c. 1	22 December 1495
An Acte that noe person going with the Kinge to the Warres shalbe attaynt of treason.
Vagabonds and Beggars Act 1495 or the Vagabond Act 1494 (repealed)	11 Hen. 7. c. 2	22 December 1495
An Acte agaynst vacabounds and beggers. (Repealed by Continuance, etc. of Laws Act 1623 (21 Jas. 1. c. 28))
Offences against Statutes Act 1495 (repealed)	11 Hen. 7. c. 3	22 December 1495
An Acte agaynst unlawfull Assemblyes and other offences contrary to former Statutes. (Repealed by Justices of the Peace Act 1509 (1 Hen. 8. c. 6))
Weights and Measures Act 1495 (repealed)	11 Hen. 7. c. 4	22 December 1495
An Acte for Wayghts and Measures. (Repealed for England and Wales by Statute Law Revision Act 1863 (26 & 27 Vict. c. 125) and for Ireland by Statute Law (Ireland) Revision Act 1872 (35 & 36 Vict. c. 98))
Weirs Act 1495 (repealed)	11 Hen. 7. c. 5	22 December 1495
An Acte for the pullinge downe of Weares and Engyns. (Repealed by Salmon Fishery Act 1861 (24 & 25 Vict. c. 109))
Customs Act 1495 (repealed)	11 Hen. 7. c. 6	22 December 1495
An Acte for the payment of Custumes for wollen Cloth transported. (Repealed for England and Wales by Statute Law Revision Act 1863 (26 & 27 Vict. c. 125) and for Ireland by Statute Law (Ireland) Revision Act 1872 (35 & 36 Vict. c. 98))
Riot Act 1495 (repealed)	11 Hen. 7. c. 7	22 December 1495
An Acte agaynst ryotts and unlawfull assemblyes. (Repealed for England and Wales by Statute Law Revision Act 1863 (26 & 27 Vict. c. 125) and for Ireland by Statute Law (Ireland) Revision Act 1872 (35 & 36 Vict. c. 98))
Usury Act 1495 (repealed)	11 Hen. 7. c. 8	22 December 1495
An Acte agaynst Usurye. (Repealed for England and Wales by Statute Law Revision Act 1863 (26 & 27 Vict. c. 125) and for Ireland by Statute Law (Ireland) Revision Act 1872 (35 & 36 Vict. c. 98))
Lordship of Tyndal Act 1495 (repealed)	11 Hen. 7. c. 9	22 December 1495
An Acte to make the Lordshipp of North Tyndall & South Tyndall to be within the County of Northumbland. (Repealed by Statute Law (Repeals) Act 1975 (c. 10))
Taxation Act 1495 (repealed)	11 Hen. 7. c. 10	22 December 1495
Per Benevolencia. (Repealed for England and Wales by Statute Law Revision Act 1863 (26 & 27 Vict. c. 125) and for Ireland by Statute Law (Ireland) Revision Act 1872 (35 & 36 Vict. c. 98))
Worsted Act 1495 (repealed)	11 Hen. 7. c. 11	22 December 1495
An Acte agaynst such Sherers of Worstede as have not byn apprentises to that Trade. (Repealed for England and Wales by Statute Law Revision Act 1863 (26 & 27 Vict. c. 125) and for Ireland by Statute Law (Ireland) Revision Act 1872 (35 & 36 Vict. c. 98))
Suing in Forma Pauperis Act 1495 (repealed)	11 Hen. 7. c. 12	22 December 1495
An Acte to admytt such persons as are poore to sue in formâ pauperis. (Repealed by Statute Law (Repeals) Act 1973 (c. 39))
Exportation Act 1495 (repealed)	11 Hen. 7. c. 13	22 December 1495
An Acte agaynst transportinge of Horses and Mares beyounde the Seas. (Repealed by Repeal of Acts Concerning Importation Act 1822 (3 Geo. 4. c. 41))
Customs (No. 2) Act 1495 (repealed)	11 Hen. 7. c. 14	22 December 1495
An Acte that all Straungers and Denysons shall paye Custome. (Repealed by Repeal of Acts Concerning Importation Act 1822 (3 Geo. 4. c. 41))
Sheriff's County Court Act 1495 (repealed)	11 Hen. 7. c. 15	22 December 1495
An Acte agaynst Shreiffs and Undershriefs. (Repealed by Sheriffs Act 1887 (50 & 51 Vict. c. 55))
Calais Act 1495 (repealed)	11 Hen. 7. c. 16	22 December 1495
Villa Cales. (Repealed for England and Wales by Statute Law Revision Act 1863 (26 & 27 Vict. c. 125) and for Ireland by Statute Law (Ireland) Revision Act 1872 (35 & 36 Vict. c. 98))
Game, etc. Act 1495 (repealed)	11 Hen. 7. c. 17	22 December 1495
An Act agaynst taking of Feasaunts & Partridgs. (Repealed by Game Act 1831 (1 & 2 Will. 4. c. 32))
Attendance in War Act 1495 (repealed)	11 Hen. 7. c. 18	22 December 1495
An Acte that the Master of the Rolls and other Offycers of the Chauncery shall not goe to the Warr. (Repealed for England and Wales by Statute Law Revision Act 1863 (26 & 27 Vict. c. 125) and for Ireland by Statute Law (Ireland) Revision Act 1872 (35 & 36 Vict. c. 98))
Upholsterers Act 1495 (repealed)	11 Hen. 7. c. 19	22 December 1495
An Acte agaynst Upholsters. (Repealed by Repeal of Obsolete Statutes Act 1856 (19 & 20 Vict. c. 64))
Dowress, etc. Act 1495 (repealed)	11 Hen. 7. c. 20	22 December 1495
An Acte agaynst Recoveryes and Discontinuances made by Tenants in Dower. (Repealed by Fines and Recoveries Act 1833 (3 & 4 Will. 4. c. 74))
Perjury Act 1495 (repealed)	11 Hen. 7. c. 21	22 December 1495
An Act agaynst Perjurye. (Repealed by Repeal of Obsolete Statutes Act 1856 (19 & 20 Vict. c. 64))
Wages of Labourers, etc. Act 1495 (repealed)	11 Hen. 7. c. 22	22 December 1495
An Act for Servants Wages. (Repealed for England and Wales by Statute Law Revision Act 1863 (26 & 27 Vict. c. 125) and for Ireland by Statute Law (Ireland) Revision Act 1872 (35 & 36 Vict. c. 98))
Fish Act 1495 (repealed)	11 Hen. 7. c. 23	22 December 1495
An Acte agaynsty Marchaunt Straungers for sellyng of Samon and other fyshe. (Repealed for England and Wales by Statute Law Revision Act 1863 (26 & 27 Vict. c. 125) and for Ireland by Statute Law (Ireland) Revision Act 1872 (35 & 36 Vict. c. 98))
Attaints Act 1495 (repealed)	11 Hen. 7. c. 24	22 December 1495
An Acte for Writts of Attaynt to be brought agaynst Jurors for untrue Verdicts. (Repealed for England and Wales by Statute Law Revision Act 1863 (26 & 27 Vict. c. 125) and for Ireland by Statute Law (Ireland) Revision Act 1872 (35 & 36 Vict. c. 98))
Perjury (No. 2) Act 1495 (repealed)	11 Hen. 7. c. 25	22 December 1495
An Acte agaynst Perjury unlawfull mayntenaunce and corrupcion in officers. (Repealed by Statute Law Revision Act 1863 (26 & 27 Vict. c. 125))
Jurors Act 1495 (repealed)	11 Hen. 7. c. 26	22 December 1495
An Act that Shreifs shall retorne sufficient Jurors. (Repealed by Statute Law Revision Act 1863 (26 & 27 Vict. c. 125))
Fustians Act 1495 (repealed)	11 Hen. 7. c. 27	22 December 1495
An Act agaynst unlawfull & deceyptfull makinge of Fustyans. (Repealed by Repeal of Obsolete Statutes Act 1856 (19 & 20 Vict. c. 64))
Lands of Richard III assured by the King Act 1495 (repealed)	11 Hen. 7. c. 28	22 December 1495
Pro Rege. (Repealed by Statute Law Revision Act 1948 (11 & 12 Geo. 6. c. 62))
Resumption of Crown Lands Act 1495 (repealed)	11 Hen. 7. c. 29	22 December 1495
Pro Rege: An Acte of Resumpcion. (Repealed by Statute Law Revision Act 1948 (11 & 12 Geo. 6. c. 62))
Gervys Home (Remittal of Attainder) Act 1495 (repealed)	11 Hen. 7. c. 30	22 December 1495
Pro Rege: Horne. (Repealed by Statute Law Revision Act 1948 (11 & 12 Geo. 6. c. 62))
Woodstock Manor Grants Void Act 1495 (repealed)	11 Hen. 7. c. 31	22 December 1495
Pro Rege. An Acte that all graunts made of the Manno of Woodstock be voide. (Repealed by Statute Law Revision Act 1948 (11 & 12 Geo. 6. c. 62))
Queen's Jointure Act 1495 (repealed)	11 Hen. 7. c. 32	22 December 1495
Pro Regina: An Acte for the Quenes Joynture. (Repealed by Statute Law Revision Act 1948 (11 & 12 Geo. 6. c. 62))
Leases in Wales, Cornwall, and Chester Void Act 1495 (repealed)	11 Hen. 7. c. 33	22 December 1495
Pro Principe Wales: An Acte for the making voide of dyvers leases & offices within the Principality of Wales, &c. (Repealed by Statute Law Revision Act 1948 (11 & 12 Geo. 6. c. 62))
Lands Assured to Prince of Wales Act 1495 (repealed)	11 Hen. 7. c. 34	22 December 1495
Pro eodem. An Acte for the assuering of certayne lands to the Prynce of Wales. (Repealed by Statute Law (Repeals) Act 1978 (c. 45))
Lands Assured to Duke of York Act 1495 (repealed)	11 Hen. 7. c. 35	22 December 1495
Pro Duce Ebor. (Repealed by Statute Law (Repeals) Act 1978 (c. 45))
Estates of Duchess of Bedford Act 1495 (repealed)	11 Hen. 7. c. 36	22 December 1495
Pro Ducissa Bed. (Repealed by Statute Law (Repeals) Act 1978 (c. 45))
Estates of Marquis of Dorset and Wife Act 1495 (repealed)	11 Hen. 7. c. 37	22 December 1495
D feoffamento fco p Marchionem Dors. (Repealed by Statute Law (Repeals) Act 1978 (c. 45))
Countess of Oxford Act 1495 (repealed)	11 Hen. 7. c. 38	22 December 1495
Pro Comite Oxon. (Repealed by Statute Law Revision Act 1948 (11 & 12 Geo. 6. c. 62))
Estates of Earl of Suffolk Act 1495 (repealed)	11 Hen. 7. c. 39	22 December 1495
Pro Comite Suff. (Repealed by Statute Law (Repeals) Act 1978 (c. 45))
Estates of Earl of Surrey Act 1495 (repealed)	11 Hen. 7. c. 40	22 December 1495
Pro Comite Surr. (Repealed by Statute Law (Repeals) Act 1978 (c. 45))
Annuity to Earl of Surrey Act 1495 (repealed)	11 Hen. 7. c. 41	22 December 1495
Pro Comite Surr. (Repealed by Statute Law Revision Act 1948 (11 & 12 Geo. 6. c. 62))
Feoffment by Earl of Surrey Act 1495 (repealed)	11 Hen. 7. c. 42	22 December 1495
De feoffamento fco pro Comitem Surr. (Repealed by Statute Law Revision Act 1948 (11 & 12 Geo. 6. c. 62))
Earl of Devon Act 1495 (repealed)	11 Hen. 7. c. 43	22 December 1495
De feoffamento fco pro Comitem Devon. (Repealed by Statute Law Revision Act 1948 (11 & 12 Geo. 6. c. 62))
Restitution of Earl of Kildare Act 1495 (repealed)	11 Hen. 7. c. 44	22 December 1495
Pro Comite Kyldare. (Repealed by Statute Law (Repeals) Act 1977 (c. 18))
Prior of Kilmaynan, Ireland Act 1495	11 Hen. 7. c. 45	22 December 1495
Pro Prioratu de Kilmaynan.
Custody of Viscount Beaumont and His Estates Act 1495 (repealed)	11 Hen. 7. c. 46	22 December 1495
De Custodia Vic Beaumont. (Repealed by Statute Law Revision Act 1948 (11 & 12 Geo. 6. c. 62))
Edward, Lord Dudley Act 1495 (repealed)	11 Hen. 7. c. 47	22 December 1495
Pro Domino Dudley. (Repealed by Statute Law Revision Act 1948 (11 & 12 Geo. 6. c. 62))
John, Lord Zouche and Seymour Act 1495 (repealed)	11 Hen. 7. c. 48	22 December 1495
Pro Domino Souche & Seymour. (Repealed by Statute Law Revision Act 1948 (11 & 12 Geo. 6. c. 62))
Sir R. Guldeford's Lands in Kent Disgavelled Act 1495 (repealed)	11 Hen. 7. c. 49	22 December 1495
Pro Rico Guldeford Milite. (Repealed by Statute Law Revision Act 1948 (11 & 12 Geo. 6. c. 62))
Sir Wm. Berkly (Restitution) Act 1495 (repealed)	11 Hen. 7. c. 50	22 December 1495
Pro Willo Berkley Mit. (Repealed by Statute Law Revision Act 1948 (11 & 12 Geo. 6. c. 62))
John Shaa (Lost Deeds) Act 1495 (repealed)	11 Hen. 7. c. 51	22 December 1495
Pro Johe Shaa. (Repealed by Statute Law Revision Act 1948 (11 & 12 Geo. 6. c. 62))
Dean of St Paul's (Restitution) Act 1495 (repealed)	11 Hen. 7. c. 52	22 December 1495
Pro Decano Sci Pauli. (Repealed by Statute Law Revision Act 1948 (11 & 12 Geo. 6. c. 62))
Thos. Middleton (Restitution) Act 1495 (repealed)	11 Hen. 7. c. 53	22 December 1495
Pro Th Middelton. (Repealed by Statute Law Revision Act 1948 (11 & 12 Geo. 6. c. 62))
Geo. Catesby (Restitution) Act 1495 (repealed)	11 Hen. 7. c. 54	22 December 1495
Pro Georgio Catysby. (Repealed by Statute Law Revision Act 1948 (11 & 12 Geo. 6. c. 62))
Simon Digby (Grants Confirmed) Act 1495 (repealed)	11 Hen. 7. c. 55	22 December 1495
Pro Simone Dygby Armigo. (Repealed by Statute Law Revision Act 1948 (11 & 12 Geo. 6. c. 62))
Sir Ric. Ratcliff (Attainder Annulled) Act 1495 (repealed)	11 Hen. 7. c. 56	22 December 1495
Pro Rico Ratclyff. (Repealed by Statute Law Revision Act 1948 (11 & 12 Geo. 6. c. 62))
Restitution of Clement Skelton Act 1495 (repealed)	11 Hen. 7. c. 57	22 December 1495
Pro Clemente Skelton. (Repealed by Statute Law Revision Act 1948 (11 & 12 Geo. 6. c. 62))
Heirs of Wm. Waynsford (Attainder Annulled) Act 1495 (repealed)	11 Hen. 7. c. 58	22 December 1495
Pro Hered Willi Waynsforde. (Repealed by Statute Law Revision Act 1948 (11 & 12 Geo. 6. c. 62))
Pardon of John Slingesby the Elder Act 1495 (repealed)	11 Hen. 7. c. 59	22 December 1495
Pro Johe Slyngesby. (Repealed by Statute Law Revision Act 1948 (11 & 12 Geo. 6. c. 62))
Inheritance of Hugh Mayne Act 1495 (repealed)	11 Hen. 7. c. 60	22 December 1495
Pro Hugone Mayne. (Repealed by Statute Law Revision Act 1948 (11 & 12 Geo. 6. c. 62))
Safety of Berwick and Carlisle Act 1495	11 Hen. 7. c. 61	22 December 1495
Pro Berwik & Carliol.
Expenses of King's Household Act 1495 (repealed)	11 Hen. 7. c. 62	22 December 1495
Assignacio expens Hospicii Regis. (Repealed by Statute Law Revision Act 1948 (11 & 12 Geo. 6. c. 62))
Attainder of Viscount Lovel Act 1495 (repealed)	11 Hen. 7. c. 63	22 December 1495
Actus conviccionis Francisci nupro Vic Lovell. (Repealed by Statute Law Revision Act 1948 (11 & 12 Geo. 6. c. 62))
Attainder of Sir William Stanley, etc. Act 1495 (repealed)	11 Hen. 7. c. 64	22 December 1495
Actus conviccionis certarum personarum. (Repealed by Statute Law Revision Act 1948 (11 & 12 Geo. 6. c. 62))
Peace of Étaples Act 1495 (repealed)	11 Hen. 7. c. 65	22 December 1495
An Acte concerninge the Peace betwene the Kinge of England & Kinge of Fraunce. (Repealed by Statute Law Revision Act 1948 (11 & 12 Geo. 6. c. 62))

=== Sources ===
- "11° Hen. VII.". The Statutes of the Realm. Vol. 2: 1377 to 1509. pp. 568–635 – via HathiTrust.
- "Anno undecimo Henrici VII". The Statutes at Large. Vol. 4 - 1 Richard III to 31 Henry VIII - 1483-4 to 1539. pp. 54–76 – via Internet Archive.
- "Anno undecimo Henrici VII". The Statutes at Large. Vol. 4 - 1 Richard III to 31 Henry VIII - 1483-4 to 1539. pp. 54–76 – via Internet Archive.
- "Anno undecimo Henrici VII". The Statutes at Large. Vol. 4 - 1 Richard III to 31 Henry VIII - 1483-4 to 1539. pp. 54–76 – via Internet Archive.
- Chronological Table of and Index to the Statutes. Vol. 1: To the End of the Session 59 Vict. Sess. 2 (1895) (13th ed.). London: Her Majesty's Stationery Office. 1896. p. 42 – via Google Books.
- Chronological Table of the Statutes: Covering the Period from 1235 to the End of 1971. London: Her Majesty's Stationery Office. 1972. pp. 36–37. ISBN 978-0-11-840096-1 – via Google Books.
- "Acts of the English Parliament from 1495". legislation.gov.uk. The National Archives.

== See also ==
- List of acts of the Parliament of England
