= Vagabonds Act 1547 =

Act of the Parliament of England

- Act of Parliament
- Parliament of England
- Long title: An Act for the punishment of Vagabonds, and for the Relief of the poor and impotent Persons.
- Citation: 1 Edw. 6. c. 3
- Territorial extent: England and Wales

Dates
- Royal assent: 24 December 1547
- Commencement: 4 November 1547 (Note: Start of session.)
- Repealed: 28 July 1863

Other legislation
- Amended by: Vagabonds Act 1549
- Repealed by: Statute Law Revision Act 1863

Status: Repealed

Text of statute as originally enacted

The Vagabonds Act 1547 (1 Edw. 6. c. 3), also known as the Vagrancy Act 1547, was an act of the Parliament of England, passed by King Edward VI and his Lord Protector, Edward Seymour.

== Description ==
It provided that vagabonds could be enslaved for two years and continued weekly parish collections for the poor. The enslaved vagabonds were to be fed bread and water or small drink and were allowed to be worked by beating, chaining, or other methods the master may choose. Vagabond slaves were allowed to be bought and sold just as other slaves. Also, should no private man want the vagabond slave, the slave was to be sent to their town of birth and be forced to work as a slave for that community. Vagabond children could be claimed as "apprentices" and be held as such until the age of 24 if a boy, or the age of 20 if a girl. Should they attempt to escape this apprenticeship, they were subject to enslavement for the remainder of the apprenticeship.

According to historian Mark Rathbone, "there is no evidence that the Act was enforced." The Vagabonds Act 1549 (3 & 4 Edw. 6. c. 16) makes a reference to the limited enforcement of the punishments established by the act by stating "the extremity of some [of the laws] have been occasion that they have not been put into use."

The act proved to be impractical to implement. The Tudor Vagabond Acts had an emphasis on punishments for the impotent poor. The English Poor Laws, that followed, built on the Tudor acts to provide a comprehensive system for poor relief, that was paid for by a system of compulsory taxation.

"Context and legacy" Scholars generally link the statute to Protector Somerset’s early social policy amid enclosure pressures and post-1549 unrest, but also note that magistrates were reluctant to use the Act’s enslavement clauses and Parliament quickly reversed course in 1549. In practice the measure proved largely a dead letter, yet it sharpened contemporary debates over “idleness” and helped push policy from punitive controls toward parish-based relief that culminated in the Elizabethan Poor Laws. Later commentators have repeatedly emphasized the lack of evidence for systematic enforcement while stressing the Act’s rhetorical afterlife in Tudor poverty discourse.

== Subsequent developments ==
The whole act was repealed by section 1 of the Vagabonds Act 1549 (3 & 4 Edw. 6. c. 16). However, that act was repealed without a saving by section 11 of the Continuance, etc. of Laws Act 1623 (21 Jas. 1. c. 28). For the avoidance of doubt, the whole act was repealed by section 1 of, and the schedule to, the Statute Law Revision Act 1863 (26 & 27 Vict. c. 125), which came into force on 28 July 1863.

== See also ==
- Vagabonds Act

== Bibliography ==
- Davies, C.S.L. (1966). "Slavery and Protector Somerset: The Vagrancy Act of 1547". The Economic History Review. 19 (3): 533–549. doi:10.2307/2593162. JSTOR 2593162.
- Rathbone, Mark (2005). "Vagabond!". History Review. History Today: 8–13.
- Slack, Paul (1990). The English Poor Law 1531–1782. London: Mackmillan. ISBN 0-333-34869-9.
- Trueman, C.N. (2015). "Edward Seymour And Government". The History Learning Site.
