= Vagabonds and Beggars Act 1494 =

Act of the Parliament of England

- Act of Parliament
- Parliament of England
- Long title: An Act against Vagabonds and Beggars.
- Citation: 11 Hen. 7. c. 2
- Introduced by: Laurence
- Territorial extent: England and Wales

Dates
- Royal assent: 22 December 1495
- Commencement: 14 October 1495 (Note: Start of session.)
- Repealed: 19 February 1624
Other legislation
Amended by	Vagabonds Act 1383
Repealed by	Continuance, etc. of Laws Act 1623
Relates to	Unlawful Games Act 1541

Status: Repealed

Text of statute as originally enacted

The Vagabonds and Beggars Act 1494 or the Vagabond Act 1494 (11 Hen. 7. c. 2) was an act of the Parliament of England passed during the reign of Henry VII. The act stated that "vagabonds, idle and suspected persons shall be set in the stocks for three days and three nights and have none other sustenance but bread and water and then shall be put out of Town. Every beggar suitable to work shall resort to the Hundred where he last dwelled, is best known, or was born and there remain upon the pain aforesaid."

== Social context ==
Local government during the early modern period in England (1400s – 1700s) was very different from modern government in that it relied on the community to enforce law and order. No police force existed and local government positions were often filled on a voluntary basis. These positions were held by neighbours, friends, employers, and churchwardens; local government was based around the idea of community and working together to establish societal order.

The early modern period challenged these social establishments as England experienced a time of inflation and extreme population growth and incurred a widening gap between the wealthy and the poor. These social pressures and changes caused a disruption in the natural order of society: the idea that every man, woman, and child knew his or her place in English society. This population growth and social change put stress on the established governmental order, changing how the government chose to maintain order throughout the country. Often, the poor became the targets of these newer laws set on re-establishing societal order. Labelled as beggars and vagabonds, laws like the Vagabonds and Beggars Act 1494 aimed to punish the poor of England for simply being poor.

Early modern England stressed the idea of societal order and that each individual should know his or her correct place within that structure. The poor challenged the existing structure because they did not necessarily fit into a specific place. The Poor Law and settlement laws and Tudor proclamations that followed reinforced the Vagabonds and Beggars Act 1494, keeping people in their correct societal place.

== Rise of crime ==
London, with its large population and frequent visitors, made staying anonymous an easy task for criminals. A criminal underworld soon formed and developed a security and intelligence system that protected professional criminals from the minimal policing force. Those who made their living through crime formed their own neighbourhood that centred its activity around one of the busiest areas of London, St. Paul's Cathedral. The dangers of London prompted the creation of informational material that warned prospective visitors of the typical scams that criminals used; such as Gilbert Walker's Manifest Detection of Dice Play (1552) and Robert Greene's A Notable Discovery of Cozenage (1592).

Criminal activity broke gender boundaries and both men and women became professionals. Some women chose to act and dress like men. One of the most successful of these was Mary Frith (Moll Cutpurse) who also helped organise and instruct the criminal underworld.

== Subsequent developments ==
The whole act was repealed by section 11 of the Continuance, etc. of Laws Act 1623 (21 Jas. 1. c. 28), which came into force on 9 February 1624.
